= Grantham =

Market town in Lincolnshire, England

- Town
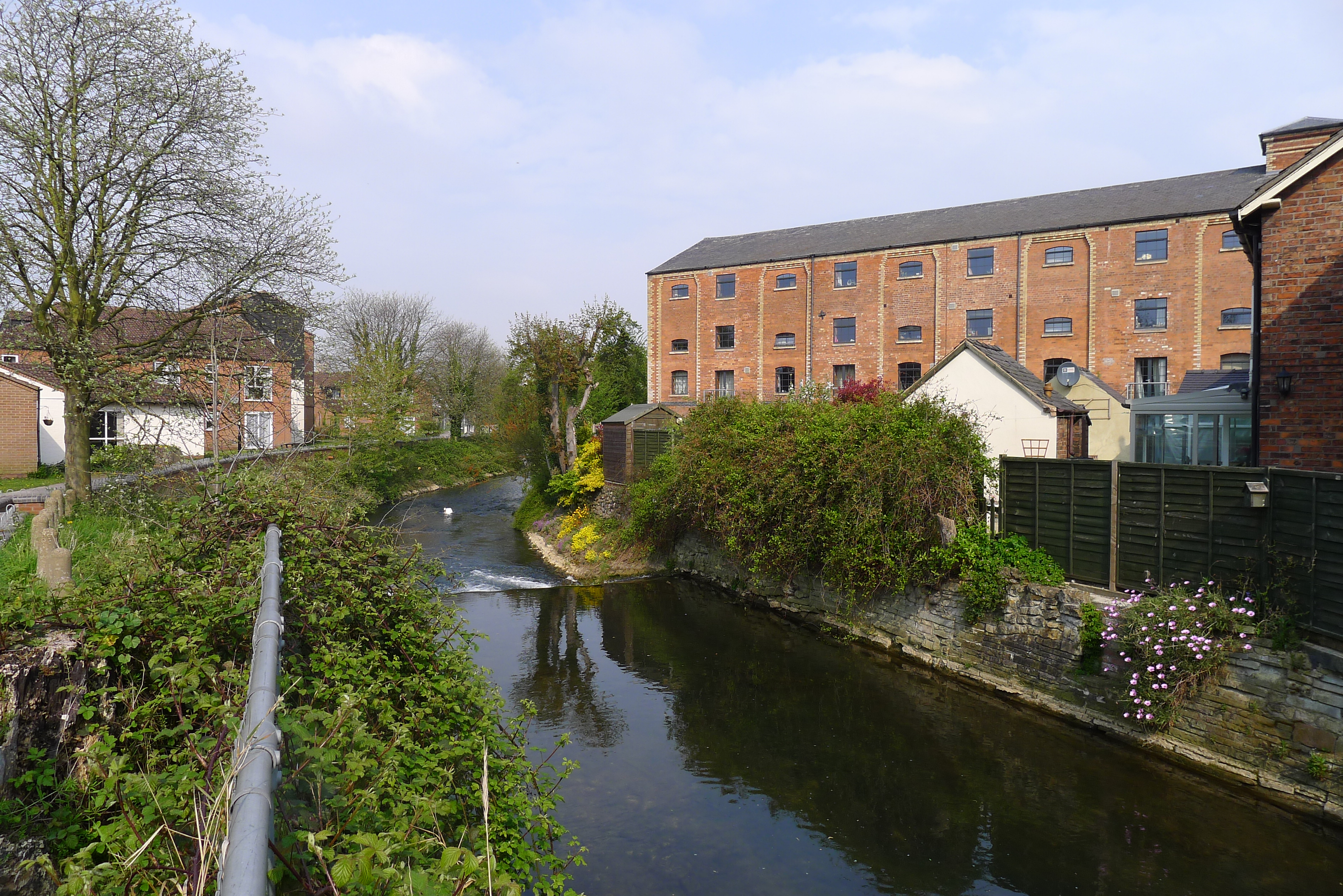
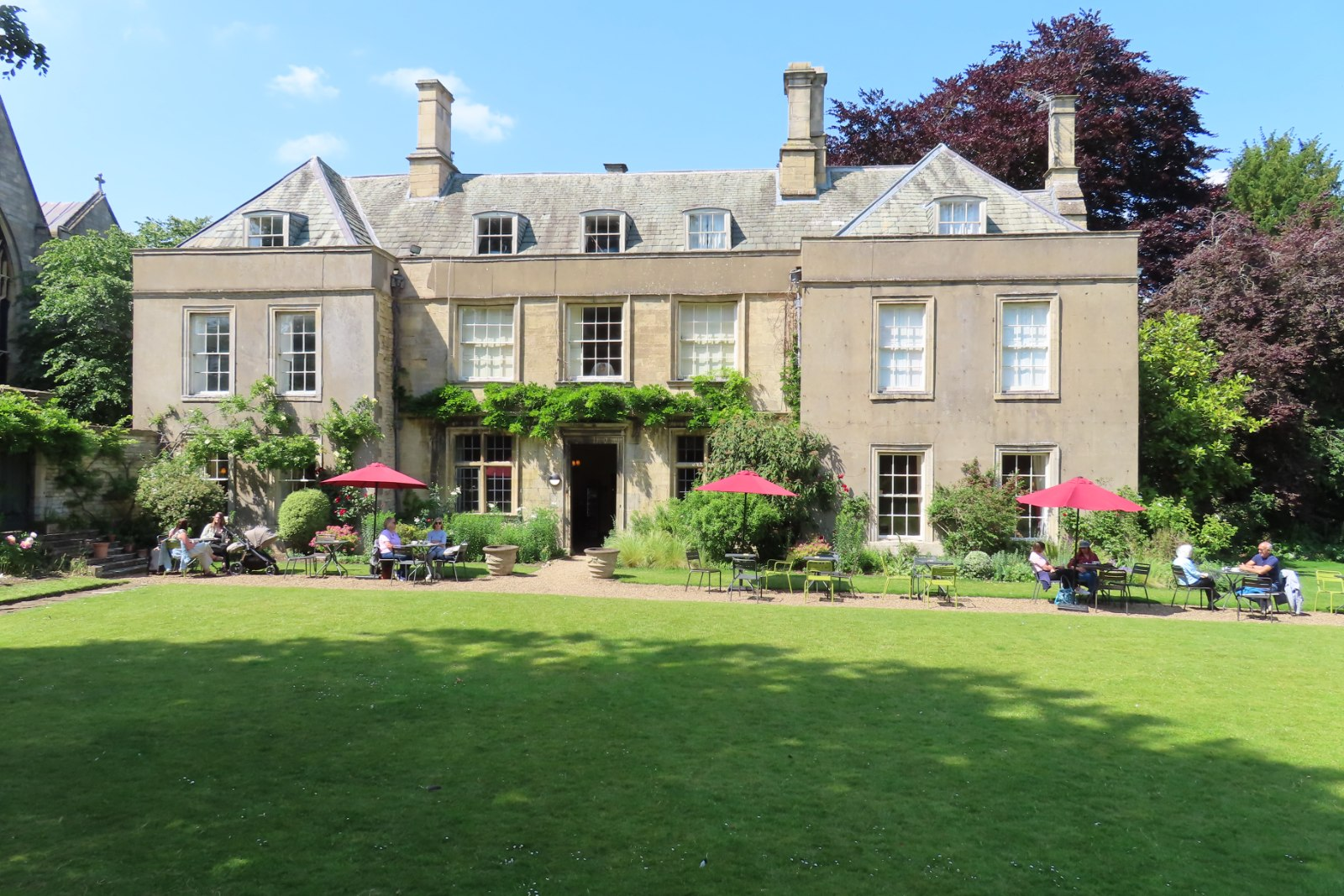
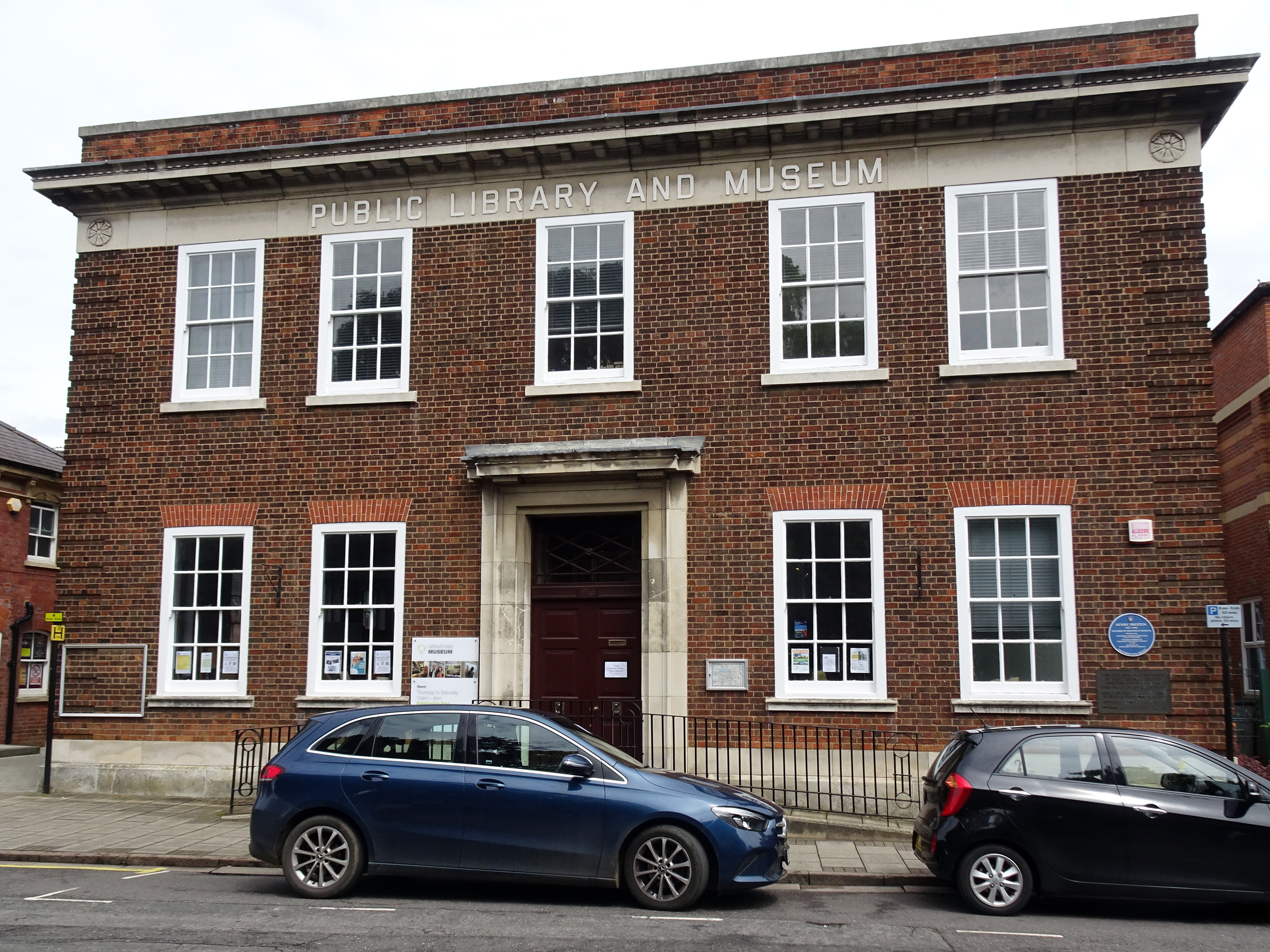
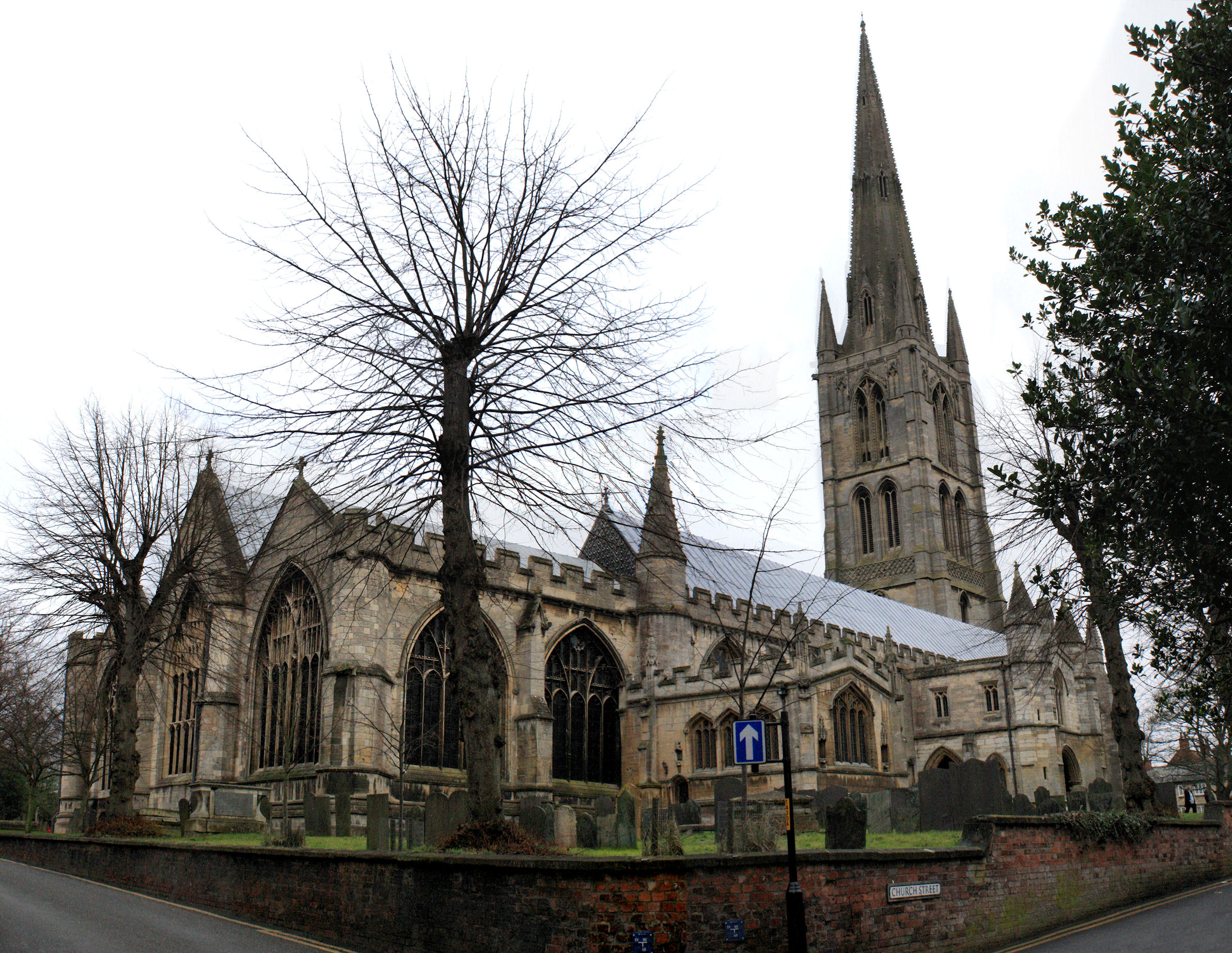
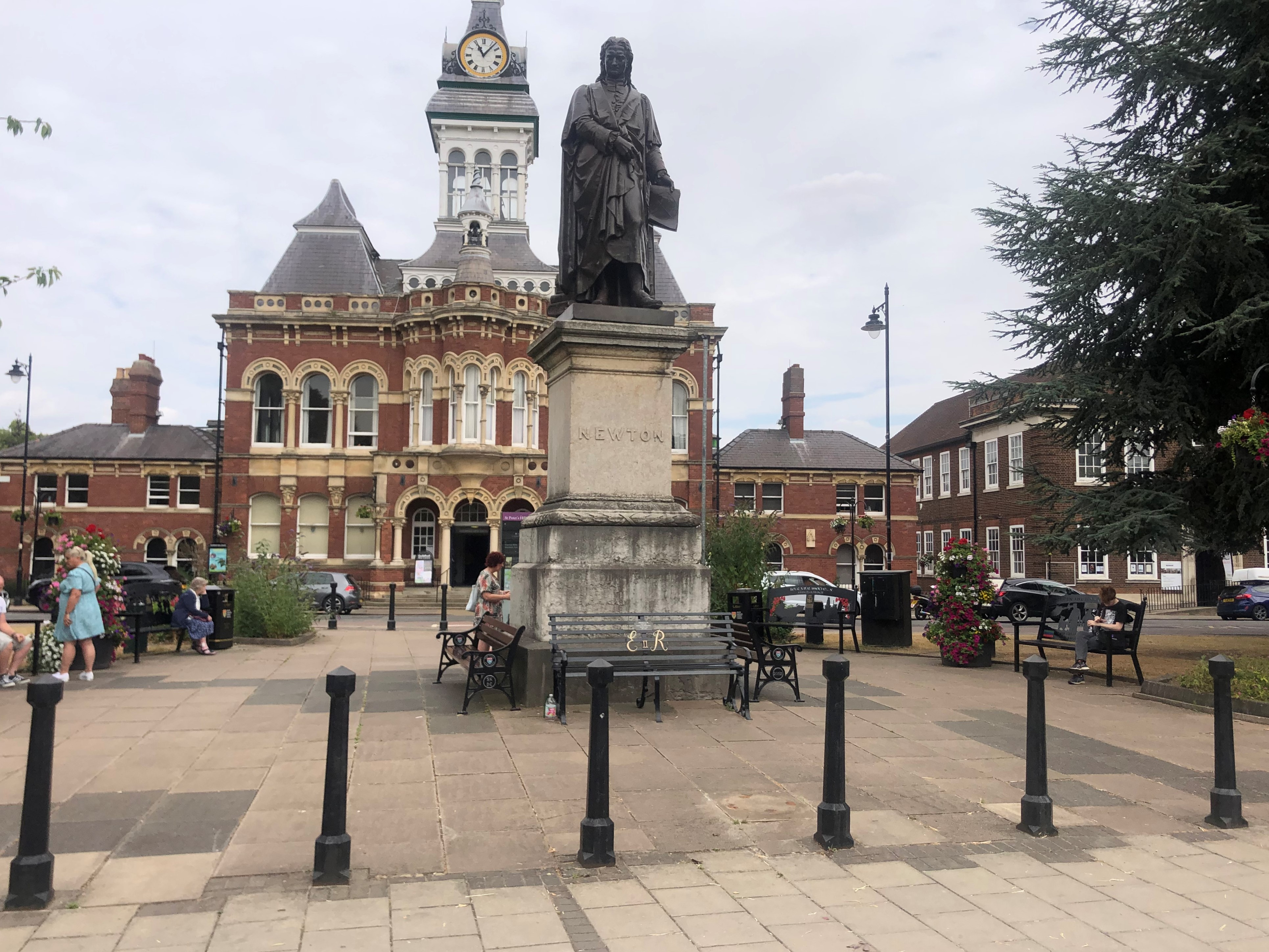
- Market Place River Witham Grantham House Museum St Wulfram's Grantham Guildhall, Sir Isaac Newton statue

- Coat of Arms

- Location within Lincolnshire
- Population: 44,898 (2021)
- OS grid reference: SK9136
  - London: 100 mi (160 km) S
- Civil parish: Grantham
- District: South Kesteven
- Shire county: Lincolnshire
- Region: East Midlands
- Country: England
- Sovereign state: United Kingdom
- Areas of the town: List: Arnoldfield (ward); Barrowby (village); Barrowby Gate (ward); Belton (village); Cold Harbour (village); Gonerby Hill Foot; Great Gonerby (village); Harlaxton (village); Harrowby (ward); Harrowby (village); Little Ponton (village); Londonthorpe (village); Manthorpe (village); Old Somerby (village); Somerby Hill; Springfield (ward); St Vincent's (ward); St Wulfram's (ward)
- Post town: Grantham
- Postcode district: NG31
- Dialling code: 01476
- Police: Lincolnshire
- Fire: Lincolnshire
- Ambulance: East Midlands
- UK Parliament: Grantham and Bourne
- Website: Grantham Town Council

Grantham (/ˈɡrænθəm/) is a market town and civil parish in the South Kesteven district of Lincolnshire, England. It is situated on the banks of the River Witham and bounded to the west by the A1 road; it lies 23 miles (37 km) south of Lincoln and 22 miles (35 km) east of Nottingham. The population at the 2021 census was 44,898. The town is the largest settlement and the administrative centre of the South Kesteven District. The villages of Manthorpe, Great Gonerby, Barrowby, Londonthorpe and Harlaxton form outlying suburbs of the town.

The UK's former prime minister Margaret Thatcher was born and raised in Grantham. The mathematician and scientist Isaac Newton was educated at the King's School. The town was the workplace of the UK's first warranted female police officer, Edith Smith, in 1914. The UK's first running diesel engine was made there in 1892 and the first tractor in 1896. Thomas Paine worked there as an excise officer in the 1760s.

== Etymology ==
Grantham's name is first attested in the Domesday Book (1086); its origin is not known with certainty. The ending -hām is Old English and means "homestead". The first part of the name may either be the personal name Granta or derive from the Old English word grand (gravel), implying either "Granta's homestead" or "homestead by gravel". In the early 20th century, the town's name was still pronounced /ˈɡræntəm/ or /ˈɡrɑːntəm/, but as people moved more frequently and became more literate, they began to derive the place name from its spelling and the pronunciation shifted to /ˈɡrænθəm/ (the t and h being construed as representing a th phoneme). This was already becoming common in 1920 and the later pronunciation is now the norm. (Note: Granfum is also sometimes heard in the early 21st century.)

== Prehistory ==
Much of Grantham's early archaeology lies buried beneath the modern town, making it "difficult to unravel". Early prehistoric hunter-gatherers visited the area. Scattered Stone Age tools have been found, the earliest being a Palaeolithic axe on the Cherry Orchard Estate, dating between 40,000 and 150,000 years ago. The next earliest material consist of Mesolithic flints crafted 4,000 to 8,000 years ago and found round Gonerby Hill and the riverside in the south of the town. Neolithic people probably settled in the Grantham area for its proximity to the rivers and its fertile soils; material suggesting settlement in this period has been found at Great Ponton.

Other scattered finds have been unearthed around the town. Remains of a Neolithic ritual site on the parish boundary between Harlaxton and Grantham are known from aerial photography. Bronze Age artefacts include pottery vessels, with human remains found in Little Gonerby, a Beaker pot, Beaker pottery sherds, cinerary urns and a food vessel, and a later cemetery at Belton Lane, but there is little direct evidence of Bronze Age settlement in the area of the modern town. Little is known about it in the Iron Age, though ditched enclosures and a field system of this date are known to lie off Gorse Lane.

Various Romano-British coins and pottery finds have emerged in Grantham; a burial and pottery from the 2nd century AD were uncovered off Trent Road in 1981. Small settlements or farmsteads from the period have been discerned on the hills overlooking Grantham from the east, and another has been found in Barrowby. There were probably Romano-British farmsteads on the site of the modern town, but the wet soils round the Mowbeck and flooding by the Witham probably made it hard for a larger settlement to grow there. Three kilometres to the south of the modern town, an important Roman site has been found at Saltersford, a crossing of the River Witham near Little Ponton.

Extensive finds and evidence of a significant Romano-British occupation have emerged in the vicinity since the 19th century; it has been tentatively identified by some scholars as Causennae, mentioned in the Antonine Itinerary, and sat at the place where the River Witham was crossed by the Salter's Way, a trade route connecting the salt-producing coastal and marshland regions with the Midlands. Salter's Way may also have crossed Ermine Street (now B6403) at Cold Harbour, 4 km south-east of Grantham. Saltersford may have been a small town with a market for local farmsteads and smaller settlements.

== Medieval town ==
=== Origins ===
The local historian Michael Honeybone has "no doubt that the town of Grantham was established during [Anglo-]Saxon times"; its name suggests it emerged in the earliest phase of Anglo-Saxon settlement, probably by the 7th century. The archaeological evidence for this is limited to finds indicating cemeteries at the sites of the Central School in Manthorpe and the junction of Bridge End Road and London Road in the town, and to small quantities of pottery sherds found on London Road, Belton Lane, Saltersford, New Somerby and Barrowby.

The town's Saxon-period history is obscure and debated. The medievalist Sir Frank Stenton argued that Grantham probably emerged as an "important estate centre" before the Viking invasions in the 9th century and then functioned as a "minor local capital" in the Danelaw. By contrast, the historian David Roffe has argued that the town and its outlying soke were established in the 1040s or 1050s by Queen Edith and Leofric, Earl of Mercia, to strengthen their hands in the county at the expense of Siward, Earl of Northumbria. They may have also created St Wulfram's Church either as a new place of worship or as one revived from a possible earlier cell of Crowland Abbey.

Roffe argues that Siward's death in 1055 made Grantham's new role less important; as such, its soke only grew to its full extent after the Norman Conquest of England, when the king merged it with the soke of Great Ponton. Whatever its origins, by the time of the Domesday Book (1086, the earliest documentary evidence for the settlement), Grantham was a town and royal manor; under its jurisdiction fell soke comprising lands in 16 villages. St Wulfram's served this extended parish area.

=== Royal manor ===
Grantham's Domesday entries show it as an estate centre, where Queen Edith had a hall before 1066. Twenty years later, the king had the manor; there were four mills and eight acres of meadow, but no arable land. The demesne appears to have been land now known as Earlesfield in Great Gonerby. There were 111 burgesses and 72 bordars, possibly labourers or craftsmen, indicating that Grantham was both a manor and a borough where the lord retained exclusive rights. (Note: Alongside this estate, a smaller fee was held by the Abbot of Peterborough, whose tenant was called Kolgrimr in 1086, and 77 tofts held by sokeman tenants of thegns settled nearby.) It was a valuable asset, used by the king to reward loyal followers. By 1129, the manor and soke had been granted to Rabel de Tancarville, the king's chamberlain in Normandy. He sided against King Stephen during The Anarchy (1135–1154) and his lands were probably forfeited on his death in 1140, although restored to his son William and confirmed in the early 1180s. The king retook the manor after William's heir Ralph de Tancarville failed to support him in Normandy.

In 1205, the king granted it to his ally William de Warenne, 5th Earl of Surrey. It was held as a life interest and reverted to the Crown on his widow's death in 1249, but regranted to his son the 6th earl in 1266. On his death in 1304, it reverted to the crown and was soon granted to Aymer de Valence, but had been regranted to Warenne's grandson, the 7th earl, by 1312. Four years later, it was resettled on the 7th earl for life with reversion to the crown. William de Bohun, 1st Earl of Northampton was granted the reversion in 1337 and took seisin ten years later.

After his death, it reverted again to the Crown and in 1363 Edward II granted it to his son Edmund of Langley, Duke of York, through whose heirs it passed to Richard of York, 3rd Duke of York, a major figure in the Wars of the Roses and rival of Henry VI. After Richard's death in 1460, Henry's Queen Margaret of Anjou attacked Grantham in 1461, but was defeated by Richard's son Edward later that year, who took the throne as Edward IV.

Two years later, Grantham was rewarded for loyalty to the Yorkist cause when the king granted the borough a charter of incorporation, as a self-governing council – the Corporation of Grantham headed by an Alderman – with various freedoms. (Note: The manor stayed in royal hands and was often granted to a queen or queen mother for life. In 1696, William III granted it without reversion to William Bentinck, 1st Earl of Portland. The earl's eventual successor, the 3rd Duke of Portland, sold the manor to Lord William Manners in 1767. He gave it to his illegitimate son John Manners, who married Louisa Tollemache, a daughter of the Earl of Dysart, a title she later inherited in her own right; their son, William, along with Buckminster Park inherited the lordship of the manor. He was created a baronet and adopted the surname Talmash (or Tollemache). It then passed to his son, who also inherited the Dysart title as the 8th Earl, in 1833. By the late 20th century, the lordship was held by trustees of the Buckminster Estate.)

=== Economy and government ===
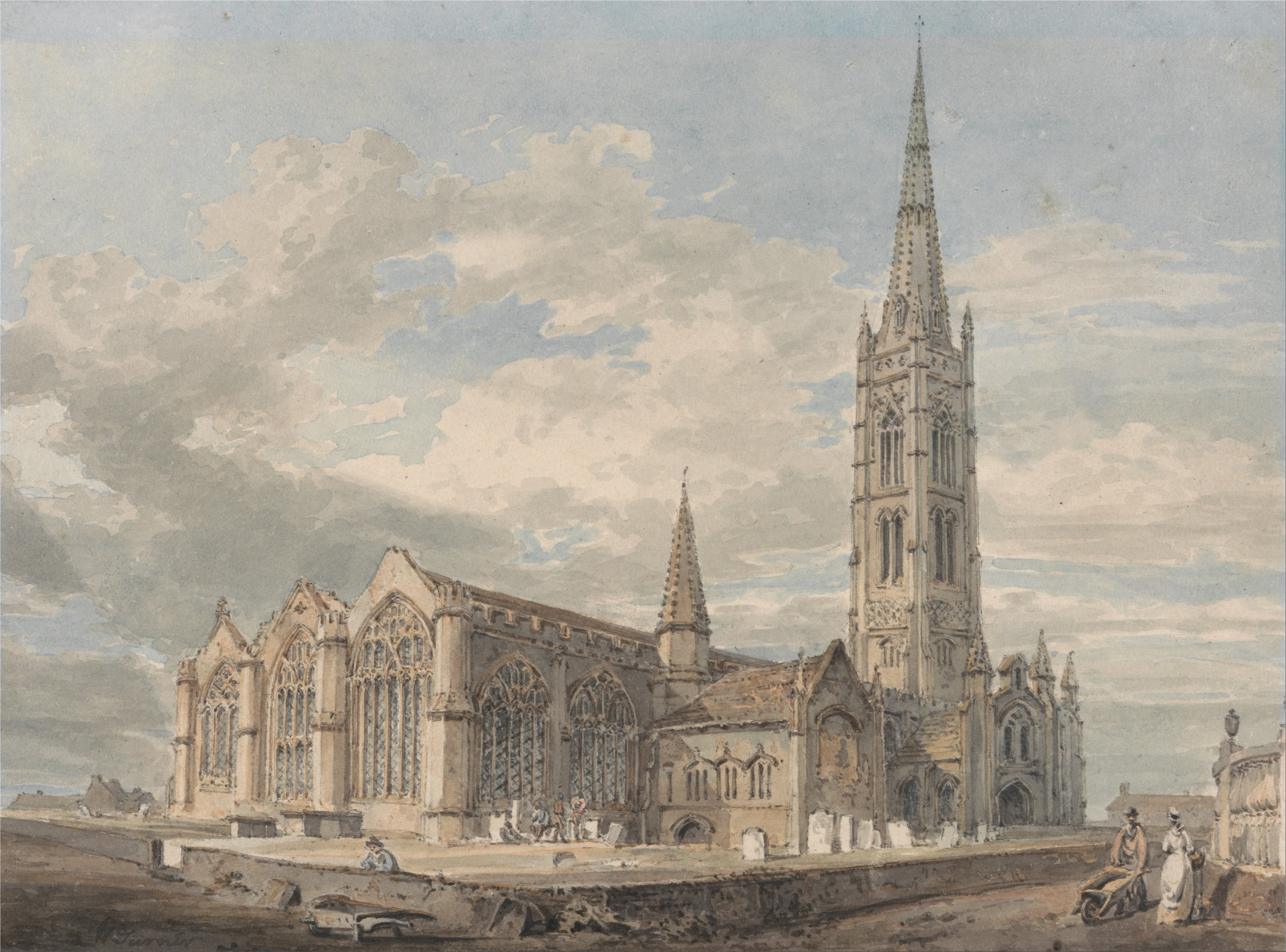
Watercolour and graphite painting of Grantham Church by J. M. W. Turner (1797)

Its lords encouraged Grantham to expand as a commercial centre. By the late 11th century, it was an "important market town". The wool trade prospered, benefiting from its proximity to grazing lands on the Lincoln Heath. This wealth contributed towards the building of St Wulfram's Church. Wool shops were in Grantham in 1218 and Walkergate (now Watergate) was recorded in 1257, indicating the presence of fullers (walkers), who played a role in processing wool. Cloth manufacture declined around this time, but wool continued to be produced for trading, primarily for export from Boston. Wool merchants are recorded from the town in the late 13th century (foremost being was Roger de Belvoir, who contributed over £296 to the Wool Prize of 1297). By this time, merchants from Italy, Saint-Omer and Amiens were active in the town.

In 1269, the earl granted the town free tronage – the right to weigh wool without paying a toll. Less than 30 years later, its merchants were asked to send a representative to counsel the king. The wool trade boomed in the early 14th century; the town's merchants traded at least 980 sacks of wool at Boston during Edward II's reign, half from the de Chesterton family. In 1312, the earl granted the burgesses various freedoms and the right to elect a leader (the Alderman), codifying a longstanding informal arrangement. Later in the century, the king sought to raise revenues by taxing the wool trade; some Grantham merchants, including the wealthy Roger de Wollesthorpe, acted as creditors to the king.

England's falling population, continued taxation of wool exports and the growth of cloth exports and monopolisation led to the wool trade declining by the mid-15th century. Cloth exports became more important nationally. Grantham had a small cloth industry, but it could not compete with new fulling mills, which required fast-flowing water. Its merchants continued to trade in wool and it remained a dominant aspect of the town's economy. Other industries also existed during the Middle Ages; there is evidence of wine trading, brewing, parchment making, weaving, and other trades and crafts.

The bridging of the River Trent at Newark by the late 12th century realigned the Great North Road so that it passed through Grantham, bringing traffic to the town as an important stopping place and leading to the development of inns, such as The George and The Angel. By the 16th century, the economy was diverse. The largest sector was the leather trade, employing a quarter of the known workforce; distribution, food, drink and agricultural trades were also important. By that time, clothing and textiles each accounted for less than 10 per cent of the town's workers.

== Modern history ==
=== 19th and 20th centuries ===
The Lincoln Theatre Company of actors took a 21-year lease on the theatre in 1800. Westgate Hall, which was commissioned as the local corn exchange, was completed in 1852.

The town developed when the railway came. The Nottingham Line (London and North Eastern Railway) arrived first in 1850, then the London line (Great Northern Railway (Great Britain) – from Peterborough to Retford) arrived in 1852. The Boston, Sleaford and Midland Counties Railway arrived in 1857.

Gas lighting appeared in 1833. The corporation became a municipal borough council in 1835; Little Gonerby and Spittlegate were added to the borough in 1879. The town had been in the wapentake of Loveden and included three townships of Manthorpe with Little Gonerby, Harrowby and Spittlegate with Houghton and Walton.

The former Grantham Golf Club was founded in 1894 and continued until the onset of the Second World War.

Until the 1970s, the housing estates west of the town centre were green fields. Green Hill, on the A52, was literally a green hill. In July 1975 the National Association of Ratepayers' Action Groups (NARAG) was formed in Grantham by John Wilks, its chairman, as a forerunner of the TaxPayers' Alliance.

=== Military history ===
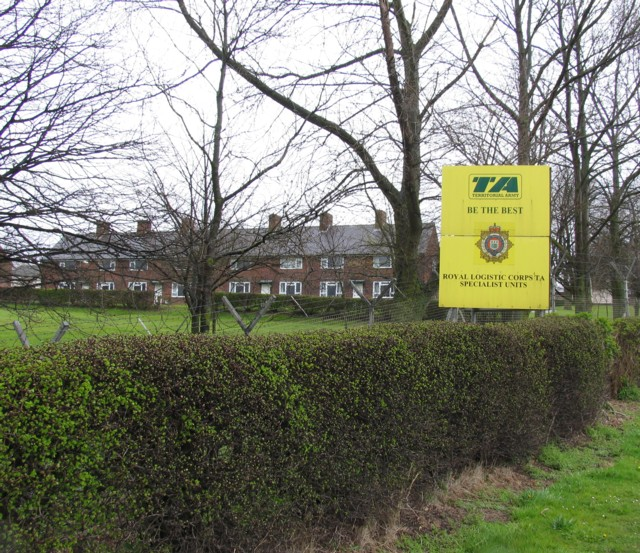
Army barracks in the east of the town, next to the A52

The town has a long military history since the completion of the Old Barracks in 1858.

==== Dambusters ====
During the Dambuster Raids of the Royal Air Force (RAF) in May 1943, the RAF Bomber Command's No. 5 Group and operation HQ were in St Vincents, a building later owned by Aveling-Barford and housing a district council planning department. It was built by Richard Hornsby in 1865 and lived in by his son; it is now a private house. In 1944 (including D-Day), it was the headquarters for the USAAF's Ninth Air Force's IX Troop Carrier Command, known as Grantham Lodge.

==== RAF Spitalgate ====
RAF Spitalgate trained pilots during both world wars, initially as a Royal Flying Corps establishment. It was the first military airfield in Lincolnshire, but has never been an operational fighter or bomber base; although it did see operational service during the 1943 invasion of Europe as a base for American and Polish gliders and parachutists. It closed officially in 1974. The Women's Royal Air Force had been there from 1960 until closure. (as RAF Wilmslow was closing due to the imminent ending of National Service), and moved to RAF Hereford (now the home of SAS).

After closure, RAF Spitalgate became the Royal Corps of Transport, later Royal Logistic Corps barracks: Prince William of Gloucester Barracks, named after Prince William of Gloucester. Grantham College used the site's two football pitches for their South Lincolnshire Football Development Centre (from September 2004). After closure in 1975 a vehicle test centre was built on the outfield; this closed in 2011. The large mast on the base was part of the BT microwave network.

The Queen's Royal Lancers (part of the Royal Armoured Corps) have their RHQ on the base.

==== RAF Regiment ====
The RAF Regiment was formed north-east of the town in parts of Londonthorpe and Harrowby Without during December 1941 with its headquarters at RAF Belton Park, which is recognised as its birthplace. The Belton Park estate had been a training centre for the Machine Gun Corps from November 1915.

The RAF Regiment reached in excess of 66,000 personnel and was housed at RAF Belton Park (the Regiment's first depot), RAF Folkingham and RAF North Witham during training.

=== Women's police force ===
Grantham was the second police force, after London, to recruit and train women police officers. It was the first provincial force to ask the newly formed Corps of Women's Police Volunteers to supply them with occasional policewomen, recognising them as useful for dealing with women and juveniles. In December 1914, Damer Dawson, the Chief of the Corps, came to Grantham to supervise the preliminary work of the women police. Officers stationed there were Miss Allen and Miss Harburn. In 1915, Grantham magistrates swore in Edith Smith, making her the first policewoman in Britain with full powers of arrest.

=== Industrial history ===
==== Richard Hornsby & Sons ====
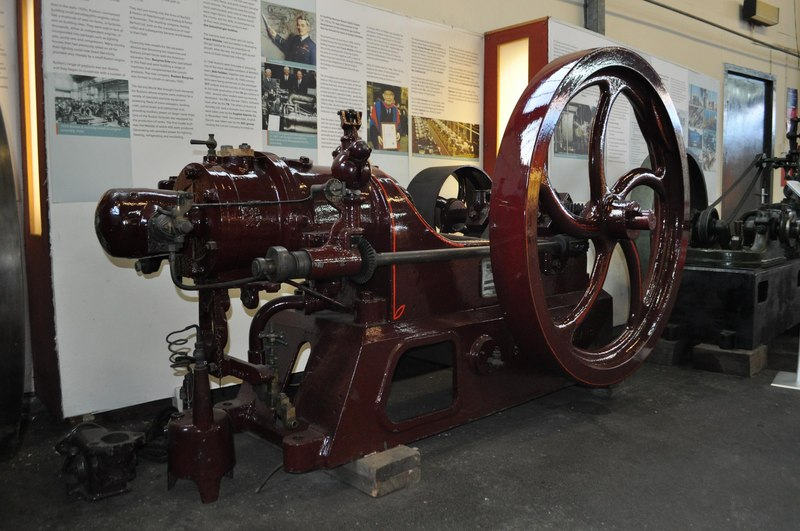
Hornsby oil engine at the Museum of Lincolnshire Life

Richard Hornsby and Richard Seaman founded Seaman & Hornsby, iron founders and millwrights, at Spittlegate in Grantham in 1810. The company was renamed Richard Hornsby & Sons when Seaman retired in 1828. Products included ploughs and seed drills.

From 1840 until 1906, the company built steam engines; thereafter, production shifted to oil, petrol and gas engines. It employed 378 men in 1878 and 3,500 in 1914.

In 1905, Richard Hornsby & Sons invented a caterpillar track for a machine using Hornsby's oil engines; these engines were developed by Yorkshireman Herbert Akroyd Stuart, from which compression-ignition principle the diesel engine evolved, being manufactured in Grantham from 8 July 1892. Although such engines were not wholly compression-ignition derived, a prototype high-pressure version was built at Hornsby's in 1892. It was developed by Thomas Henry Barton – later to found Nottingham's Barton Transport – whereby ignition was achieved solely through compression; it ran continuously for six hours as the first known diesel engine. In the town, Hornsby's built Elsham House, whose grounds became Grantham College, and the Shirley Croft. Its site in Houghton Road was bought from Lord Dysart.

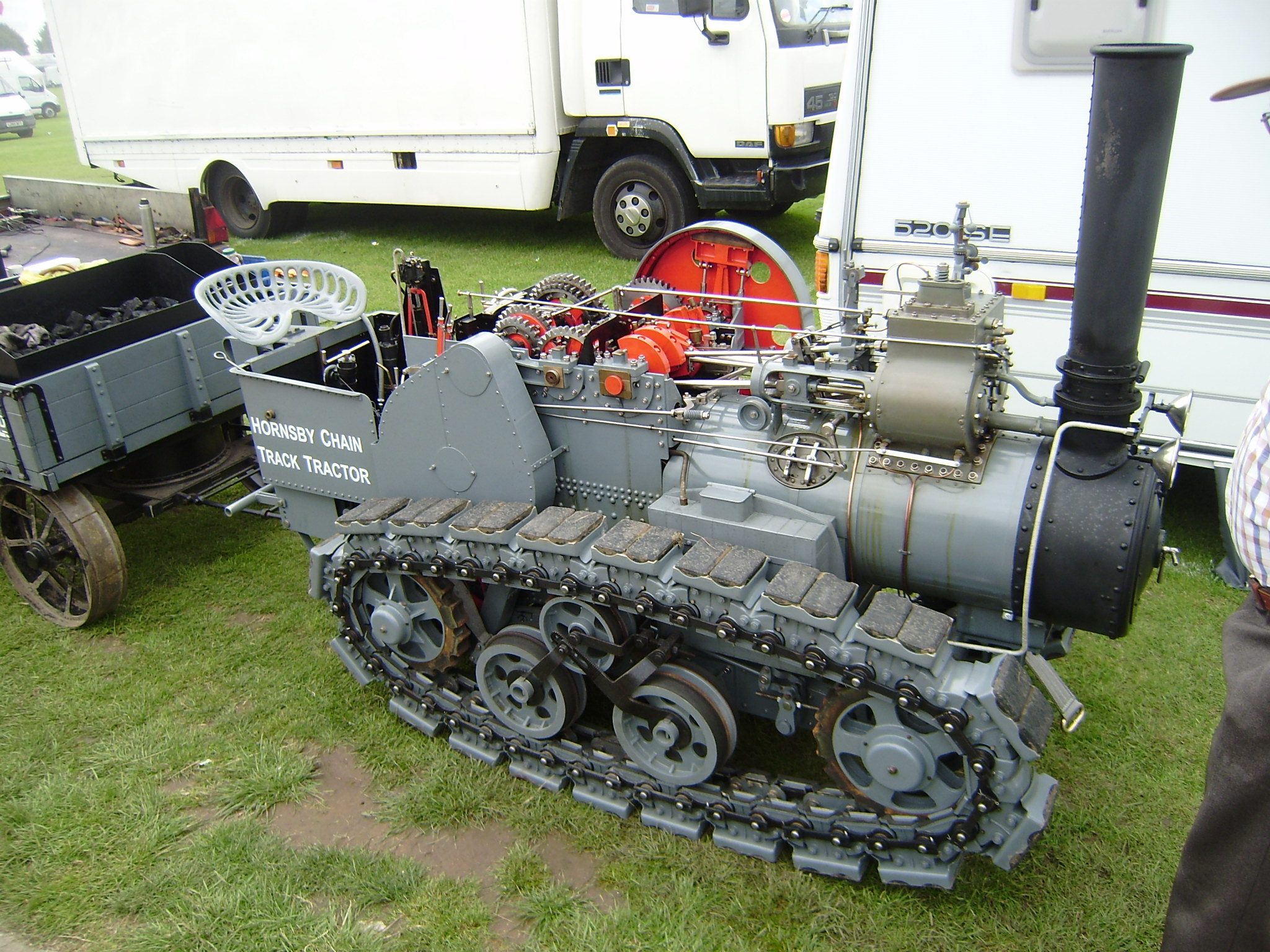
Scale model of Hornsby 1910 steam caterpillar tractor

In 1910, Hornsby presented its chain-track vehicle to the British Army, which then bought four caterpillar tractors to tow artillery. At the demonstration, a British transport officer suggested putting armour plating and a gun on a Hornsby tractor, so creating some sort of self-propelled gun. David Roberts, managing director of Hornsby, did not pursue the idea, but later expressed regret at not having done so. Four years later, Hornsby sold the patent for its caterpillar track to the Holt Manufacturing Company of California, USA, for $8,000, having itself sold only one caterpillar tractor commercially.

The Holt system was superior to Hornsby's, but the Hornsby transmission was what Holt really wanted. Thanks in part to this acquisition, Holt eventually became the successful Caterpillar Inc. tractor company. In 1918, Hornsby's amalgamated with Rustons as Ruston & Hornsby. In the 1920s, the company had its own orchestra in the town; the site was a diesel engine plant. During the Second World War, the company made tanks such as the Matilda at the Grantham factory. Ruston and Hornsby left in 1963 and most of the factory was taken over by a subsidiary, Alfred Wiseman Gears, which itself left in 1968.

==== Barford's ====
The agricultural engine and steamroller manufacturer Aveling and Porter of Rochester, Kent, merged with Barford & Perkins of Peterborough as Aveling-Barford Ltd in 1934; this was largely with financial help from Ruston & Hornsby, as both firms had entered into administration. The new company took a former site of Hornsbys, naming it the Invicta works, from the motto on the coat of arms of Kent, which translates as "unconquered"; all Aveling & Porter machinery was brought from Kent by rail.

During the 1970s, Barford's was the town's largest employer, with around 2,000 employees. It initially prospered, but declined with the sinking market for large dumper trucks and road rollers. In 1947, its agricultural division, Barfords of Belton, developed the world's smallest tractor, the Barford Atom, weighing 177 pounds (80 kilograms).

Now Barford Construction Equipment, it makes dumpers for construction sites, being owned by Wordsworth Holdings PLC, owned in turn by the entrepreneur Duncan Wordsworth until it went into administration in March 2010. A restructuring package resulted in ownership transferring to Bowdon Investment Group in May 2010. It is now known as Invictas Engineering.

A trailer company, Crane-Fruehauf, moved into part of the factory from its former home at Dereham, when it went into receivership in early 2005.

==== BMARC ====
British Manufacture and Research Company (British Marc Ltd or BMARC), in Springfield Road, made munitions, notably the Hispano cannon for the Spitfire and Hurricane from 1937 onwards. It was owned by the Swiss Oerlikon from 1971 until 1988, becoming part of Astra Holdings plc. The firm was bought by British Aerospace in 1992, which then closed the site. It has now been developed as a housing estate. The site's former offices are now business units for the Springfield Business Centre. Grantham's register office moved there in 2007.

=== Former developments ===
In 1968, Reads of Liverpool built a canning factory in Springfield Road to serve Melton Mowbray. It became American Can, then Pechiney (French) in 1988 and finally Impress (Dutch). It closed in 2006 and was demolished in 2007, to make way for a housing estate. Ransome & Marles had a ball bearing factory in the town until 1957, when production was moved to Newark.

Mowbray and Co Ltd, a brewery, was bought by J.W. Green of Luton. It was founded in September 1828 and became a public company in 1880, but closed in 1967.

== Geography ==
Grantham and surrounding settlements, roads, railways and watercourses. The urban area is in grey; areas over 100m in elevation are shaded beige.

Grantham is a town in the South Kesteven district of Lincolnshire, a non-metropolitan county in the East Midlands of England. Until 1974, it was a municipal borough; it is now a civil parish and bounded by the parishes of Great Gonerby to the north-west, Belton and Manthorpe to the north, Londonthorpe and Harrowby Without to the north-east and east, Little Ponton and Stroxton to the south, Harlaxton to the south-west, and Barrowby to the west. Its urban area is almost entirely within the parish, though The Spinney housing estate, Alma Park industrial estate and part of the Bridge End Road housing estate are in Londonthorpe and Harrowby Without.

=== Topography and geology ===
The town lies in the valley of the River Witham, its core at the Witham's confluence with the Mowbeck (or Mow Beck). The Witham flows south–north through Grantham. The Mowbeck, which rises from springs at Harlaxton about 3 miles (4.8 km) to the south-west of the town, is culverted behind Westgate and Brook Street until it joins the Witham at White Bridge.

The floor of the Witham valley – 50–60 m above sea level in the town centre – is underlain by mudstone of the Charmouth formation of the Lower Jurassic period (199–183 million years ago). This formation is overlain by Belton sand and gravel laid down in estuaries and rivers in the Quaternary period up to 3 million years ago. The river courses are overlain by Quaternary alluvium and to the north by river terrace deposits. The soil around the route of the Witham is wet, acidic, sandy and loamy; its fertility is poor.

As the ground rises on the town's eastern and southern fringes, it is underlain by Jurassic Marlstone rocks of ferruginous sandstone and ironstone formed 190–174 million years ago, and then by Whitby Mudstone of 174–183 million years ago. The land rises sharply to form the Lincoln Cliff that marks the edge of the urban area and start of the Lincoln Heath and Kesteven Uplands, which are capped by Jurassic Oolitic Limestone, mostly overlain by shallow, free-draining, lime-rich soils.

To the west, the town is near the edge of the low-lying Vale of Belvoir, but fringed by an escarpment rising in places to over 100 m to form the hills on which sit Barrowby, Great Gonerby, the Green Hill and Earlesfield suburban areas and the business parks off Trent Road. These hills are of siltstone and mudstone of the Jurassic Dyrham Formation, which line the edges of the Witham and Mowbeck valleys and the shallow valley of Barrowby Stream. At its highest, the scarp is capped by Jurassic ferruginous sandstone and ironstone rocks of the Marlstone formation. There are some head deposits and pleistocene glaciofluvial deposits of sand and gravel east of Barrowby. The soil in the lower areas is slowly permeable, seasonally wet and slightly acidic, though base-rich. On higher ground it tends to be slightly acidic and base-rich, but freely draining and highly fertile.

Grantham Canal, which opened in 1797, closely follows the route of the Mowbeck from Echo Farm into the town. West of there it cuts through a valley north of Harlaxton into the Vale of Belvoir, eventually reaching West Bridgford near Nottingham.

=== Urban area ===
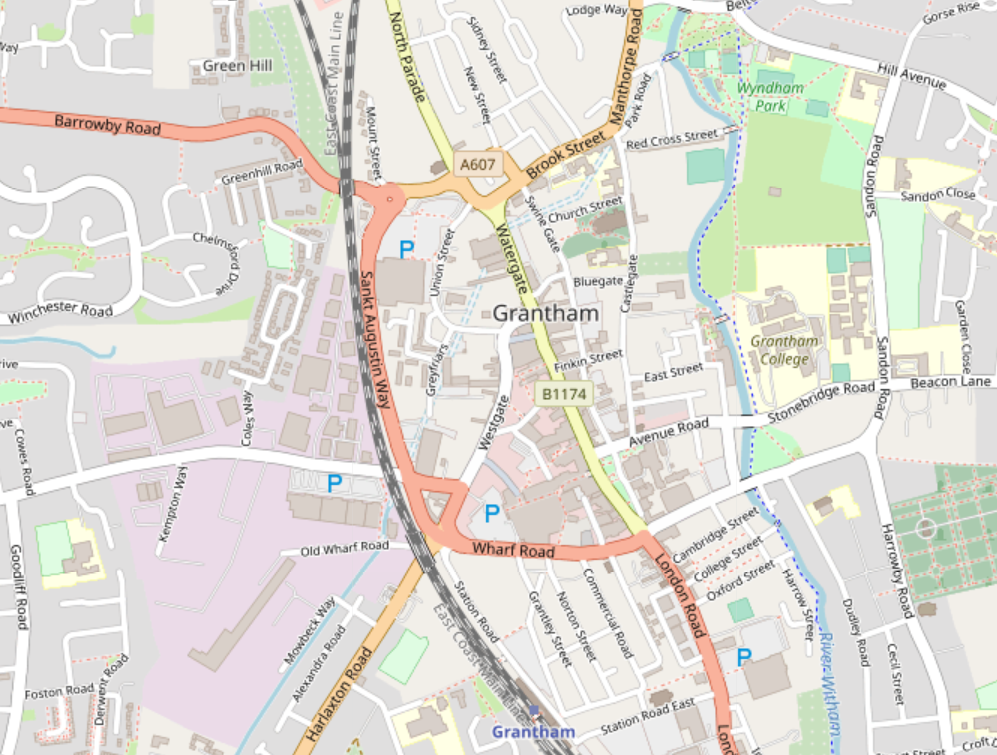
Map of Grantham town centre. London Road, Wharf Road, Sankt Augustin Way and Barrowby Road form the A52. Harlaxton Road is the A607.

The historical core of Grantham is bounded by Westgate, Brook Street and Castlegate, and includes the High Street down to St Peter's Hill. This is the town's main retail and commercial area, which includes many historic buildings. Between Westgate and the A52 to the west are postwar retail buildings and blocks of flats. North of it is 18th, 19th and 20th-century suburban housing focused on North Parade, which include villas and terraced housing.

Further north, off Gonerby Road and Manthorpe Road (A607), these give way to large, low-density, suburban, privately owned housing on estates mostly built in the 1970s and 1980s. Those at the base of Gonerby Hill are known as Gonerby Hill Foot and lie west of the railway line, to the east of which developments are contiguous with the historical core of Manthorpe village. (Note: There is some 1930s-era and earlier post-war housing lining Manthorpe Road, the A607, and some older housing in Gonerby Hill Foot.)

South of the town centre, suburban housing takes the form of late-Victorian and Edwardian brick, terraced and villa houses in grid-plan layouts, initially built for industrial workers and now largely owned or let privately. Alongside some housing in Harlaxton Road (A607), most of these streets cluster round the railway station and nearby retail and industrial units in an area known as Spittlegate (also spelled Spitalgate or Spittalgate), the town cemetery – an area called New Somerby in older maps – and the Wharf Road, London Road and Bridge End Road stretches of the A52. Further south-east, low-density, mostly privately owned, suburban housing estates of the 1970s and 1980s cluster round the A52, marking the edge of the town's urban area in an area of rising ground that forms part of Somerby Hill. Further east, off the A52, are the Prince William of Gloucester Barracks, on the brow of the hill.

The north-east fringe of the urban area is marked by 20th-century development. An exception is a piece of land east of the Witham and north of Stonebridge Road that includes schools and colleges and portions of a 19th-century barracks complex south of greenspace, including Wyndham Park. Otherwise the area between the Witham, Belton Lane, Londonthorpe Lane and the Lincoln Cliff has suburban housing, mostly privately owned with some let by housing associations. It includes part of the Harrowby Estate, begun in 1928 as council housing). The part round Belton Lane and Harrowby Lane is a low-density mix of pre-First World War, inter-war and post-war houses; the remainder of the large estate and the Cherry Orchard Estate appeared in the immediate post-war period in medium density, on a layout inspired by the garden city movement. South of Londonthorpe Lane and north-east of the other estates are medium and high-density housing areas dating largely from the 1970s to the early 21st century; The northernmost, known as The Spinney or Sunningdale, adjoins the post-war Alma Park industrial estate off Londonthorpe Lane.

The town's western fringe sits between the railway line, the A1 bypass and the Kesteven Uplands. North of the canal are large, varied developments mostly from the 20th century, including the Earlesfield estate, begun as a council estate in the 1920s and expanded in the postwar period, industrial estates, and a leisure centre complex, all south of Barrowby Stream, by the expansive 1980s estate on Green Hill, the Edwardian and Victorian villas lining Barrowby Road, and the large 1980s and 1990s estate to its north. Most of this is privately owned, but some is let by housing associations. The canal basin is lined with industrial, warehouse, retail and office buildings that continue up to Dysart Road. South of them are Harlaxton Road (A607) and Springfield Road, around which separate residential developments have been built. These include inter-war homes in Huntingtower Road, a 21st-century estate centred on Hudson Way, post-war social housing at Walton Gardens, post-war housing Denton Avenue and late-20th-century developments at Harris Way.

=== Climate ===
Grantham, like the rest of the British Isles, experiences a temperate, maritime climate with warm summers and cool winters. Data from the weather station nearest to Grantham, at Cranwell, 10 miles (16 km) away, shows an average daily mean temperature of 9.8 °C (49.6 °F) fluctuates from a peak of 16.9 °C (62.4 °F) in July to 3.9 °C (39.0 °F) in January. The average high temperature is 13.7 °C (56.7 °F), though monthly averages vary from 6.7 °C (44.1 °F) in January and December to 21.8 °C (71.2 °F) in July; the average low is 5.9 °C (42.6 °F), reaching lowest in February at 0.8 °C (33.4 °F) and highest in July and August at 12.0 °C (53.6 °F).

Climate data for Cranwell WMO ID: 03379; coordinates 53°01′52″N 0°30′13″W; elevation: 62 m (203 ft); 1991–2020 normals, extremes 1930–present
Month	Jan	Feb	Mar	Apr	May	Jun	Jul	Aug	Sep	Oct	Nov	Dec	Year
Record high °C (°F)	15.0 (59.0)	18.3 (64.9)	23.2 (73.8)	26.3 (79.3)	32.3 (90.1)	36.4 (97.5)	39.9 (103.8)	35.2 (95.4)	31.6 (88.9)	28.6 (83.5)	18.9 (66.0)	15.7 (60.3)	39.9 (103.8)
Mean daily maximum °C (°F)	7.0 (44.6)	7.8 (46.0)	10.4 (50.7)	13.4 (56.1)	16.5 (61.7)	19.4 (66.9)	22.1 (71.8)	21.8 (71.2)	18.6 (65.5)	14.3 (57.7)	9.9 (49.8)	7.2 (45.0)	14.1 (57.4)
Daily mean °C (°F)	4.1 (39.4)	4.6 (40.3)	6.5 (43.7)	8.9 (48.0)	11.8 (53.2)	14.8 (58.6)	17.2 (63.0)	17.0 (62.6)	14.3 (57.7)	10.8 (51.4)	6.9 (44.4)	4.4 (39.9)	10.1 (50.2)
Mean daily minimum °C (°F)	1.3 (34.3)	1.3 (34.3)	2.6 (36.7)	4.5 (40.1)	7.2 (45.0)	10.2 (50.4)	12.2 (54.0)	12.2 (54.0)	10.1 (50.2)	7.2 (45.0)	3.9 (39.0)	1.6 (34.9)	6.2 (43.2)
Record low °C (°F)	−15.7 (3.7)	−13.9 (7.0)	−11.1 (12.0)	−4.8 (23.4)	−2.2 (28.0)	0.0 (32.0)	4.5 (40.1)	3.3 (37.9)	−0.6 (30.9)	−4.4 (24.1)	−8.0 (17.6)	−11.2 (11.8)	−15.7 (3.7)
Average precipitation mm (inches)	48.1 (1.89)	38.4 (1.51)	36.3 (1.43)	44.6 (1.76)	48.4 (1.91)	59.8 (2.35)	53.5 (2.11)	59.5 (2.34)	50.5 (1.99)	62.4 (2.46)	56.6 (2.23)	54.6 (2.15)	612.6 (24.12)
Average precipitation days (≥ 1.0 mm)	10.9	9.5	9.3	9.0	8.6	9.4	9.1	9.6	8.7	10.3	11.3	11.0	116.7
Mean monthly sunshine hours	65.1	83.7	124.2	163.0	209.2	191.6	202.2	187.6	151.1	113.6	74.4	65.6	1,631.3
Source 1: Met Office
Source 2: Starlings Roost Weather

== Economy ==
As of 2012, Grantham Hospital was the largest individual employer in the town, while food production was a major sector. Poultry production company Moy Park (formerly Padleys) is at Gonerby Hill Foot; GW Padley bought the site in 1977 from Wolsey, a former garment manufacturer. It acts as a poultry hatchery. Moy Park are owned by Marfrig of São Paulo, with Marfrig's European headquarters at Preston Deanery in Hackleton, Northamptonshire. Aviagen Turkeys also has a poultry hatchery further along the B1174 at Gonerby Moor. Brake Bros Ltd has a depot near the Gonerby Moor service station, off B1174.

Fenland Foods (part of Northern Foods) on the Earlesfield Industrial Estate, closed in September 2008 after losing business with Marks and Spencer, its sole customer. On Ellesmere Business park is Väderstad-Verken UK, its parent company based in Väderstad in Sweden and Tecknit Europe (makers of electromagnetic shielding equipment), owned from 2006 by Parker Hannifin based in Cranford, New Jersey.

At Easton, 7 miles (11 kilometres) south of Grantham, are two large facilities. One is Norbert Dentressangle, which bought Christian Salvesen plc in November 2007 and maintains the frozen storage and distribution operation which has been at the site since the late 1960s. The other is McCain Foods, which purchased Potato and Allied Services (PAS) in 1991, which had run a potato processing factory on the site since the early 1970s; it has since been extended. There was a third large frozen vegetable processing factory owned and operated by Christian Salvesen; it was sold to Pinguin Foods in August 2007, which closed the facility in December 2008.

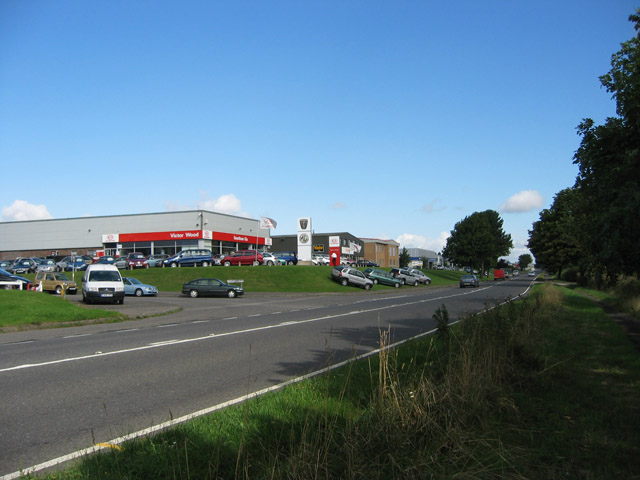
The 46 acres (19 ha) of Spittlegate Level (B1174 – the former A1) south of the town, home of many local companies and the former Corus Service Centre, which was developed in 1973

GBS has been based in Grantham since May 1975, when known as Chatto, Bodley Head & Cape Services. Chatto & Windus had merged with Jonathan Cape in 1969. The former site was officially opened on 23 September 1975 by Michael Foot MP. Random House was formed in 1987 from a combination of book companies, and in 1990 the site became known as Grantham Book Services. The company won an award in 1992 from the British Book Awards. Next door to GBS and a Gala Bingo is Cathodic Protection, which with BGB Innovation won The Queen's Award for Enterprise: International Trade (Export) in 2009.

According to Super Output Area data from the ONS, the least socially deprived area in Lincolnshire is the ward of Stamford St John's; Grantham's least deprived ward is in the north-east of the town near the former Central School.

=== Hotels ===
Conference and hospitality facilities in the Grantham area include the Olde Barn Hotel in Marston, the Q-Hotel group Belton Woods Hotel, the Urban Leisure Hotel and various golf clubs. Stoke Rochford Hall won the Les Routiers Wedding Venue of the Year in 2011. The Griffin Inn at Irnham won the 2012 Les Routiers B&B of the Year Award. The Eden House Hotel is a historic building built as a mansion in about 1850.

==== Angel and Royal inn ====
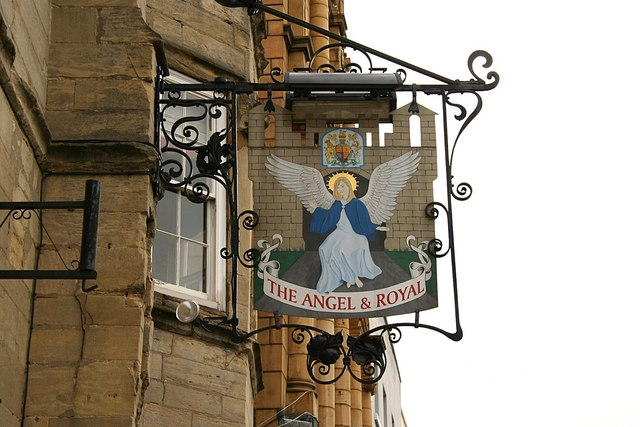
The sign of the Angel and Royal

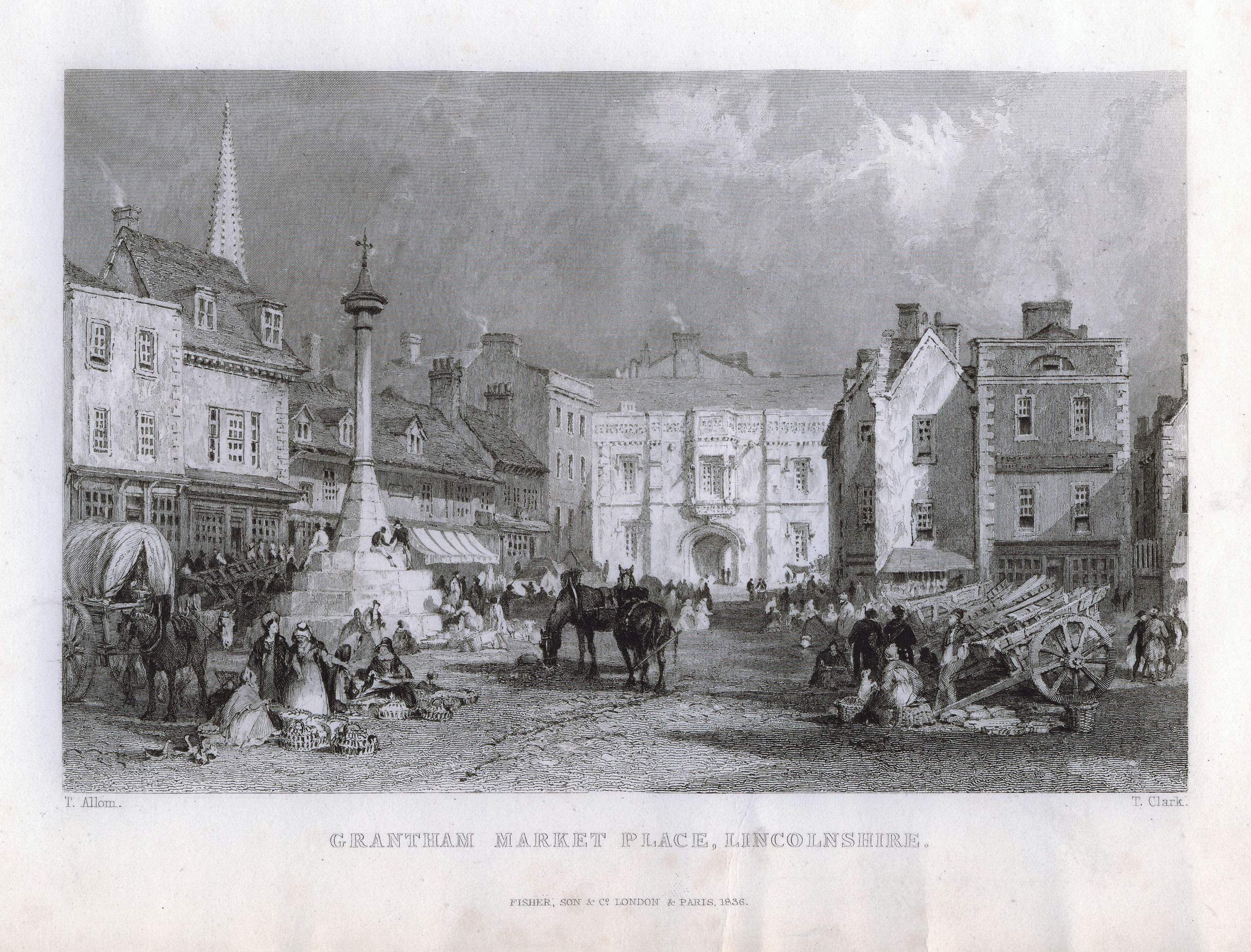
The Angel and Royal in 1836

The Angel and Royal in the High Street is reputedly the oldest inn in England. The present façade was built about 600 years ago, but the site had already held an inn for 200 years before that; its origins are older still, as a hostel for the Knights Templar. King John is reputed to have visited with his Royal Court in 1213. A visit by Richard III was the origin of the gold emblem angel holding the King's crown over the original archway. Other royal visitors include King Charles I, George IV and Edward VII, when Prince of Wales, leading to the inclusion of "Royal" in the inn's name.

=== Closures ===
Brook Street and Hill Avenue sub-post offices were closed in Grantham in 2008, as part of the Post Office Network Change programme. In August 2010, it was confirmed that the Grantham branch of Marks and Spencer would close, with two other Lincolnshire branches in Skegness and Scunthorpe, due to low sales; although a food hall reopened in 2014. The closure met with local protests. Discount department store chain Boyes took over the property in 2012. Haldanes, a chain of about 20 supermarkets based in Ruston Road, went into administration. The former HMRC office at Crown House in Castlegate closed in early 2010, moving to two sites in Lincoln.

== Demography ==
=== Ethnicity and religion ===
According to the 2011 census, Grantham's population (Note: Defined as the ONS E35001363 area – the urban area without Great Gonerby) was 96.3% white; 2.0% Asian or British Asian; 0.6% Black, African, Caribbean or Black British; and 0.9% mixed or multi-ethnic; and 0.2% other.

The population is therefore less ethnically diverse than England as a whole, which is 85.4% white; 7.8% Asian or Asian British; 3.5% Black, African, Caribbean or Black British; 2.3% mixed ethnicities; and 1% other. 90.1% of the town's population were born in the United Kingdom, compared with 86.2% nationally; 6.1% were born in European Union countries other than the UK and Ireland, of which almost three quarters (4.3% of the total) were born in post-2001 accession states; for England, the figures were 3.7% and 2.0% respectively. 3.4% of the population was born outside the EU, whereas the total for England was 9.4%.

In the 2011 census, 69.4% of Grantham's population said they were religious and 23.8% said they did not follow a religion, very similar to England as a whole (68.1% and 24.7% respectively). However, compared to England's population, Christians were a higher proportion of the Grantham population (67.6% compared with 59.4%), and all other groups were present at a lower proportion than the national rates. There were 20 Sikhs in Grantham, making up a negligible proportion of the population compared with 0.8% nationally; Hindus composed 0.5% (compared with 1.5% in England), Muslims 0.5% against 5% nationally, Jewish people 0.1% compared with 0.5% for all of England, and Buddhists 0.3% of the town's population, contrasting with 0.5% nationally.

Ethnicity, nationality and religious affiliation of residents (2011)
	White	Asian or British Asian	Black, African, Caribbean or Black British	Mixed or multi-ethnic	Other ethnicity	Born in UK	Born in EU (except UK and Ireland)	Born outside EU	Religious	Did not follow a religion	Christian	Muslim	Other religions
Grantham	96.3%	2.0%	0.6%	0.9%	0.2%	90.1%	6.1%	3.4%	69.4%	23.8%	67.6%	0.5%	0.9%
England	85.4%	7.8%	3.5%	2.3%	1.0%	86.2%	3.7%	9.4%	68.1%	24.7%	59.4%	5.0%	2.5%

=== Household composition, age, health and housing ===
Gender, age, health and household characteristics (2011)
Characteristics	Grantham	England
Male	48.5%	49.2%
Female	51.5%	50.8%
Married (Note: Residents aged 16 and over)	47.2%	46.6%
Single	31.1%	34.6%
Divorced	10.9%	9.0%
Widowed	7.3%	6.9%
One-person households	28.8%	30.2%
One-family households	65.3%	61.8%
Mean age	39.4	39.3
Median age	39.0	39.0
Population under 20	24.8%	24.0%
Population over 60	22.4%	22.0%
Residents in good health	80.7%	81.4%
Owner-occupiers (Note: Households)	62.2%	63.3%
Private renters	18.8%	16.8%
Social renters	17.1%	17.7%
Living in a detached house	27.8%	22.3%

In the 2011 census, 48.5% of the population were male and 51.5% female. Of the population over 16, 47.2% were married, compared to 46.6% in England; 31.1% were single (a smaller proportion than in England where it was 34.6%), 10.9% divorced (compared with 9% in England), 7.3% widowed (slightly higher than the 6.9% for all of England), 3.3% separated and 0.2% in same-sex civil partnerships (2.7% and 0.2% respectively in England). In 2011, there were 17,944 households in the Grantham urban area. It had a slightly lower than average proportion of one-person households (28.8% compared with England's figure of 30.2%); most other households consisted of one family, which was more common in Grantham than England as a whole (65.3% of the total, compared with 61.8% in England). This was because there were slightly higher than average rates of cohabiting couples (12% compared with 9.8%), lone parent households (11.2% against 10.6%) and married couples (34.2% compared with 33.2%), but fewer people in multiple and other household types (5.9% compared with 8%).

The 2011 census showed the average age of Grantham's population to be in line with the national average; the mean age was 39.3 and the median 39 years, compared with 39.3 and 39 for England. 24.8% of the population was under 20, versus 24% of England's, and 22.4% of Grantham's population was aged over 60, compared with 22% of England's population. In 2011, 80.7% of the population were in good or very good health, compared to 81.4% in England, and 5.4% in very bad or bad health, exactly the same rate as in England. 18% of people (9.3% in 16–64 year-olds) also reported having their day-to-day activities limited, compared with 17.6% in England (8.2% in 16–64 year-olds).

As of 2011, Grantham had similar proportions of people who owned their homes with or without a mortgage (62.2%) than in England (63.3%) and who rented socially (17.1% compared with 17.7% nationally); there was a slightly higher rate of private renting (18.8% compared with 16.8%) while owner-occupiers were more likely to be mortgaged than in England as a whole (55.7% of them, compared with 51.8%). The proportion of household spaces which are detached or semi-detached houses is higher than average (27.8% and 33.6%, compared with 22.3% and 30.7%), while the proportion of households living in apartments, flats and maisonettes is much lower (13.1% against 22.1%). The proportion of terraced household spaces is similar (25.4% compared with 24.5%).

=== Workforce ===
Economic characteristics of residents aged 16 to 74 (2011)
Characteristic	Grantham	England
Economic activity
Economically active	72.7%	69.9%
Employed	69.9%	62.1%
Full-time employed	42.7%	38.6%
Retirees	13.9%	13.7%
Long-term sick or disabled	3.9%	4.0%
Long-term unemployed	1.6%	1.7%

Industry of residents aged 16 to 74 (2011)
Characteristic	Grantham	England
Agriculture	0.9%	0.8%
Manufacturing	13.9%	8.8%
Construction	7.3%	7.7%
Wholesale and retail trade; repair of vehicles	19.1%	15.9%
Transport and storage	5.0%	5.0%
Accommodation and food services	6.0%	5.6%
Information and communication	2.0%	4.1%
Financial and insurance	2.4%	4.4%
Professional, scientific and technical	3.9%	6.7%
Public administration and defence	6.7%	5.9%
Education	7.7%	9.9%
Health and social work	12.9%	12.4%

Occupation of residents aged 16 to 74 (2011)
Characteristic	Grantham	England
Managers and directors	9.3%	10.9%
Professionals; associate professionals	21.8%	30.3%
Administrative and secretarial	10.8%	11.5%
Sales and customer services	9.4%	8.4%
Caring, leisure and other services	10.5%	9.3%
Skilled trades	12.8%	11.4%
Process, plant and machine operatives	10.9%	7.2%
Elementary occupations	14.4%	11.1%
Qualifications
No qualifications	23.7%	22.5%
Level 4 or higher	19.8%	27.4%

In 2011, 72.7% of Grantham's residents aged between 16 and 74 were economically active, compared with 69.9% for all of England. 65.6% were in employment, compared with 62.1% nationally. The proportion in full-time employment is also comparatively high, at 42.7% (against 38.6% for England). The proportion of retirees was in line with the national figure, at 13.9% compared with 13.7% for England, as was the proportion of long-term sick or disabled (3.9%, compared with England's 4%); 1.6% of people were long-term unemployed, compared with 1.7% in all of England. The 2011 census revealed that the most common industry residents worked in were: wholesale and retail trade and repair of motor vehicles (19.1%), manufacturing (13.9%), and human health and social work (12.9%). The latter category was in line with the national average, but retail and manufacturing were overrepresented compared with England (where the proportions were 15.9% and 8.8%, respectively). Most other industries were under-represented comparatively, with financial services (2.4% versus 4.4% nationally), information and communication (2.0% against 4.1% nationally), and professional, scientific and technical activities (3.9% compared with 6.7%) especially so.

Compared with the whole of England, the workforce had modestly higher proportions of people in elementary occupations (14.4% compared with 11.1%), process, plant and machinery operative roles (10.9% against 7.2%), skilled trades (12.8% versus 11.4%), and caring and other service occupations (10.5% against 9.3%). There was a much lower proportion of people in professional, associate professional, technical, administrative and secretarial occupations than in England as a whole (combined 32.6% versus 41.7% of England's population aged 16–74), principally driven by a lower proportion of full professionals (11.1% compared with 17.5%).

The proportion of residents aged 16 to 74 with no qualifications was 23.7%, only slightly higher than the national figure (22.5%); the proportion of residents whose highest qualification is at Level 1 or 2 (equivalent to GCSEs) is higher than in the national population, but 19.8% of Grantham's population have a qualification at Level 4 or above (Certificate of Higher Education upwards, including graduates), compared with 27.4% nationally.

=== Deprivation ===
The government's Indices of Multiple Deprivation (2019) show that Grantham contains both dense pockets of deprivation and areas of substantial affluence. The county council note that high levels of deprivation in parts of the town contrast with the less deprived rural hinterlands around it. A statistical area covering part of the Earlesfield estate falls within the most deprived 10% of areas in the country; it is the most deprived place in South Kesteven. Other parts of Earlesfield and the Cherry Orchard suburb fall within the most deprived 20% of areas nationally, while much of the central urban area also falls below the national median and the top five most deprived areas in the district are all parts of Grantham. However, the Green Hill and Spinney housing estates and parts of Gonerby Hill Foot and Manthorpe fall within the least deprived decile nationally; one of them is in the least 10 deprived places in South Kesteven.

== Transport ==
=== Railway ===
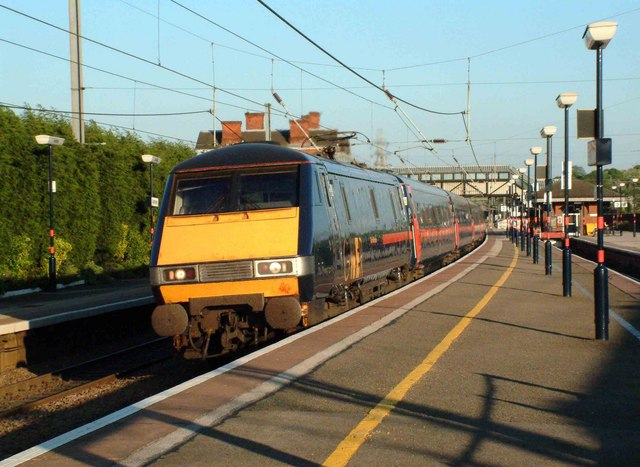
A Class 91 electric locomotive hauls a northbound GNER inter-city service (May 2004)

Grantham railway station lies on three lines:

- East Coast Main Line, which connects London with Edinburgh
- Nottingham-Grantham Line
- Poacher Line, between Grantham and Skegness.

The station is served by three train operating companies:

- London North Eastern Railway operates services to London Kings Cross, Leeds, Newcastle, Edinburgh Waverley and Lincoln
- Hull Trains provides services on the route between London Kings Cross and Hull Paragon
- East Midlands Railway operates services to Sheffield, Manchester Piccadilly, Liverpool Lime Street, Ely, Norwich, Nottingham, Sleaford and Skegness.

On 3 July 1938, Mallard broke the world speed record for steam locomotives, at 126 mph (203 km/h), on the slight downward grade of Stoke Bank south of Grantham on the East Coast Main Line.

=== Road ===
The Great North Road was routed through the town in 1196. The turnpike to the north reached the town in 1725, Stamford in 1739, Nottingham in 1758 and Melton Mowbray in 1780.

The A1 main road from London to Edinburgh runs past the town, which was bypassed in 1962. The A52, linking Nottingham and the East Coast, was diverted from High Street onto the Inner Relief Road, Sankt Augustin Way, in 1998. Wharf Road and London Road junction is still a busy junction on the A607 for Lincoln. Motorway-style Grantham North Services, at the north end of Grantham bypass, is on a new junction which replaced a roundabout in May 2008.

Grantham, with Stamford, had been earmarked for a bypass before the war in 1939. There were 60 serious accidents a year, with three to four deaths. After the Second World War, on 21 November 1945, there was a meeting at the Guildhall about the proposed bypass of the London-Edinburgh-Thurso trunk road for Grantham and Great Gonerby. This was the first enquiry into a trunk road scheme in the country after the war. The proposed route followed the current line, from Little Ponton to College Farm, except it was to be a single carriageway road.

On 8 February 1960, it was announced that a bypass would be built, including the route south to the B6403 at Colsterworth. Robert McGregor and Sons Ltd of Manchester would build the road for £1,856,009; the company went on to build Newark bypass in 1964. The bridges were built by Simon Carves of Cheadle Hulme. It was formally opened on 10 October 1962 by James Heathcote-Drummond-Willoughby, 3rd Earl of Ancaster, then the Lord Lieutenant of Lincolnshire (from 1950 to 1975). He was married to the only daughter of Nancy Astor.

Several attempts at one-way systems in Grantham have been introduced, but traffic delays are still commonplace. Low railway bridges also add to traffic difficulties, with lorries becoming stuck under them. Many promises have been made by the local council for a Grantham bypass. The latest, the Grantham Southern Relief Road, has been in planning since 2007. Phase one of the project was completed in 2016 which provided access to some commercial facilitates and a new roundabout on the B1174. Phase Two, which started in October 2019, involves a new grade separated junction on the A1 and is due to be opened on 20 December 2022. Phase three for the main stretch of road started in 2021 and due to be completed by 2023. In July 2022, it was found that ground conditions at a new viaduct were for as expected, and the project would be delayed as the viaduct would need to be redesigned.

=== Waterways ===
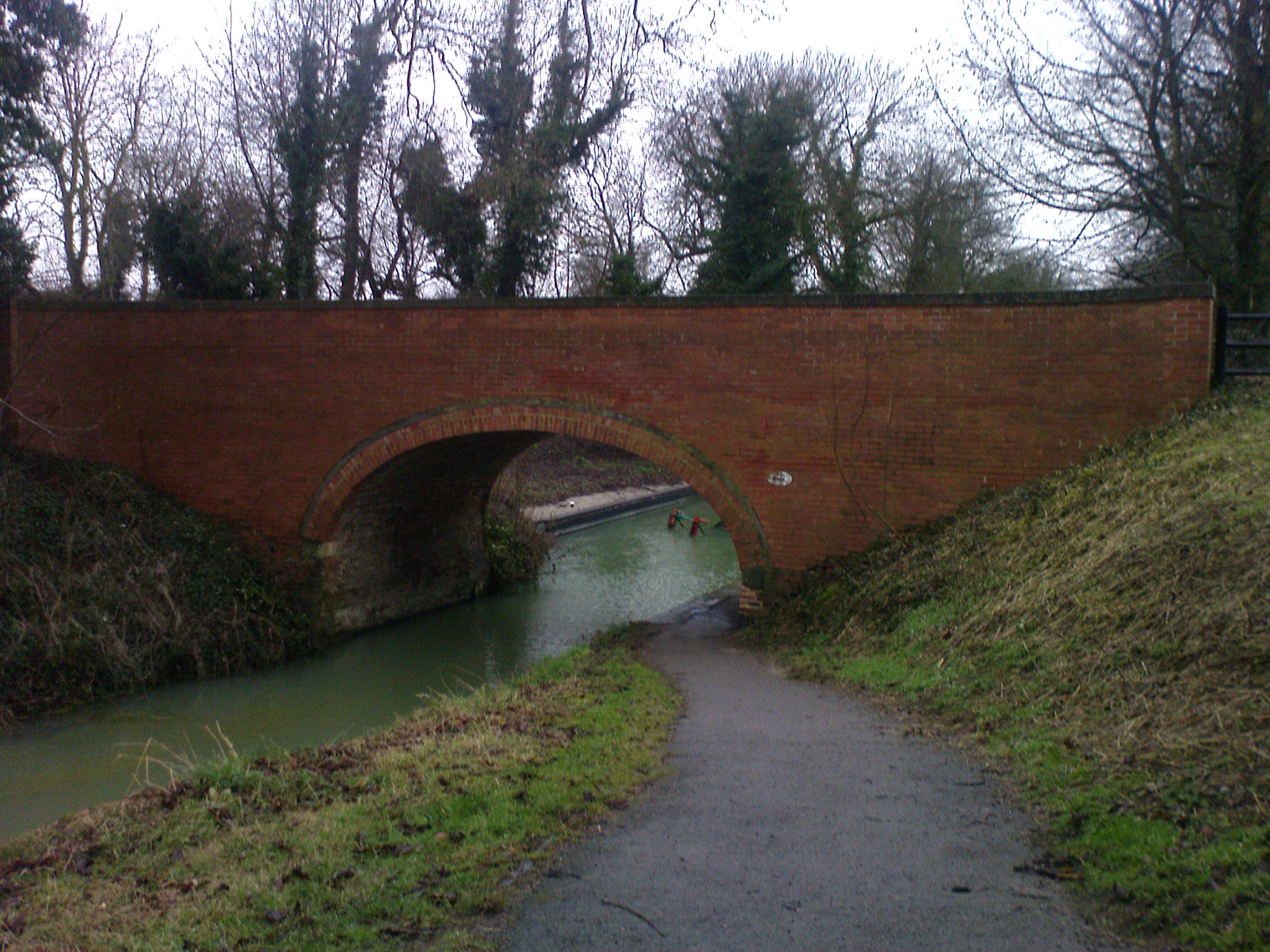
Bridge 66 on the Grantham Canal at Harlaxton

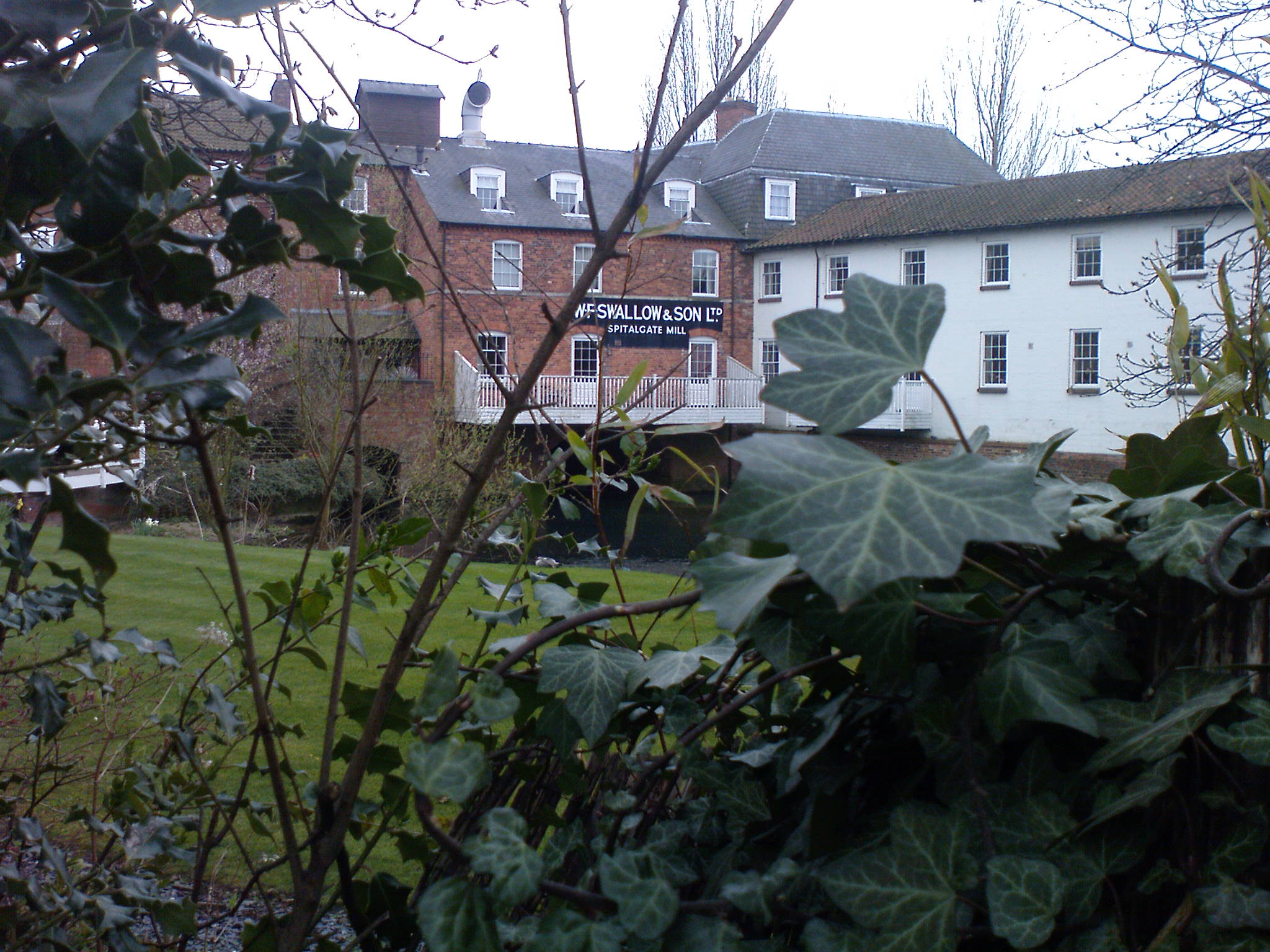
Spittlegate Millhouse

Grantham was once linked to Nottingham by the Grantham Canal. It is possible to walk and cycle along the canal starting from Grantham near the A1/A607 intersection (opposite The Farrier public house).

The River Witham runs through Grantham. It has a riverside walk linking Dysart Park and Wyndham Park, on which is a view of Spittlegate Mill. The walk passes Inner Street allotment and the rear of Sainsbury's car park; access to which is by a pedestrian bridge at the end of College Street. There are other footbridges with views of the river and its weirs.

== Education ==
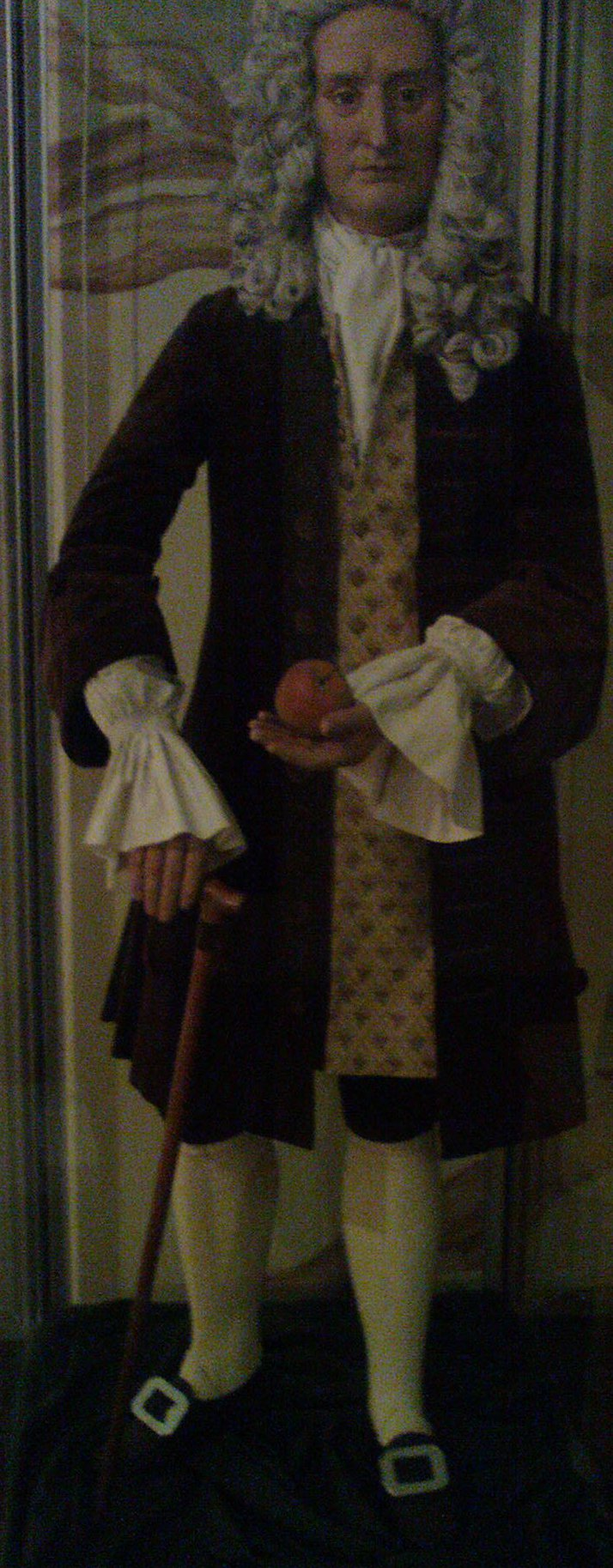
Mannequin of Isaac Newton at Grantham Museum

Grantham College, a further education college for the district, opened in 1948, for those not attending school sixth forms. It has a satellite site at Sleaford College. Since September 2008, the Walton Academy in Kitty Briggs Lane near Harlaxton Road has run post-16 courses. In September 2019, the school had its first intake of male students in the lower school, making the former all-girls school co-educational.

Two notable schools in the district are Kesteven and Grantham Girls' School and The King's School. Both have large sixth forms and eminent past students. The UK's first female prime minister, Margaret Thatcher, attended Kesteven and Grantham, and Isaac Newton famously attended King's. Both have remained single-sex up to the age of 16.

In 1970, Kesteven County Council (based in Sleaford) announced plans to turn the grammar schools into co-educational comprehensives for ages of 11–16 and leave Grantham College the only sixth form for the town. Later, it was proposed to create two sixth-form colleges from one of the grammar schools. Other parts of Kesteven became comprehensive, but responsibility for education passed to Lincolnshire under the local government reorganisation of 1974; both schools stayed as grammar schools. Ex-pupil Margaret Thatcher was education secretary at the time. The governors of the King's School delayed the process in July 1973 and, in January 1975, a plan to make Grantham comprehensive was voted against by the county council, having been approved by the council's own education committee.

On 1 August 2011, The King's School ended its long relationship with the local elected authorities and the town of Grantham, by converting to a selective academy. It remains a selective boys' school and has kept its name and logo.

All four secondary modern schools are on the outskirts of Grantham. Only three of the six secondary schools are co-educational.

The Priory Ruskin Academy (formerly Central Technology & Sports College) is a co-educational school sited near Manthorpe; this school is part of the wider Priory Federation, which has multiple schools in Lincolnshire and Leicestershire. The Priory Ruskin Academy has a sixth form, which opened in 2013 at the old Church High School site.

In Gorse Lane is Grantham Preparatory School, an independent school preparing entrants for the eleven-plus. Another private primary school is Dudley House School. Near St Wulfram's, on Castlegate, is the National Church of England Junior School, built in 1859, and a feeder school for the town's grammar schools.

The Blessed Hugh More School, a Catholic secondary school, closed in 1989.

== Governance ==
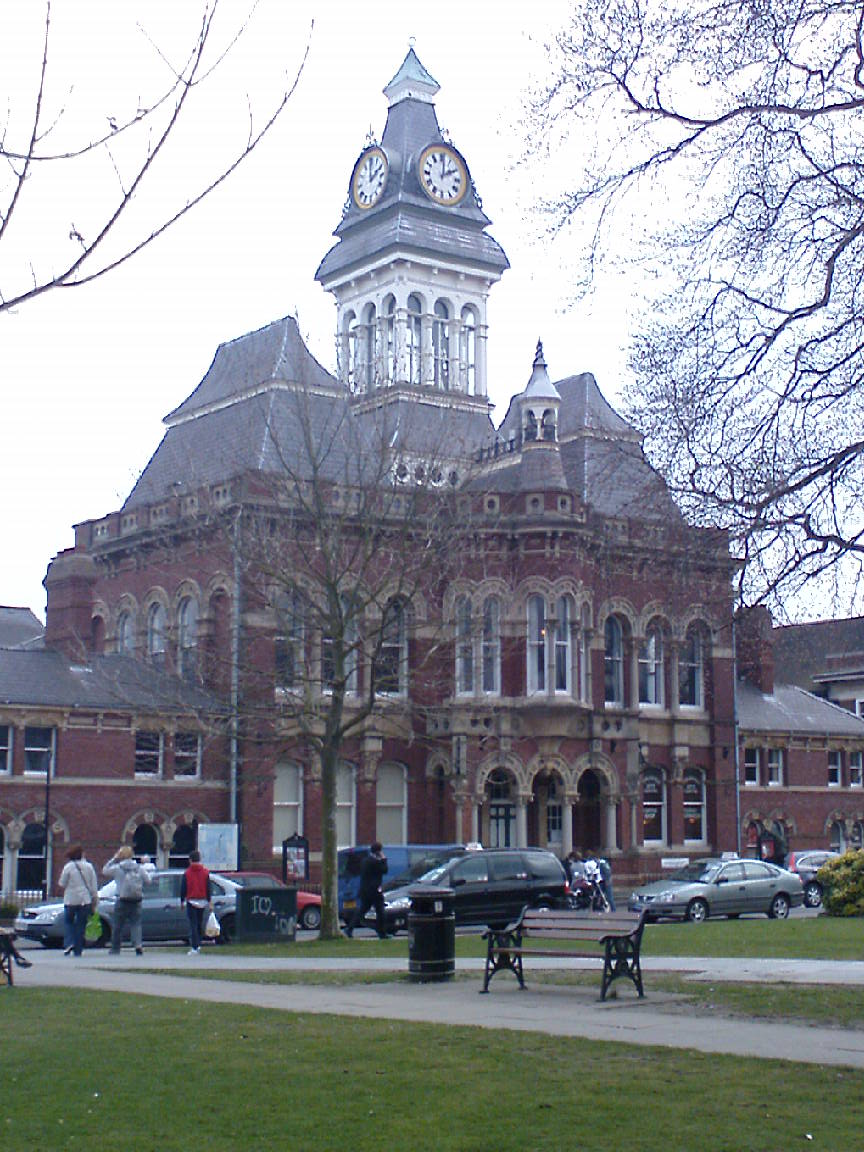
Grantham Guildhall, completed in 1869

Grantham once lay within the ancient Winnibriggs and Threo wapentake in the Soke of Grantham.

the unparished area in South Kesteven district, the current parish and previous district have the same boundaries as the former unparished area

In 1894, Grantham became a municipal borough which became part of the administrative county of the Parts of Kesteven in 1889. Grantham Borough Council was based at Grantham Guildhall on St Peters Hill, while West Kesteven Rural District (covering the town's hinterland) was based in Sandon Close. On 1 April 1974 the borough, rural district and administrative county were abolished, and Grantham became part of South Kesteven non-metropolitan district in the non-metropolitan county of Lincolnshire. No successor parish was formed so it became unparished. Charter trustees, consisting of district councillors elected for the town's wards, took responsibility for ceremonial functions remaining from the former borough council. A charter trustees was formed to preserve the borough status of the former borough.

On 1 April 2024, Grantham was parished and the responsibilities of the charter trustees were transferred to the parish. The parish council is named Grantham Town Council and is made up of 22 councillors representing seven wards: Arnoldfield, Barrowby Gate, Earlesfield, Harrowby, Springfield, St Vincent's and St Wulfram's. Each elects three councillors, except St Vincent's which elects four. These wards are similar to, but not identical with, the district wards used for election to South Kesteven District Council.

For elections to Parliament, the town is in the Grantham and Bourne constituency, represented by the Conservative Party MP Gareth Davies, who was elected at the 4 July 2024 general election.

Two of Grantham's MPs in recent years, Joe Godber and Douglas Hogg, have been Secretary of State for Agriculture.

The 2016 population, put at 44,580, divides by electoral ward into Belmont 4,900; Grantham Arnoldfield 4,666, Grantham Barrowby Gate 5,195, Grantham Earlsfield 6,557, Grantham Harrowby 4,770, Grantham St Vincent's 7,637, Grantham St Wulfram's 5,461, and Grantham Springfield 5,394.

== Religious sites ==
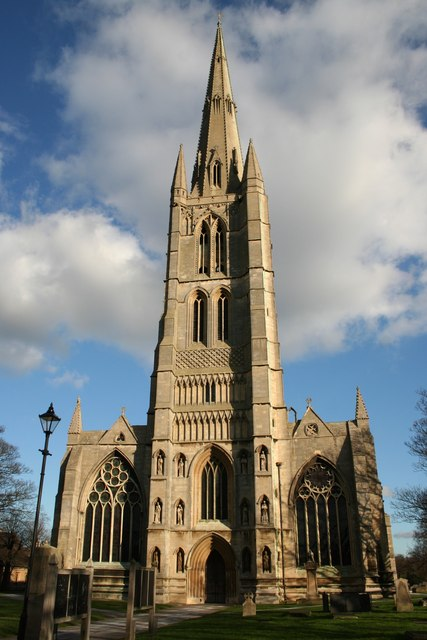
St Wulfram's Church

Grantham has places of worship of various denominations. The main local landmark is the parish church of St Wulfram's, which has the sixth highest spire among English churches, at 282 1/2 feet (86.1 metres). It is the second tallest church in Lincolnshire, after St James' Church in Louth. It also holds England's first public library, dating from 1598, when Francis Trigge, rector of Welbourn, gave £100 for a small chained library of books for the clergy and literate laity of Grantham; 250 of the original volumes remain in a small room above the South Porch. From October 1974, the church was permanently floodlit at night.

The Anglican church in the New Somerby district, dedicated to St Anne and seating about 350, was erected as a mission church in 1884 and built of iron. A mission church, dedicated to St Saviour and seating about 150, was built of brick in the Little Gonerby district in 1884. The church of St John the Evangelist was built of stone in the Spittlegate district in 1840–1841. It seated about 1,100. Today the Deanery of Grantham still includes the churches of St Anne and St John the Evangelist amongst its 18 churches. The current suffragan Bishop of Grantham is Nicholas Chamberlain; his official residence is in Long Bennington.

The Catholic Church of St Mary the Immaculate stands in North Parade. Grantham Baptist Church is located in Wharf Road. Grantham Christchurch (LEP) Church (United Reformed Church) is located in Finkin Street. Harrowby Lane Methodist Church dates from the late 1920s. Finkin Street Methodist Church was a Wesleyan Methodist chapel built in the 1840s and attended by Margaret Thatcher.

Plans in 2014 to construct an Islamic cultural centre in the town created controversy, including protests from right-wing groups.

== Culture and amenities ==
=== Amenities ===
Wyndham Park has two children's play areas. There is an open-air paddling pool, football pitch and cafe. Dysart Park has a paddling pool and safe play area for children under six, a green for football and a bandstand. Indoor amenities for children include a swimming pool at the Meres Leisure Centre.

The public library is located in the Sir Isaac Newton Centre. On St Peter's Hill in the centre of town stands Grantham Museum and the Guildhall Arts Centre, which includes a 210-seat theatre.

Belton House is a popular National Trust site, with events for children, a play area, train rides, picnic area and woodland walk.

=== Nature ===
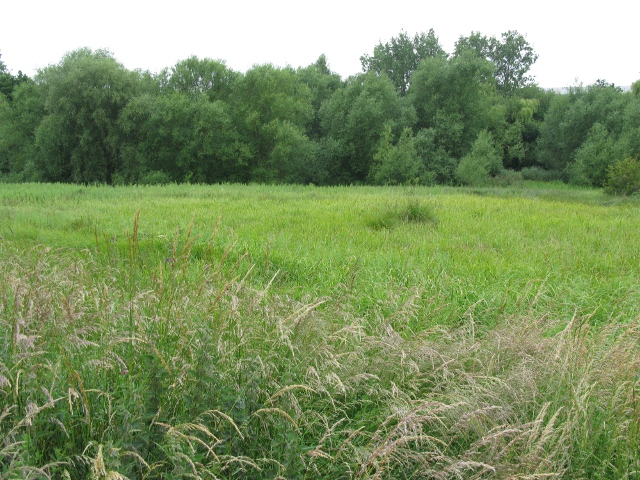
Saltersford Marsh

Grantham and its surrounding area host peregrine falcons, which have in recent years roosted in the bell tower of St Wulfram's Church. Grantham is surrounded by rolling countryside and woodland, such as nearby Ponton Park Wood, which has walks and views of woods and farmland. To the north-east there are the attractive gardens and the magnificent deer park of the National Trust's Belton House. Adjacent are Londonthorpe and Alma Park Woods, both owned by the Woodland Trust. The former comprises young woodland and open areas of wild flowers, while Alma Park has mature woodland on its steep limestone scarp and offers views over the town and the surrounding area.

To the south of the town, between Little Ponton and Saltersford, the River Witham flows through marshes and water meadows that support a variety of plant species, including vetches, cowslip, Primula veris, Lady's bedstraw Galium verum, and orchids, including the southern marsh orchid, and wildlife, including grey herons, mallards, greylag geese, water vole, and the now critically endangered white clawed crayfish. The area has notable populations of dragonflies, especially Aeshna grandis, Anax imperator, Libellula quadrimaculata and Calopteryx splendens, which are also found on Grantham Canal as it runs through The Vale of Belvoir to the west of the town. Wildlife can also be found in the town's Wyndham and Dysart Parks.

The Woodland Trust is based in Dysart Road and has been in Grantham since 1978; its new £6 million building, on the opposite side of the road, opened in November 2010. The building, designed by Atelier One and Max Fordham, has won several architectural awards.

=== Gingerbread biscuits ===
The town is known for gingerbread biscuits, first made in 1740 by a baker, William Eggleston. He produced a biscuit called Grantham Whetstones. Whetstones were a rusk-like dry biscuit enjoyed locally and by coach drivers who would stop in Grantham to change horses while travelling along the Great North Road. According to folk belief, Egglestone was baking whetstones in his dimly lit kitchen one morning when he mistook one ingredient for another, resulting in a ginger-like biscuit to emerge from the oven. The mistake was a huge success and the biscuit became established as Grantham Gingerbread, known as a white gingerbread, as it is not made with molasses or black treacle. This has a delicate ginger flavour, rich in butter, with a domed top and a crackled surface. The centre is hollow like a honeycomb.

=== Media ===
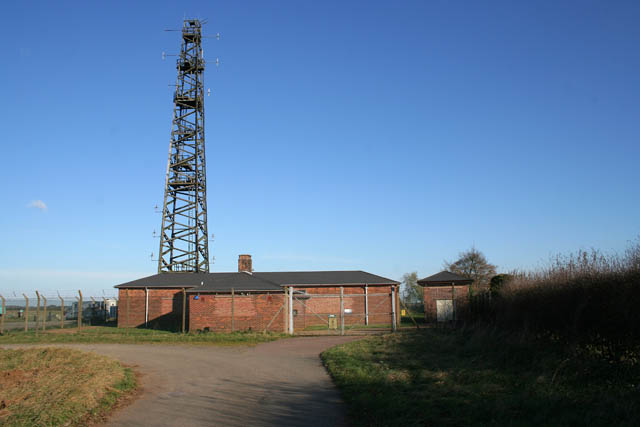
Grantham Radio Station, owned by NATS (En Route) Limited, for radio navigation for aircraft, and is situated in the north of Waltham near the Sproxton parish boundary

Grantham's local newspaper, the Grantham Journal, first went on sale in 1854 as The Grantham Journal of Useful, Instructive and Entertaining Knowledge and Monthly Advertiser. It was founded by Henry Escritt, a Yorkshireman by birth, who moved to the area in 1861. The Journal is owned by Iliffe Media (formerly by Johnston Press), and has a sister newspaper in Melton Mowbray, the Melton Times. In the 1960s and earlier, it produced the Melton Journal and Rutland Journal, both versions of the main paper.

David Wood (1914–1990), former political editor of The Times (working under Sir William Haley), started out at the Grantham Journal.

Local news and television programmes are provided by BBC East Midlands and BBC Yorkshire and Lincolnshire on BBC One, and by ITV Central and ITV Yorkshire on ITV1.

Radio stations that broadcast to the town are BBC Radio Lincolnshire and Greatest Hits Radio Lincolnshire. Grantham also has a full-time community radio station, Gravity FM. The station has its own studios in Riverside Walk, on the western side of Grantham College. It is operated by local volunteers.

== Sport ==
=== Football ===
Grantham Town Football Club currently plays in the Northern Premier League. It was founded in 1874 and now uses the 7,500-capacity (covered 1,950, seats 750) South Kesteven Sports Stadium, although average attendances are well below that. The ground also doubles up as the town's athletics stadium (one of only three in Lincolnshire), next to the Grantham Meres Leisure Centre on Trent Road.

Harrowby United F.C. play at Dickens Road. They are in the United Counties League Premier Division North.

=== Rugby union ===
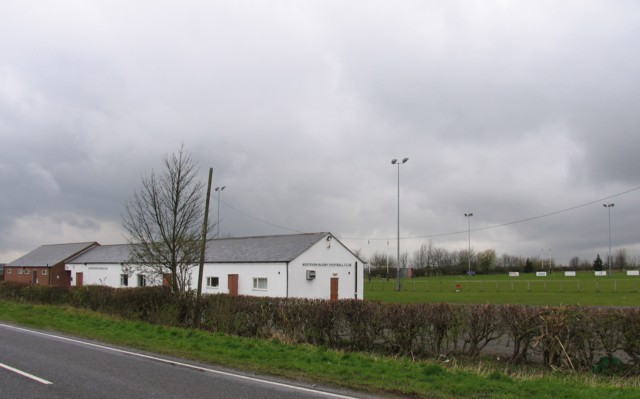
Kesteven RFC pitch (April 2006)

Kesteven Rugby Football Club was founded in 1947 and plays at Woodnook, off the B6403. It fields two men's teams, a ladies' XV and many junior sides.

=== Hockey ===
Grantham Hockey Club, which fielded men's and women's team in league hockey, played at the Meres Leisure Centre, on an astro-turf pitch directly behind the football stadium. In 2011, the men ended a long spell in the Midlands League, moving to the East League, successfully earning promotion to Division 5 (North West). Their story is documented in 1,309 Days Later; the title is a reference to a no-win spell between 2006 and 2009.

=== Bowls ===
Grantham bowls players have represented the indoor and outdoor clubs in county and national competitions. Indoor club players, Martin Pulling, Dion Auckland, Ian Johnson and former England U25 player Mathew Orrey, have played for the England squad.

=== Table tennis ===
In 1993 and 1994, international team matches were held in Grantham, at the South Kesteven Table Tennis Centre, which was opened in January 1992 by Johnny Leach. Grantham College has a Table Tennis Academy.

== Landmarks ==
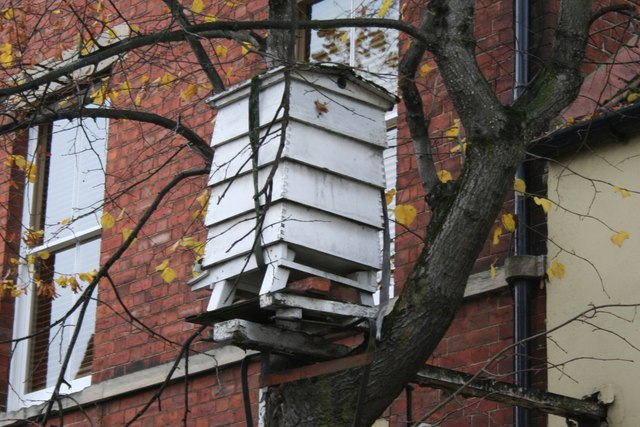
The living pub sign of The Beehive, at 10 Castlegate

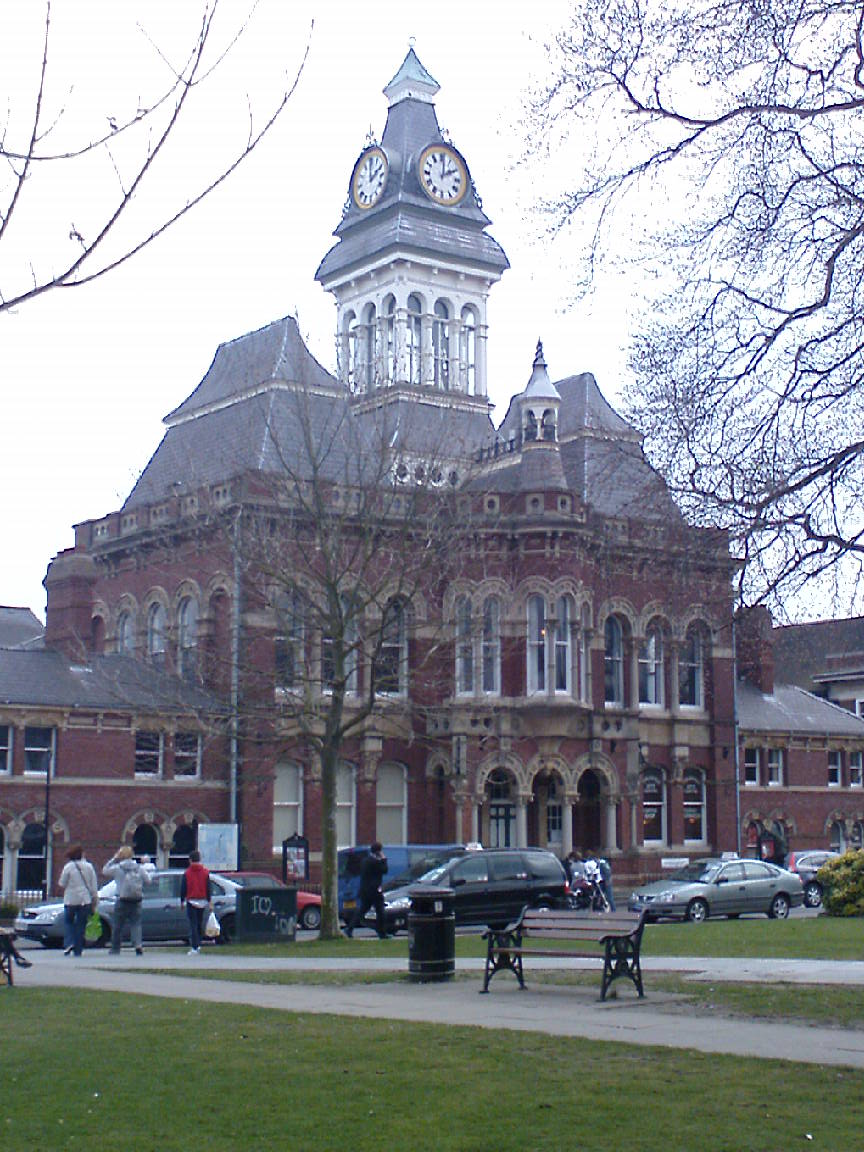
Grantham Guildhall on St Peters Hill, designed by William Watkin

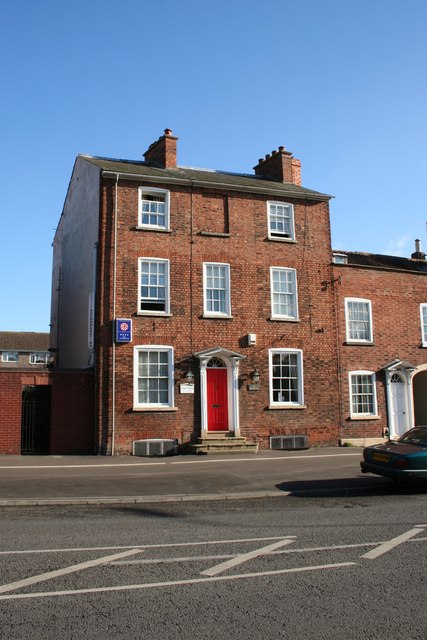
The Red House on North Parade (former Oddfellows Arms)

Grantham House is to the east of the church and is a National Trust property.

Grantham has the country's only "living" public house sign: a beehive of South African bees situated outside the Beehive Inn since 1830.

Grantham Guildhall on St Peter's Hill is now the Guildhall Arts Centre. Edith Smith Way is a road next to the Arts Centre, named after England's first policewoman. Mary Allen and Ellen F. Harburn reported for duty on 27 November 1914. Mary Allen was a former suffragette and had been previously arrested outside the House of Commons and later went on to be the commandant of the UK's women's police force from the 1920s up to 1940. She helped to set up women's police forces in other countries, including Germany. Edith Smith became the first female with powers of arrest in August 1915.

Sandon Road is named after Viscount Sandon, also the Earl of Harrowby. The first person with the title was Dudley Ryder, 1st Earl of Harrowby; a road is also named after him. He bought Harrowby Hall in 1754. The current owner is Dudley Ryder, 8th Earl of Harrowby.

The Blue Pig stands in Vine Street, near the Church of St Wulfram. The building is one of probably only four remaining Tudor buildings in the town and a survivor of the disastrous fires of the 1660s. It was first mentioned as an inn in a trade directory of 1846, when the landlord was one Richard Summersby. The property was then owned by the Manners family (giving the derivation of Blue in the name).

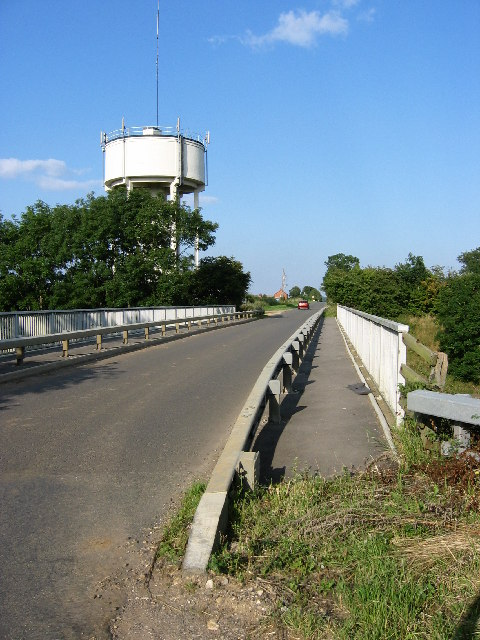
The water tower on Gorse Lane is a local landmark for drivers

The nearby George Hotel (known as St Peter's Place, now the George Shopping Centre) was mentioned in Charles Dickens's novel Nicholas Nickleby. Many of the town's property and industrial estates have been owned by Buckminster Trust Estates since the time of the Earl of Dysart.

To the west of the town near the A607 is Baird's maltings, owned by Moray Firth until 1999 and by R. & W. Paul before that. Other maltings have been converted for residential use, such as Riverview Maltings near the river, formerly owned by Lee & Grinling's.

Grantham JobCentre was opened on 24 June 1975 by local MP Joseph Godber. Grantham and District Hospital stands next to the Priory Ruskin Academy on the A607 in the north of the town. The maternity unit opened in August 1972 is now a midwife-staffed unit.

Nearby are many historic houses including 17th-century Belton House (the Brownlows), early 19th-century Harlaxton Manor (the Gregorys), Stoke Rochford Hall (owned by the Turnors and a training centre of the National Union of Teachers since 1978), and the 19th-century Belvoir Castle (the Manners), in Leicestershire. Much of the property and land to the south-west of the area is owned by the two estates of Belvoir and Buckminster. Further to the south of Stoke Rochford are the Cholmeleys of Easton Hall.

On 15 May 2022, a 10-foot-6-inch (3.2 m) high bronze statue of Margaret Thatcher, dressed in the full ceremonial robes of the House of Lords, by sculptor Douglas Jennings and costing £300,000, was installed. Located on St Peter's Hill Green, close to the Grantham Museum, it was placed on a 10-foot-6-inch (3.2 m) tall plinth to discourage vandalism, but was attacked with eggs within two hours of its unveiling. It has since been vandalised on four further occasions.

== Twinning ==
- Sankt Augustin, North Rhine-Westphalia, Germany (near Bonn, 57,000 population), twinned since 1980. The A52 relief road is named Sankt Augustin Way. Sankt Augustin has its Grantham-Allee and "Grantham-Bridge".

== Notable people ==
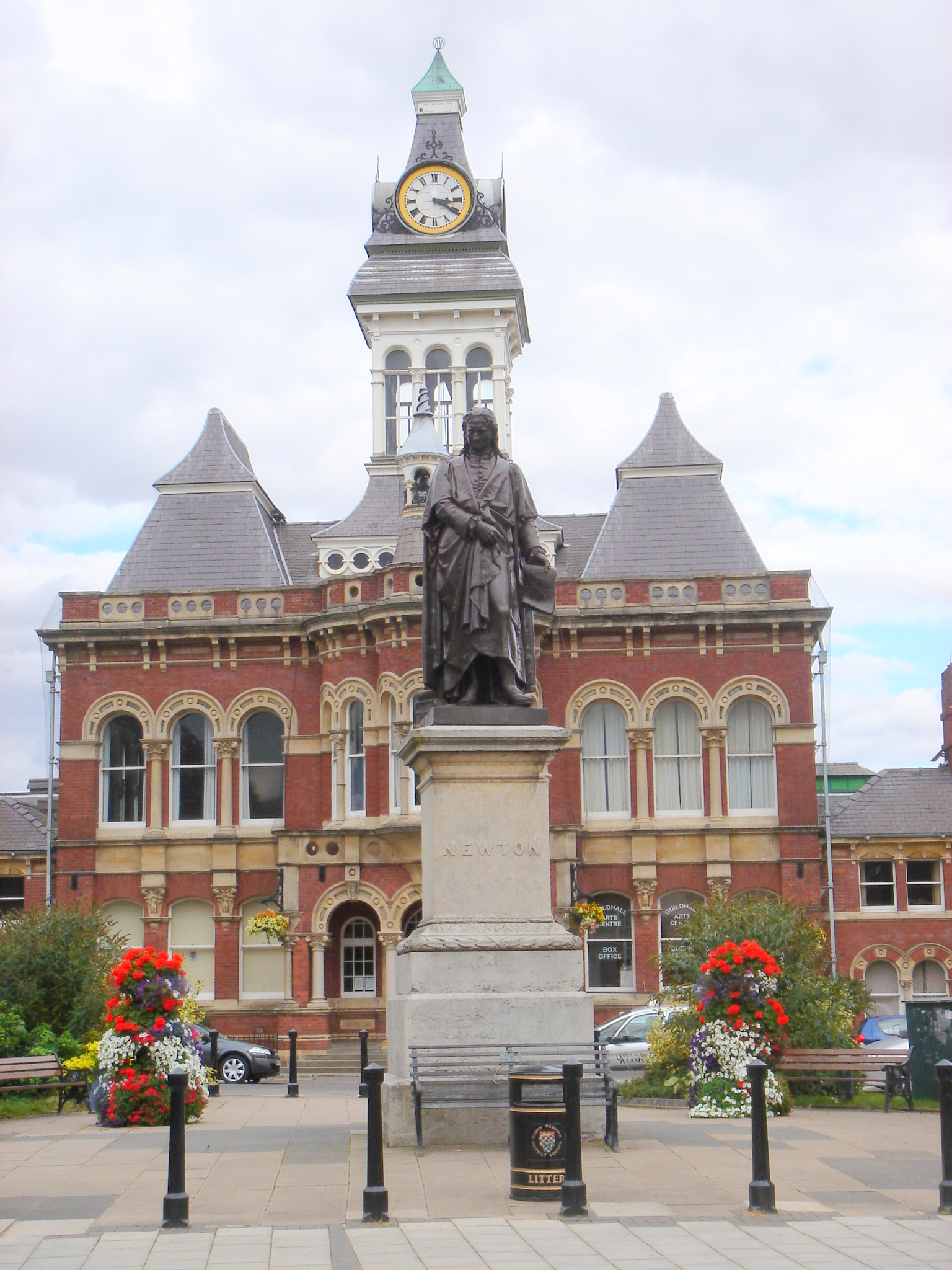
Sir Isaac Newton by William Theed, 1858, bronze; St Peter's Hill, Grantham

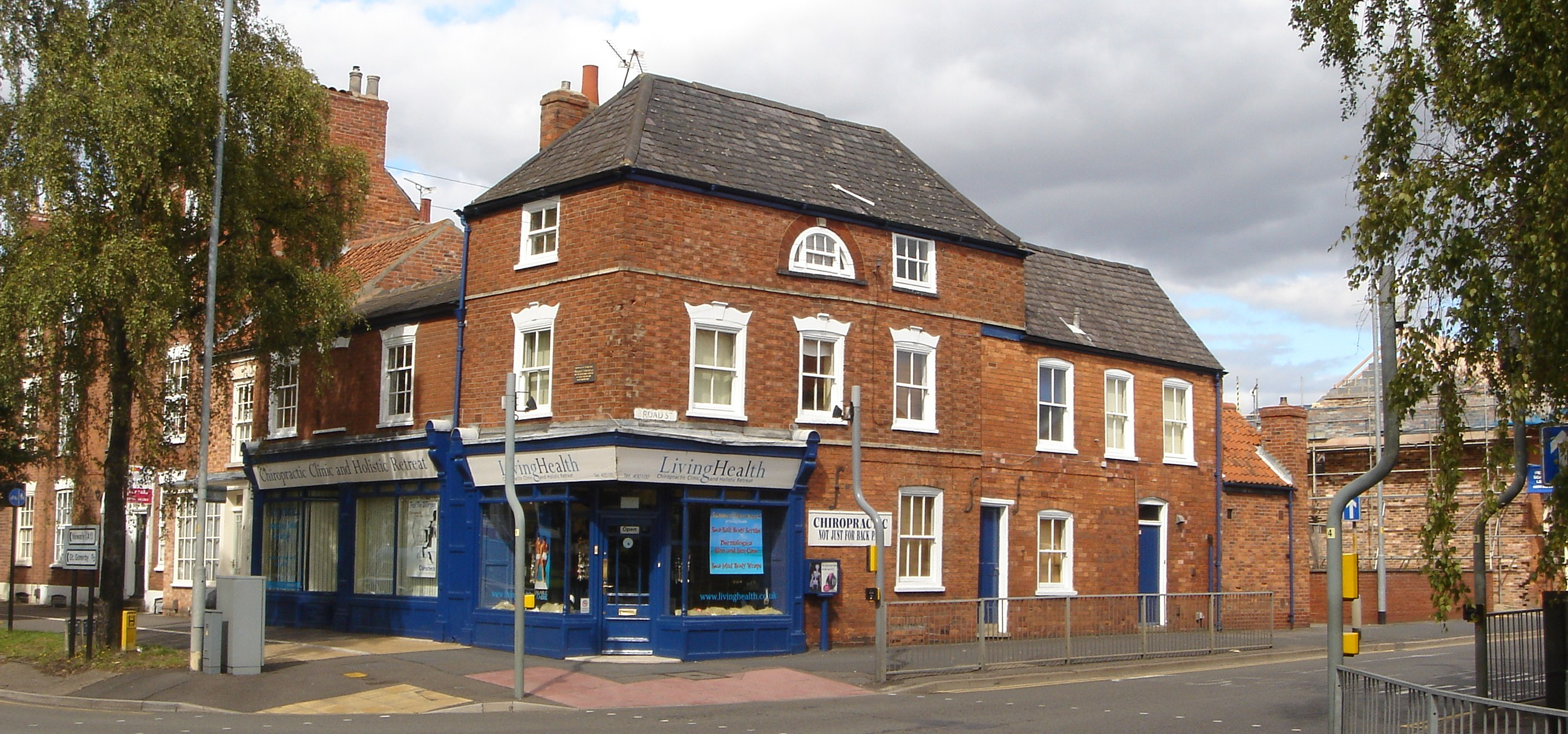
The corner shop where Margaret Thatcher was born, North Parade

=== Armed forces and police ===
- Philip Knights, Baron Knights (1920–2014), police officer
- Walter Richard Parker VC (1881–1936), Royal Marine awarded the Victoria Cross at Gallipoli
- Edith Smith (1876–1924), first woman police officer with full arrest powers

=== Arts and entertainment ===
- Antonio Berardi (born 1968), fashion designer
- Judy Campbell (1916–2004), actor and playwright
- Syd Cain (1918–2011), film production designer
- Eric Chappell (1933–2022), comedy writer
- Colley Cibber (1671–1757), actor, playwright and poet laureate, attended The King's School, Grantham.
- Dorothy Cowlin (1911–2010), novelist
- Johnny Haddon Downes (1920–2004), television producer
- Vince Eager (born 1940), singer
- Graham Fellows (born 1959), actor and musician
- Michael Garner (born 1954), actor
- Holly Humberstone (born 1999), singer and songwriter
- Henry Johnson (1806–1910), circus equestrian gymnast and acrobat
- Jessie Lipscomb (1861–1962), sculptor
- Spencer Matthews (born 1988), television personality and entrepreneur
- Nicholas Maw (1935–2009), composer
- Richard Nauyokas (born 1962), soldier and actor
- Nicholas Parsons (1923–2020), television and radio presenter
- Roy Petley (born 1951), Grantham-born plein air painter
- William Stukeley (1687–1765), antiquarian
- Richard Todd (1919–2009), actor
- Clare Tomlinson (born 1968), news presenter
- Jason Williamson (born 1970), musician, founder and lead singer of Sleaford Mods

=== Crime ===
- Beverley Allitt (born 1968), serial killer
- Julie Pacey (1955/1956–1994), victim of mysterious unsolved murder in the town in 1994. The killer, 'Overalls Man', may also be from the area or still lives there today.

=== Politics and philosophy ===
Statue of Margaret Thatcher in Grantham

- Mary Sophia Allen (1878–1964), suffragist, women's rights activist and Nazi sympathiser
- Sir John Brownlow, 3rd Baronet (1659–1697), politician and landowner
- William Bury (c. 1605–1669), Commonwealth politician and army officer
- William Cecil, 1st Baron Burghley (1520–1598), statesman and Secretary of State, attended the King's School
- Sir Clement Cotterell (1585–1631), courtier and MP for Grantham
- Sir John Cust (1718–1770), MP for Grantham (1743–1770) and Speaker of the House of Commons
- Joseph Godber, Lord Godber (1914–1980), Conservative MP for Grantham (1951–1979) and held several government posts
- Douglas Hogg, Lord Hailsham (born 1945), Conservative politician and minister, MP for Grantham (1979–1997)
- Denis Kendall, MP for Grantham 1942–1950
- John Mordaunt (died c. 1505), MP for Grantham in 1491 and Speaker of the House of Commons
- Henry More (1614–1687), rationalist philosopher, attended The King's School
- Thomas Paine (1737–1809), political writer and revolutionary
- Margot Parker (born 1943), UKIP MEP (2014–2019)
- Sir Arthur Priestley (1865–1933), Liberal MP for Grantham (1900–1918)
- Alderman Alfred Roberts (1892–1970), local politician
- Nathaniel Ryder, 1st Baron Harrowby (1735–1803), politician
- Norman Shrapnel (1912–2004), political correspondent and author
- Margaret Thatcher (1925–2013), Conservative prime minister, daughter of Alfred Roberts
- Thomas Witham (c. 1420–1489), Chancellor of the Exchequer to Henry VI and Edward IV

=== Religion ===
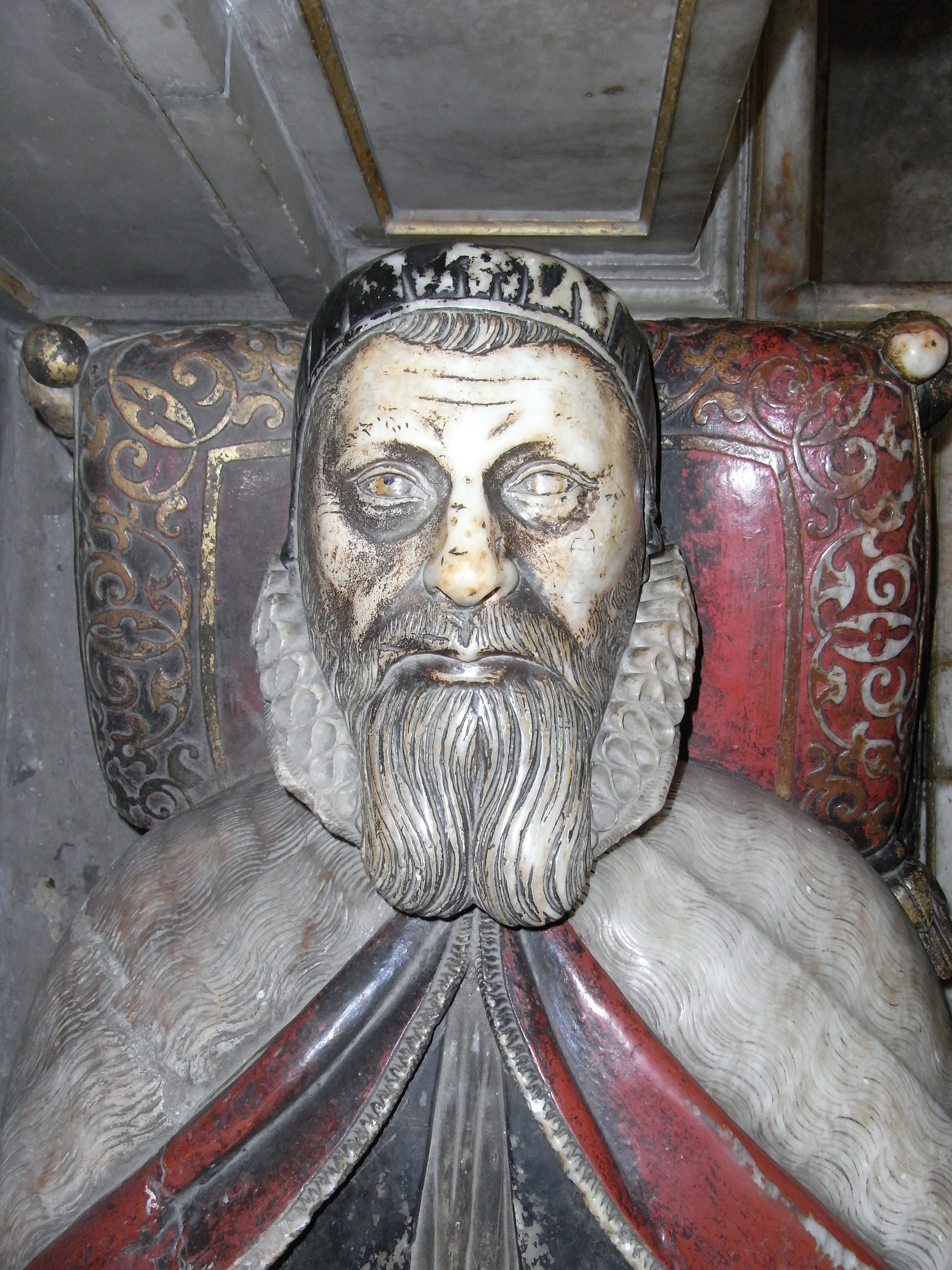
Bishop John Still, effigy in Wells Cathedral

- Frederic Barker (1808–1882), Anglican Bishop of Sydney, attended The King's School
- Tim Ellis (born 1953), Anglican suffragan Bishop of Grantham (2006–2013)
- Arthur Greaves (1873–1960), Anglican suffragan Bishop of Grantham and later Grimsby
- Gregory Hascard (died 1708), Anglican Dean of Windsor and religious writer
- Dennis Hawker (1921–2003), Anglican suffragan Bishop of Grantham (1972–1987)
- John Hine (1857–1934), Anglican bishop, successively of Nyasaland, Zanzibar, Northern Rhodesia and Grantham (1920–1930)
- Welbore MacCarthy (1840–1925), Anglican Archdeacon of Calcutta, and later inaugural suffragan Bishop of Grantham (1905–1920)
- Algernon Markham (1869–1949), Anglican suffragan Bishop of Grantham (1937–1949)
- James McCann (1897–1983), Anglican Archbishop of Armagh and Primate of All Ireland
- Anthony Otter (1896–1986), Anglican suffragan Bishop of Grantham (1949–1965)
- John Still (1593–1608), Bishop of Bath and Wells, once thought to have written an early farce, Gammer Gurton's Needle
- Doris Stokes (1920–1987), spiritualist and psychic medium
- William Wand (1885–1977), Anglican prelate, successively Archbishop of Brisbane, Bishop of Bath and Wells and Bishop of London

=== Science and engineering ===
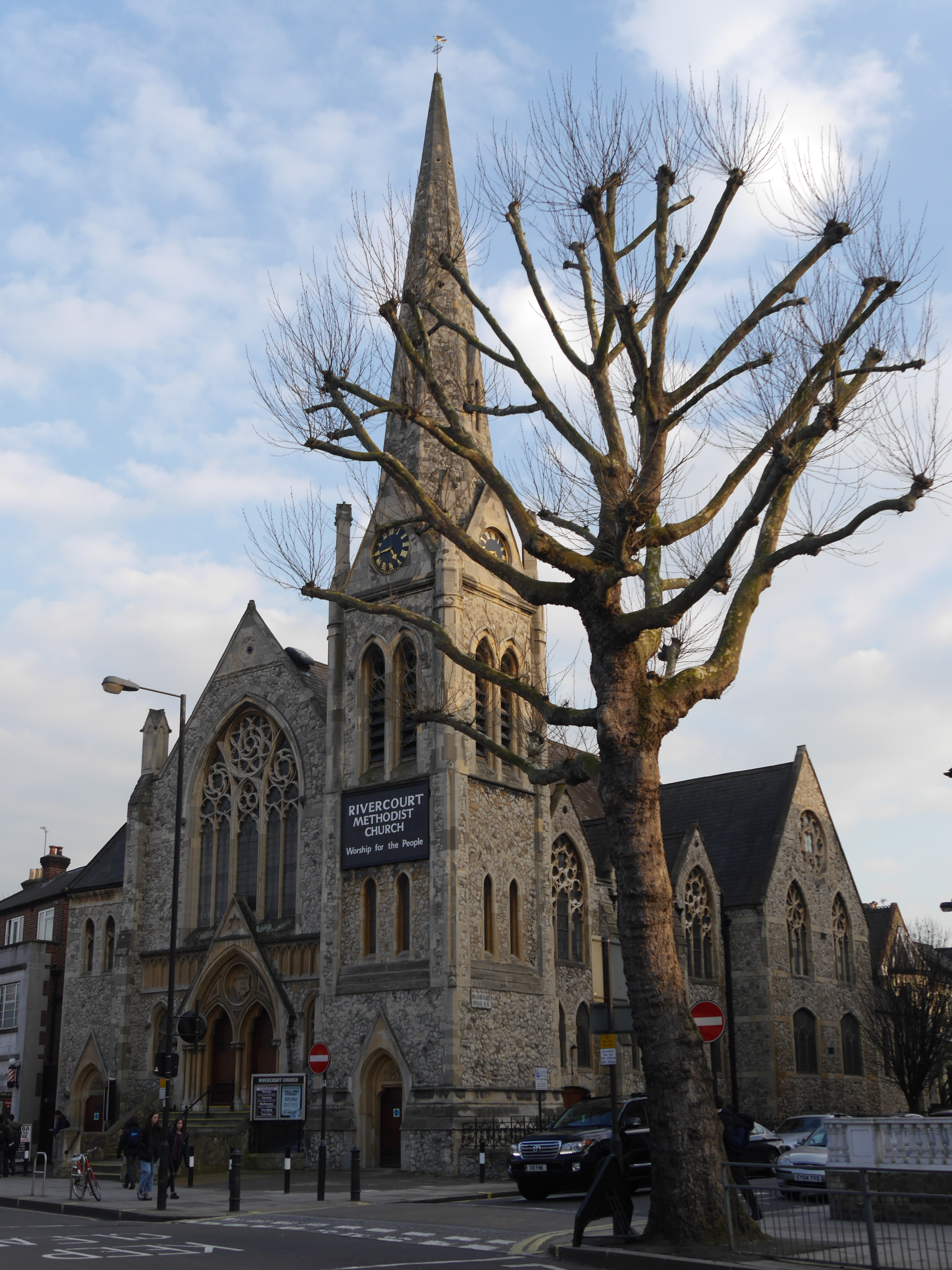
Rivercourt Methodist Church, Hammersmith, London, designed by Charles Bell

- Charles Bell (1846–1899), architect
- William Clarke (1609–1682), apothecary and tutor to Isaac Newton
- Maxwell Hutchinson (born 1948), architect
- Isaac Newton (1643–1727), physicist and mathematician
- Mark A. O'Neill (born 1959), biologist and computer scientist
- Thomas James Smith (1827–1896), pharmacist and founder of the medical equipment firm Smith & Nephew

=== Sport ===
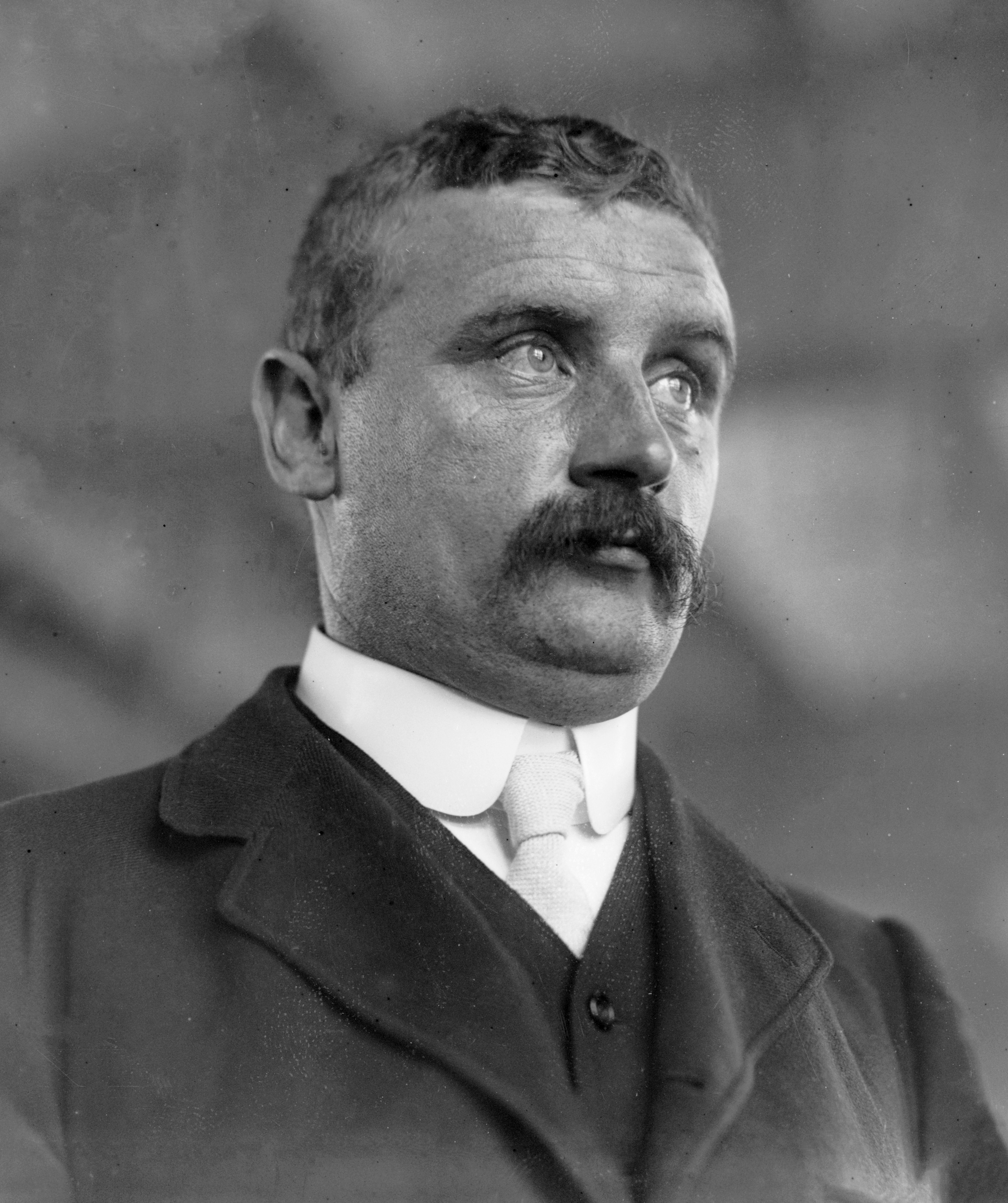
The Olympic gold medal-winning tennis player, Charles P. Dixon

- Shaun Balfe (born 1972), racing driver
- Patrick Bamford (born 1993), professional footballer with Leeds United and the England national football team
- Terry Bly (1935–2009), professional footballer, died in Grantham
- Ian Bowyer (born 1951), professional footballer
- Roderick Bradley (born 1983), American footballer
- John Broughton (1873–1952), first-class cricketer
- Charles P. Dixon (1873–1939), Olympic gold, silver and bronze medal-winning tennis player
- Mathew Dowman (born 1974), first-class cricketer
- Ross Edgley (born 1985), athlete, ultra-marathon swimmer, author
- Dave Gilbert (born 1963), professional footballer
- Arthur Green (1885 – post-1912), professional footballer
- Timothy Grubb (1954–2010), Olympic show jumper
- Cyril Hatton (1918–1987), professional footballer
- Richard Holmes (born 1980), professional footballer
- Richard Howitt (born 1977), first-class cricketer
- Vikki Hubbard (born 1989), international high jumper
- Dickie Joynes (1877–1949), professional footballer
- Alastair McCorquodale (1925–2009), Scottish athlete and first-class cricketer, died in Grantham
- Harry Pringle (1900–1965), professional footballer, died in Grantham
- Arnold Rylott (1839–1914), first-class cricketer
- David Storer (born 1968), former cricketer
- Simon Terry (1974–2021), Olympic bronze medal-winning archer
- Tom Wells (born 1993), first-class cricketer
- William Woof (1858–1937), first-class cricketer
- Ashley Wright (born 1980), first-class cricketer
- Luke Wright (born 1985), first-class cricketer

== See also ==
- Blue pubs
