= Grantham Preparatory School =

Independent preparatory school in Grantham, Lincolnshire, England

Location
- Gorse Lane; Grantham, Lincolnshire, NG31 7UF; England
- Coordinates: 52.894732°N 0.640246°W

Information
- Type: Private preparatory day school
- Established: 1986
- Local authority: Lincolnshire
- Department for Education URN: 120738 Tables
- Ofsted: Reports
- Head: Kathryn Korcz
- Staff: 11
- Gender: Coeducational
- Age: 3 to 11
- Enrolment: 120~
- Website: http://www.granthamprep.co.uk/

Grantham Preparatory School is a private preparatory school in Grantham, Lincolnshire, England.

== History ==
It was founded in 1986 by a local individual. The school is now operated by A for E Limited, a subsidiary of the International Education Systems (IES) Limited organisation, and is administered by a board of three directors.

== Curriculum ==
The school curriculum was rated outstanding in the 2008 Ofsted inspection.

== Extracurricular activities ==
The 2011 ISI Inspection noted that the school "wins many awards in local music and speech and drama festivals, and in 2010 gained the Gold Artsmark award in recognition of the high standards achieved in art, music, dance and drama."
