= Gonerby Hill Foot =

Area of Grantham, Lincolnshire, England

Coordinates: 52.924°N 0.656°W

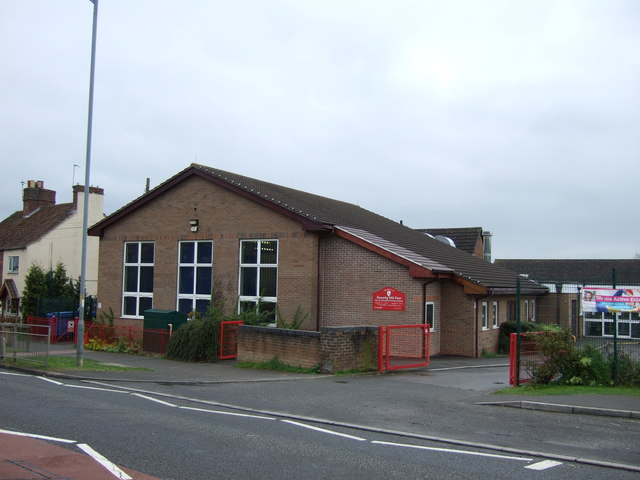
- Gonerby Hill Foot Primary School, Grantham

- Location within Lincolnshire
  - London: 112 mi (180 km) S
- Civil parish: Grantham
- District: South Kesteven
- Shire county: Lincolnshire
- Region: East Midlands
- Country: England
- Sovereign state: United Kingdom
- Post town: GRANTHAM
- Postcode district: NG31
- Police: Lincolnshire
- Fire: Lincolnshire
- Ambulance: East Midlands
- UK Parliament: Grantham and Bourne

Gonerby Hill Foot (previously Gonerby Hillfoot) is an area of Grantham in South Kesteven in Lincolnshire, England. It is directly to the north-west of Grantham town centre, and near the border with Great Gonerby.

Gonerby Hill was said to be the steepest hill on the Great North Road from London to Edinburgh, until 1825 when the gradient was reduced by work done by Italian prisoners from Norman Cross Prison. There is a mounting block dated 1703 at Gonerby Hill Foot, one of a series erected by Edmund Boulter along roads he regularly travelled. The 1885 edition of Kelly's Directory of Lincolnshire states Gonerby Hillfoot is a hamlet in Great Gonerby parish, with the alternative name of Middle Gonerby (being between Little Gonerby and Great Gonerby), and lists a maltster, a brickmaker, and a shopkeeper in the hamlet, noting also that there is a wall letterbox. In 1901, The Grantham Journal commented on the growth of Middle Gonerby compared with a decade or two earlier, when it had very few residents. An elementary school opened in 1908, a forerunner of Gonerby Hill Foot Primary School. On 1 October 1930, Gonerby Hill Foot became part of the enlarged borough of Grantham.

Gonerby Hill Foot is mostly residential; small "pockets" of older terraced housing remain, but from the 1970s onwards medium density semi-detached and detached housing developments have been built, many roads being cul-de-sacs. The Vaculug commercial vehicle tyre retreading factory on Gonerby Road was established in the 1950s, shortly after the firm was founded.

The grade II listed Gonerby House at Gonerby Hill Foot is Jacobean with Georgian and Victorian extensions. It was used for student accommodation by The King's School for a period until 2002 and has since been divided into several residences.
