= David Storer =

English cricketer (born 1968)

Personal information
- Full name: David Benjamin Storer
- Born: 31 March 1968 (age 58); Grantham, Lincolnshire, England
- Batting: Right-handed
- Bowling: Right-arm medium

Domestic team information
- Years: Team
- 1987–1995: Lincolnshire

Career statistics
Competition	List A
Matches	3
Runs scored	29
Batting average	9.66
100s/50s	–/–
Top score	28
Balls bowled	30
Wickets	1
Bowling average	17.00
5 wickets in innings	–
10 wickets in match	–
Best bowling	1/17
Catches/stumpings	1/–
- Source: Cricinfo, 25 June 2011

David Benjamin Storer (born 31 March 1968) is a former English cricketer. Storer was a right-handed batsman who bowled right-arm medium pace.

== Early life ==
He was born in Grantham, Lincolnshire. He grew up in Allington, Lincolnshire, and attended Ranby House, Worksop College and Newcastle University.

== Career ==
Storer made his debut for Lincolnshire in the 1987 Minor Counties Championship against Staffordshire. Storer played Minor counties cricket for Lincolnshire from 1987 to 1995, which included 47 Minor Counties Championship matches and 10 MCCA Knockout Trophy matches. He made his List A debut against Gloucestershire in the 1990 NatWest Trophy. He played 2 further List A matches for Lincolnshire, against Nottinghamshire in the 1991 NatWest Trophy and Glamorgan in the 1994 NatWest Trophy. In his 3 matches, he scored 29 runs at an average of 9.66, with a high score of 28. He took a single wicket with the ball, which came when against Nottinghamshire, with Storer dismissing Derek Randall for the cost of 17 runs from 5 overs.

In June 1995 David entered the record books being the first Lincolnshire batsman to score centuries in both innings of a match, and become only the fifth to do it of all time. In the match against Buckinghamshire he scored 150 not out in the first innings and 102 in the second as Lincolnshire won by 150 runs
