= John Broughton (cricketer) =

English cricketer

John Jarvis Broughton (8 September 1873 – 3 April 1952) was an English cricketer active from 1901 to 1914 who played for Lancashire. He was born in Grantham and died in Orrell. He appeared in six first-class matches as a righthanded batsman, scoring 153 runs with a highest score of 99, and held three catches.
