= Les Routiers =

Travel guide book company

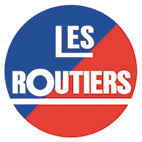
- Industry: Travel publishing
- Founded: 1934
- Founder: François de Saulieu
- Headquarters: 39/41 The Parade, Claygate, Surrey, KT10 0PD
- Area served: UK, France
- Products: Restaurant and hotel guide books

Les Routiers is a company that provides travel guide books for eating out and hotels.

== History ==
It began in France in 1935.

In 1970 it opened a UK-based company.

In 2002 an article in The Daily Telegraph claimed that the company charged up to £900 for an entry in their guide book, with the reviews written by sales managers.

The British franchise is headquartered near Claygate railway station.

The company presents annual 'Les Routiers in Britain Awards'.
