= Etta Lemon =

English bird conservationist (1860–1953)

Etta Lemon MBE
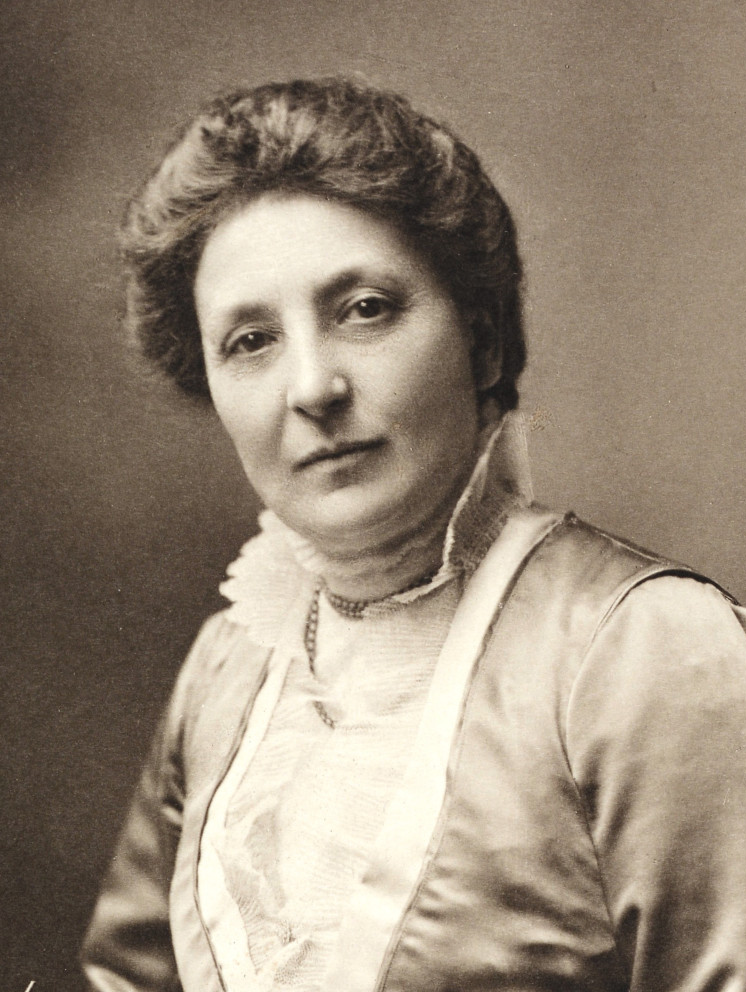
- As lady mayoress of Reigate in 1913
- Born: Margaretta Louisa Smith; 22 November 1860; Hythe, Kent, England
- Died: 8 July 1953 (aged 92); Redhill, Surrey, England
- Burial place: Reigate cemetery
- Known for: Founding member of RSPB
- Spouse: Frank Lemon (m. 1892; died 1935)

Margaretta "Etta" Louisa Lemon MBE (née Smith; 22 November 1860 – 8 July 1953) was an English bird conservationist and a founding member of what is now the Royal Society for the Protection of Birds (RSPB).

She was born into an evangelical Christian family in Kent, and after her father's death she increasingly campaigned against the use of plumage in hatmaking which had led to billions of birds being killed for their feathers. She may have been part of the Fur, Fin and Feather Folk with Eliza Phillips in Croydon and Catherine Victoria Hall in London in 1889, which two years later merged with Emily Williamson's Manchester-based Society for the Protection of Birds (SPB), also founded in 1889. The new organisation adopted the SPB title, and the constitution for the merged society was written by Frank Lemon, who became its legal adviser. Etta married Frank Lemon in 1892, and as Mrs Lemon she became the first honorary secretary of the SPB, a post she kept until 1904, when the society became the RSPB.

The Lemons led the RSPB for more than three decades, although Etta's conservatism, authoritarian management and opposition to scientific ornithology increasingly led to clashes with the organisation's committee. She was pressured to resign from her leadership role in 1938, aged 79. During her tenure, the Importation of Plumage (Prohibition) Act 1921 restricted the international trade in feathers, but did not prevent their being sold or worn.

Lemon was appointed a Member of the Order of the British Empire in 1920 for her management of the Redhill War Hospital during the First World War. She worked for many other organisations, including the Royal Earlswood Hospital, the Women's National Anti-Suffrage League, and the local Red Cross branch. Lemon was one of the first four female honorary members of the British Ornithologists' Union (BOU) admitted in 1909, although she never considered herself to be an ornithologist. She died at Redhill aged 92 in 1953 and was buried next to her husband at Reigate cemetery.

== Early life ==
Margaretta Louisa Smith was born on 22 November 1860 in Hythe, Kent, to William Elisha Smith and Louisa Smith (née Barclay). William Smith was a captain of musketry in the Royal Sherwood Fusiliers, later to become the Sherwood Foresters, and was adjutant at the musketry training school in Hythe. Etta was the oldest of three children, followed by her brother Edward and sister Woltera Mercy. Etta's mother had a stillborn baby in 1866 and died giving birth in 1867, along with the newborn child. Her father married 26-year-old Mary Anne Wollaston later in the same year. Etta and Mercy (the names that the sisters preferred to be called) initially lived with their father and stepmother at their new home in Blackheath, then a Kenitsh village ten km to the south-east of London. At about this time, Captain Smith left the army. From 1868 until his death in 1899, he served as honorary secretary of the Evangelisation Society, which aimed to promote the gospel in hard-to-reach situations.

Etta was soon sent to Hill House boarding school in Belstead, Suffolk, run by Maria Umphelby—another evangelical Christian—and remained there until she was 16. She returned briefly to Blackheath before being sent to a finishing school in Lausanne, Switzerland, where she became fluent in French. Her brother Edward went to study medicine at Cambridge. He later took on the name Barclay-Smith and served as a professor of anatomy.

After returning to Blackheath aged 18, Etta joined her father in his evangelical work, writing pamphlets and accompanying him on daily train journeys to London, where she learned to speak in public at evangelical meetings. On these journeys, they often met William Lemon and his son, both lawyers. The younger Lemon shared Etta's views on cruelty to animals and the practice of using birds in hat-making (then called millinery).

== The feather trade ==
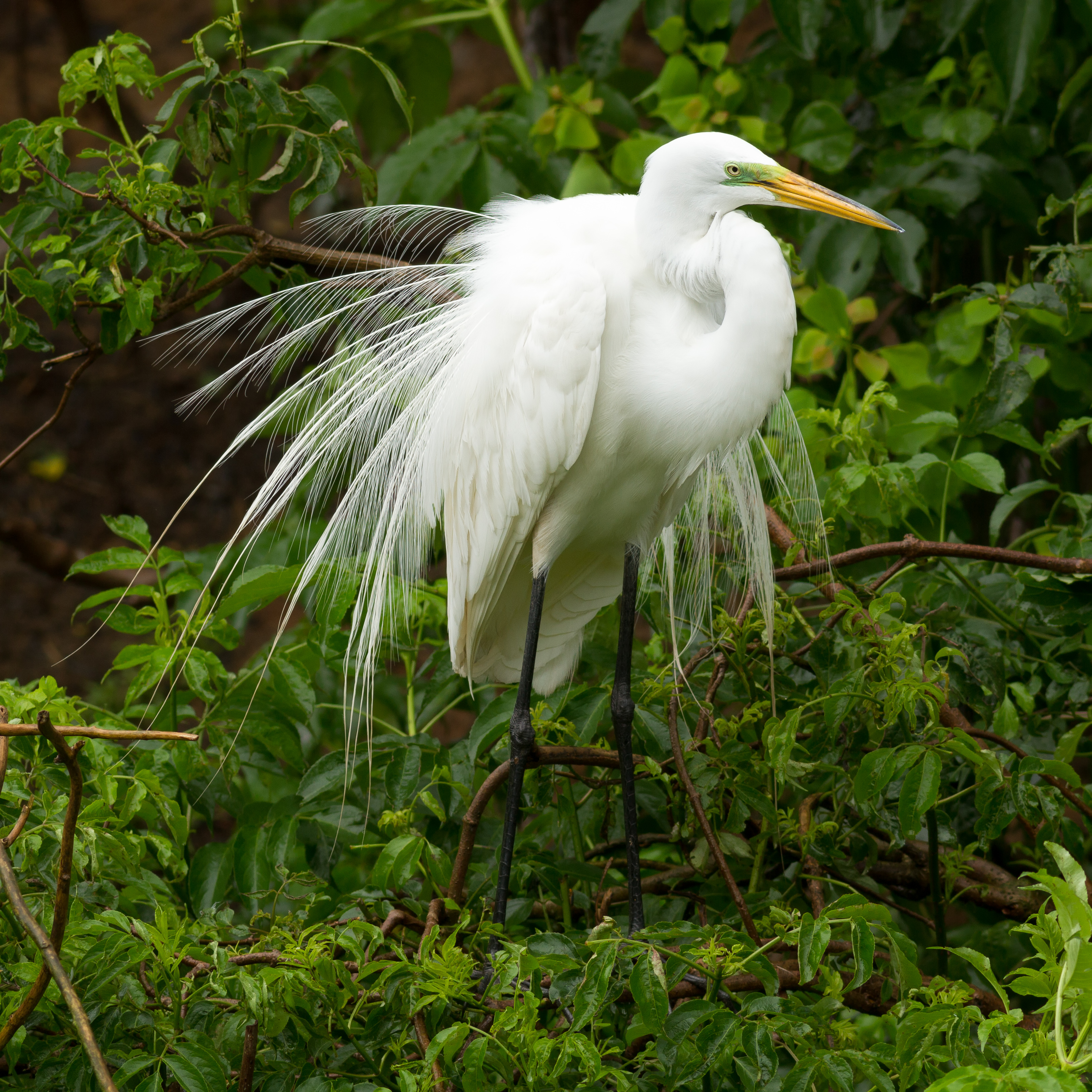
Great egret showing the breeding season plumes used in hatmaking

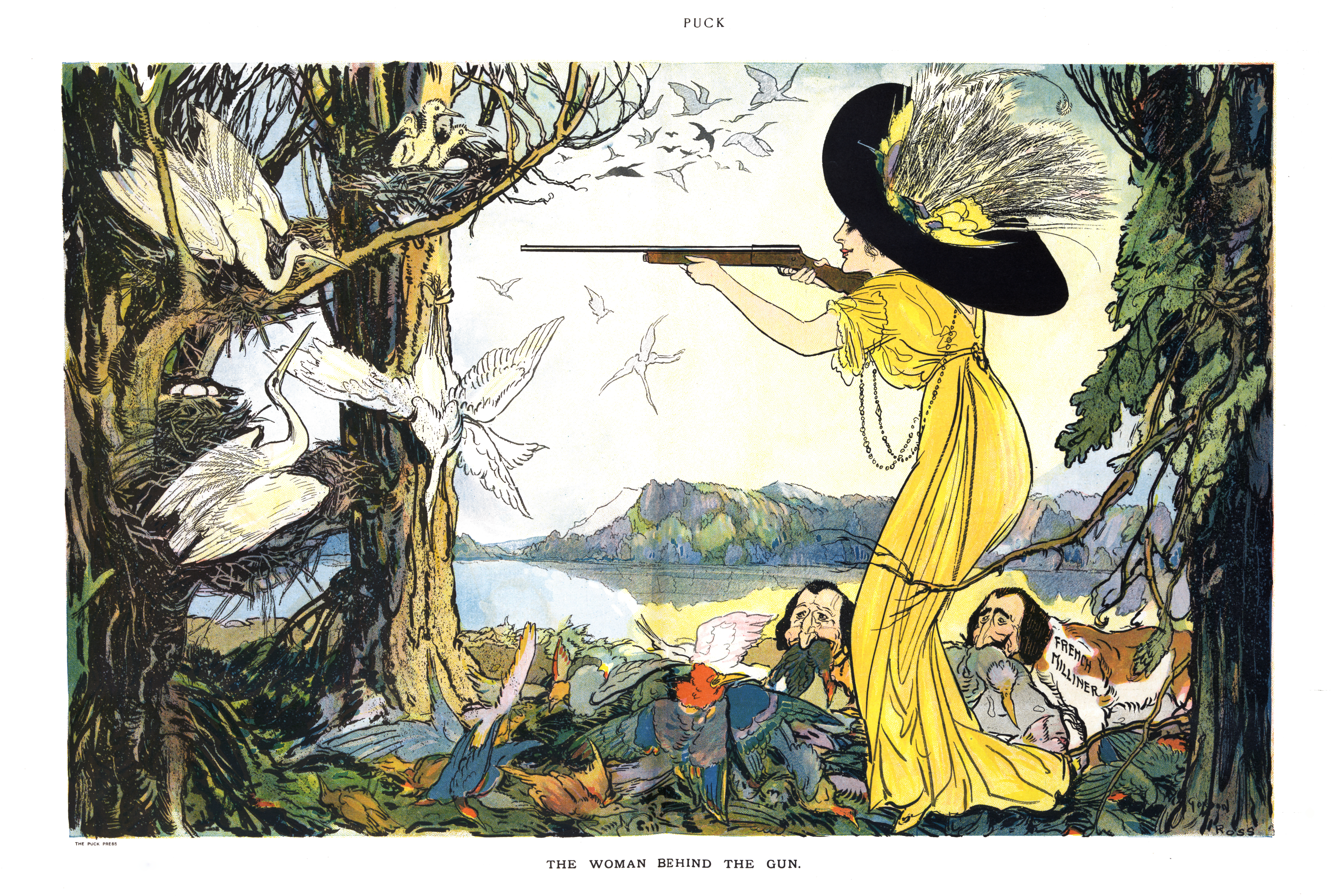
A 1911 Puck cartoon showing how plumed hats resulted in the demise of snowy egrets

A major threat to birds from the late eighteenth century (Note: Legend attributes the start of the fashion to Marie Antoinette.) up to just after the First World War was the demand for feathers to decorate women's hats. Although some were obtained from farmed ostriches, huge numbers of wild birds were killed for the millinery trade, many of which were egrets, leading to the trade term "aigrette" for such plumes. (Note: "Osprey" was an alternative term, although these birds were unlikely to be a significant source of feathers.) Many other species were also used in fashion, ranging from hummingbirds to storks and cranes.

Between 1870 and 1920, 18,400 tonnes (18,100 long tons; 20,300 short tons) of wild bird feathers were imported into the UK, and since 150–300 birds were needed for 1 kilogram (2.2 lb) of their decorative breeding plumes, this implied that billions of birds were killed to meet the British demand alone. Shooting breeding birds effectively led to the failure of their eggs and chicks to survive, causing actual losses to be much higher. At its peak, the British trade was worth £20 million annually, around £204 million at 2021 prices.

=== Anti-plume movements ===
Smith was inspired by Scottish naturalist Eliza Brightwen's Wild Nature Won by Kindness (1890) on the killing of birds for the plume trade. (Note: Brightwen quoted H. Stacy Marks in a footnote in her chapter "How to Observe Nature": Many people regarding birds in but three aspects—as things to be either eaten, shot, or worn. ... No natural history of a bird is complete without recording where the last specimen was shot; and should a rare bird visit our shores, the hospitality which we accord to the foreign refugee is denied, and it is bound to be the victim of powder and shot. The fashion of wearing birds or their plumage as part of ladies' attire, threatens to exterminate many beautiful species, such as the humming-birds of South America, the glossy starlings of Africa, and the glorious Impeyan pheasant of the Himalayas, with many other species.) At church she would see women who were wearing feathered hats, and send them a note explaining how birds were killed to make them. There is no evidence that she worked with the wildlife activist Eliza Phillips, (Note: When she died, Phillips' will left half her estate, valued at more than £100,000 (equivalent to £7,520,640 in 2025), "for the protection of and relief of suffering of beasts and birds".) before 1891 although at some point the women must have communicated with Emily Williamson possibly in response to Emily's letters to newspapers. Other women included the wealthy, unmarried Catherine Hall, and the 15-year-old Hannah Poland, a fish merchant's daughter. Members pledged not to wear the feathers of any bird not killed for food, excepting the ostrich, which was farmed for its plumes. The organisation had a subscription of two pence, and in its first year its membership was nearly 5,000.

In 1891 the Society for the Protection of Birds (SPB), founded in 1889 by philanthropist Emily Williamson at Didsbury, Manchester moved south to London. The move was brokered by the Royal Society for the Prevention of Cruelty to Animals (RSPCA) which did not itself wish to take up the plumage cause; as a moderate mainstream organisation, it was politic for it to keep some distance from what was seen as an extremist movement. Although the organisation continued with the SPB title, in practice the London group provided all of its administration. The constitution for the society was written by Frank Lemon, who also served as its legal advisor. Etta married Lemon in 1892, and as Mrs Lemon she became the second honorary secretary succeeding Hannah Poland, a post she kept until 1904. In 1898 she was elected a Fellow of the Zoological Society of London.

The SPB had its own office in London by 1897, and sent more than 16,000 letters and 50,000 leaflets; it had 20,000 members by the following year. Although the organisation was founded as all-female, the nature writer William Henry Hudson was associated with Smith and Phillips from the start, and generous donations came from ornithologists including Professor Alfred Newton, who gave one guinea, Lord Lilford, president of the British Ornithologists' Union, and J. A. Harvie-Brown, who both donated £10. (Note: At 2021 rates, £10 is equivalent to about £4,500, and a guinea nearly £500.) Prominent men were also enlisted as speakers or supporters. These included Brooke Foss Westcott, Bishop of Durham, the politician Sir Edward Grey and the soldier Lord Wolseley.

Two earlier campaigning organisations founded in 1885, the Selborne League and the Plumage League, had amalgamated in the following year as the Selborne Society, but were soon outstripped by the SPB because of the latter organisation's extensive network of local branches and its single-issue focus.

=== RSPB ===
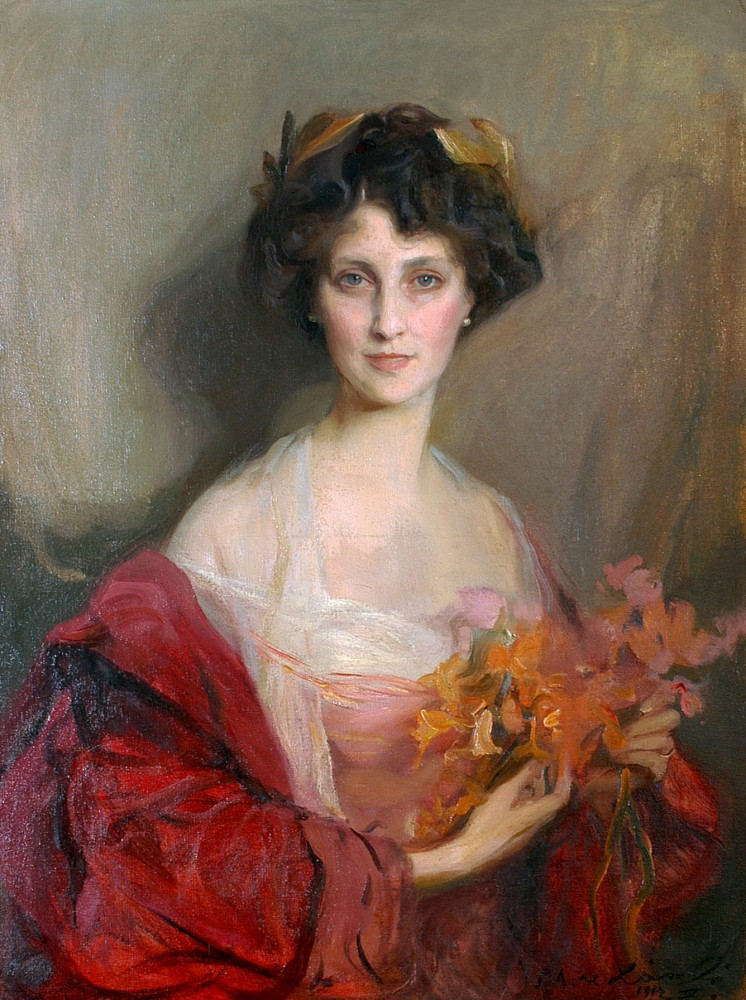
Winifred, Duchess of Portland, painted by Philip de László in 1912

From 1891 to her death in 1954, the president of the SPB was Winifred Cavendish-Bentinck, Duchess of Portland. Teetotaler, vegetarian and a supporter of many humanitarian causes, she was important to the society because of her aristocratic connections. She was as Mistress of the Robes to Queen Alexandra, consort of Edward VII, and her Duke was Master of the Horse, both roles that placed the couple close to the monarchy. The duchess left Etta Lemon to deal with much of her correspondence on bird matters.

In 1904, the queen gave her approval for the SPB to be incorporated by Royal Charter and become the Royal Society for the Protection of Birds RSPB. Lemon could not continue as honorary secretary since the charter excluded women from leading the organisation. She therefore conducted the society's daily business as the honorary secretary of the society's publishers and watchers committees. Her previous position was taken up by Frank Lemon, and the couple remained in their posts for the next 31 years. In 1913, Lemon arranged for lighthouses be fitted with perches for migrating birds to rest on, and established a system of "watchers" to monitor vulnerable bird breeding sites.

A bill to control the trade in feathers was unsuccessfully introduced in parliament in 1908. Feathers were among the luxury items whose import was banned from February 1917 for the duration of the First World War. In July 1919, Lemon and the Duchess of Portland delivered a letter signed by 150 men, including celebrities such as H. G. Wells and Thomas Hardy, to the president of the Board of Trade, Sir Auckland Geddes, asking that the war-time restriction on the importation of plumage should be continued until legislation was passed. Geddes replied that the import restriction would continue "as long as possible" and that he "hoped" that the bill would be passed early in 1920. The Importation of Plumage (Prohibition) Act was passed in 1921 and received royal assent on 1 April 1922. The Act had limited effect, since it only banned the import of feathers, not the sale or wearing of plumes.

Frank Lemon died suddenly in April 1935, aged 76, and Etta took over his role as honorary secretary. When the secretary of the RSPB, Linda Gardiner, retired in 1935, there was a proposal to replace her with a man, apparently to give the society greater acceptability. This idea was opposed by the two women assistant secretaries Beatrice Solly and Lemon's niece Phyllis Barclay-Smith. Lemon did not support the women assistants' plea for gender equality, and when they threatened to resign, she accepted their resignations, and did not give their names when she mentioned their departure in the society's magazine.

Lemon soon came under scrutiny in The Field where an editorial in 1936 questioned the Society's inaction on cage birds, its gambling on real estate investment, its high expenditure, and its elderly management. This led to the establishment of a six-member committee headed by Julian Huxley of the Zoological Society of London that proposed changes in the management which included fixed terms for elected members. These rules came into effect in 1960, well after Lemon's death. By 1938, the 79-year-old Lemon had lost much of her influence. The post of honorary secretary had been abolished, and practices she disapproved of, such as bird ringing and close photography, had been adopted by the RSPB, whereas she felt that her watchers were undervalued. She bowed to the inevitable and submitted her resignation from the committee to the Duchess of Portland in the same year.

== Other activities ==
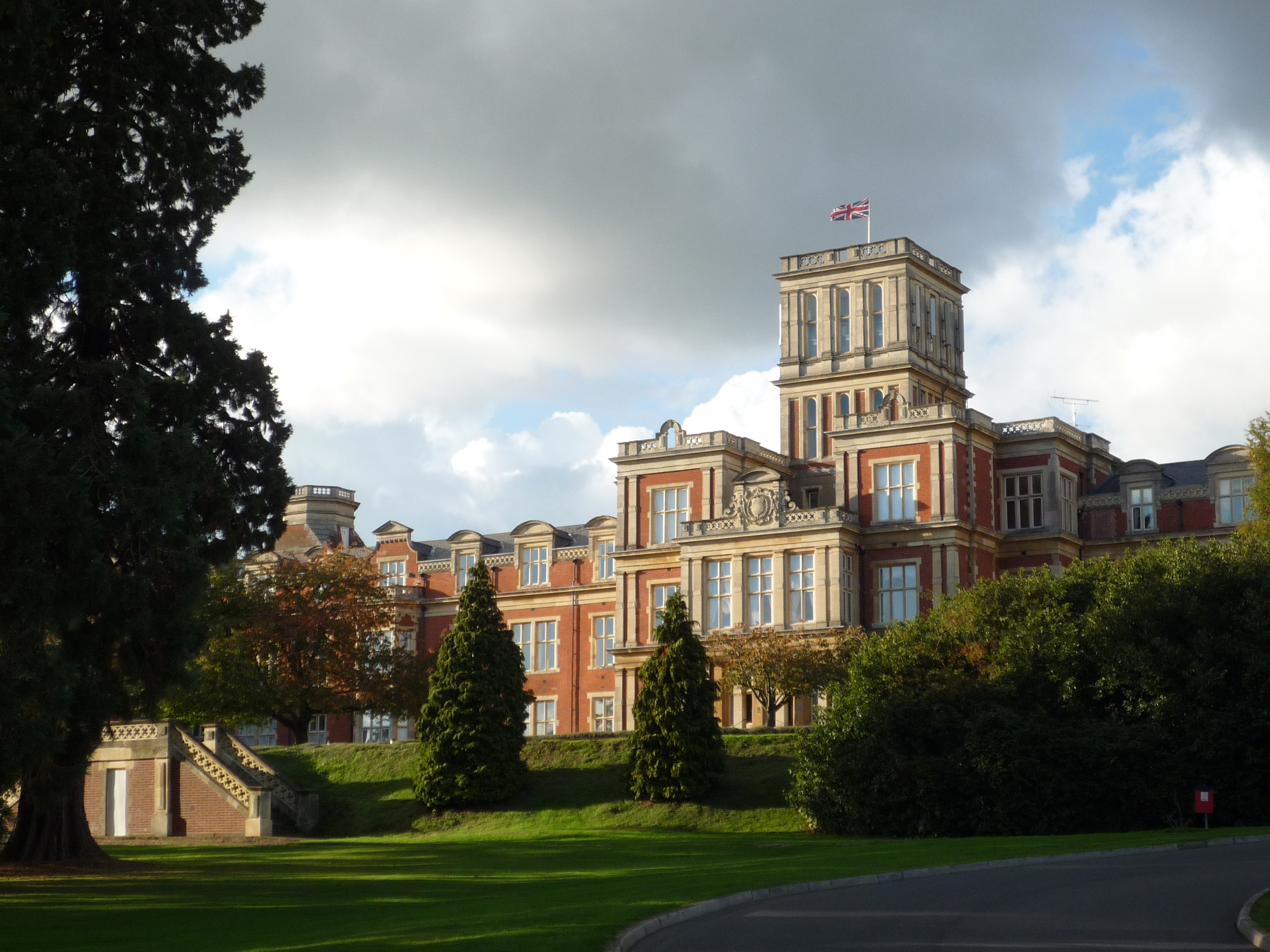
Royal Earlswood Hospital in 2010

Apart from the anti-plumage organisations, the other mass female-based movement at the turn of the century was women's suffrage, spearheaded in the UK by Emmeline Pankhurst's Women's Social and Political Union. Many of the conservative and religious leaders of the SPB were opposed to women's suffrage, and many suffragettes wore plumed hats as a badge of identity. An 1896 SPB pamphlet A Woman's Question written by Blanche Atkinson and distributed by Lemon noted that the wearing of plumes by women was a good reason to deny the right to vote: "if women are so empty-headed and stupid that they cannot be made to understand the cruelty of which they are guilty in that matter, they certainly prove themselves to be unfit to be voters, and to enter the learned professions on equal terms with men." Lemon became a committee member of the Women's National Anti-Suffrage League founded in 1908.

Lemon also worked with the Royal Earlswood Hospital in Redhill, Surrey, one of the first establishments to cater specifically for people with developmental disabilities, and the Crescent House Convalescent Home, Brighton.

In 1911, Frank Lemon became mayor of Reigate, and as lady mayoress, Etta became involved in his civic duties, including organising a Christmas party for 100 children. She was a quartermaster of the local Red Cross branch, member of the workhouse board of guardians, and treasurer of the Children's Care Association.

In 1917, during the First World War, the British Army requisitioned Redhill workhouse infirmary as a war hospital, and Lemon, now 57, was appointed as its commandant in charge of 50 staff and 80 patients. She raised funds for a recreation room, rest chairs and 100 feeding cups for her patients. She was made an MBE in 1920 in recognition of her work at the hospital, and in the following year she was appointed as a justice of the peace, thereby becoming one of Reigate's first two women magistrates.

Lemon died at Redhill on 8 July 1953 aged 92, and was buried next to her husband at St Mary's Church Cemetery, Reigate. Her estate was valued at probate at £13,770 5s 5d. (Note: About £393,100 at 2020 prices calculated using MeasuringWorth (relative value £ UK purchasing power).)

== Recognition and legacy ==
Lemon was one of the first four female honorary members of the British Ornithologists' Union (BOU), admitted in 1909; the others were the Duchess of Bedford, Dorothea Bate and Emma Turner. Despite her election to this previously all-male organisation, Lemon never considered herself an ornithologist. She saw professional ornithologists as largely unsupportive of her cause, and since much BOU activity at the time involved egg-collecting and killing birds for study and for their skins, she saw them as part of the problem she was trying to solve.

Lemon's selflessness won her the admiration of many, particularly her watchers and the soldiers from the war hospital, but her conservatism and authoritarian methods earned her the nickname of "The Dragon" at the RSPB. Perhaps due to this, recognition of her work decreased after her death, but from 2018 her reputation began to be rehabilitated. Her picture now hangs in the RSPB headquarters and she is featured on its website. In 2021, Nature's Home, the RSPB magazine, published an article commemorating the women who founded the society, Lemon, Williamson, Phillips and Winifred Portland.

== Publications ==
- Lemon, Margaretta L. (1895). "The Bird of Paradise". Nature. 52 (1339): 197. Bibcode:1895Natur..52..197L. doi:10.1038/052197f0. ISSN 1476-4687.

== Cited texts ==
- Boase, Tessa (2021). Etta Lemon: The Woman Who Saved the Birds. London: Aurum. ISBN 978-0-7112-6338-3. (Originally published as Mrs Pankhurst's Purple Feather, 2018)
- Brightwen, Eliza (1890). Wild Nature Won by Kindness (fifth ed.). London: T Fisher Unwin.
- Clarke, Richard (2004). Pioneers of conservation; The Selborne Society and the (Royal) SPB (PDF). London: The Selborne Society and Birkbeck College Centre for European Protected Area Research.
- Cocker, Mark (2013). Birds and People. London: Jonathan Cape. ISBN 978-0-224-08174-0.
