= Fletcher Moss Botanical Garden =

Public park in Didsbury, Manchester, England

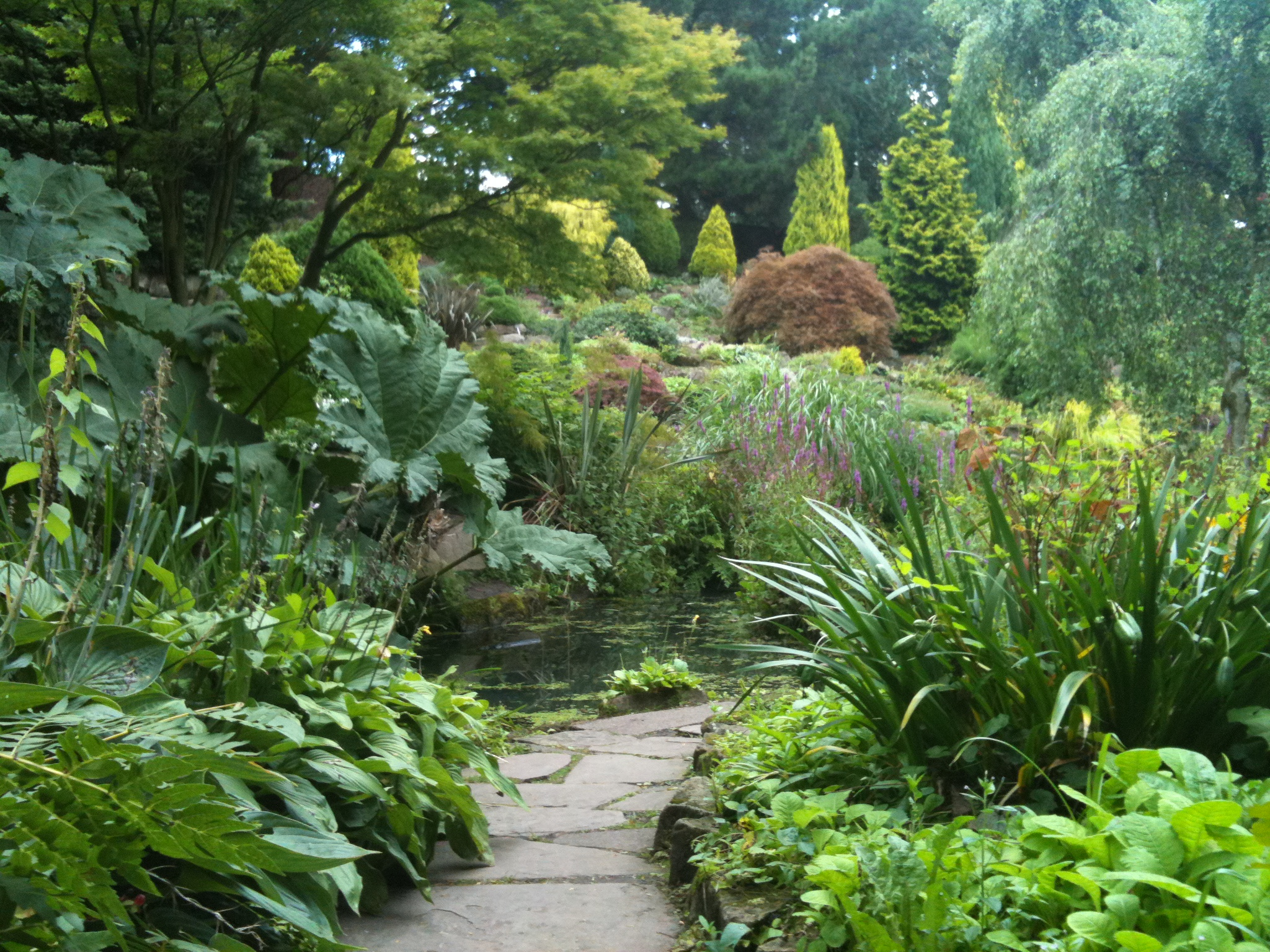
- The rock garden, Fletcher Moss
- Interactive map of Fletcher Moss Botanical Garden
- Type: Park with alpine rock garden and nature reserve
- Location: Didsbury, Manchester, England
- Coordinates: 53°24′30″N 02°13′50″W
- Area: 90 acres (36 ha)
- Created: 1919
- Operator: Manchester City Council
- Public transit: East Didsbury railway station (10-minute walk); East Didsbury Metrolink station (15-minute walk)
- Website: Manchester parks department website

Fletcher Moss Botanical Garden is a public park in Didsbury, Manchester, England, between the River Mersey and Stenner Woods.

The park is named after Alderman Fletcher Moss, who donated the park to the city of Manchester in 1915. It is part garden and part wildlife habitat, but also offers recreational facilities such as tennis courts, rugby and football pitches, and a family-run café and ice cream parlour.

== History ==
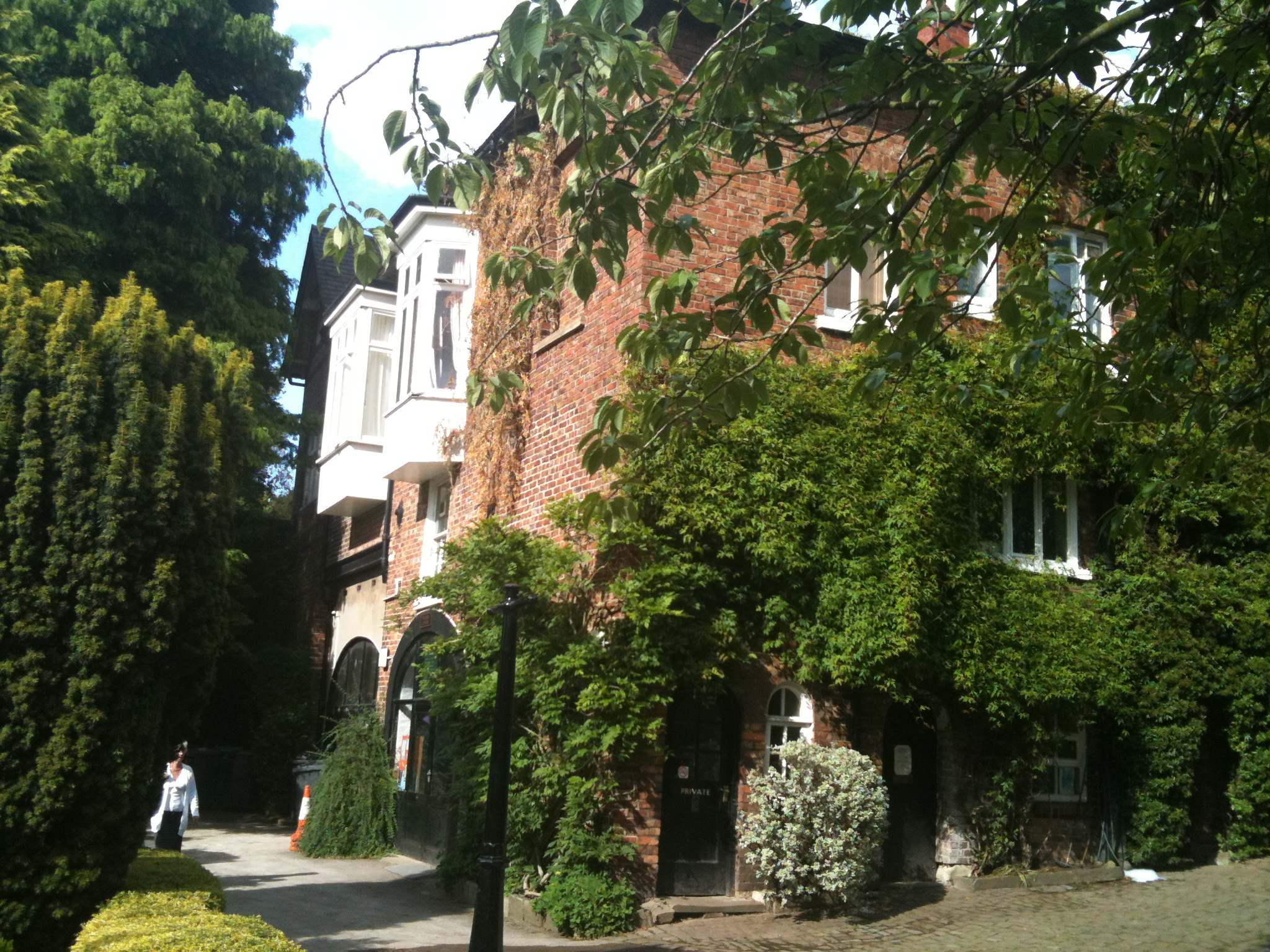
The Croft, where the Society for the Protection of Birds was founded in 1889

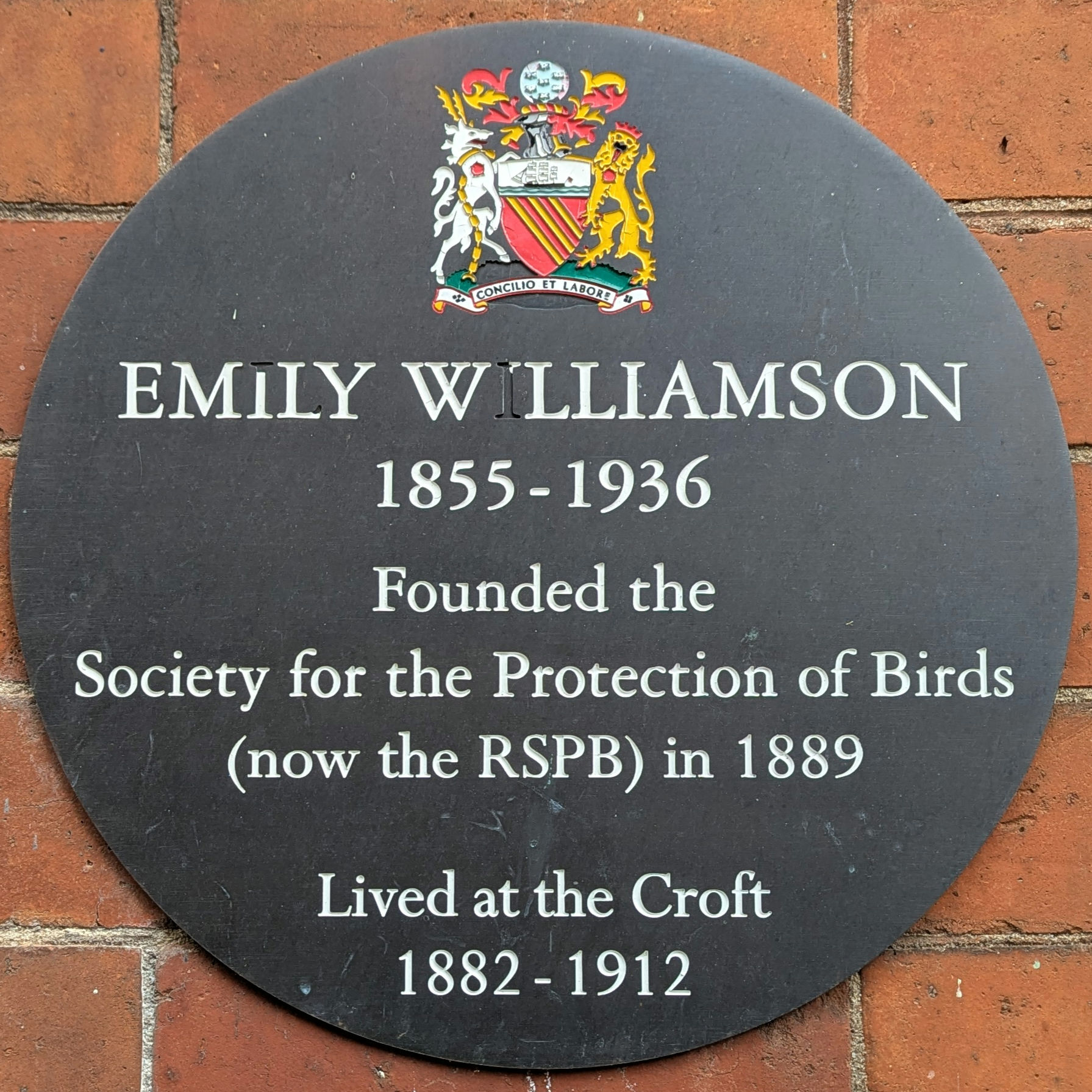
A plaque commemorating Emily Williamson's former home in the garden

The main part of the gardens is a walled rock garden that was laid out by the botanist Robert Wood Williamson on a south-facing slope. Williamson sold the gardens and rockery along with his house, called The Croft, to Alderman Fletcher Moss, in 1912.

Fletcher Moss, born in July 1843, was a philanthropist who led many public works in Manchester; in 1915 he persuaded the philanthropist Andrew Carnegie to fund the construction of a public library in Didsbury. He lived in the Old Parsonage by St James's Church, Stenner Lane, having taken over residence from the vicar, a Rev. W. J. Kidd, who left the property complaining it was haunted. In 1919 he gave the gardens to the people of Manchester, declaring he had "determined to offer all that part of my property extending from the Fletcher Moss Playing Fields to Stenner Lane, to the corporation if I could retain the use of it for my life".

Robert Williamson's old house, the Croft, was the location of the first meeting of the Society for the Protection of Birds, later the RSPB. In 1889, Emily Williamson née Bateson (Robert's wife) formed a group called the "Plumage League" to protest against the breeding of birds for plumage to be used in women's hats, a highly fashionable practice at the time. The group gained popularity and eventually amalgamated with "The Fur, Fin and Feather Folk" in Croydon, and formed the RSPB as described in Mrs Pankhurst's Purple Feather. A statue of Emily Williamson has been commissioned from Eve Shepherd and is planned to be installed in the park.

== Layout ==
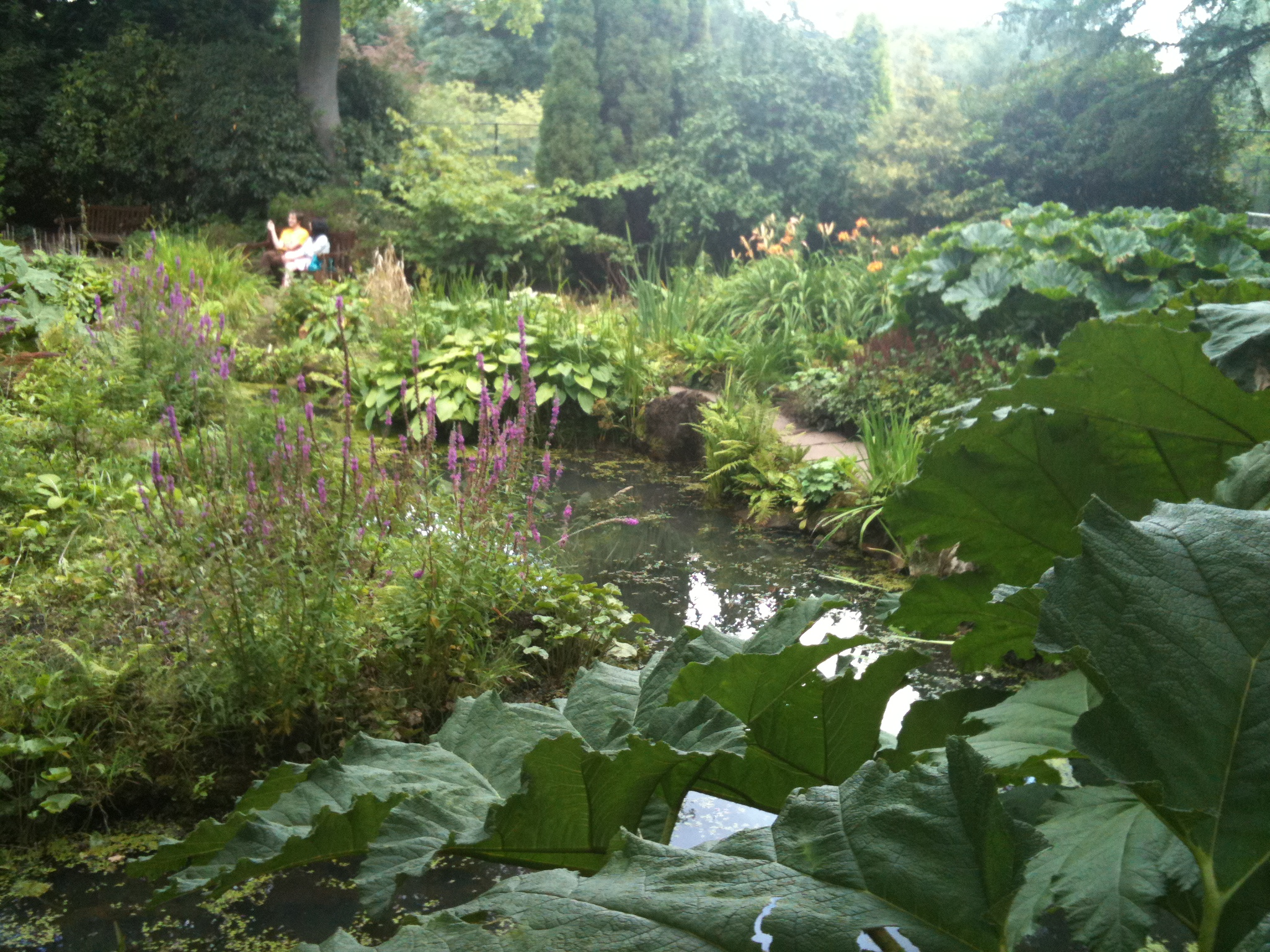
Giant Gunnera leaves by the pond

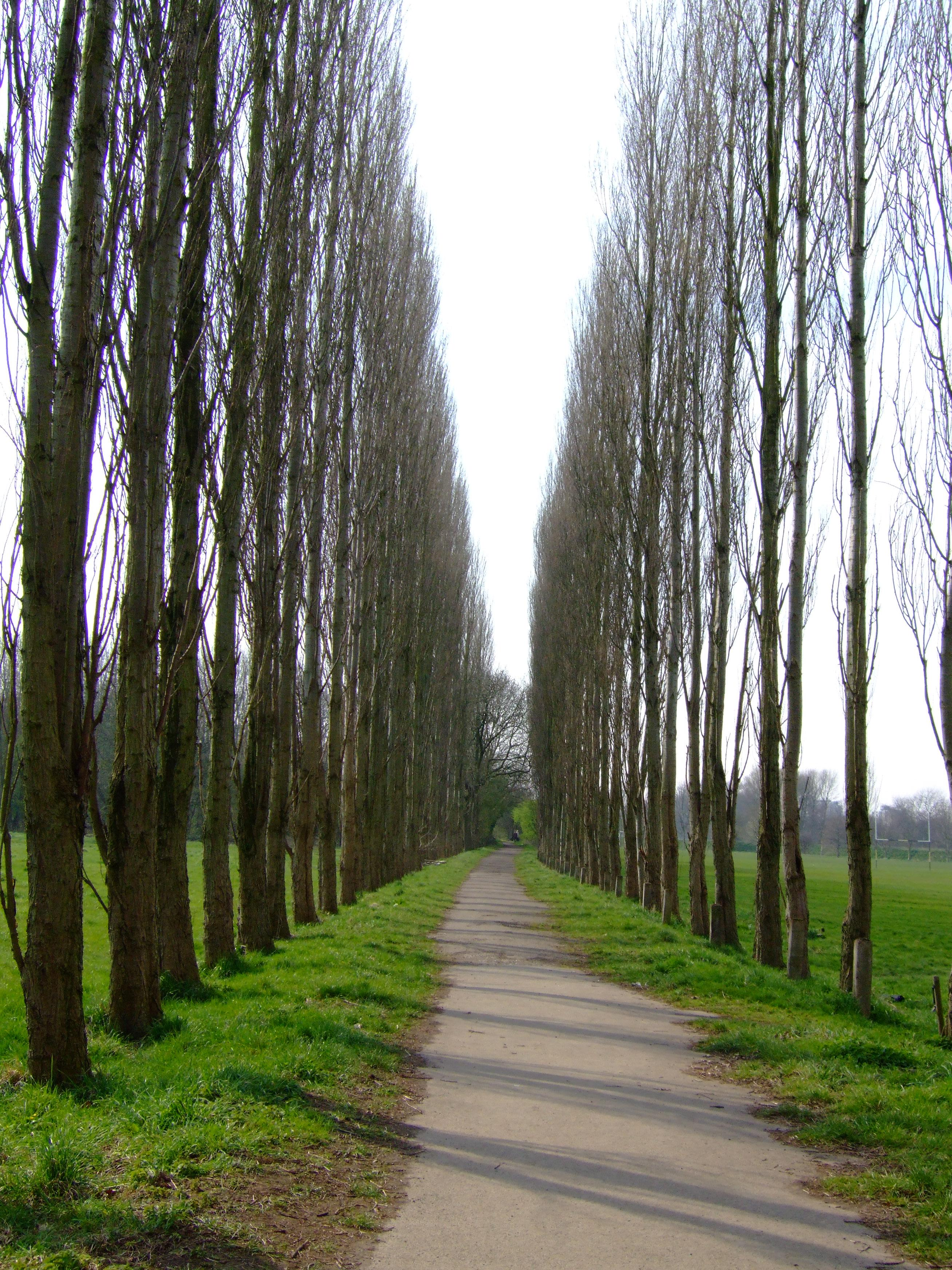
An avenue of poplar trees through Fletcher Moss eventually turns into a path by the River Mersey

The main rock gardens are laid out on a south-facing slope and are sheltered from the elements, allowing a great number of non-hardy species to thrive in a micro-climate. Small waterfalls run down the rock gardens into a pond which is surrounded by royal ferns, marsh marigolds, skunk cabbage, Gunnera ("giant rhubarb") and irises. The gardens contain a wide range of ornamental trees and shrubs, including Chusan palms, tulip trees, mulberry, dawn redwood, swamp cypress, Chinese dogwood, Adam's laburnum, common walnut, Oxydendrum arboreum, and various dwarf conifers.

To the west of the rock gardens, the gardens of the Old Parsonage lie on the other side of Stenner Lane. The entrance to the garden is marked by a neo-Norman stone-arched gate which is topped with a sculpture of an eagle; this was originally a feature on the Spread Eagle Hotel on Corporation Street, Manchester, of which Fletcher Moss was proprietor. When the hotel was demolished in 1902, Moss took the eagle effigy and mounted it on his gate. The Parsonage gardens contain several large yew and cedar of Lebanon trees; beneath one of the yew trees are the graves of several of Alderman Moss's dogs and – reputedly – also the grave of his favourite horse. The Old Parsonage house was open to the public during the 1970s as an art gallery devoted to Manchester art, and the orchid houses were also a visitor attraction; both were closed during the 1980s but after a local campaign the Parsonage opened up in 2012 as a community centre and gallery where there is now a programme of classes, events and exhibitions. The orchid house originally housed a collection of orchids donated by Major Raffles, a resident of Didsbury, but when the heating system broke down there was no funding to replace it and so these plants were moved to Wythenshawe Park. The building which housed the orchids is now an Alpine House – fittingly since there used to be Alpines in the gardens. The gardens are now maintained and cultivated by the Friends of Fletcher Moss Park and Parsonage Gardens, a group of local volunteers.

To the south and west there are water meadows, partially flooded woodland (Stenner Woods) in a former oxbow of the River Mersey and Millgate Fields, a slightly elevated area of fields and woodland in a loop of the River Mersey, surrounding two fields used to graze livestock. This is one of the venues for parkrun UK.

== Awards ==
Fletcher Moss has held the Green Flag Award, the national standard for parks and green spaces in England, since 2000.

== Location ==
Fletcher Moss Gardens are located close to the River Mersey and Stenner Woods, at the southern end of Wilmslow Road where the road curves sharply east at Ye Olde Cock Inn, near Parrs Wood. The gardens can be easily reached by public transport as it lies on the Wilmslow Road bus corridor and is close to East Didsbury railway station.
