= Mrs Pankhurst's Purple Feather =

2018 history book about bird protection

- First edition
- Author: Tessa Boase
- Language: English
- Subject: Etta Lemon
- Genre: Non-fiction
- Publisher: Aurum
- Publication date: 2018
- ISBN: 978-1781316542

Mrs Pankhurst's Purple Feather: Fashion, Fury and Feminism – Women's Fight for Change (republished 2021 as Etta Lemon: The Woman Who Saved the Birds) is a 2018 book by Tessa Boase (Aurum: ISBN 978-1781316542) about Etta Lemon and her campaign against the use of feathers in hat-making (millinery) which led to the foundation of the Royal Society for the Protection of Birds. This campaign is compared and contrasted to Emmeline Pankhurst's campaign for women's suffrage in Britain, which it pre-dated. Ironically Etta Lemon was an anti-suffragist and anti-feminist.

== Title ==
The feather of the title is the one which fell from Emmeline Pankhurst's hat on the day in October 1908 when a group of suffragettes "rushed" the Palace of Westminster, for which she received a three-month prison sentence. The feather is in the collection of the Museum of London.

The 2021 paperback edition of the book was published with the title Etta Lemon: The Woman Who Saved the Birds.

== Origins of the book ==
The author has said that the idea for the book came when she saw a 1913 family photograph in which one of the women wore a hat decorated with two white birds' wings. She wondered: "Who wore hats like this? What did the wings signify? Who had shot the bird, prepared the wings, fastened them to the hat? Were women wearing hats like this in other countries, or was it a peculiarly British thing?", and found that "In investigating the winged hat, I tumbled into a vanished world." In an interview on BBC Radio 4's Woman's Hour she said that the idea for the book came when a male "birdy" friend remarked: "Did you know that the RSPB was founded by Victorian women campaigning against feathered hats?"

== Content ==
In 1880s Britain, plume-hunting was a thriving trade: vast numbers of feathers and whole birds were imported from around the world, used to trim women's hats. An American journalist from The Auk visited an auction sale in 1888 in London and reported that "here was a greater diversity of birds than all the ornithological collections known to him in the United States and the United Kingdom combined". He estimated that he had seen "between 7,000 and 8,000 parrots", 12,000 hummingbirds, and 16,000 packages of "osprey". In the context of millinery, "osprey" meant not the large bird of prey now known by that name, but the "nuptial" or "breeding" plumage of the snowy egret: these birds were shot for this treasured plumage at the season when they had young, so each death left a nest of orphaned chicks. Boase describes the lives and work of the home-workers who prepared feathers for the trade and of the girls who worked in millinery workshops.

Etta Smith (later Lemon) joined other women in the Croydon branch of the Fur, Fin and Feather Folk, which met over afternoon tea at the home of Eliza Phillips. At the same time, in Manchester, Emily Williamson was hosting meetings of the Society for the Protection of Birds. Both groups were founded in 1889, at a time when the British Ornithological Union barred women from membership. The two groups combined after a meeting held at the RSPCA's headquarters, to form the Society for the Protection of Birds (it gained its Royal Charter in 1904), and drew up a constitution under which members agreed to "refrain from wearing the feathers of any bird not killed for the purposes of food, the ostrich excepted" (since ostrich plumes were obtained without killing the bird).

The book describes the ups and downs of the ensuing campaign, drawing comparisons with the fight for women's suffrage (to which Etta Lemon was opposed). During World War I the importation of feathers was banned along with that of other luxury goods. The Plumage Act which had first been presented to Parliament in 1908 was finally passed as the Importation of Plumage (Prohibition) Act in 1921.

Etta Lemon was involved in the SPB from the start, and became Honorary Secretary of what was now the RSPB in 1935, taking on the role from her husband Frank Lemon after his death. She was removed from this post in 1939, at the age of 79, after 50 years of service, being sent a curt note to tell her that her services were no longer required.

== See also ==
- Plume hunting
