= Lympne =

Village in Kent, England

Coordinates: 51.0767°N 1.0289°E

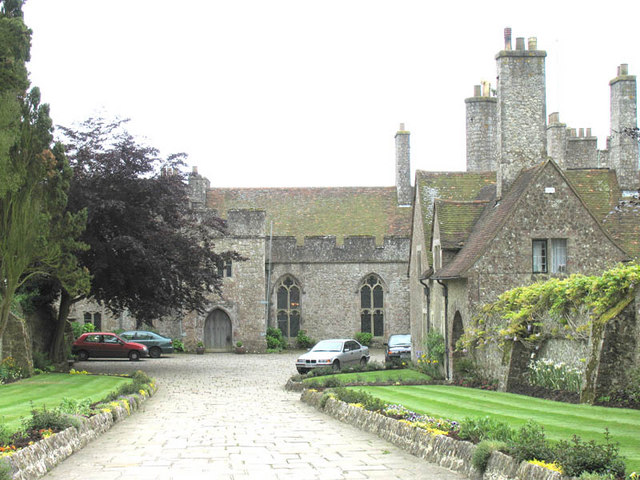
- Lympne Castle

- Location within Kent
- Population: 1,575 (2011)
- OS grid reference: TR121352
- Civil parish: Lympne
- District: Folkestone and Hythe
- Shire county: Kent
- Region: South East
- Country: England
- Sovereign state: United Kingdom
- Post town: HYTHE
- Postcode district: CT21
- Dialling code: 01303
- Police: Kent
- Fire: Kent
- Ambulance: South East Coast
- UK Parliament: Folkestone and Hythe

Lympne (/lɪm/), formerly Lymne, is a village on the former shallow-gradient sea cliffs above the expansive agricultural plain of Romney Marsh in Kent, England. The settlement forms an L shape stretching from Port Lympne Zoo via Lympne Castle facing Lympne Industrial Park then via the main settlement to Newingreen in the north, centred 11 km (7 mi) west of Folkestone, 2.3 mi (3.7 km) west of Hythe and 13 km (8.1 mi) ESE of Ashford.

== History ==
In Roman times, Lympne was known as Portus Lemanis, from which (or from the British eponym of which) the English name is derived in identical written form to one of its Middle English written recorded forms. It lay at the end of the Roman road from Canterbury, known today as Stone Street. It had a Saxon Shore fort and, according to a fifth-century source, was garrisoned by a regiment originally raised in Tournai in northern Gaul. The remains are at the bottom of the south-facing cliffs; they lie in private land but can be visited due to a public footpath crossing the area. In Anglo-Saxon times the fort was given the name "Stutfall", meaning "fold in which a stud, or herd, is kept". One of the oldest houses in the village is The Sanctuary; parts of the building date back to 1774.

From 1923, Lympne Aerodrome was home to the Lympne light aircraft trials and air races. In the 1930s, it was the starting point for several long-distance record flights, including a solo one to Cape Town by Amy Johnson in 1932, and also ones by her later husband Jim Mollison. Jean Batten later flew from Lympne to Darwin, beating Johnson's long-distance record, in 1934. In the post-war years, the world's first air car-ferry service was operated by Silver City Airways between Lympne and Le Touquet. The airport has closed and has become an industrial estate.

== Landmarks ==
Port Lympne Zoo is west of where the older part of Lympne stands. St. Stephen's church, the Church of England parish church of Lympne, is listed in the highest category of listed building and so too 14th and 15th century Lympne Castle founded 'probably in the late 13th century' according to the UK statutory body's experts. Adjacent, these landmarks overlook the Romney Marsh plain including Palmarsh sailing club lake immediately to the south of the steep slope to the south. The church mostly is a late 11th to 14th century in various parts of different centuries between these and was restored including by English architect J.P. St Aubyn, having monuments separately listed in the grounds to the Wooly and Knatchbull families. Margaret Damer Dawson co-founder of the Women's Police Service and Catherine Victoria Hall co-founder of the RSPB are buried together in the churchyard. The castle has an adjoining medieval wellhead. The structure was restored and saw additions in 1907 and 1911–12 by Robert Lorimer, Arts and Crafts Scottish architect.

== Governance ==
Lympne is part of the electoral ward called Lympne and Stanford. The population of this ward at the 2011 Census was 2,004.

=== Amenities ===
Lympne has a village hall, a convenience/grocery shop, a hairdresser and a large pub-restaurant: The County Members.

=== Sports ===
A village football team plays in Kent leagues and trains new sides in the sport: Lympne Village Football Club, LVFC. Neighbouring villages provide other sports, such as cricket in the summer which is played informally in Lympne.

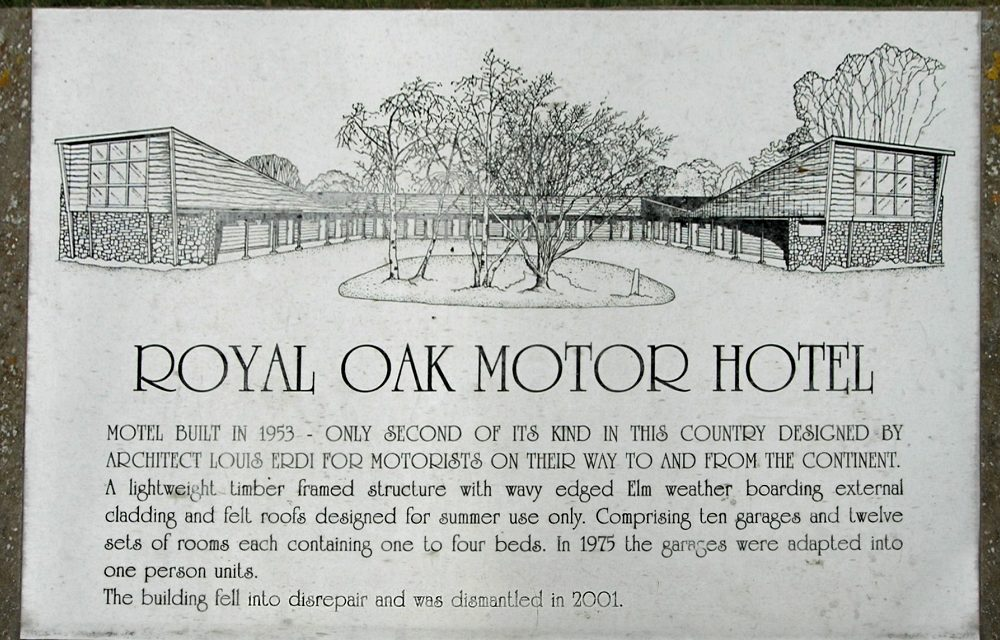
Sign placed at site of Royal Oak Motel

== Transport ==
Lympne straddles the B2067 road from Hythe to Aldington, Hamstreet and Tenterden. The nearest railway station is at Westenhanger.

== In literature, film and the media ==
=== Early 20th century ===
In H. G. Wells's 1901 novel First Men in the Moon, the English narrator Bedford, the sole survivor of the Moon expedition, attempts to land the antigravity sphere anywhere on Earth and has the good fortune to land it on the seashore at Lympne, reasonably close to his departure point. A local boy enters the antigravity sphere without Bedford's permission, and accidentally activates it, sending himself and the sphere into space, never to return.

Lympne was the written and spoken setting of the 1945 David Lean's film production of Noël Coward's play Blithe Spirit, starring Rex Harrison and Margaret Rutherford (filmed in and around Denham, Buckinghamshire).

Lympne Hill figures in the Doctor Syn stories by Russell Thorndike.

In the book Biggles Pioneer Air Fighter by W. E. Johns, this place has an airfield where his Camel is stationed while Biggles is on holiday.
