= Catherine Victoria Hall =

English animal welfare activist

Catherine Victoria Hall (10 June 1838 – 14 September 1924) was an English animal welfare activist. She was the first treasurer of the Royal Society for the Protection of Birds. She was also a supporter of the Women's Police Service and a pioneer of the Homes of Rest for Horses and Dogs at Battersea (now Battersea Dogs & Cats Home).

== Early life ==
Catherine Victoria Hall was born in 1838 in Marylebone, London. Her mother was Lucy Tilden of Ifield Court near Gravesend, Kent and her father was John Robert Hall of Abbots Leigh, Somerset, a parliamentary solicitor. Her brother was Robert Gresley Hall a commercial trader in the City of London, and deputy lieutenant for Tower Hamlets.

== Royal Society for the Protection of Birds ==
When the Society moved to London Catherine was the first Treasurer, alongside Emily Williamson, Eliza Phillips, and Hannah Poland. Hall was likely the near neighbour of Phillips when they both lived in Sutton, London and they are subsequently listed at the same address in Bayswater in the 1891 census. Later "Mrs Phillips provided her house. Her good friend, Miss Catherine Hall, a Bayswater spinster of 50, donated the money".

The first annual report of the Society for the Protection of Birds in 1891 records Miss C.V. Hall as Honorary Treasurer, a position she held until 1895. She remained on the RSPB Committee, as a founder member of the Council, and Vice President, until her death.

"Mrs Phillips … and her close friend, Miss C V Hall of Lancaster Lodge, London, made welcome their numerous friends interested in the protection of wild creatures; in furtherance of this, Mrs Phillips gave unstintingly of her literary ability, and great experience of the world, and Miss Hall of her money and sweet patience, the ultimate outcome being the formation of a Society designed for the protection of Wild Birds throughout the world."

In 1890, the society published its first leaflet, entitled Destruction of Ornamental-Plumaged Birds, aimed at saving the egret population by informing wealthy women of the environmental damage wrought by the use of plumage in hatmaking. A later 1897 publication, Bird Food in Winter, aimed to address the use of berries as winter decoration and encouraged the use of synthetic berries to preserve the birds' food source. By 1898 the RSPB had 20,000 members and in 1897 alone had distributed over 16,000 letters and 50,000 leaflets.

In 1902 "Miss Hall gave an interesting lecture on British birds. The meeting was fairly well attended."

The society received a Royal Charter in 1904.

Catherine was also a Vice President of the Animal Defence & Anti-Vivisection Society, now the Animal Defence Trust.

== Death and legacy ==
Having lived at Little Squerryes in Westerham, Kent for nearly 20 years, Hall retired to Highfield house on Seabrooke Road in Hythe, Kent where she died on 14 September 1924.

Hall left several bequests of around £100 each to friends and family, £50 to the RSPB, and £1,500 to suffragette and far right activist Mary Sophia Allen who also had the use of her house and most of the contents for her lifetime. The joint executors of her will were Mary Allen and Isobel Frances Goldingham, founders of the Women's Police Service with Margaret Damer Dawson. Mary Allen referred to her as "my little old lady" and Isobel Goldingham had "true affection for a dear old friend".

"Although approaching her 80th birthday, her zest was unabated, her energy never flagged. Among all those who upheld the aims and ideals of the Women Police Service none were more constant or generous in their support than the late Miss C V Hall. Aldington Baby Home remained her special concern and was always ready to give - of her time and energy as well as her money - to the work of benevolence which she insisted had provided her with a new interest in life. In one of her letters, full of infectious enthusiasm for the cause she was interested in, she wrote 'This work gives me great pleasure and fresh courage to go on my way rejoicing'".

"News has reached Westerham of the death of Miss C V Hall who left Westerham in 1914. She was a great lover of animals, a supporter of the RSPCA and whilst at Westerham founded the local Band of Mercy. She will be missed by very many friends. Those who knew Miss Hall's kindness of heart and generosity knew how ready she always was to respond to any invitation to do what she could for the good of the people. Her name was synonymous with all that was good, kind & generous. The Reverend Stranger added 'There were two great characteristics possessed by that lady, Catholicity & sympathy. She was ever ready to help and that should be her motto Miss Hall of Little Squerryes, ready to help and through whose kindness I believe our horse trough was erected.'"

Hall's RSPB obituary in Bird Notes and News reads: "Well known to a large circle of animal-lovers for her interest and sympathy on behalf of the animal creation, Miss Catherine Victoria Hall was closely identified for many years with the work of the Royal Society for the Protection of Birds; and her death at Highfield, Hythe on September 14, 1924, removes a gentle and kindly personality held in affectionate regard by all her fellow workers. Though she had reached the age of 86 she remained youthful in spirit to the last. In the first Report issued by the Society, Miss Hall, then of Lancaster Gate, appears as Treasurer, an office she undertook when the first officers were elected in 1891 and held until 1895’.

According to the Kentish Express she was also "the pioneer of the Homes of Rest for Horses and Dogs at Battersea (now Battersea Dogs & Cats Home)", "helped to organise [the Women Police] and in which she took a great interest" and a "pioneer" of the Auxiliary Service. Most of her family, including her nieces and nephew, as well as Mary Sophia Allen attended her funeral.

Hall was buried alongside Margaret Dawson, 35 years her junior, at Lympne, Kent: IN LOVING MEMORY OF HER FRIEND & CO-WORKER CATHERINE VICTORIA HALL.
