= Phyllis Barclay-Smith =

British ornithologist and editor

- Barclay-Smith as editor of the Avicultural Magazine
- Born: Ida Phyllis Barclay-Smith; 18 May 1902
- Died: 2 January 1980 (aged 77); Islington, London, England
- Occupation: Ornithologist
- Honours: Member of the Order of the British Empire, Commander of the British Empire, Order of the Golden Ark

Ida Phyllis Barclay-Smith CBE (18 May 1902 – 2 January 1980) was a British ornithologist and editor of the Avicultural Magazine. She led the International Council of Bird Preservation. In 1958, she became the first woman to receive an MBE for work in conservation, and was made CBE for 1970.

== Biography ==
Phyllis, as she was known, was the second of three daughters of Edward Barclay-Smith and his wife Ida Mary. Edward was a professor of anatomy at Cambridge University. She studied at Blackheath high school and King's College, London and joined as an assistant secretary to the Royal Society for the Protection of Birds (RSPB) in 1924. One of the early founders of the RSPB was her aunt Margaretta Louisa Lemon, known as Etta Lemon.

At the International Ornithological Congress of 1930 Barclay-Smith spoke on oil pollution and sea birds. Jean Delacour who was vice-president of the International Council for Bird Preservation (ICBP) was impressed by her organizational efficiency.

Barclay-Smith resigned from the RSPB in 1935, partly due to being denied the position of secretary after the retirement of Linda Gardiner, a position for which Robert Preston Donaldson was recruited. Etta Lemon believed that a male secretary was needed for the organization to be viewed more seriously and this enraged the secretaries, Barclay-Smith as well as Beatrice Solly. Barclay-Smith then joined the ICBP and worked almost lifelong at the Council, becoming a secretary in 1946 and secretary-general in 1974.

=== War years ===
During World War II, Barclay-Smith worked as a secretary to the business manager of the Bristol Aeroplane Factory and from 1943 to 45 she worked in the Ministry of Labour. Her strengths were in building organizations, ensuring communication, collaboration and participation within and across an international network of scientists, civil servants and politicians.

She helped in bridging aviculturists and ornithologists, serving as editor of the Avicultural Magazine from 1938. She helped establish the International Wildfowl Research Bureau, and helped in raising awareness on insecticide risks. She also helped in rallying support for the establishment of the Cousin Island reserve in the Seychelles, in the Indian Ocean.

Phyllis earned the nickname of the dragon, a nickname which was also shared by her aunt Etta Lemon.

=== Death ===
Barclay-Smith died on 2 January 1980, five days after going into coma following a severe stroke on Christmas Day, 1979, at the Whittington Hospital, Islington, London. She was cremated.

== Honors ==
She was made MBE in 1958 for her services to conservation, CBE for 1970, and awarded Ridder of the Most Excellent Order of the Golden Ark by Prince Bernhard of the Netherlands.

== Selected works ==
Among Barclay-Smith's works were translations of books from French and German.

- British birds on lake, river and stream, 1939
- British and American game birds, 1939
- Garden birds, 1945
- A book of ducks, 1951
- (tr.) The Bird: its life and structure by Gertrud Hess
- (tr.) Birds of the world: their life and habits by Paul Barruel, 1954
- Woodland birds, 1955
- (tr.) Water-birds with webbed feet by Paul Geroudet, 1965
