= Robert Montgomery Martin =

Anglo-Irish civil servant (1801 - 1868)

Colonial Treasurer of Hong Kong
- In office January 1844 – July 1845
- Preceded by: Charles Edward Stuart
- Succeeded by: William Mercer

Personal details
- Born: Circa 1801 Dublin, Ireland
- Died: 6 September 1868 Sutton, Surrey, England
- Occupation: Author, civil servant

Robert Montgomery Martin (c. 1801 – 6 September 1868) was an Anglo-Irish writer and civil servant. He served as Colonial Treasurer of Hong Kong from 1844 to 1845. He was a founding member of the Statistical Society of London (1834), the Colonial Society (1837), and the East India Association (1867).

== Biography ==
=== Early life ===
Robert Montgomery Martin was born in Dublin, Ireland, into a Protestant family, the son of John Martin and Mary Hawkins; and trained as a doctor.

About 1820 he went out to Ceylon, under the patronage of Sir Hardinge Giffard, a friend of his father. Travelling onwards to the Cape of Good Hope, where he arrived in June 1823; he joined the expedition of HMS Leven and HMS Barracouta under William Fitzwilliam Owen, bound for Delagoa Bay. Martin was temporarily appointed assistant surgeon, serving also as botanist and naturalist on the south-east coast of Africa, Madagascar, and Indian Ocean islands.

On 10 November 1824 Martin left the expedition at Mombassa, and by way of Mauritius made his way back to the Cape. Later he set sail for New South Wales returning to India around the end of 1828. He lived there for a year, before sailing back to England in 1830.

=== Writer ===
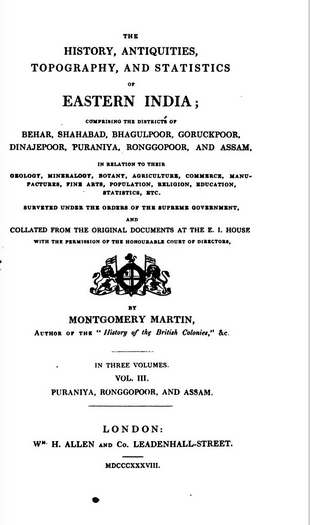
Title page of The history, antiquities, topography, and statistics of eastern India (Vol. III) by Robert Montgomery Martin, published in 1838

Martin became a writer. According to his own account in 1840 he had been studying colonial questions for ten years. He published fifty thousand volumes on India and the colonies. In 1838 he was assigned an office in Downing Street, and in a year brought out his work on the Statistics of the Colonies of the British Empire, compiled from official sources, but without official support. In 1840 he founded and for two years edited the Colonial Magazine.

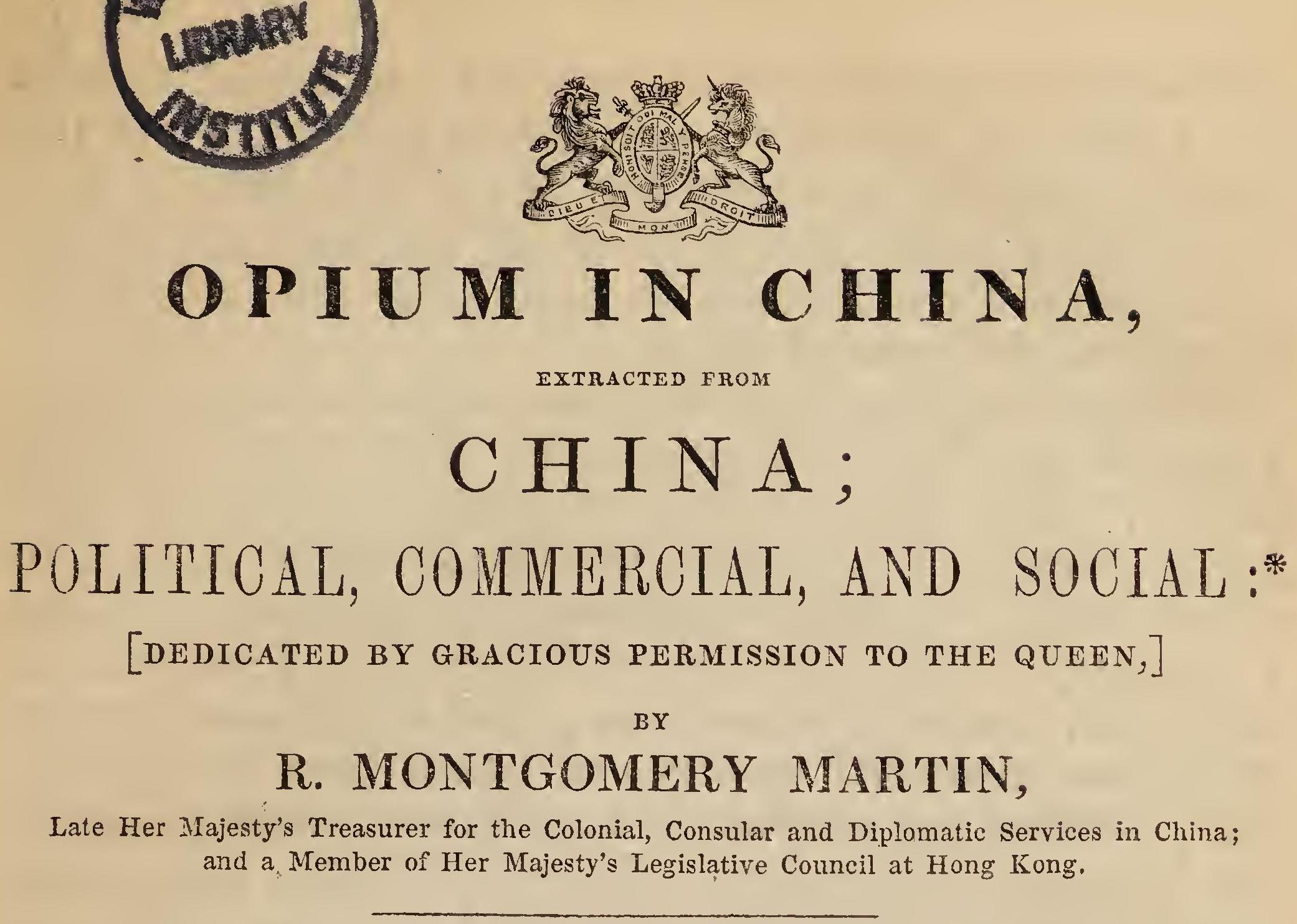
Opium in China, published in 1847

On 5 December 1837 he presented a petition to the House of Commons for an amended colonial administrative department. In 1839, as a member of the court of the East India Company, he was active in promoting the appointment of the commission which sat in 1840 on the East Indian trade. Martin was a prominent witness.

=== Official ===
In January 1844 Martin was appointed treasurer of the newly acquired island of Hong Kong, where he was also a member of the legislative council. He continued to write and was in poor health. In May 1845 he disagreed with the governor about raising revenue from opium and on being refused six months' leave, resigned in July 1845. In his reports he insisted that Hong Kong was as a British colony doomed to failure.

After making unsuccessful efforts to induce the Secretary of State to reinstate him, Martin returned to a literary life, near London. In 1851 he went to Jamaica on a mission to report on the affairs of two mining companies operating there.

=== Family ===
Martin married Jane Avis Frances Keith in 1826. She eloped with Dr. John Sheridan (1805–1858) and emigrated to South Australia, where they were important colonists. In 1847 the marriage was dissolved by Parliament, and he married Eliza Barron, later as Eliza Phillips known in bird welfare.

=== Later life ===
Martin was one of the original members of the East India Association, founded in 1866. He died at Wellesley Lodge, Sutton, Surrey, on 6 September 1868.

== Works ==
The History of the British Colonies was completed in 1831; he obtained an introduction to the king, and on showing his book, received the king's permission to dedicate it to him. It did not appear till 1834, in five volumes:

- Vol I: Possessions in Asia
- Vol II: Possessions in the West Indies
- Vol III: Possessions in North America
- Vol IV: Possessions in Africa and Austral-Asia
- Vol V: Possessions in Europe

In 1837, Martin expanded the work, and published the new edition as The British Colonial Library, in ten volumes:

- Vol I: History, Statistics, and Geography of Upper and Lower Canada
- Vol II: History of Austral-Asia: comprising New South Wales, Van Diemen's Island, Swan River, South Australia, &c.
- Vol III: History of Southern Africa: comprising the Cape of Good Hope, Mauritius, Seychelles, &c.
- Vol IV: History of the West Indies: comprising Jamaica, Honduras, Trinidad, Tobago, Grenada, the Bahamas, and the Virgin Isles.
- Vol V: History of the West Indies: comprising British Guiana, Barbadoes, St. Vincent's, St. Lucia, Dominica, Montserrat, Antigua, St. Christopher's, &c. &c.
- Vol VI: History of Nova Scotia, Cape Breton, the Sable Islands, New Brunswick, Prince Edward Island, the Bermudas, Newfoundland, &c. &c.
- Vol VII: History of the British Possessions in the Mediterranean: comprising Gibraltar, Malta, Gozo, and the Ionian Islands.
- Vol VIII: History of the Possessions of the Honorable East India Company. Vol I.
- Vol IX: History of the Possessions of the Honorable East India Company. Vol II.
- Vol X: History of the British Possessions in the Indian & Atlantic Oceans; comprising Ceylon, Penang, Malacca, Sincapore, the Falkland Islands, St. Helena, Ascension, Sierra Leone, the Gambia, Cape Coast Castle, &c. &c.

Richard Wellesley, 1st Marquess Wellesley entrusted Martin with the preparation of his papers for publication, as The Marquis of Wellesley's Indian Despatches, 5 vols. 1836, and The Marquis of Wellesley's Spanish Despatches, 1840. For some months in 1833–4 he was engaged on the Taxation of the British Empire, working mainly in the library of the House of Commons. He next turned to the records of East India House, and brought out his History of the Antiquities of Eastern India (3 vols.) in 1838.

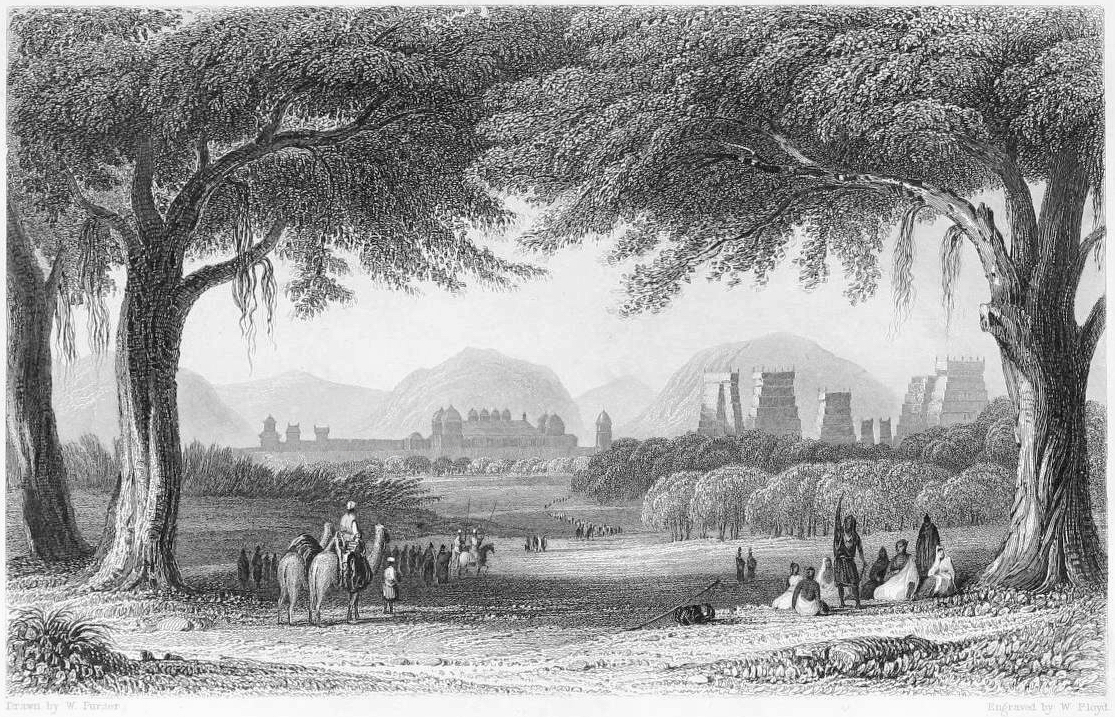
Temples in Madurai, illustration from vol. 3 of Martin's The Indian Empire vol. 3.

Other works were:

- Political, Commercial, and Financial Condition of the Anglo-Eastern Empire, 1832.
- British Relations with the Chinese Empire, 1832.
- Analysis of the Parliamentary Evidence on the China Trade, 1832.
- Ireland as it was, is, and ought to be, 1833.
- Past and Present State of the Tea Trade, 1832.
- East and West India Sugar Duties, 1833.
- Poor Laws for Ireland, a Measure of Justice for England, 1833.
- Analysis of Parliamentary Evidence on the Handloom Weavers, 1834–5.
- Analysis of the Bible (later translated into Chinese), 1836.
- The Colonial Policy of the British Empire, pt. i. Government, 1837.
- The Statistics of the British Colonies, 1839.
- The Monetary System of British India, 1841.
- Ireland before and after the Union, 1844; 2nd edit. in 1848.
- Steam Navigation with Australia, 1847.
- China, Political, Commercial, and Social, 2 vols. 1847.
- Free Trade in Sugar, 1848.
- The Hudson's Bay Territories and Vancouver's Island, 1849.
- The Indian Empire (illustrated), 5 vols. 1857.
- The Rise and Progress of the Indian Mutiny, 1859.
- Sovereigns of the Coorg (pamphlet), 1867.
