= Frances Keith Sheridan =

Australian educator (1812-1882)

Frances Keith Sheridan (1812 – 14 January 1882) was a school mistress in South Australia, remembered for her association with bequests to the University of Adelaide.

== History ==
(Jane Avis) Frances Keith was born in Hammersmith, a daughter of Daniel Keith D.D., of St. Andrew's University, Scotland, and married Montgomery Martin in 1826. She left him for John Sheridan MD (1805 – 17 April 1858), a graduate of Edinburgh University who left the medical profession to take up editorship of the Morning Advertiser, organ of the Society of Licensed Victuallers of London. Martin divorced his wife in 1847; Dr. Sheridan was around that time an inmate of a lunatic asylum. After his release, he emigrated with Frances and their four children to South Australia aboard the Constant, serving without distinction as ship's surgeon. The decision to move may have been influenced by Frances' brother Edward Keith, who was a barrister in Sydney. They arrived in December 1849; in Adelaide he exhibited further erratic behaviour, exacerbated by drink. He secured a position as assistant to Francis Haire (c. 1812–1864), master of Albert House Academy, a boys' college in Angas Street, but may not have lasted long; he died around five years later.

Frances wrote an essay "First impressions of Adelaide", which was published in a newspaper in 1850. She opened a school at the family home "Keith House", 50 MacKinnon Parade, North Adelaide (corner of Provost Street), before 1857; run by her daughters from around 1865.

Her elder son John Beal Sheridan (c. 1833 – 20 March 1906) was a solicitor, a partner with John Bray as Bray & Sheridan; he was author with John Warren Bakewell of the durable The Magistrate's Guide (1879). He married Emma Brown in Adelaide on 17 December 1854. Another son Raymond Sheridan ( – 8 November 1882) was foreman for printer David Gall on 89 King William Street, which he took over in January 1873 and operated as Gall & Sheridan, until being taken over by Scrymgour & Sons of 115 King William Street.

Her younger daughter Violet Laura Sheridan ( – 28 June 1921) married the industrialist Alfred Muller Simpson on 23 August 1888, his second wife.

Her elder daughter Alice Frances Keith Sheridan (c. 1840? 1844? – 25 November 1922) lived all her adult life in "Keith House", the last twenty years or so alone with her dogs, shunning human company. Despite owning considerable wealth, she did not employ any help apart from occasional visits from a gardener, and spent little on herself. She had a genius for languages, having a considerable knowledge of Greek, Hebrew, Latin, French, German, Spanish, Italian and Danish. It was through her knowledge of this last that she was able to publish a book of Hans Christian Andersen stories which had not previously appeared in English.

She left around £30,000 to the Adelaide University, fulfilling an agreement made with her sister Violet that whichever of them survived should enjoy the income from family property in the city ("Globe Chambers" on the corner of Grote Street and Victoria Square), then leave the land and buildings to the University, to be used for the "advancement of medical science, in memory of the late John Sheridan, M.D., of Edinburgh and his wife, Frances Keith Sheridan, daughter of the late Daniel Keith, D.D., of St. Andrew's University, Scotland." Among her papers was a request for the University to take care of the graves of herself and the members of her family in the West Terrace Cemetery. Her trustees and executors were H. Homburg and A. A. Simpson. "Keith House" was left to the North Adelaide Institute, to become in 1925 the Keith Sheridan Institute, and in 1963 became Sheridan Theatre, home of Adelaide Theatre Group. A further bequest was 2,000 to the Royal Adelaide Hospital, for the erection of a kiosk to be operated by the Adelaide Hospital Auxiliary. The building, an octagonal structure with a dome roof, was opened in 1925.

=== Bibliography ===
- Andersen, H. C. (Hans Christian), 1805–1875: Translations from the Danish, trans. A. F. Keith Sheridan; Scrymgour printers, Adelaide 1886.
