= Eliza Phillips =

English animal welfare activist

Eliza Phillips (née Barron; 1823 – 18 August 1916) was an English animal welfare activist and first Vice President of the Royal Society for the Protection of Birds. She was also the RSPB's first publications editor.

== Biography ==
=== Early life and marriage ===
Eliza Barron was born in Wandsworth, Surrey and baptised at the church of St Mary-at-Lambeth on 11 July 1823, the only child of George Barron (c. 1763–1852), a gentleman, and Elizabeth Joanna Barron (née Barron; 1792–1824). Her parents may have been distant cousins. She was probably raised by her maternal grandparents, but little is known of her early life, though she did meet Samuel Taylor Coleridge while living in Highgate in her youth.

On 11 November 1847, she married the historian and author Robert Montgomery Martin after he had his first marriage dissolved by an Act of Parliament. She was widowed in 1868 and her interest in animal welfare began, inspired by witnessing the sufferings of cattle on a sea voyage.

On 16 May 1874 she married the Reverend Edward Phillips (1807–1885). They rented Culverden Castle, Culverden Down, Tunbridge Wells from the Salomons family, where she became the central figure in the local branch of the Society for the Prevention of Cruelty to Animals (later RSPCA).

=== Royal Society for the Protection of Birds ===
After the loss of her second husband in 1885, Phillips made a central contribution to the history of the protection of bird life in Britain. The Society for the Protection of Birds was founded in 1889 in Didsbury, Manchester, and by 1891 had moved to London with Eliza as Vice President. She also became head of publications.

Eliza had been a near neighbour of founding Treasurer Catherine Victoria Hall 25 years earlier in Sutton, Surrey.

There is no evidence of a founding sister organisation called the Fin, Fur and Feather Folk, despite the reference made by Etta Lemon in her RSPB history. “Mrs Edward Phillips' Fin, Fur and Feather afternoons at 11 Morland Road, Croydon, at which she and her close friend, Miss C V Hall of Lancaster Lodge, London, made welcome their numerous friends interested in the protection of wild creatures; in furtherance of this, Mrs Phillips gave unstintingly of her literary ability, and great experience of the world, and Miss Hall of her money and sweet patience, the ultimate outcome being the formation of a Society designed for the protection of Wild Birds throughout the world." Etta was likely referring to a series of publications not directly linked to the RSPB called Fin, Fur, and Feather leaflets first published by Eliza in 1893. Further, Eliza did not move to Croydon until after 1891.

In 1890, the society published its first leaflet, entitled Destruction of Ornamental-Plumaged Birds, aimed at saving the egret population by informing wealthy women of the environmental damage wrought by the use of feathers in fashion. A later 1897 publication, Bird Food in Winter, aimed to address the use of berries as winter decoration and encouraged the use of synthetic berries to preserve the birds food source. By 1898 the RSPB had 20,000 members and in 1897 alone had distributed over 16,000 letters and 50,000 leaflets. The society received a Royal Charter in 1904.

=== Death and legacy ===
Phillips died on 18 August 1916 at her home in Croydon. Even though she was 93, an inquest was held into her sudden death, as she abruptly became ill and died within half an hour, before a doctor could arrive. The inquest determined she died of natural causes.

Phillips made an important contribution to the animal and bird welfare groups of the later 19th century. She left a sizable estate of more than £100,000 (£7.52 million as of 2025), half of which was designated "for the protection of and relief of suffering of beasts and birds" in her will (and half to over 70 named family and friends).

In 2012, the RSPB had over a million members, including over 195,000 youth members, as well as 18,000 volunteers assisting on 200 nature reserves covering almost 130,000 hectares, home to 80% of the UK's rarest or most threatened bird species.

There is no known picture of Phillips and no known residence remains. There is a plaque recognising her life on the original Culverden Castle entrance pillars on Culverdon Down road, although the castle no longer exists (the incorrect birth date on the plaque was corrected in 2022). In 2025 a panel was unveiled by Croydon Council and RSPB Croydon Local Group on the site of 22 Morland Road.

Phillips left Vaughan House to the Church Commissioners for the use of the minister of St Martins church in Morland Road. The house, along with adjacent properties including Gordon House next door at 24 Morland Road, was demolished and replaced in 1967 by four tower blocks, only one of which remains on Gordon Crescent.

Phillips also made provision in her will to build a clock tower for St Martin's Church opposite Vaughan House on the corner of Stretton Road. It was completed in 1922 and demolished with the church in 1995.

She was buried in the same grave as her father in Brompton Cemetery on 23 August 1916 - grave M/168/67 - however she is not included in the Royal Parks list of famous graves in Brompton Cemetery.
