= Statistics of the Colonies of the British Empire =

Work by Robert Montgomery Martin

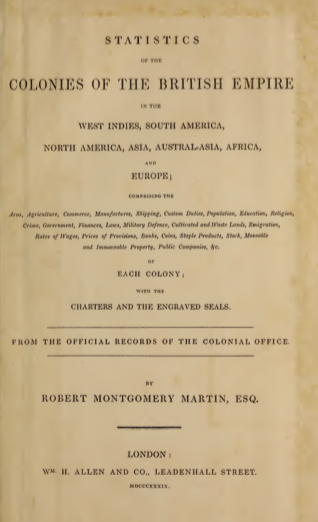
- Author: Robert Montgomery Martin
- Language: English
- Subject: Colonies; Statistics
- Published: 1839 (W. H. Allen & Co.)
- Publication place: United Kingdom of Great Britain and Ireland
- Media type: Print (Hardback)
- Pages: 943
- OCLC: 719996715

Statistics of the Colonies of the British Empire (or more completely, Statistics of the Colonies of the British Empire in the West Indies, South America, North America, Asia, Austral-Asia, Africa, and Europe) is a work by Robert Montgomery Martin which comprises a number of different statistics to measure the well-being of the British Colonies in the late 18th until mid 19th century. It was first published in 1839 by W. H. Allen & Co. roughly a year after it was commenced in February 1838.

The book was published in Royal Octavo (10" by 6¼") and contains roughly 1000 pages, arranged in double columns. In 1839, the book costed £2. 2s. which is approximately £233 in 2018.

== Background ==
Featured in the preface of the book, it is reported that in 1836-7, the Committee of the House of Commons wanted to know about the financial conditions of the colonies and thus wanted to compile the colonial Blue Book into a form suitable for publication.

Due to time and expenditure (it was estimated to cost about £10,000) the initiative was abandoned by the British Empire. Martin, who at that time was a founding member of the Statistical Society of London (1834), decided to take it upon himself to compile the blue books from all the British Colonies of the time.

The Blue books consist of three blank books that were sent to the colonies each year so to be filled in where two of them were returned to Downing Street and another remained in the possession of the colony's Governor.

In order to do that, he wrote a letter to Sir George Grey who was at the time the Under-Secretary of State for the Colonies, stating his request to access the blue books for this project which he completed using his own expenses and without official assistance.

Martin received permission from Lord Glenelg, the Secretary of State for War and the Colonies at the time, to access the blue books and other statistical information regarding the colonies. He was then given his own office in Downing Street to complete the book with his assistant, Frederick Medley. Around 250 volumes of the blue books and a number of various documents were examined and sorted out into a book fit for publication, a which that took him roughly a year to finish.

Stated in the preface, his motivation for compiling the blue books was not only to help measure the decline or progress of the colonies but to also compile it in a way that would bring about the feeling of pride amongst the citizens of Britain. This was in line with Martin's interest which was colonialism as can be seen in his other publications that mostly touched on the topic of the British Colonies. In 1840, he founded and became the editor of the Colonial Magazine and Commercial Maritime Journal.

== Content ==
=== Front page and Introduction ===
The front page of the book started off with a Map of the Colonial Possessions of Great Britain, dated in 1838. Areas within the British Empire were coloured in pink. Martin claimed in the preface report that the map was attached by Mr. Wyld, the Queen’s geographer. In the next section is an overview of the statistics of the colonies, followed by the preface which was named “Report” as well as the index. Next comes the seals of the colonies of the British Empire, designed by Mr. Wyon, the chief engraver of the Royal Mint. Stated in the preface, Martin claimed that it was the first time that the seals were shown to the public. His 1843 reprint of History of the Colonies of the British Empire contained exactly the same front page and introduction, claiming that it was the first time that the seals were publicly shown even though they had been shown before in 1838. The book was also printed by the same publisher, W. H. Allen & Co.

=== Structure ===
The book is arranged into chapters geographically where one colony refers to one chapter. The chapters are further divided into numbered sections according to the general structure of general information, economics, and culture. The different categories in the sections include area, population, commerce, education, religion, etc. The seven chapters that comprised half of the book is arranged as follows:

- Book 1: West Indies
- Book 2: South America
- Book 3: North America
- Book 4: Asia
- Book 5: Austral-Asia
- Book 6: Africa
- Book 7: Europe

The other half of the book houses the appendix which is also separated by colonies beginning with the West Indies and ending with Europe. The appendix consists of statistics what supports Martin's claims and descriptions made in the corresponding sections. The information presented in the appendix differs geographically.

The West Indies appendix features the general trade of each islands including exports to England and duties on sugar, coffee, and rum, and the prices of tropical produce. There are also reports in regards to population and culture such as the report of disease and death rate of the West Indies as well as the education status amongst emancipated African slaves whose children were given education through schools established by the missionaries.

In the North America appendix there are several important statements in relation to the land acquired in Canada after the British gained a vast amount of land in Eastern Canada from France via the Treaty of Paris (1763).

== Other editions ==
The Statistics is not one of a kind but rather was derived from other books that was also written by Martin. In the early 1830s, Martin took it upon himself to write and stress on the importance and value of the British colonies to the public. In 1834, the published the book History of the British Colonies in 5 volumes. While the book was well received, Martin was faced with a complaint that it was expensive. He condensed the 5-volume books into one volume and published it under the name British Colonial Library. The new version contained the same material with a few statistical pages omitted. It was also cheaper and more suited for the masses. The Statistics contains similar textual information as the aforementioned two books but is more statistically dense.
