= Robert Wood Williamson =

British solicitor and anthropologist

Robert Wood Williamson (1856 – 12 January 1932) was a British solicitor and anthropologist.

== Life ==
Robert Wood Williamson was born in Manchester in 1856, the son of Prof. William Crawford Williamson of Owens College. His mother was Sophia Wood daughter of Sarah Batson of Wortley and Robert Wood, Methodist Minister. He was educated at private schools and Owens College before studying law at Clement's Inn, where he was prizeman in his law final examinations in 1877.

From 1879 to 1908 he worked as a Manchester solicitor. In 1882 he married Emily Williamson, co-founder of the Royal Society for the Protection of Birds. He was president of Manchester Law Society, and a Member of the council of the London Law Society in 1902. From 1903 to 1910 he was a member of the Court of Governors of Victoria University of Manchester.

Turning to anthropology at the age of 54, Williamson travelled in the Solomon Islands and took part in an anthropological expedition into the interior of British New Guinea in 1910. He was honorary treasurer of the Royal Anthropological Institute (RAI) from 1912 to 1921, member of council for the RAI from 1922 to 1924, vice-president from 1925 to 1927, and again a member of council from 1928 to 1931.

He died at his home near Godalming on 12 January 1932.

== Works ==
- The Mafulu Mountain People of British New Guinea, London: Macmillan, 1912. With an introduction by A. C. Haddon.
- The Ways of the South Sea Savage: a record of travel & observation amongst the savages of the Solomon Islands & primitive coast & mountain peoples of New Guinea, London: Seeley, Service & Co., 1914.
- The Social and Political Systems of Central Polynesia, Cambridge: Cambridge University Press, 1924
- Religious and Cosmic Beliefs of Central Polynesia, Cambridge: Cambridge University Press, 1933
- Religion and Social Organization in central Polynesia, Cambridge: Cambridge University Press, 1937. Ed. by Ralph Piddington, with an introduction by Raymond Firth.
- Essays in Polynesian Ethnology, Cambridge: Cambridge University Press, 1939. Ed. by Ralph Piddington.
