= Importation of Plumage (Prohibition) Act 1921 =

Act of the Parliament of the United Kingdom

Importation of Plumage (Prohibition) Act 1921 (Note: Section 4(1).)
- Act of Parliament
- Parliament of the United Kingdom
- Long title: An Act to prohibit the importation of Plumage.
- Citation: 11 & 12 Geo. 5. c. 16
- Introduced by: Lord Avebury (Lords)
- Territorial extent: United Kingdom

Dates
- Royal assent: 1 July 1921
- Commencement: 1 April 1922 (Note: Section 4(2).)
- Repealed: 3 February 1977 (Note: The Endangered Species (Import and Export) Act 1976 (Commencement) Order 1977 (SI 1977/24).)
Other legislation
| Amended by | Statute Law Revision Act 1950; Customs and Excise Act 1952 |
| Repealed by | Endangered Species (Import and Export) Act 1976 |

Status: Repealed

Text of statute as originally enacted

The Importation of Plumage (Prohibition) Act 1921 (11 & 12 Geo. 5. c. 16), also known also as the Plumage Act 1908, was an act of the Parliament of the United Kingdom passed in 1921. It had been proposed to the UK Parliament in 1908 as the Plumage Bill and was the subject of determined campaigning by the Royal Society for the Protection of Birds. Large amounts of plumage (birds' feathers) had been used to decorate women's hats, and a campaign against this "Murderous millinery" had been waged since the 1880s.

== History ==
The bill was presented to the House of Lords in 1908 by Lord Avebury, and was passed by the Lords on 21 July. It was read in the House of Commons the next day, but did not proceed because of a lack of time. It came to the Commons again in 1913, had two readings, and was again set aside, apparently because of "trade interests". Gertrude Ansell, a 52-year-old businesswoman and suffragette, reacted by smashing a window of the Home Office as a protest and was jailed for a month. During the First World War, feathers were among the luxury items whose import was banned in February 1917, but only for the duration of the war.

In July 1919, Etta Lemon and the Duchess of Portland delivered a letter signed by 150 men, including celebrities such as H. G. Wells and Thomas Hardy, to the president of the Board of Trade, Sir Auckland Geddes, asking that the war-time restriction on the importation of plumage should be continued until legislation was passed. Geddes replied that the import restriction would continue "as long as possible" and that he "hoped" that the bill would be passed early in 1920.

In July 1920, Henry William Massingham, editor of The Nation, wrote a column about the bill's lack of success, pointing out that the much-prized egret feathers were obtained by shooting birds that had chicks on their nests, and asking "But what do women care? Look at Regent Street this morning". This provoked Virginia Woolf to write a strong piece, published in the Woman's Leader, in which she painted pictures of the crowds of feather-wearing ladies in Regent Street and of the cruelty of the slaughter of the birds, but pointed out that it was men who were the bird-hunters and men who were 66 of the 67 members of Standing Committee C which had on five occasions failed to produce a quorum of 20 members for a discussion of the bill. "The Plumage Bill is for all practical purposes dead. But what do men care?".

When Nancy Astor took her seat in the Commons in December 1919, she took up the cause of the Plumage Bill and a parliamentary group was formed to support it; the bill passed into law on 1 July 1921. Although it forbade the import of plumage, it did not control the sale or wearing of it, and Etta Lemon wrote in the RSPB annual report that "It is impossible to say that the Act is a wholly satisfactory one".

The act was the subject of debate in the House of Lords in May 1928, following a proposal to amend it. It was further debated in the Commons in March 1936, when it was alleged, and disputed, that bird skins were still being smuggled into the country, and on several other occasions.

Importation of Plumage (No. 1) Order 1922
- Statutory Rules and Orders
- Parliament of the United Kingdom
- Citation: SR&O 1922/275

Dates
- Made: 25 March 1922
- Commencement: 25 March 1922
Other legislation
| Made under | Importation of Plumage (Prohibition) Act 1921 |

Text of statute as originally enacted

Importation of Plumage (No. 2) Order 1922
- Statutory Rules and Orders
- Parliament of the United Kingdom
- Citation: SR&O 1922/613

Dates
- Made: 12 June 1922
- Commencement: 12 June 1922
Other legislation
| Made under | Importation of Plumage (Prohibition) Act 1921 |

Text of statute as originally enacted

Importation of Plumage (No. 1) Order 1923
- Statutory Rules and Orders
- Parliament of the United Kingdom
- Citation: SR&O 1923/746

Dates
- Made: 30 June 1923
- Commencement: 30 June 1923
Other legislation
| Made under | Importation of Plumage (Prohibition) Act 1921 |

Text of statute as originally enacted

Importation of Plumage (No. 2) Order 1923
- Statutory Rules and Orders
- Parliament of the United Kingdom
- Citation: SR&O 1923/1496

Dates
- Made: 5 December 1923
- Commencement: 1 January 1924
Other legislation
| Made under | Importation of Plumage (Prohibition) Act 1921 |

Text of statute as originally enacted

Importation of Plumage (No. 1) Order 1925
- Statutory Rules and Orders
- Parliament of the United Kingdom
- Citation: SR&O 1925/1238

Dates
- Made: 10 December 1925
- Commencement: 10 December 1925
Other legislation
| Made under | Importation of Plumage (Prohibition) Act 1921 |

Text of statute as originally enacted

Section 4(3) of the act was repealed by section 1(1) of, and the first schedule to, the Statute Law Revision Act 1950 (14 Geo. 6. c. 6), which came into force on 23 May 1950.

It was suspended by the Import of Goods (Control) (Amendment) Order 1954 (SI 1954/627).

The whole act was repealed by section 13 of the Endangered Species (Import and Export) Act 1976, which came into force on 3 February 1977.
