= Emily Williamson =

English philanthropist and co-founder of RSPB

- Emily Williamson
- Born: Emily Bateson; 17 April 1855; Highfield, Lancaster, England
- Died: 12 January 1936 (aged 80); Kensington, London, England
- Occupation: Environmentalist
- Known for: Society for the Protection of Birds
- Spouse: Robert Wood Williamson (m. 1882–1932)

Emily Williamson (née Bateson; 17 April 1855 – 12 January 1936), was an English philanthropist. She was founder of the Society for the Protection of Birds. which was granted 'Royal' status in 1904. In 1891 she also established the Gentlewomen's Employment Association in Manchester.

== Personal life ==
Emily Bateson was born at Highfield, Lancaster, in April 1855. She was the daughter of Frederick Septimus Bateson and Eliza Frost. She settled in Didsbury after her marriage on 8 June 1882 to Robert Wood Williamson, where they lived until their relocation to The Copse, Brook, Surrey, in 1912. When Robert died in 1932, Emily moved to London where she remained for the rest of her life. She died at home in Kensington on 12 January 1936, aged 80. The couple did not have any children.

== Royal Society for the Protection of Birds ==
Williamson disapproved of the use of bird feathers in fashion, both due to the reduction of bird population and the cruelty of plume hunting. In February 1889 she founded the Society for the Protection of Birds, a group of women who pledged not to wear feathers from most birds. Explicit exceptions included birds killed for food and the ostrich, because the harvesting of its tail feathers was not painful. The society later became the Royal Society for the Protection of Birds in 1904.

The early efforts of the Society were lauded in the press, including an endorsement in Punch in October 1889, although Punch questioned the degree of restriction imposed by the group: "Not a very severe self-denying ordinance that, Ladies?" In 1891 the headquarters was moved to London. Hannah Poland took over from Williamson as secretary, and Winifred, the Duchess of Portland became president. Williamson took a vice-presidency which she would retain until her death. She also continued to serve as secretary in various branches through most of the rest of her life, according to where she lived: in Didsbury (1891–1911), Brook, Surrey (1912–1931), and London (1931 – ca. 1934).

In the period from 1891 to 1899, membership expanded from 1,200 to over 20,000. Among the membership, once men were included, was William Henry Hudson. In 1904, the Royal Society for the Protection of Birds was incorporated by Royal Charter, and the group began charging membership fees. That year was the only one in which Williamson spoke at an annual meeting, reflecting on the growth of the organization from "when it was a very small fledgling, and had no dreams of soaring to the heights which it had reached".

The historical work Mrs Pankhurst's Purple Feather covers the personalities of those involved in the early days of the (R)SPB.

== Work in Education and Employment ==
In 1891, she had founded the Gentlewomen's Employment Association in Manchester, and she also initiated two influential programmes from within this group: the Princess Christian Training College for Nurses and, in 1898, the Loan Training Fund, which helped to subsidise the costs of further education for young women. Although it is believed that records of these organisations no longer exist, the Loan Training Fund was said to have been the first of its kind in the country.

== Posthumous recognition ==
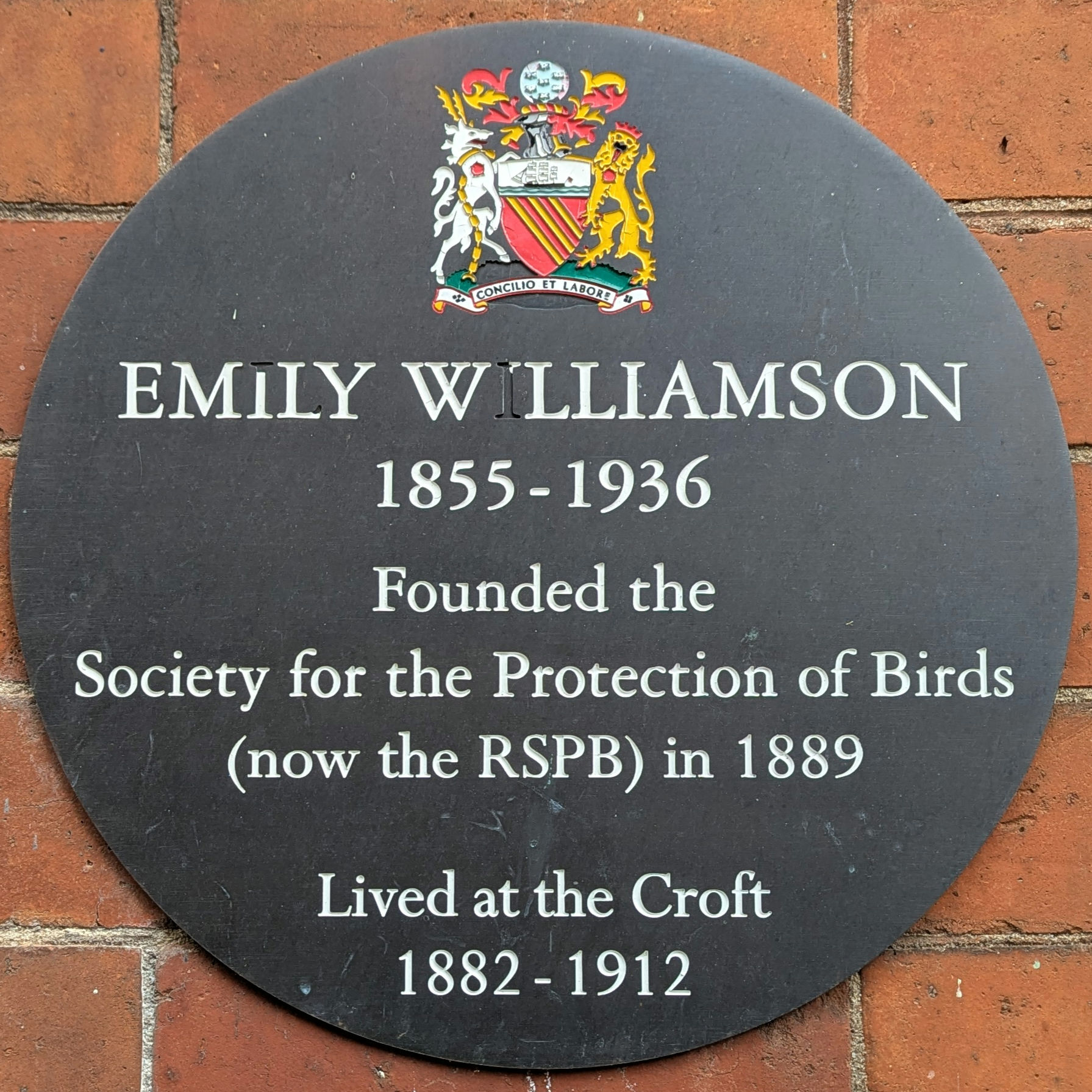
A plaque at Fletcher Moss Botanical Garden commemorating Emily Williamson

The home in which she lived in Didsbury and from which she established her organisation, bears a plaque, which was placed in 1989, to honour her work on the centenary of her organisation.

On 16 April 2023, a plaque honouring Williamson was unveiled in her birthplace in Lancaster by her great, great niece, zoologist and ornithologist Professor Melissa Bateson. A statue of Williamson is due to be unveiled near her former home in Didsbury's Fletcher Moss Botanical Garden.
