= Hannah Poland =

English bird conservationist

Hannah Poland (later Lemel; 18 May 1873 - 16 February 1942) was the first Honorary Member of the Royal Society for the Protection of Birds (SPB).

== Biography ==
The first SPB annual report in 1891 records Poland as having “previously shewn [sic] an active interest in the work." As secretary when the first membership cards were issued, hers was the first address for the Society in London - 29 Warwick Road (now Warwick Avenue, London), Maida Hill.

Newspapers reporting on the first annual report of the SPB in 1891 state that “Hannah Poland of Warwick Rd Maida Vale is secretary, is doing some very useful work”. The following year further newspapers report “Miss Hannah Poland, who had taken over the secretaryship from Mrs. Williamson, was succeeded by Mrs. F. E. Lemon”. Her RSPB obituary notes that the original register of members of 15 November 1889, handwritten by Hannah Poland, was left to the RSPB by her son when she died. In 1905 she became the first Honorary Member of the RSPB “In recognition of her work for the cause of bird protection in the early days”. Her obituary continues: "Records of the early work of the Bird Protection Society show what a devoted and untiring secretary Miss Poland proved herself to be. It was at her solicitation that Winifred Cavendish-Bentinck, Duchess of Portland, became President of the Society in 1891, and it is noteworthy that the membership role increased very considerably during the two years of her secretaryship."

Having married Isidor Lemel in 1906, Hannah died at home at 17 Hallswelle Road in north London on 16 February 1942 leaving a few personal items to family and friends, including a presentation copy of Birds and Man by William Henry Hudson to her sister Esther, and everything else to her only child, Sidney Lemel, except for a framed black and white drawing of an original membership card which she left to the RSPB.

Hannah is buried with her husband in Willesden Jewish Cemetery.
