= Royal Society for the Protection of Birds =

British charitable conservation organisation

- Formation: 1889, Fletcher Moss Botanical Garden, Manchester
- Type: Conservation charity
- Headquarters: The Lodge, Sandy, Bedfordshire, England; 2 Lochside View, Edinburgh, Scotland
- Region served: United Kingdom; British Overseas Territories
- President: Dr Amir Khan
- Key people: Kevin Cox (Chairman); Beccy Speight (Chief Executive)
- Revenue: ▲£157.7 million GBP (2022)
- Staff: 2,231 (2022)
- Volunteers: 10,500 (2022)
- Website: rspb.org.uk

The Royal Society for the Protection of Birds (RSPB) is a charitable organisation in the United Kingdom. Founded in 1889, the Society works to promote conservation and protection of birds and the wider environment through public awareness campaigns, petitions and through the operation of over 200 reserves throughout the United Kingdom. It operates across England, Scotland, Wales and Northern Ireland, as well as the British Overseas Territories. It is registered in England and Wales and in Scotland.

In 2023/24 the RSPB had revenue of £169 million, 2,517 employees, 13,500 volunteers and 1.1 million members (including 195,000 youth members), making it one of the world's largest wildlife conservation organisations. The RSPB has many local groups.

== History ==
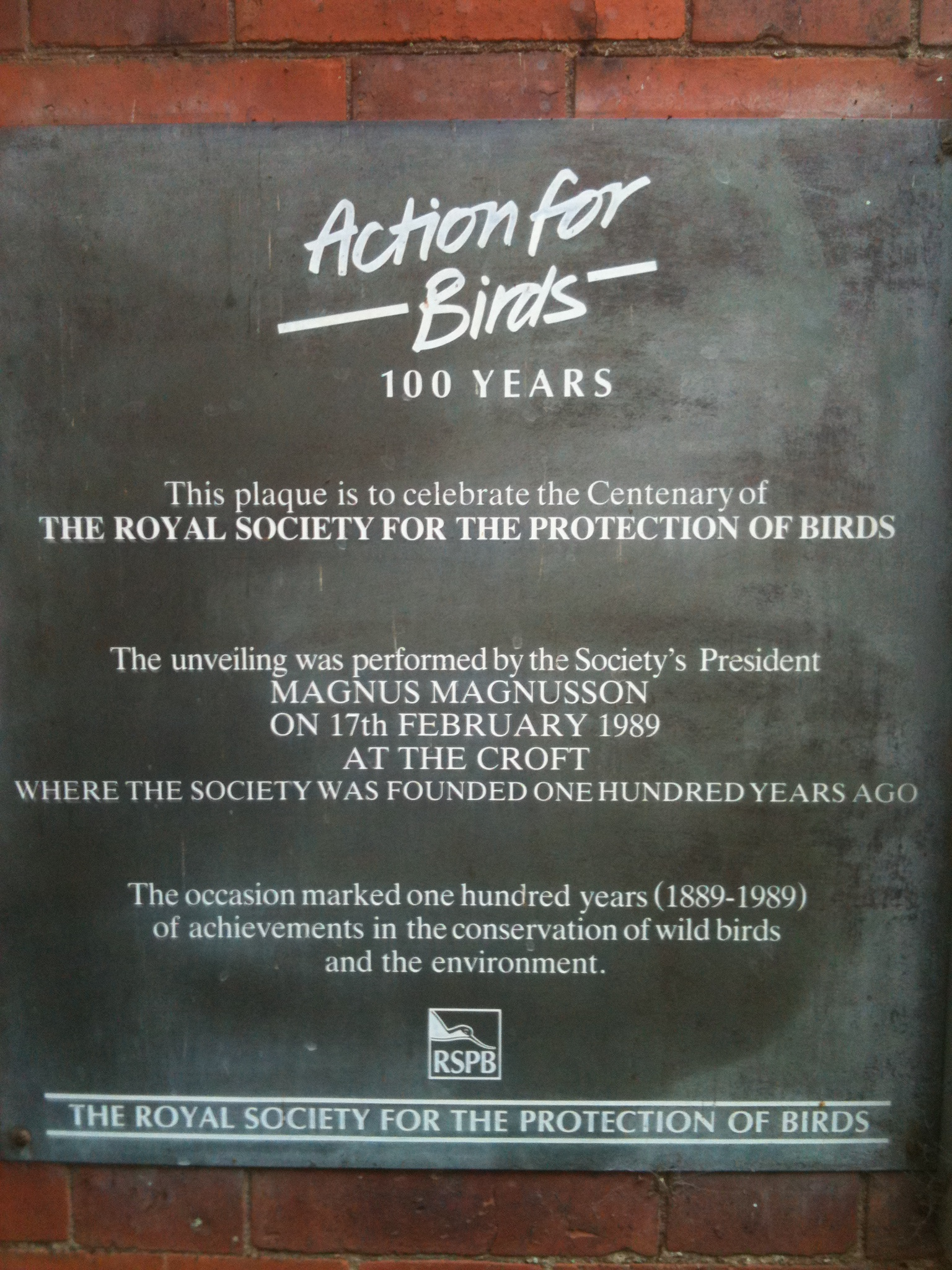
Plaque at Fletcher Moss Park, Manchester, commemorating the foundation of the RSPB

The Society for the Protection of Birds was founded in February 1889 by Emily Williamson at her house in Didsbury, Manchester, as a protest group campaigning against the use of great crested grebe and kittiwake skins and feathers in fur clothing. The house is now in Fletcher Moss Botanical Garden.

By May 1891, when Hannah Poland succeeded Emily as Honorary Secretary, the SPB had moved to London. Hannah is widely quoted as being responsible for the appointment of the Duchess of Portland as the first President in 1891, with Eliza Phillips as Vice President and Catherine Victoria Hall as Treasurer. Eliza later began writing a series of Fin, Fur and Feather leaflets which never appeared as SPB publications, but resulted in an assumption that this was a sister organisation.

The first SPB Annual Report was published in November 1891.

In 1893 Etta Lemon was appointed Honorary Secretary, succeeding Hannah Poland. Etta had earlier been listed in the first Annual Report as one of fifty local secretaries.

The Society gained its Royal Charter in 1904.

Hannah Poland became the first Honorary Member of the RSPB in 1905 "in recognition of her work for the cause of bird protection in the early days".

The original members of the SPB were all women who campaigned against the fashion of the time for women to wear exotic feathers in hats, and the consequent encouragement of "plume hunting". To this end the Society had two simple rules:

- That Members shall discourage the wanton destruction of Birds, and interest themselves generally in their protection
- That Lady-Members shall refrain from wearing the feathers of any bird not killed for purposes of food, the ostrich only excepted.

At the time of founding, the trade in plumage for use in hats was very large: in the first quarter of 1884, almost 7,000 bird-of-paradise skins were being imported to Britain, along with 400,000 birds from West India and Brazil, and 360,000 birds from East India.

In November 1890, Eliza Phillips had published a leaflet entitled Destruction of Ornamental-Plumaged Birds, aimed at saving the egret population by informing wealthy women of the environmental damage wrought by the use of feathers in fashion. This leaflet is considered to have later become the first in a series of official SPB publications.

A 1897 publication, Bird Food in Winter, aimed to address the use of berries as winter decoration and encouraged the use of synthetic berries to preserve the birds food source. In 1897 the SPB distributed over 16,000 letters and 50,000 leaflets and by 1898 had 20,000 members.

The Society attracted support from some women of high social standing who belonged to the social classes that popularised the wearing of feathered hats, including the Duchess of Portland and the Ranee of Sarawak. As the organisation began to attract the support of many other influential figures, both male and female, such as the ornithologist Professor Alfred Newton, it gained in popularity and attracted many new members.

The Society received a Royal Charter in 1904 from Edward VII, just 15 years after its founding, and was instrumental in petitioning the Parliament of the United Kingdom to introduce laws banning the use of plumage in clothing.

At the time that the Society was founded in Britain, similar societies were also founded in other European countries. In 1961, the society acquired The Lodge in Sandy, Bedfordshire, as its new headquarters. The RSPB's logo depicts an avocet. The first version was designed by Robert Gillmor.

== Activities ==
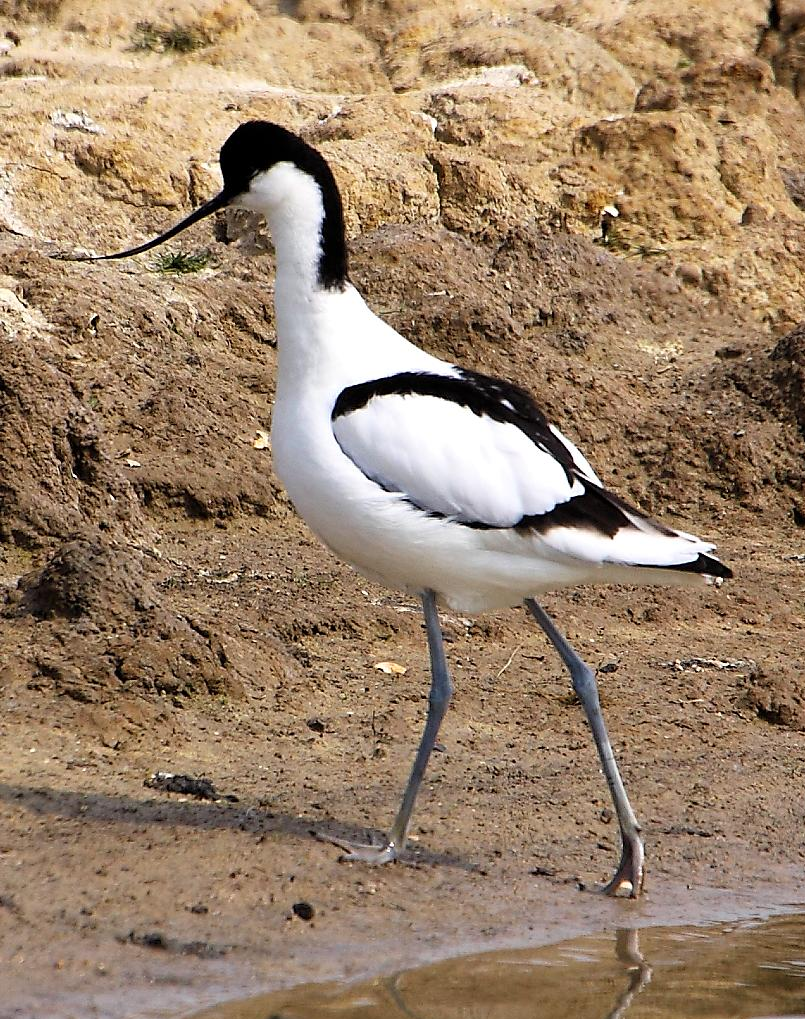
An avocet at the RSPB's Minsmere reserve. This species is used in the RSPB's logo.

Today, the RSPB works with both the civil service and the Government to advise Government policies on conservation and environmentalism. It is one of several organisations that determine the official conservation status list for all birds found in the UK.

The RSPB does not run bird hospitals nor offer animal rescue services.

The RSPB entered into a partnership with UK housebuilder Barratt Developments in 2014.

=== Reserves and other properties ===
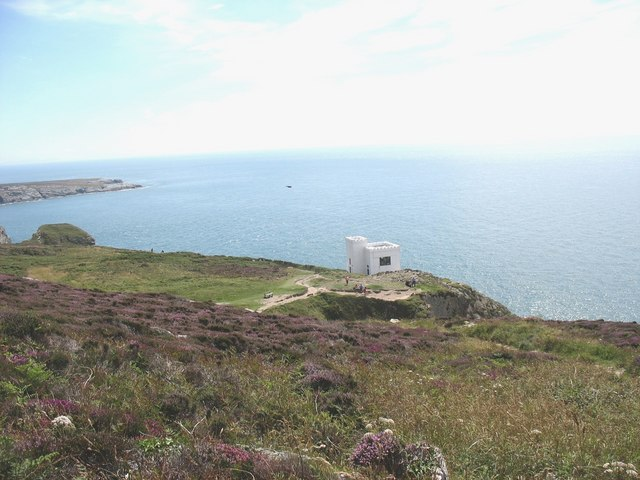
South Stack reserve, Anglesey, with Ellin's Tower, housing a visitor centre

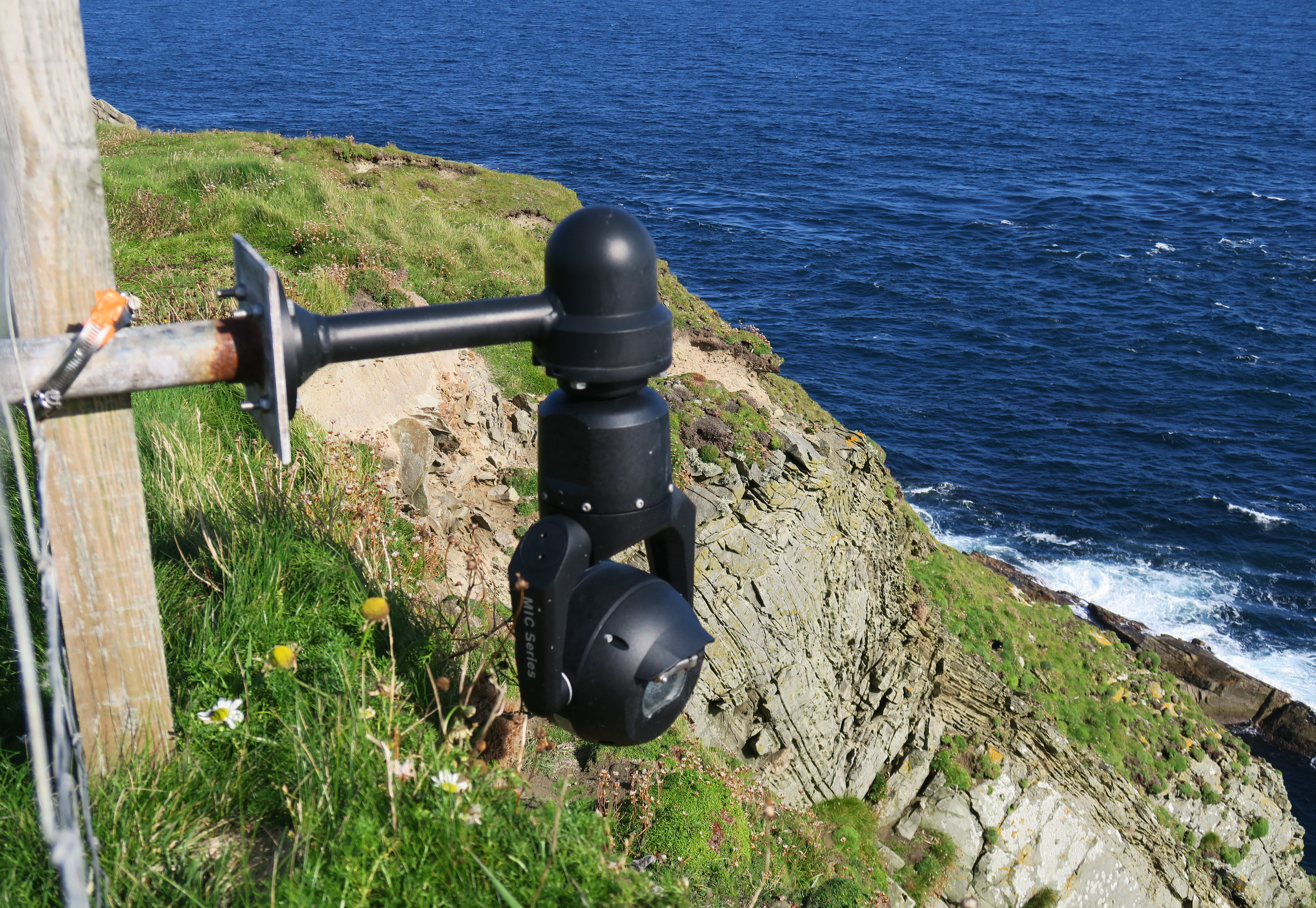
A webcam installed near Sumburgh Head lighthouse, Shetland. The cliffs are home to large numbers of seabirds and the area is an RSPB nature reserve.

As of 2026 the RSPB maintains 226 reserves throughout the United Kingdom, covering a wide range of habitats, from estuaries and mudflats to forests and urban habitats. The reserves often have bird hides provided for birdwatchers and many provide visitor centres, which include information about the wildlife that can be seen there.

Hope Farm in Cambridgeshire is a 181 hectares (450 acres) farm operated by contractors on behalf of the RSPB and acquired around 2000. The farm operates commercially but also aims to showcase bird-friendly farming practice.

=== Awards ===
The RSPB confers awards, including the President's Award, for volunteers who make a notable contribution to the work of the society.

==== RSPB Medal ====
According to the RSPB:

The RSPB Medal is the Society's most prestigious award. It is presented to an individual in recognition of wild bird protection and countryside conservation. It is usually awarded annually to one or occasionally two people.

=== Magazines ===
The RSPB has published a members-only magazine for over a century.

==== Bird Notes ====
Bird Notes
- Cover of Autumn 1946 issue of Bird Notes, Vol. 23, No. 3
- Discipline: Ornithology
- Language: English

Publication details
- History: 1903–1966
- Publisher: RSPB (United Kingdom)

Standard abbreviations
- ISO 4: Bird Notes

Indexing
- ISSN: 0406-3392

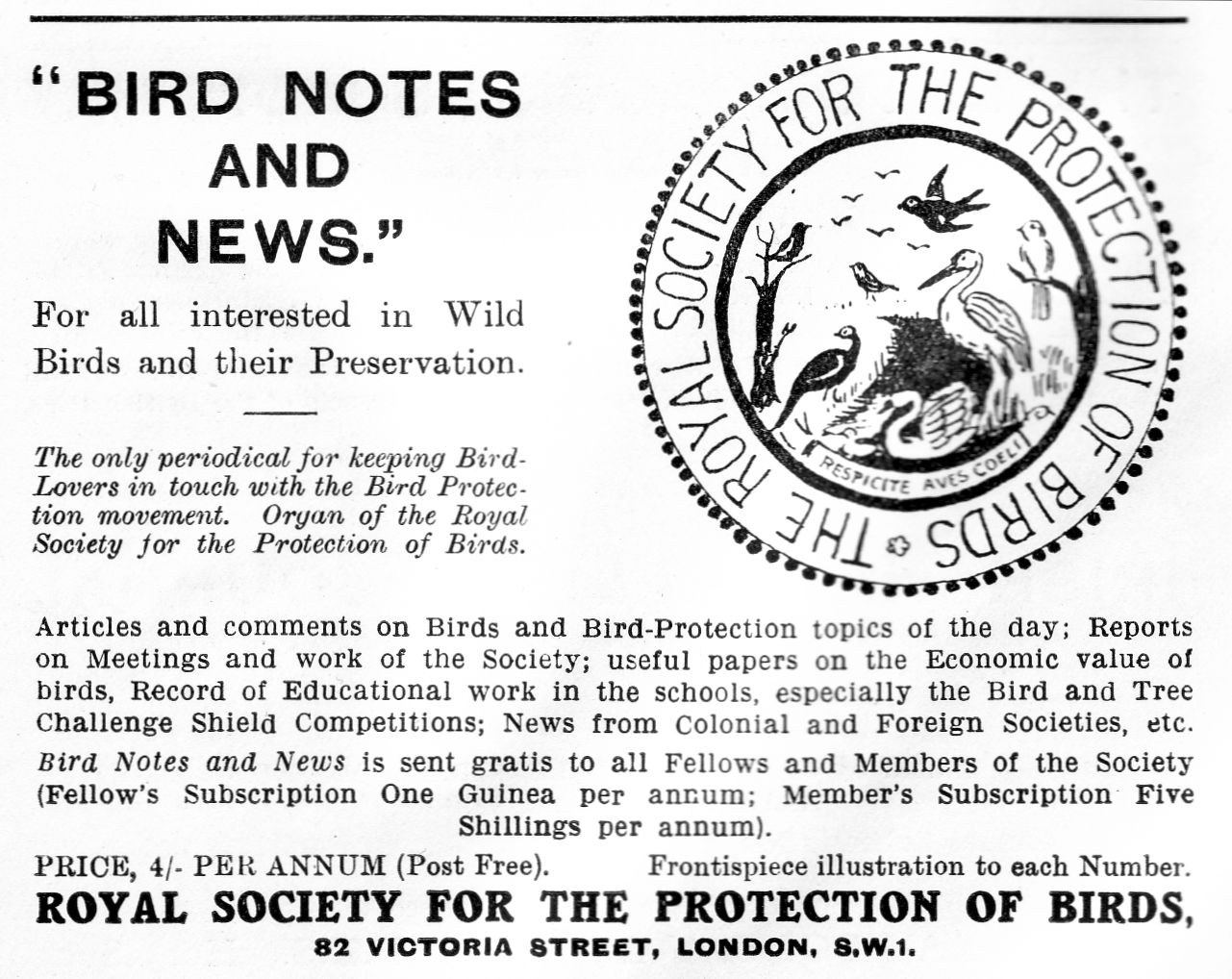
Advert for Bird Notes and News from the March 1934 edition of North Western Naturalist magazine. Note early logo.

Bird Notes and News (ISSN 0406-3392) was first published in April 1903.

The title changed to Bird Notes in 1947. In the 1950s, there were four copies per year (one for each season, published on the 1st of each third month, March, June, September and December). Each volume covered two years, spread over three calendar years. For example, volume XXV (25), number one was dated Winter 1951, and number eight in the same volume was dated Autumn 1953.

From the mid-1950s, many of the covers were by Charles Tunnicliffe. Two of the originals are on long-term loan to the Tunnicliffe gallery at Oriel Ynys Môn, but in 1995 the RSPB sold 114 at a Sotheby's auction, raising £210,000, the most expensive being a picture of a partridge which sold for £6,440.

From January 1964 (vol. 31, no. 1), publication increased to six per year, (issued in the odd-numbered months, January, March and so on, but dated "January–February", "March–April", etc.). Volumes again covered two years, so vol. 30, covering 1962–63, therefore included nine issues, ending with the "Winter 1963–64" edition instead of eight. The final edition, vol. 31 no. 12, was published in late 1965.

===== Editors =====
- Miss M. G. Davies, BA, MBOU (for many years, until vol. 30 no. 9)
- John Clegg (from vol. 31 No. 1 – vol. 31 no. 3)
- Jeremy Boswell (from vol. 31 no. 4 – vol. 31 no. 12)

==== Birds ====
Birds
- Discipline: Ornithology
- Language: English
- Edited by: Mark Ward

Publication details
- History: 1966–2013
- Publisher: RSPB (United Kingdom)
- Frequency: Quarterly

Standard abbreviations
- ISO 4: Birds

Indexing
- ISSN: 1367-983X

Links
- Journal homepage

Bird Notes' successor Birds (ISSN 1367-983X) replaced it immediately, with volume 1, number 1 being the January–February 1966 edition. Issues were published quarterly, numbered so that a new volume started every other year.

The Autumn 2013 edition, dated August–October 2013, being vol. 25 no. 7, was the last.

==== Nature's Home ====
Nature's Home
- Discipline: Ornithology
- Language: English
- Edited by: Mark Ward

Publication details
- History: 2013–present
- Publisher: RSPB (United Kingdom)
- Frequency: Quarterly

Standard abbreviations
- ISO 4: Nat.'s Home

Indexing
- ISSN: 2054-3433

Links
- Journal homepage

In Winter 2013 Birds was replaced by a new magazine, Nature's Home. The editor was Mark Ward. The magazine had an ABC-certified circulation of 600,885.

==== The RSPB Magazine ====
With the Summer/Autumn 2022 issue, the magazine has been re-titled. As of the Winter/Spring 2026 edition, its editor is Jamie Wyver.

=== Junior divisions ===
The RSPB has two separate groups for children and teenagers: Wildlife Explorers (founded in 1943 as the Junior Bird Recorders' Club; from 1965 to 2000 the Young Ornithologists' Club or YOC) and RSPB Phoenix. Wildlife Explorers is targeted at children aged between 8 and 12, although it also has some younger members, and has two different magazines: Wild Times for 0–7-year-olds, and Wild Explorer for 8–12-year-olds. RSPB Phoenix is aimed at teenagers, and produces Wingbeat magazine, which is primarily written by young people for young people. The RSPB is a member of The National Council for Voluntary Youth Services.

The RSPB Youth Council enables young people aged 16-24 to take an active part in running the society.

=== Big Garden Birdwatch ===
RSPB organises bird record data collection in annual collective birdwatching days in Britain. The RSPB describes this as the "world's biggest wildlife survey" and helps inform conservationists to gain a better knowledge on bird population trends in gardens in Britain. The Big Garden Birdwatch was launched as a children's activity in 1979, but from 2001 it has also encouraged adults to take part. In 2011, over 600,000 people took part, only 37% of whom were RSPB members. This event usually takes place in the last weekend of January. From the start of this annual survey records for house sparrows showed a decline of 60%, while starling populations declined by about 80% from 1979 to 2012.

In 2022, nearly 700,000 people took part in the Big Garden Birdwatch, counting more than 11 billion birds. In 2025, RSPB looked at how inclusive its participating communities were and started to promote more involvement of people living in urban areas, especially people living in flats without gardens, and more generally people aged over 35.

=== BirdTrack ===
BirdTrack is an online citizen science website, operated by the British Trust for Ornithology (BTO) on behalf of a partnership of the BTO, the RSPB, BirdWatch Ireland, the Scottish Ornithologists' Club and the Welsh Ornithological Society.

=== Birdcrime ===
Annual Birdcrime reports investigate and publish findings on crimes against birds of prey.

== Finances ==
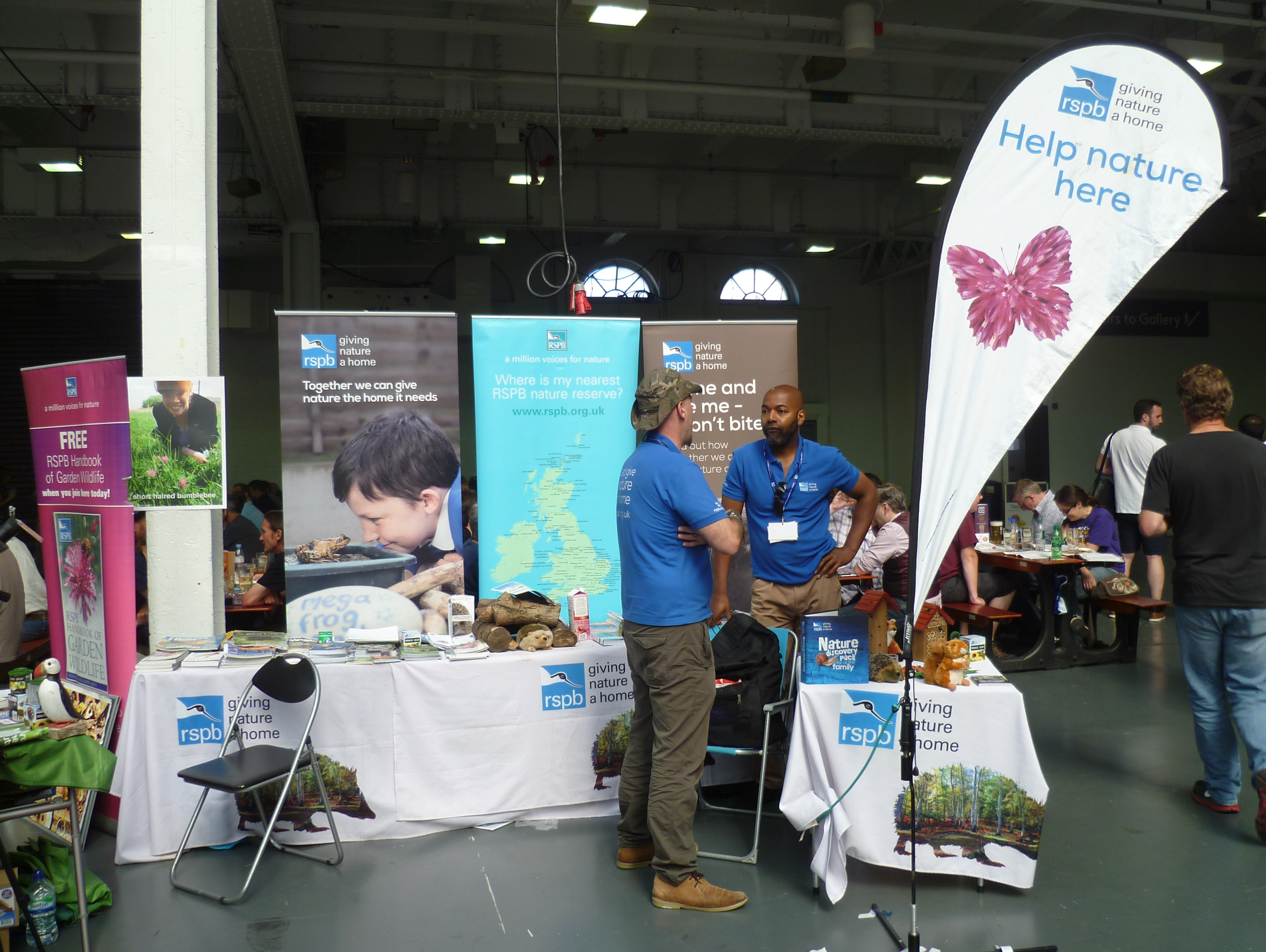
Fund-raising at the Great British Beer Festival 2016

The RSPB is funded primarily by its members; in 2006, over 50% of the society's £88 million income came from subscriptions, donations and legacies, worth a total of £53.669 million. As a registered charity, the organisation is entitled to gift aid worth an extra £0.25 on every £1.00 donated by income tax payers. The bulk of the income (£63.757 million in 2006) is spent on conservation projects, maintenance of the reserves and on education projects, with the rest going on fundraising efforts and reducing the pension deficit, worth £19.8 million in 2006. In 2024/25, total income was £152.9m, and expenditure was £134.1m. The organisation ended the financial year with £64.5 of financial reserves, of which £24.2m was earmarked for specific purposes.

== Advertising ==
It was reported in an article in The Daily Mail on 2 November 2014 that claims that the charity "was spending 90 per cent of its income on conservation" by the UK Advertising Standards Authority were incorrect. The article claimed that the true figure was closer to 26%. The Charity Commission investigated the claims, and contacted the RSPB to get it to clarify its web statement. The RSPB complied, with the clarification that 90% of its net income (after expenses, not gross income as received) was spent on conservation, and that conservation activities were diverse, not limited to spending on its own nature reserves. This was accepted by the Charity Commission.

== Patrons ==
- Queen Elizabeth II (until 2022)
- King Charles III (since 2024)

== Presidents ==
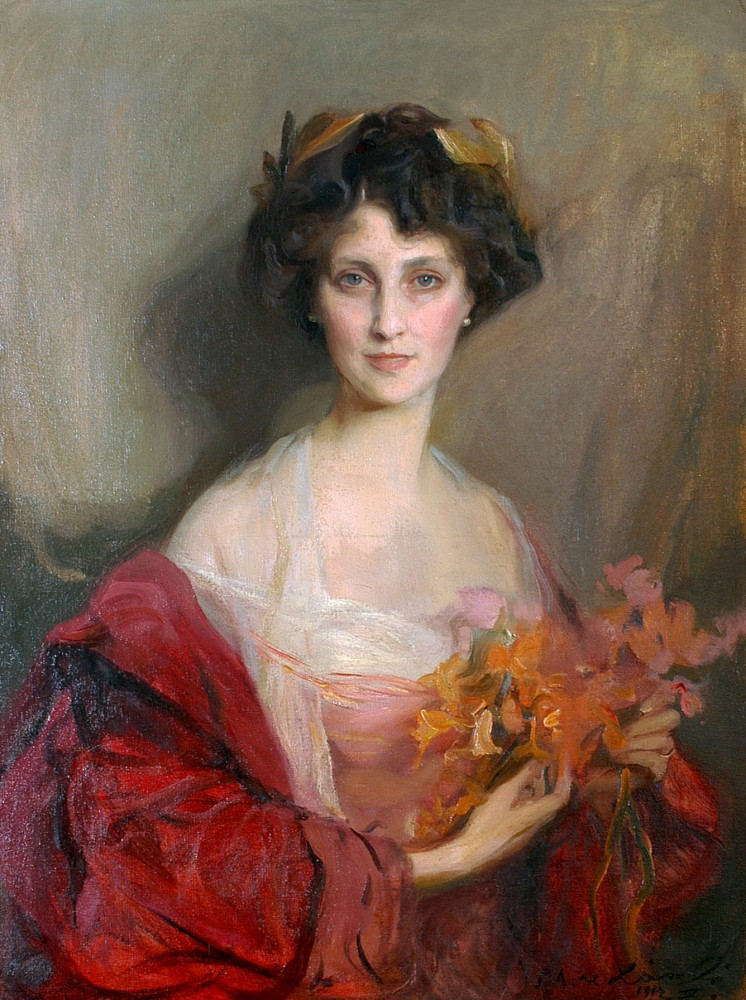
Winifred Cavendish-Bentinck, Duchess of Portland, painted by Philip Alexius de László in 1912

- Winifred Cavendish-Bentinck, Duchess of Portland 1891–1954
- Lord Forester to 1961
- Cyril Hurcomb 1961-
- Colonel Sir Tufton Beamish to 1970
- Robert Dougall 1970-1975
- Jack Donaldson 1975-1980
- Max Nicholson 1980–1985
- Magnus Magnusson 1985–1990
- Sir Derek Barber 1990–1991
- Ian Prestt 1991–1994
- Julian Pettifer 1994–?
- Jonathan Dimbleby 2001–?
- Julian Pettifer 2004–2009
- Kate Humble 2009–2013
- Miranda Krestovnikoff 2013–2022
- Dr Amir Khan 2022–(incumbent)

== Chief officers ==
Over time, the organisation's chief officers have been given different titles.

- William Henry Hudson – Chairman of Committee 1894
- Sir Montagu Sharpe, KBE DL – Chairman of Committee 1895–1942
- Phillip Brown
- Peter Conder OBE – Secretary 1963. Director 1964–1975
- Ian Prestt CBE – Director General 1975–1991
- Barbara Young – CEO 1991–1998
- Sir Graham Wynne – CEO 1998–2010
- Mike Clarke – Chief Executive 2010–2019
- Beccy Speight - Chief Executive 2019–

== Associate organisations ==
The RSPB is a member of Wildlife and Countryside Link. The RSPB is the UK Partner of BirdLife International and manages the South Atlantic Invasive Species Project on behalf of the partner governments.

== See also ==
- List of Birdlife International national partner organisations
- Royal Society for the Prevention of Cruelty to Animals
- National Trust for Places of Historic Interest or Natural Beauty
- Wildlife law in England and Wales
- Category:Royal Society for the Protection of Birds reserves

== Bibliography ==
- Adams, William Mark (2004). Against Extinction: The Story of Conservation. London Sterling, VA: Earthscan. ISBN 978-1-84407-055-8.
- Boardman, Robert (2006). The International Politics of Bird Conservation: Biodiversity, Regionalism And Global Governance. Cheltenham, UK Northampton, MA: Edward Elgar Publishing. ISBN 978-1-84542-403-9.
- Penna, Anthony N. (1999). Nature's Bounty: Historical and Modern Environmental Perspectives. Armonk, N.Y. U.S.A.: M. E. Sharpe. ISBN 978-0-7656-0187-2.
