= Control of Engagement Order 1947 =

- Statutory Rules and Orders
- Parliament of the United Kingdom
- Citation: SR&O 1947/2021

The Control of Engagement Order 1947 (SR&O 1947/2021) was an order issued by the Ministry of Labour which disallowed people to leave various industries (notably coal mining) and required all those seeking work to find employment through a labour exchange, and accept jobs as directed. Moreover, "employers shall not engage for employment men between the ages of 18 and 50, and women between the ages of 18 and 40, or seek to engage such persons, except through the Ministry of Labour exchanges."

== Calendar ==
The order was made under the Defence (General) Regulations 1939, as having effect by virtue of the Supplies and Services (Transitional Powers) Act 1945, as extended by the Supplies and Services (Extended Purposes) Act 1947. This was effectively an extension of wartime powers to peacetime.

== Authority ==
The order was made on 18 September, came into force on 6 October, a copy was laid before the house on 20 October 1947 and was supposed to expire on 1 January 1949. The period was extended to 1 January 1950 by the Control of Engagement (Amendment) Order 1948 (SI 1948/2608). It was actually withdrawn in March 1950.

== Background ==
After World War II Britain was in a difficult financial situation. A significant amount of national assets had been sold to finance the war, and production had been switched to essential supplies, including the military. In addition to a huge war debt, the country had a shortage of coal miners in the newly nationalised coal industry, as well as in textiles (formerly a key export) and agriculture.

Investment in most areas of commercial production had been cut back during the war, and so conditions in mills and mines were not good. In addition at the time of the order, there were still 700,000 more in the armed forces than at the beginning of the war and 670,000 in government administrative posts, leading to a further shortage of employable staff, apart from those dead or unable to work as a result of the war.

The National Government had taken powers during the war that allowed, as well as military conscription, "direction" of employment, certain reserved occupations, which were not eligible for conscription.

War regulations and bills to extend the emergency powers of the government enabled Attlee's Labour government to enact an order as extra-parliamentary legislation, which compelled certain groups of people to join or remain in particular industries.

== Opposition ==
Many occupations and professions were exempt, and this was characterised by Labour MP for Wroughton, Rhys Davies, in his parliamentary motion to annul the order, as controlling the employment of the working class. The infringement of liberties was taken up by others in the debate, from all political parties, including the minister himself, who characterises it as a necessary evil at a time of national emergency.

The order was the subject of a correspondence in the pages of the Dartford Chronicle between Margaret Thatcher (then Roberts) and Norman Dodds.
