= Military Training Act 1939 =

Act of the Parliament of the United Kingdom

Military Training Act 1939 (Note: Section 22.)
- Act of Parliament
- Parliament of the United Kingdom
- Long title: An Act to make temporary provision for rendering persons between the ages of twenty and twenty-one years liable to undergo training in the armed forces of the Crown; and for purposes connected with the matter aforesaid.
- Citation: 2 & 3 Geo. 6. c. 25
- Territorial extent: United Kingdom

Dates
- Royal assent: 26 May 1939
- Commencement: 26 May 1939 (Note: Section 21(1).)
- Expired: 26 May 1942
- Repealed: 23 May 1950
Other legislation
Repealed by	Statute Law Revision Act 1950
Relates to	National Service (Armed Forces) Act 1939

Status: Repealed

Text of statute as originally enacted

The Military Training Act 1939 (2 & 3 Geo. 6. c. 25) was an act of the Parliament of the United Kingdom on 26 May 1939, in a period of international tension that led to World War II. The act applied to males aged 20 and 21 years old who were to be called up for six months full-time military training, and then transferred to the Reserve. There was provision for conscientious objectors. It was the United Kingdom's first act of peacetime conscription and was intended to be temporary in nature, continuing for three years unless an Order in Council declared it was no longer necessary.

On 27 April 1939, Leslie Hore-Belisha, Secretary of State for War, persuaded the cabinet of Neville Chamberlain to introduce a limited form of conscription in Great Britain, but not in Northern Ireland, as a result of the deteriorating international situation and the rise of Nazi Germany. The vote was controversial with 87% of Labour MPs voting against the measure as a prelude to conscription, a result that left the Labour leader Clement Attlee "shaking with rage".

Men called up were to be known as 'militiamen' to distinguish them from the regular army. To emphasise this distinction, each man was issued with a suit in addition to a uniform. The intention was for the first intake to undergo six months of basic training before being discharged into an active reserve. They would then be recalled for short training periods and attend annual camps.

There was one registration under the act, of the first cohort of liable males, on Saturday 3 June 1939, and call-up for these men followed. However, the act was superseded on the outbreak of war in September 1939 by the National Service (Armed Forces) Act 1939 (2 & 3 Geo. 6. c. 81).

== Subsequent developments ==
The whole act was repealed by section 1(1) of, and the first schedule to, the Statute Law Revision Act 1950 (14 Geo. 6. c. 6), which came into force on 23 May 1950.
