= List of statutory rules and orders of the United Kingdom =

List of statutory rules and orders of the United Kingdom is an incomplete list of statutory rules and orders of the United Kingdom.

Statutory rules and orders were the predecessor of statutory instruments and they formed the secondary legislation of England, Scotland and Wales prior to 1948 and the coming into force of the Statutory Instruments Act 1946.

Quick links
Pre 1900	1900s	1910s	1920s	1930s	1940s
	1900	1910	1920	1930	1940
	1901	1911	1921	1931	1941
	1902	1912	1922	1932	1942
	1903	1913	1923	1933	1943
	1904	1914	1924	1934	1944
	1905	1915	1925	1935	1945
	1906	1916	1926	1936	1946
1897	1907	1917	1927	1937	1947
1898	1908	1918	1928	1938
1899	1909	1919	1929	1939

== 1897 ==
- County Court (Stannaries Fees) Order 1897 (SR&O 1897/306)
- Cork Electric Tramways Order 1897 (SR&O 1897/538)
- Zanzibar Order in Council 1897 (SR&O 1897/576)
- Foreign and Colonial Parcel Post Warrant 1897 (SR&O 1897/721)
- Belfast Street Tramways Order 1897 (SR&O 1897/768)
- Light Locomotives (Menai Bridge) Order 1897 (SR&O 1897/853)
- Dublin and Lucan Electric Railway Order 1897 (SR&O 1897/985)
- Dublin Southern District Tramways Order 1897 (SR&O 1897/986)

== 1898 ==
- Order of Secretary of State (No. 5), dated March 28, 1898, relating to Compressed Acetylene in Admixture with Oil-gas. (SR&O 1898/248)
- Southern Rhodesia Order in Council 1898 (SR&O 1898/1068)

== 1899 ==
- Local Government (Procedure of Councils) Order 1899 (SR&O 1899/43)
- Potteries Light Railways Order 1897 (SR&O 1899/76)
- Southern Rhodesia Order in Council 1899 (SR&O 1899/81)
- Merthyr Tydvil Light Railway Order 1899 (SR&O 1899/97)
- County Courts (Districts) Order in Council 1899 (SR&O 1899/178)
- Southern Rhodesia Naturalisation Order in Council 1899 (SR&O 1899/180)
- Urban District Councillors and Town Commissioners Ireland Election Order 1899 (SR&O 1899/210)
- Union Accounts Order 1899 (SR&O 1899/235)
- Kinver Light Railways Order 1898 (SR&O 1899/360)
- Dudley and District Light Railways Order 1898 (SR&O 1899/362)
- Bradford and Leeds Light Railway Order 1899 (SR&O 1899/577)
- West Hartlepool Light Railways Order 1897 (SR&O 1899/633)
- Isle of Thanet Light Railways Order 1898 (SR&O 1899/697)
- Southend-on-Sea and District Light Railway Order 1899 (SR&O 1899/793)
- North Shields Tynemouth and District Light Railways Order 1898 (SR&O 1899/830)
- Potteries Light Railways Order 1899 (SR&O 1899/983)
- Asylums Accounts Order 1899 (SR&O 1899/999)
- Local Government (Application of Enactments) Order 1898 (SR&O 1899/1120)

== 1900 ==
- North-Eastern Rhodesia Order in Council 1900 (SR&O 1900/89)
- Board of Education (Powers) Order in Council 1900 (SR&O 1900/600)
- Dublin and Lucan Electric Tramways Order 1900 (SR&O 1900/785)

== 1901 ==
- Rules of the Supreme Court, November 1900 (SR&O 1901/1)
- Penge (Supplemental) Drainage Scheme 1901 (SR&O 1901/210)
- London Government (Borough of Battersea) Order in Council 1901 (SR&O 1901/211)
- London Government (Borough of Bethnal Green) Order in Council 1901 (SR&O 1901/212)
- London Government (Borough of Camberwell) Order in Council 1901 (SR&O 1901/213)
- London Government (Borough of Deptford) Order in Council 1901 (SR&O 1901/214)
- London Government (Borough of Fulham) Order in Council 1901 (SR&O 1901/215)
- London Government (Borough of Hammersmith) Order in Council 1901 (SR&O 1901/216)
- London Government (Borough of Hampstead) Order in Council 1901 (SR&O 1901/217)
- London Government (Borough of Lewisham) Order in Council 1901 (SR&O 1901/218)
- London Government (Borough of Lambeth) Order in Council 1901 (SR&O 1901/219)
- London Government (Borough of Poplar) Order in Council 1901 (SR&O 1901/220)
- London Government (Borough of Shoreditch) Order in Council 1901 (SR&O 1901/221)
- London Government (Borough of Wandsworth) Order in Council 1901 (SR&O 1901/222)
- London Government (Borough of Woolwich) Order in Council 1901 (SR&O 1901/223)
- London County (Borough of Holborn) (Lincoln's Inn) Order 1901 (SR&O 1901/262)
- London Government (Borough of Bermondsey) Order in Council 1901 (SR&O 1901/264)
- London Government (Borough of Chelsea) Order in Council 1901 (SR&O 1901/265)
- London Government (Borough of Finsbury) Order in Council 1901 (SR&O 1901/266)
- London Government (Borough of Greenwich) Order in Council 1901 (SR&O 1901/267)
- London Government (Borough of Hackney) Order in Council 1901 (SR&O 1901/268)
- London Government (Borough of Holborn) Order in Council 1901 or Borough of Holborn (St. Andrew Holborn-above-Bars and St. George the Martyr) Scheme (No. 1) Order 1901 (SR&O 1901/269)
- London Government (Borough of Islington) Order in Council 1901 (SR&O 1901/270)
- London Government (Borough of Kensington) Order in Council 1901 (SR&O 1901/271)
- London Government (Borough of St. Marylebone) Order in Council 1901 (SR&O 1901/272)
- London Government (Borough of Paddington) Order in Council 1901 (SR&O 1901/273)
- London Government (Borough of St. Pancras) Order in Council 1901 (SR&O 1901/274)
- London Government (Borough of Southwark) Order in Council 1901 (SR&O 1901/275)
- London Government (Borough of Stepney) Order in Council 1901 (SR&O 1901/276)
- London Government (Borough of Stoke Newington) Order in Council 1901 (SR&O 1901/277)
- London Government (City of Westminster) Order in Council 1901 (SR&O 1901/278)
- London Registration Order in Council 1901 (SR&O 1901/279)
- City of Westminster (Close of the Collegiate Church of St. Peter) Scheme) 1901 (SR&O 1901/537)
- Borough of St. Pancras (Supplemental) Scheme 1901 (SR&O 1901/538)
- Borough of Holborn (Gray's Inn) Scheme 1901 (SR&O 1901/539)
- Borough of Stepney (Tower of London) Scheme 1901 (SR&O 1901/540)
- Barotziland—North-Western Rhodesia Order in Council 1899 (SR&O 1901/567)
- Board of Education (Powers) Order in Council 1901 (SR&O 1901/587)
- Order in Council applying the provisions of the Patents, Designs and Trade Marks Act 1883, as amended, to the Republic of Honduras (SR&O 1901/799)
- East Africa (Lands) Order in Council 1901 (SR&O 1901/661)
- Home Work Order of 11th December 1901 (SR&O 1901/983)
- Court of Burgesses Scheme 1901 (SR&O 1901/811)
- Railway Regulation (Traffic) Order 1901 (SR&O 1901/1041)

== 1902 ==
- Prevention of Accidents Rules 1902 (SR&O 1902/616)
- Board of Education (Powers) Order in Council 1902 (SR&O 1902/647)
- East Africa Order in Council 1902 (SR&O 1902/661)
- Order prescribing Forms under the Licensing Act 1902 (SR&O 1902/831)

== 1903 ==
- Order in Council confirming the Metropolitan Water Stock Regulations 1903 (SR&O 1903/673)

== 1904 ==
- Order in Council as to the discharge of the duties of the office of Registrar of His Majesty in ecclesiastical and maritime causes. (SR&O 1904/1257)
- Heavy Motor-car Order 1904 (SR&O 1904/1809)

== 1905 ==
- Order in Council founding the bishopric of Birmingham (SR&O 1905/7)
- Order of Secretary of State (No. 5A) relating to Compressed Acetylene in Admixture with Oil-Gas. (SR&O 1905/1128)
- Order in Council appointing Knaresborough the See of a suffragan bishop. (SR&O 1905/1215)
- Wool, Goat-Hair and Camel-Hair Regulations 1905 (SR&O 1905/1293)

== 1906 ==
- Flax and Tow Spinning and Weaving Regulations 1906 (SR&O 1906/177)
- Order of the Board of Trade, Dated July 30, 1906 Substituting a new Table A for that contained in the First Schedule to the Companies Act 1862 (SR&O 1906/596)
- Locomotives and Waggons (Used on Lines and Sidings) Regulations 1906 (SR&O 1906/679)
- County Court Districts (Postponement) (No. 17) Order 1906 (SR&O 1906/839)

== 1907 ==
- Hemp Spinning and Weaving Regulations 1907 (SR&O 1907/660)
- Public Trustee Rules 1907 (SR&O 1907/938)
- Horsehair Regulations 1907 (SR&O 1907/984)

== 1908 ==
- East India Wool Regulations 1908 (SR&O 1908/1287)
- Electricity Regulations 1908 (SR&O 1908/1312)
- Foreign and Colonial Post (Insured Boxes) Warrant 1908 (SR&O 1908/1313)
- Order in Council as to Naval Marriages (SR&O 1908/1316)

== 1909 ==
- Order in Council regulating appeals from the Supreme Court of Appeal for Hong Kong to His Majesty in Council. (SR&O 1909/810)
- Regulations dated October 15, 1909, for the Grinding of Metals and Racing of Grindstones. (SR&O 1909/1155)
- Order in Council making continuing Order directing that all appeals to His Majesty in Council shall be referred to the Judicial Committee. (SR&O 1909/1228)

== 1910 ==
- Order in Council regulating appeals to His Majesty in Council from the Court of Appeal and from the Supreme Court of New Zealand. (SR&O 1910/70)
- Order in Council regulating appeals by special leave from the High Court of the Commonwealth of Australia to His Majesty in Council. (SR&O 1910/1128)
- Dublin and Lucan Electric Railway Order 1910 (SR&O 1910/1315)
- Lucan and Leixlip Electric Railway Order 1910 (SR&O 1910/1316)

== 1911 ==
- Northern Rhodesia Order in Council 1911 (SR&O 1911/438)
- Order in Council confirming a Merchant Shipping Act of New Zealand. (SR&O 1911/442)

== 1912 ==
- Public Trustee Rules 1912 (SR&O 1912/348)

== 1913 ==
- Seal Fisheries (Crown Colonies and Protectorates) Order in Council 1913 (SR&O 1913/488)

== 1914 ==
- Order in Council applying the Colonial Probates Act 1892 to the Union of South Africa (SR&O 1914/144)
- Defence of the Realm (Consolidation) Regulations 1914 (SR&O 1914/1234)

== 1915 ==
- Official Secrets (Commonwealth of Australia) Order in Council 1915 (SR&O 1915/1199)
- Indictment Rules 1915 (SR&O 1915/1235)

== 1916 ==
- Aliens Restriction Order 1916 (SR&O 1916/122)
- Public Trustee Rules 1916 (SR&O 1916/489)
- Order applying s. 1 of the Marriage of British Subjects (Facilities) Act 1915 to Dominica, Gambia, Gold Coast, Hong Kong, Leeward Islands, Mauritius, St. Vincent, Straits Settlements and Trinidad and Tobago. (SR&O 1916/555)
- Order applying s. 1 of the Marriage of British Subjects (Facilities) Act 1915 to East Africa (now Kenya), Gambia and Uganda Protectorates. (SR&O 1916/556)
- Order applying s. 1 of the Marriage of British Subjects (Facilities) Act 1915 to Newfoundland and the State of Victoria. (SR&O 1916/632)
- Order applying s. 1 of the Marriage of British Subjects (Facilities) Act 1915 to Sierra Leone Protectorate. (SR&O 1916/822)
- Order applying s. 1 of the Marriage of British Subjects (Facilities) Act 1915 to the Island of St Lucia and the Colonies of Seychelles and Sierra Leone. (SR&O 1916/862)

== 1917 ==
- Order applying s. 1 of the Marriage of British Subjects (Facilities) Act 1915 to the Bermudas and British Honduras. (SR&O 1917/210)
- Order in Council dated 6 February 1917 approving regulations as to the manner of distribution of shares of prize, etc. (SR&O 1917/212)
- Order applying s. 1 of the Marriage of British Subjects (Facilities) Act 1915 to Jamaica and the Gilbert and Ellice Islands. (SR&O 1917/747)
- Order applying s. 1 of the Marriage of British Subjects (Facilities) Act 1915 to Nayasaland and Zanzibar. (SR&O 1917/748)
- Order applying s. 1 of the Marriage of British Subjects (Facilities) Act 1915 to the Pacific Protectorate. (SR&O 1917/749)
- Tin or Terne Plates Manufacture Welfare Order 1917 (SR&O 1917/1035)
- Order applying s. 1 of the Marriage of British Subjects (Facilities) Act 1915 to the Bahamas, Barbados, Basutoland, Gibraltar and Grenada. (SR&O 1917/1242)
- Order applying s. 1 of the Marriage of British Subjects (Facilities) Act 1915 to Bechuanaland and Swaziland. (SR&O 1917/1243)

== 1918 ==
- Tanning (Two-Bath Process) Welfare Order 1918 (SR&O 1918/368)
- Dyeing (Use of Bichromate of Potassium or Sodium) Welfare Order 1918 (SR&O 1918/369)
- Air Force (Application of Enactments) (No. 1) Order 1918 (SR&O 1918/538)
- Air Force (Application of Enactments) (No. 2) Order 1918 (SR&O 1918/548)
- Glass Bottle, etc. Manufacture Welfare Order 1918 (SR&O 1918/558)
- Air Force Reserve Application of Enactments) (No. 1) Order 1918 (SR&O 1918/1064)
- Order applying s. 1 of the Marriage of British Subjects (Facilities) Act 1915 to Southern Rhodesia. (SR&O 1918/1066)
- Order applying s. 1 of the Marriage of British Subjects (Facilities) Act 1915 to Fiji. (SR&O 1918/1285)

== 1919 ==
- Order applying s. 1 of the Marriage of British Subjects (Facilities) Act 1915 to Northern Rhodesia. (SR&O 1919/473)
- Order in Council approving Draft Charter under section 13(2) of the Welsh Church Act, 1914 (4 & 5 Geo. 5. c. 91) incorporating the Representative Body of the Church in Wales. (SR&O 1919/564)
- Order of Secretary of State (No. 9), dated June 23, 1919, relating to Compressed Acetylene contained in a Porous Substance. (SR&O 1919/809)
- Aliens Order 1919 (SR&O 1919/1077)
- Fruit Preserving Welfare Order 1919 (SR&O 1919/1136)
- Ministry of Transport (Board of Trade Exception of Powers) Order 1919 (SR&O 1919/1440)
- Ministry of Transport (Ministry of Health Exception of Powers) Order 1919 (SR&O 1919/1441)
- Ministry of Transport (Road Board Transfer of Powers) Order 1919 (SR&O 1919/1442)
- Ministry of Transport (Commissioners for the Conservancy of the River Mersey Transfer of Powers) Order 1919 (SR&O 1919/1938)

== 1920 ==
- North Pembrokeshire Water (Temporary Increase of Charges) Order 1920 (SR&O 1920/62)
- Uppingham Waterworks (Temporary Increase of Charges) Order 1920 (SR&O 1920/65)
- Order in Council as to Registration of Ships of the Ministry of Agriculture. (SR&O 1920/260)
- Bolsover and District Water (Temporary Increase of Charges) Order 1920 (SR&O 1920/269)
- Felixstowe and Walton Waterworks Temporary Increase of Charges) Order 1920 (SR&O 1920/327)
- Aliens Order 1920 (SR&O 1920/448)
- Woodbridge District Water (Temporary Increase of Charges) Order 1920 (SR&O 1920/460)
- Laundries Welfare Order 1920 (SR&O 1920/654)
- Higham and Hundred of Hoo Water (Temporary Increase of Charges) Order 1920 (SR&O 1920/777)
- Great Berkhampstead Water (Temporary Increase of Charges) Order 1920 (SR&O 1920/782)
- Woodhall Spa Water (Temporary Increase of Charges) Order 1920 (SR&O 1920/783)
- Order applying s. 1 of the Marriage of British Subjects (Facilities) Act 1915 to Nigeria. (SR&O 1920/826)
- Ministry of Transport (Holyhead Harbour Transfer of Property) Order 1920 (SR&O 1920/829)
- Ministry of Transport (Ramsgate Harbour Transfer of Property) Order 1920 (SR&O 1920/830)
- Henley-on-Thames Water (Temporary Increase of Charges) Order 1920 (SR&O 1920/835)
- Uganda Order 1920 (SR&O 1920/884)
- Wey Valley Water (Temporary Increase of Charges) Order 1920 (SR&O 1920/964)
- Flint Water (Temporary Increase of Charges) Order 1920 (SR&O 1920/968)
- Chelsham and Woldingham Water (Temporary Increase of Charges) Order 1920 (SR&O 1920/981)
- Hungerford Water (Temporary Increase of Charges) Order 1920 (SR&O 1920/982)
- Sheringham Water (Temporary Increase of Charges) Order 1920 (SR&O 1920/983)
- Alresford Water (Temporary Increase of Charges) Order 1920 (SR&O 1920/1016)
- Royston Water (Temporary Increase of Charges) Order 1920 (SR&O 1920/1030)
- Colne Valley Water (Temporary Increase of Charges) Order 1920 (SR&O 1920/1246)
- Order as to Fees for Execution of Writs of Fieri Facias. (SR&O 1920/1250)
- East Worcestershire Waterworks (Temporary Increase of Charges) Order 1920 (SR&O 1920/1253)
- Chiddingfold and District Water (Temporary Increase of Charges) Order 1920 (SR&O 1920/1256)
- South Staffordshire Water (Temporary Increase of Charges) Order 1920 (SR&O 1920/1274)
- Croft (Leicestershire) Water (Temporary Increase of Charges) Order 1920 (SR&O 1920/1297)
- Uckfield Water (Temporary Increase of Charges) Order 1920 (SR&O 1920/1330)
- Elham Valley Water (Temporary Increase of Charges) Order 1920 (SR&O 1920/1386)
- Limpsfield and Oxted Water (Temporary Increase of Charges) Order 1920 (SR&O 1920/1426)
- Gut Scraping, Tripe Dressing, etc. Welfare Order 1920 (SR&O 1920/1437)
- Cranbrook District Water (Temporary Increase of Charges) Order 1920 (SR&O 1920/1625)
- Herring Curing (Norfolk and Suffolk) Welfare Order 1920 (SR&O 1920/1662)
- West Surrey Water (Temporary Increase of Charges) Order 1920 (SR&O 1920/1674)
- Rickmansworth and Uxbridge Valley Water (Temporary Increase of Charges) Order 1920 (SR&O 1920/1707)
- Sevenoaks Water (Temporary Increase of Charges) Order 1920 (SR&O 1920/1841)
- Oakham Water (Temporary Increase of Charges) Order 1920 (SR&O 1920/1860)
- Lewes Water (Temporary Increase of Charges) Order 1920 (SR&O 1920/1868)
- Newquay and District Water (Temporary Increase of Charges) Order 1920 (SR&O 1920/1889)
- Banbury Water (Temporary Increase of Charges) Order 1920 (SR&O 1920/1906)
- Eastbourne Water (Temporary Increase of Charges) Order 1920 (SR&O 1920/1907)
- Rainham Water (Temporary Increase of Charges) Order 1920 (SR&O 1920/1908)
- Folkestone Water (Temporary Increase of Charges) Order 1920 (SR&O 1920/1924)
- Southwold Water (Temporary Increase of Charges) Order 1920 (SR&O 1920/2035)
- South West Suburban Water (Temporary Increase of Charges) Order 1920 (SR&O 1920/2038)
- Great Yarmouth Water (Temporary Increase of Charges) Order 1920 (SR&O 1920/2043)
- Order applying s. 1 of the Marriage of British Subjects (Facilities) Act 1915 to New Zealand. (SR&O 1920/2081)
- Swaffham Water (Temporary Increase of Charges) Order 1920 (SR&O 1920/2185)
- Ministry of Transport (Athy-Wolfhill and Castlecomer Colliery Railways Transfer of Property) Order 1920 (SR&O 1920/2296)
- Kenya (Annexation) Order in Council 1920 (SR&O 1920/2342)
- Kenya Protectorate Order in Council 1920 (SR&O 1920/2343)
- Portmadoc Water (Temporary Increase of Charges) Order 1920 (SR&O 1920/2375)
- Ministry of Transport (Menai Bridge Transfer of Powers and Property) Order 1920 (SR&O 1920/2379)
- Newhaven and Seaford Water (Temporary Increase of Charges) Order 1920 (SR&O 1920/2407)
- Crawley and District Water (Temporary Increase of Charges) Order 1920 (SR&O 1920/2428)
- Kenilworth Water (Temporary Increase of Charges) Order 1920 (SR&O 1920/2429)
- Hailsham Water (Temporary Increase of Charges) Order 1920 (SR&O 1920/2460)

== 1921 ==
- Lee-on-the-Solent Light Railway Order 1921 (SR&O 1922/216)
- Glass Bevelling Welfare Order 1921 (SR&O 1921/288)
- Totton, Hythe and Fawley Light Railway Order 1921 (SR&O 1922/335)
- Order in Council fixing "Appointed Days" for certain purposes under the Government of Ireland Act. (SR&O 1921/533)
- Order as to Fees for Execution of Process in certain Proceedings. (SR&O 1921/827)
- Southend-on-Sea Corporation Light Railways (Temporary Increase of Charges) Interim Order 1921 (SR&O 1921/829)
- Ministry of Transport (Lancashire and Yorkshire Railway) Order 1921 (SR&O 1921/994)
- Ministry of Transport (Metropolitan District Railway) Order 1921 (SR&O 1921/995)
- Kenya Colony Order in Council 1921 (SR&O 1921/1135)
- Order in Council as to Registration of Ships of the Board of Trade. (SR&O 1921/1211)
- Ministry of Transport (Great Western Railway) Order 1921 (SR&O 1921/1306)
- Ministry of Transport (South Eastern Railway) Order 1921 (SR&O 1921/1307)
- North Middlesex Gas Order 1921 (SR&O 1921/1357)
- Spenborough Urban District Council Gas Order 1921 (SR&O 1921/1373)
- Order in Council under the Government of Ireland Act, 1920 fixing Appointed Day for certain provisions relating to the Supreme and Appeal Courts, Judges and Offices. (SR&O 1921/1527)
- Regulations under the Riot (Damages) Act 1886, as to claims for compensation. (SR&O 1921/1536)
- Walthamstow Urban District Council Light Railways (Temporary Increase of Charges) Interim Order 1921 (SR&O 1921/1683)
- Port of London Stock Regulations 1921 (SR&O 1921/1700)
- Supreme Court of Judicature (Northern Ireland) Order 1921 (SR&O 1921/1802)
- General Adaptation of Enactments (Northern Ireland) Order 1921 (SR&O 1921/1804)
- Celluloid (Manufacture etc.) Regulations 1921 (SR&O 1921/1825)
- Aerated Waters Regulations 1921 (SR&O 1921/1932)
- Hollow-ware and Galvanising Welfare Order 1921 (SR&O 1921/2032)
- Hides and Skins Regulations 1921 (SR&O 1921/2076)

== 1922 ==
- Government of Ireland (Adaptation of Enactments) (No. 1) Order 1922 (SR&O 1922/77)
- Government of Ireland (Adaptation of Enactments) (No. 2) Order 1922 (SR&O 1922/78)
- Government of Ireland (Supreme Court Matters, &c.) Order 1922 (SR&O 1922/79)
- Government of Ireland (Adaptation of the Taxing Acts) Order 1922 (SR&O 1922/80)
- Government of Ireland (Adaptation of Enactments) (No. 3) Order 1922 (SR&O 1922/183)
- Government of Ireland (Adaptation of Unemployment Insurance Acts) Order 1922 (SR&O 1922/185)
- Importation of Plumage (No. 1) Order 1922 (SR&O 1922/275)
- Indiarubber Regulations 1922 (SR&O 1922/329)
- Ministry of Transport (Board of Trade Exception of Powers) (Amendment) Order 1922 (SR&O 1922/356)
- Welsh Highland Railway (Light Railway) Order 1922 (SR&O 1922/432)
- Doncaster Corporation Light Railways (Extension) Order 1922 (SR&O 1922/449)
- Government of Ireland (Modification of Old Age Pensions Acts) Order 1922 (SR&O 1922/467)
- Importation of Plumage (No. 2) Order 1922 (SR&O 1922/613)
- Chemical Works Regulations 1922 (SR&O 1922/731)
- Newcastle-upon-Tyne Corporation Light Railway Order 1922 (SR&O 1922/1167)
- Woodworking Machinery Regulations 1922 (SR&O 1922/1196)
- Palestine Order in Council 1922 (SR&O 1922/1282)
- Government of Ireland (Election Laws Adaptation) (Northern Ireland) Order 1922 (SR&O 1922/1352)
- Maintenance Orders (Facilities for Enforcement) Rules 1922 (SR&O 1922/1355)

== 1923 ==
- Welsh Highland Railway (Light Railway) Order 1923 (SR&O 1923/275)
- Aliens Order 1923 (SR&O 1923/326)
- Ryde Gas Order 1923 (SR&O 1923/350)
- Irish Free State (Consequential Adaptation of Enactments) Order 1923 (SR&O 1923/405)
- Irish Free State (Consequential Adaptation of Taxing Acts) Order 1923 (SR&O 1923/453)
- Palestine (Amendment) Order in Council 1923 (SR&O 1923/619)
- Newcastle-upon-Tyne Corporation Light Railway (Extension) Order 1923 (SR&O 1923/704)
- Importation of Plumage (No. 1) Order 1923 (SR&O 1923/746)
- Rotherham Gas (Charges) Order 1923 (SR&O 1923/749)
- Chelsham and Woldingham Waterworks (Modification of Charges Order) 1923 (SR&O 1923/863)
- Flamborough North Sea Landing Harbour Order 1923 (SR&O 1923/1385)
- Importation of Plumage (No. 2) Order 1923 (SR&O 1923/1496)

== 1924 ==
- Northern Rhodesia Order in Council 1924 (SR&O 1924/324)
- Copyright Act 1911 (Extension to Palestine) Order 1924 (SR&O 1924/385)
- Forestry (Transfer of Woods) Order 1924 (S&RO 1924/386)
- Irish Free State (Unemployment Insurance Arrangement) Order 1924 (SR&O 1924/387)
- National Library of Wales (Delivery of Books) Regulations 1924 (SR&O 1924/400)
- Longridge and Hellifield Light Railway Order 1924 (SR&O 1924/582)
- Callington Light Railway (Abandonment) Order 1924 (SR&O 1924/597)
- Election Laws (Northern Ireland) Order 1924 (SR&O 1924/927)
- Merchant Shipping (Fees) Order 1924 (SR&O 1924/1056)
- Order of Secretary of State (No. 1), dated September 20, 1924, making Byelaws as to the Conveyance of Explosives on Roads, and in certain special cases. (SR&O 1924/1129)
- County Court Districts (Chorley and Cockermouth) Order 1924 (SR&O 1924/1182)
- Auxiliary Air Force Order 1924 (SR&O 1924/1212)
- Air Force Reserve Order 1924 (SR&O 1924/1213)
- Palestine (Appeal to Privy Council) Order in Council 1924 (SR&O 1924/1243)
- Longridge and Hellifield Light Railway (Amendment) Order 1924 (SR&O 1924/1324)
- Forestry (Title of Commissioners of Woods) Order 1924 (SR&O 1924/1370)
- Order in Council as to registration of ships of the Government of Australia. (SR&O 1924/1391)
- Gosport and District Gas Order 1924 (SR&O 1924/1442)
- Newcastle-upon-Tyne and Gateshead Gas Order 1924 (SR&O 1924/1455)

== 1925 ==
- Docks Regulations 1925 (SR&O 1925/231)
- Special Restriction (Coloured Alien Seamen) Order 1925 (SR&O 1925/290)
- Biggleswade and District Gas Order 1925 (SR&O 1925/297)
- Oystermouth Railway or Tramroad and Mumbles Railway (Electrical Power) Order 1925 (SR&O 1925/550)
- Hope Harbour Order 1925 (SR&O 1925/576)
- County Court Districts (Hull and Patrington) Order 1925 (SR&O 1925/599)
- Aliens Order 1925 (SR&O 1925/760)
- Palestinian Citizenship Order 1925 (SR&O 1925/777)
- Brentwood Gas Order 1925 (SR&O 1925/790)
- Grinding of Metals (Miscellaneous Industries) Regulations 1925 (SR&O 1925/904)
- Order in Council applying s. 1 of the Marriage of British Subjects (Facilities) Act 1915 to the Isle of Man. (SR&O 1925/1032)
- Grinding of Cutlery and Edge Tools Regulations 1925 (SR&O 1925/1089)
- Land Registration Rules 1925 (SR&O 1925/1093)
- Foot-and-Mouth Disease (Packing Materials) Order of 1925 (SR&O 1925/1178)
- Importation of Plumage (No. 1) Order 1925 (SR&O 1925/1238)
- County Court Districts (Pontypool, Tredegar and Newport) Order 1925 (SR&O 1925/1248)
- Order in Council applying s. 1 of the Marriage of British Subjects (Facilities) Act 1915 to Cyprus. (SR&O 1925/1324)

== 1926 ==
- Benefices Rules 1926 (SR&O 1926/357)
- Supreme Court Documents (Production) Rules 1926 (SR&O 1926/461)
- Herring Curing (Scotland) Welfare Order 1926 (SR&O 1926/535) (S24)
- Romney, Hythe and Dymchurch Light Railway Order 1926 (SR&O 1926/741)
- Order in Council (No. 26) Relating to Picric Acid, Picrates and Mixtures of Picric Acid with other substances (SR&O 1926/823)
- Liverpool Gas Order 1926 (SR&O 1926/853)
- Croydon Gas Order 1926 (SR&O 1926/999)
- Order in Council as to registration of ships of the Government of the Straits Settlements. (SR&O 1926/1036)
- Order in Council dated 5 November 1926, approving regulations as to Prize Money Accounts. (SR&O 1926/1421)
- County Court Districts (Harwich) Order 1926 (SR&O 1926/1503)
- Mansfield and District Light Railways (Extensions &c.) Order 1926 (SR&O 1926/1665)

== 1927 ==
- County Court Districts (Mold and Flint) Order 1927 (SR&O 1927/16)
- Overseers Order 1927 (SR&O 1927/55)
- Isles of Scilly Order 1927 (SR&O 1927/59)
- Rating and Valuation Act (Transfer of Officers) Order 1927 (SR&O 1927/80)
- Rating and Valuation Act (Repeals, etc.) Order 1927 (SR&O 1927/90)
- Palestine Currency Order 1927 (SR&O 1927/91)
- London Midland and Scottish Railway (Burton and Ashby Light Railway Abandonment) Order 1927 (SR&O 1927/94)
- Bakehouses Welfare Order 1927 (SR&O 1927/191)
- Air Navigation (Amendment) Order 1927 (SR&O 1927/263)
- Transit of Animals Order 1927 (SR&O 1927/289)
- Animals (Miscellaneous Provisions) Order 1927 (SR&O 1927/290)
- Assessment Committees (Financial Statement and Audit of Accounts Order 1927 (SR&O 1927/308)
- Earby and Thornton Gas Order 1927 (SR&O 1927/311)
- Norwich Gas Order 1927 (SR&O 1927/312)
- Uxbridge, Maidenhead, Wycombe and District Gas Order 1927 (SR&O 1927/313)
- Assessment Committees (Form of Annual Report) Rules 1927 (SR&O 1927/326)
- Supreme Court of Judicature (Northern Ireland) Order 1927 (SR&O 1927/342)
- Coroners (Orders as to Districts) Rules 1927 (SR&O 1927/343)
- Heywood and Middleton Light Railway Order 1927 (SR&O 1927/363)
- London Midland and Scottish and Great Western Companies (Avonmouth Light Railway Transfer and Amendment) Order 1927 (SR&O 1927/388)
- Milford and St Bride's Bay Light Railway (Extension of Time, etc.) Order 1927 (SR&O 1927/629)
- Ministry of Labour (Transfer of Powers) Order 1927 (SR&O 1927/677)
- Herring Curing Welfare Order 1927 (SR&O 1927/813)
- Hooton Light Railway (Winding Up) Order 1927 (SR&O 1927/846)
- Sacks (Cleaning and Repairing) Welfare Order 1927 (SR&O 1927/860)
- Biscuit Factories Welfare Order 1927 (SR&O 1927/872)
- Pontypridd Light Railway Order 1927 (SR&O 1927/885)
- Diseases of Animals Order 1927 (SR&O 1927/1070)
- Auxiliary Air Force Order 1927 (SR&O 1927/1081)
- Order in Council applying s. 1 of the Marriage of British Subjects (Facilities) Act 1915 to Guernsey. (SR&O 1927/1084)
- Royal Botanic Gardens, Kew, Regulations 1927 (SR&O 1927/1178)
- Government of Ireland (Intestates Estates) Order 1927 (SR&O 1927/1204)
- Air Navigation (Mandated Territories) Order in Council 1927 (SR&O 1927/1244)
- Air Navigation (Colonies, Protectorates and Mandated Territories) Order 1927 (SR&O 1927/1245)
- London and North Eastern Railway Order 1927 (SR&O 1927/1329)
- Tower Gardens Regulations 1927 (SR&O 1927/1348)

== 1928 ==
- Manufacture of Cinematograph Film Regulations 1928 (SR&O 1928/82)
- Pleuro-Pneumonia Order 1928 (SR&O 1928/205)
- Cattle Plague Order 1928 (SR&O 1928/206)
- Southend-on-Sea and District Gas Order 1928 (SR&O 1928/210)
- Southern Heights Light Railway Order 1928 (SR&O 1928/265)
- Summary Jurisdiction Process (Isle of Man) Order 1928 (SR&O 1928/377)
- Horizontal Milling Machines Regulations 1928 (SR&O 1928/548)
- France (Extradition) Order in Council 1928 (SR&O 1928/575)
- Romney, Hythe and Dymchurch Light Railway (Extension) Order 1928 (SR&O 1928/613)
- County Court Districts (Towcester) Order 1928 (SR&O 1928/873)
- Order in Council under section 13 (2) of the Currency and Bank Notes Act, 1928 (18 & 19 Geo. 5. c. 13) as to the commencement of the Act (SR&O 1928/897)
- East Surrey Gas Order 1928 (SR&O 1928/1019)
- Housing Acts (Revision of Contributions) Order 1928 (SR&O 1928/1039)

== 1929 ==
- National Health Insurance (Extension of Enactments to Northern Ireland) Order 1929 (SR&O 1929/10)
- Cotton Cloth Factories Regulations (SR&O 1929/300)
- Tunbridge Wells Gas Order 1929 (SR&O 1929/346)
- Oil Cake Welfare Order 1929 (SR&O 1929/534)
- County Court Districts (Miscellaneous No. 2) Order 1929 (SR&O 1929/590)
- Petroleum-spirit (Motor Vehicles, &c.) Regulations 1929 (SR&O 1929/952)
- Wombwell Gas (Charges) Order 1929 (SR&O 1929/961)
- Petroleum (Carbide of Calcium) Order 1929 (SR&O 1929/992)
- Petroleum (Mixtures) Order 1929 (SR&O 1929/993)
- Air Navigation (Amendment) Guernsey Order 1929 (SR&O 1929/1019)
- Ipswich Gas Order 1929 (SR&O 1929/1097)
- Prescot Gas Order 1929 (SR&O 1929/1099)

== 1930 ==
- Petroleum (Compressed Gases) Order 1930 (SR&O 1930/34)
- Post Office Register (Trustee Savings Banks) Regulations 1930 (SR&O 1930/40)
- Cement Works Welfare Order 1930 (SR&O 1930/94)
- Rawmarsh Gas Order 1930 (SR&O 1930/115)
- Rawmarsh Gas (Charges) Order 1930 (SR&O 1930/170)
- Isles of Scilly Order 1930 (SR&O 1930/216)
- Order in Council applying s. 1 of the Marriage of British Subjects (Facilities) Act 1915 to Jersey. (SR&O 1930/229)
- Parrots (Prohibition of Import) Regulations 1930 (SR&O 1930/299)
- Tanning Welfare Order 1930 (SR&O 1930/312)
- Order in Council as to registration of ships of the Northern Ireland Government. (SR&O 1930/336)
- Wandsworth, Wimbledon and Epsom District Gas Order 1930 (SR&O 1930/544)
- County Court Districts (Willesden) Order 1930 (SR&O 1930/1012)

== 1931 ==
- Shipbuilding Regulations 1931 (SR&O 1931/133)
- Herefordshire (Ross Urban, Ross Rural and Whitchurch Rural) Order 1931 (SR&O 1931/269)
- Refractory Materials Regulations 1931 (SR&O 1931/359)
- Chromium Plating Regulations 1931 (SR&O 1931/455)
- Dudley, Brierley Hill and District Gas Order 1931 (SR&O 1931/645)
- Wombwell Gas Order 1931 (SR&O 1931/646)
- Gas Cylinders (Conveyance) Regulations 1931 (SR&O 1931/679)
- Sugar Factories Welfare Order 1931 (SR&O 1931/684)
- County Court Districts (Buxton and New Mills) Order 1931 (SR&O 1931/709)
- Southgate and District Gas Order 1931 (SR&O 1931/753)
- National Economy (National Health Insurance) Order 1931 (SR&O 1931/813)
- Unemployment Insurance (National Economy) (No. 1) Order 1931 (SR&O 1931/814)
- Unemployment Insurance (National Economy) (No. 2) Order 1931 (SR&O 1931/853)
- North Sunderland Harbour Order 1931 (SR&O 1931/928)
- Evesham Joint Hospital Order 1931 (SR&O 1931/939)

== 1932 ==
- Post Office Register (Trustee Savings Banks) Regulations 1932 (SR&O 1932/11)
- County of Middlesex Light Railway (Extension) Order 1932 (SR&O 1932/38)
- Parts of Holland (Alteration of Districts and Parishes) Order 1932 (SR&O 1932/183)
- Sand Hutton Light Railway Company (Winding-Up) Order 1932 (SR&O 1932/310)
- County Court Districts (Miscellaneous No. 2) Order 1932 (SR&O 1932/490)
- Rotherham Gas Order 1932 (SR&O 1932/507)
- Staithes Harbour Order 1932 (SR&O 1932/630)
- County Court Districts (Cardiff and Barry) Order 1932 (SR&O 1932/709)
- Rotherham Gas (No. 2) Order 1932 (SR&O 1932/958)
- County Court Districts (Miscellaneous No. 3) Order 1932 (SR&O 1932/1018)
- Liverpool Gas Order 1932 (SR&O 1932/1089)

== 1933 ==
- Musk Rats (Prohibition of Importation and Keeping) Order 1933 (SR&O 1933/106)
- Palestine (Amendment) Order in Council 1933 (SR&O 1933/312)
- London Passenger Transport Act 1933 (Appointed Day) Order (No. 1) 1933 (SR&O 1933/634)
- Portugal (Extradition) Order in Council 1933 (SR&O 1933/678)
- Milk Marketing Scheme 1933 (SR&O 1933/789)
- Alkali, Works Regulation Order (Scotland) 1933 (SR&O 1933/878)
- North Norfolk Rivers Catchment Board (Stiffkey River Drainage District) Order 1933 (SR&O 1933/933)
- London Passenger Transport Act 1933 (Appointed Day) Order (No. 2) 1933 (SR&O 1933/934)
- London Passenger Transport Act 1933 (Appointed Day) Order (No. 3) 1933 (SR&O 1933/964)
- London Passenger Transport Act 1933 (Appointed Day) Order (No. 4) 1933 (SR&O 1933/1051)
- Reciprocal Enforcement of Judgments (General Application to His Majesty's Dominions, etc) Order 1933 (SR&O 1933/1073)
- London Passenger Transport Act 1933 (Appointed Day) Order (No. 5) 1933 (SR&O 1933/1082)
- London Passenger Transport Act 1933 (Appointed Day) Order (No. 6) 1933 (SR&O 1933/1115)
- London Passenger Transport Act 1933 (Appointed Day) Order (No. 7) 1933 (SR&O 1933/1139)
- Benefices (Purchase of Rights of Patronage) Rules 1933 (SR&O 1933/1148)
- London Passenger Transport Act 1933 (Appointed Day) Order (No. 8) 1933 (SR&O 1933/1181)
- Potato Marketing Scheme (Approval) Order (Great Britain) 1933 (SR&O 1933/1186)
- London Passenger Transport Act 1933 (Appointed Day) Order (No. 9) 1933 (SR&O 1933/1191)
- County of Worcester Review Order 1933 (SR&O 1933/1243)

== 1934 ==
- London Passenger Transport Act 1933 (Appointed Day) Order (No. 10) 1934 (SR&O 1934/82)
- River Lee Conservancy Catchment Board (Abolition of Internal Drainage Districts) Order 1934 (SR&O 1934/92)
- London Passenger Transport Act 1933 (Appointed Day) Order (No. 11) 1934 (SR&O 1934/161)
- County Court Districts (Romford and Ilford) Order 1934 (SR&O 1934/473)
- Apple Capsid (Essex) (Amendment) Order 1934 (SR&O 1934/244)
- Docks Regulations 1934 (SR&O 1934/279)
- Ipswich and Stowmarket Navigation Acts Revocation Order 1934 (SR&O 1934/282)
- River Blyth Navigation Act Revocation Order 1934 (SR&O 1934/283)
- Wallasey Corporation Tramways (Cesser of Power) Order 1934 (SR&O 1934/354)
- Wincham Light Railway Order 1934 (SR&O 1934/362)
- London Passenger Transport Act 1933 (Appointed Day) Order (No. 12) 1934 (SR&O 1934/563)
- London Passenger Transport Act 1933 (Appointed Day) Order (No. 13) 1934 (SR&O 1934/627)
- London Passenger Transport Act 1933 (Appointed Day) Order (No. 14) 1934 (SR&O 1934/628)
- Fruit Tree Pests (Isle of Ely) Order 1934 (SR&O 1934/631)
- River Waveney (Extinguishment of Navigation Rights) Order 1934 (SR&O 1934/673)
- Air Force Reserve (Pilots and Observers) Order 1934 (SR&O 1934/692)
- London Passenger Transport Act 1933 (Appointed Day) Order (No. 15) 1934 (SR&O 1934/827)
- Appeals from County Courts Order 1934 (SR&O 1934/839)
- London Passenger Transport Act 1933 (Appointed Day) Order (No. 16) 1934 (SR&O 1934/931)
- London Passenger Transport Act 1933 (Appointed Day) Order (No. 17) 1934 (SR&O 1934/975)
- Romney and Denge Marsh Main Drains Catchment Board (Romney Marsh Level, Denge and Southbrooks and Level of New Romney Internal Drainage Districts) Order 1934 (SR&O 1934/1053)
- London Passenger Transport Act 1933 (Appointed Day) Order (No. 18) 1934 (SR&O 1934/1202)
- Fruit Tree Pests (Cambridgeshire) Order 1934 (SR&O 1934/1314)
- Unemployment Insurance (Removal of Difficulties) Order 1934 (SR&O 1934/1324)
- London Cab Order 1934 (SR&O 1934/1346)
- London Passenger Transport Act 1933 (Appointed Day) Order (No. 19) 1934 (SR&O 1934/1365)
- Metropolitan Traffic Area (Drivers' and Conductors' Licences) Order 1934 (SR&O 1934/1400)
- Merchant Shipping Safety Convention (Isle of Man) Order 1934 (SR&O 1934/1414)
- North Norfolk Rivers Catchment Board (River Burn Drainage District) Order 1934 (SR&O 1934/1474)

== 1935 ==
- Palestine (Amendment) Order in Council 1935 (SR&O 1935/151)
- County Court Districts (Miscellaneous No. 1) Order 1935 (SR&O 1935/264)
- Merchant Shipping Safety Convention (Guernsey) No. 1 Order 1935 (SR&O 1935/562)
- Merchant Shipping Safety Convention (Guernsey) No. 2 Order 1935 (SR&O 1935/563)
- Workmen's Compensation (Medical Referees) Order 1935 (SR&O 1935/567)
- Borough of Barnsley (Scale of Water Charges) Order 1935 (SR&O 1935/588)
- Switzerland (Extradition) Order in Council 1935 (SR&O 1935/676)
- Merchant Shipping Safety Convention (Straits Settlements) No. 2 Order 1935 (SR&O 1935/716)
- River Derwent Navigation Act Revocation Order 1935 (SR&O 1935/978)
- County Court (Alteration of Names) Order 1935 (SR&O 1935)/1203)
- Poisons (Approved Institutions) Order 1935 (SR&O 1935/1240)

== 1936 ==
- National Health Insurance (Extension of Enactments to Northern Ireland) Order 1936 (SR&O 1936/177)
- Wandsworth and District Gas Order 1936 (SR&O 1936/272)
- Denmark (Extradition) Order in Council 1936 (SR&O 1936/405)
- Inland Post Warrant 1936 (SR&O 1936/618)
- County Court Rules 1936 (SR&O 1936/626) (L. 17)
- County Courts Act 1934 (Date of Commencement) Order 1936 (SR&O 1936/694)
- Wandsworth and District Gas (No. 2) Order 1936 (SR&O 1936/783)
- Caistor Canal Act Revocation Order 1936 (SR&O 1936/1010)
- Doncaster, Rotherham and Wakefield Extension Order 1936 (SR&O 1936/1127)
- County Court Districts (Name of Court) Order 1936 (SR&O 1936/1131)
- County Court Districts (Greenwich and Woolwich) Order 1936 (SR&O 1936/1301)
- Bath Gas (No. 2) Special Order 1936 (SR&O 1936/1336)
- Order in Council dated 18 December 1936 approving a scale of distribution of salvage awards. (SR&O 1936/1385)

== 1937 ==
- Order in Council (No. 30) prohibiting the Manufacture, Importation, Keeping, Conveyance or Sale of Acetylene when an Explosive as defined by the Order. (SR&O 1937/54)
- Palestine (Defence) Order in Council 1937 (SR&O 1937/225)
- Government of India (Adaptation of Acts of Parliament) Order 1937 (SR&O 1937/230)
- Grey Squirrels (Prohibition of Importation and Keeping) Order 1937 (SR&O 1937/478)
- Conway Gas (Charges) Order 1937 (SR&O 1937/641)
- Palestine (Admiralty Jurisdiction) Order in Council 1937 (SR&O 1937/739)
- County Court Districts (Miscellaneous) Order 1937 (SR&O 1937/1073)
- Matrimonial Causes Rules 1937 (SR&O 1937/1113)
- Newcastle-upon-Tyne and Gateshead Gas Order 1937 (SR&O 1937/1186)

== 1938 ==
- Kiers Regulations 1938 (SR&O 1938/106)
- Epizootic Lymphangitis Order 1938 (SR&O 1938/193)
- Pleuro-Pneumonia (Amendment) Order 1938 (SR&O 1938/195)
- Glanders or Farcy Order 1938 (SR&O 1938/228)
- Public Health (Aircraft) Regulations 1938 (SR&O 1938/299)
- County Court (Districts) Order 1938 (SR&O 1938/470)
- Gasholders (Record of Examinations) Order 1938 (SR&O 1938/598)
- Factories Act (Docks, Building and Engineering Construction, etc.) Modification Regulations 1938 (SR&O 1938/610)
- Sanitary Accommodation Regulations 1938 (SR&O 1938/611)
- Hyde Gas Order 1938 (SR&O 1938/648)
- Chorley Gas Order 1938 (SR&O 1938/701)
- Hull Gas Order 1938 (SR&O 1938/711)
- London-Carlisle-Glasgow-Inverness Trunk Road (Cavendish Bridge and Shardlow Diversion) Order 1938 (SR&O 1938/1244)
- Liverpool-Preston-Leeds Trunk Road (Burley-in-Wharfedale and Maple Grange Bypass) Order 1938 (SR&O 1938/1260)
- County of York, West Riding and County Borough of Sheffield (Alteration of Boundaries) Order 1938 (SR&O 1938/1596)

== 1939 ==
- County Court Districts (Crewe, Nantwich and Sandbach) Order 1939 (SR&O 1939/216)
- London-Fishguard Trunk Road (Haverfordwest By-pass) Order 1939 (SR&O 1939/377)
- Cinematograph Film Stripping Regulations 1939 (SR&O 1939/571)
- Palestine (Amendment) Order in Council 1939 (SR&O 1939/603)
- Rhondda Gas Order 1939 (SR&O 1939/798)
- Huddersfield Gas Order 1939 (SR&O 1939/801)
- Iceland (Extradition) Order in Council 1939 (SR&O 1939/825)
- Ministry of Supply (Transfer of Powers) (No. 1) Order 1939 (SR&O 1939/877)
- Promissory Oaths Order 1939 (SR&O 1939/916)
- Defence (General) Regulations 1939 (SR&O 1939/927)
- Defence (Finance) Regulations 1939 (SR&O 1939/950)
- Securities (Restrictions and Returns) Order 1939 (SR&O 1939/966)
- British Broadcasting Corporation Order 1939 (SR&O 1939/967)
- Emergency Powers (Colonial Defence) Order 1939 (SR&O 1939/968)
- Emergency Powers (Isle of Man Defence) Order 1939 (SR&O 1939/969)
- Emergency Powers (Jersey Defence) Order 1939 (SR&O 1939/970)
- Emergency Powers (Guernsey Defence) Order 1939 (SR&O 1939/971)
- Defence (General) Regulations (Miscellaneous Amendments) Order 1939 (SR&O 1939/978)
- Fuel and Lighting Order 1939 (SR&O 1939/1028)
- Control of Timber (No. 1) Order 1939 (SR&O 1939/1031)
- Defence (Finance) Regulations (Isle of Man) 1939 (SR&O 1939/1048)
- Defence (Finance) Regulations Amendment Order 1939 (SR&O 1939/1067)
- Defence Regulations (Isle of Man) 1939 (SR&O 1939/1068)
- Defence (Savings Banks) Regulations 1939 (SR&O 1939/1113)
- Ministry of National Service Order 1939 (SR&O 1939/1118)
- Control of Timber (No. 2) Order 1939 (SR&O 1939/1183)
- Defence (Finance) Regulations (Isle of Man) Amendment Order 1939 (SR&O 1939/1186)
- China (Emergency) Order in Council 1939 (SR&O 1939/1190)
- Trading with the Enemy (Custodian) Order 1939 (SR&O 1939/1198)
- Persian Gulf States (Emergency) Order in Council 1939 (SR&O 1939/1203)
- Control of Timber (No. 3) Order 1939 (SR&O 1939/1217)
- Defence (War Risks Insurance) Regulations 1939 (SR&O 1939/1235)
- Defence (Savings Banks) Regulations Amendment Order 1939 (SR&O 1939/1236)
- Defence (Agriculture and Fisheries) Regulations 1939 (SR&O 1939/1303)
- Defence (Armed Forces) Regulations 1939 (SR&O 1939/1304)
- Control of Timber (No. 4) Order 1939 (SR&O 1939/1329)
- Defence (Summer Time) Regulations 1939 (SR&O 1939/1379)
- Defence (Local Government) (Scotland) Regulations 1939 (SR&O 1939/1380) (S. 97)
- Defence (Grants and Loans) Regulations 1939 (SR&O 1939/1381)
- Administration of Estates by Consular Officers (Finland) Order in Council 1939 (SR&O 1939/1452)
- Administration of Estates by Consular Officers (Thailand) Order in Council 1939 (SR&O 1939/1457)
- Administration of Estates by Consular Officers (Turkey) Order in Council 1939 (SR&O 1939/1458)
- Defence (Finance) Regulations (Amendment) (No. 2) Order 1939 (SR&O 1939/1620)
- Defence (General) Regulations (Miscellaneous Amendments) Order 1939 (SR&O 1939/1681)
- Control of Wool (No. 10) Order 1939 (SR&O 1939/1792)
- Defence (Finance) Regulations (Isle of Man) Amendment (No. 2) Order 1939 (SR&O 1939/1795)
- Control of Timber (No. 6) Order 1939 (SR&O 1939/1796)
- House to House Collections (Scotland) Order 1939 (SR&O 1939/1798)
- Potato Marketing Scheme 1933 (Modification and Suspension) Order 1939 (SR&O 1939/1876)
- Persian Gulf States (Emergency) (Amendment) Order in Council 1939 (SR&O 1939/1921)

== 1940 ==
- Defence (Agriculture and Fisheries) (Northern Ireland) Regulations 1940 (SR&O 1940/33)
- Trading with the Enemy (Channel Islands) Order in Council 1940 (SR&O 1940/87)
- Trading with the Enemy (Isle of Man) Order in Council 1940 (SR&O 1940/88)
- Trading with the Enemy (Custodian) (Amendment) Order 1940 (SR&O 1940/94)
- Control of Employment (Advertisements) Order 1940 (SR&O 1940/522)
- Gibraltar Prize Court (Fees) Order in Council 1940 (SR&O 1940/604)
- Trading with the Enemy (Custodian) Amendment (No. 2) Order 1940 (SR&O 1940/734)
- Defence (Local Defence Volunteers) Regulations 1940 (SR&O 1940/748)
- Defence (Petroleum) Regulations 1940 (SR&O 1940/749)
- Defence (Parliamentary Under-Secretaries) Regulations 1940 (SR&O 1940/761)
- Defence (War Risks Insurance) Regulations 1940 (SR&O 1940/771)
- Undertakings (Restriction on Engagement) Order (SR&O 1940/877)
- Trading with the Enemy (Custodian) (Amendment) (Channel Islands) Order 1940 (SR&O 1940/883)
- Dock Labour (Compulsory Registration) Order 1940 (SR&O 1940/1013)
- Defence (Administration of Justice) Regulations 1940 (SR&O 1940/1028)
- Defence (Reciprocal Enforcement) Order 1940 (SR&O 1940/1036)
- Defence (Trading with the Enemy) Regulations 1940 (SR&O 1940/1092)
- Trading with the Enemy Investment Order 1940 (SR&O 1940/1113)
- Defence (General) Regulations (Amendment) Order 1940 (SR&O 1940/1134)
- Defence (Building Societies) Regulations 1940 (SR&O 1940/1137)
- Defence (War Risks Insurance) (No. 2) Regulations 1940 (SR&O 1940/1142)
- Defence (Cinematograph Quotas) Regulations 1940 (SR&O 1940/1174)
- Defence (Evacuated Areas) Regulations 1940 (SR&O 1940/1209)
- Emergency Powers (Channel Islands) Order 1941 (SR&O 1941/1209)
- Defence (Encouragement of Exports) Regulations 1940 (SR&O 1940/1210)
- Palestine (Amendment) Order in Council 1940 (SR&O 1940/1212)
- Defence (Companies) Regulations 1940 (SR&O 1940/1213)
- Defence (War Risks Insurance) (No. 3) Regulations 1940 (SR&O 1940/1288)
- Conditions of Employment and National Arbitration Order (SR&O 1940/1305)
- Factories (Medical and Welfare Services) Order 1940 (SR&O 1940/1325)
- Visiting Forces (British Commonwealth) (Application to the Colonies, &c) Order in Council 1940 (SR&O 1940/1373)
- Trading with the Enemy (Insolvency) Order 1940 (SR&O 1940/1419)
- Defence (War Zone Courts) Regulations 1940 (SR&O 1940/1444)
- Defence (War Zone Courts) (Scotland) Regulations 1940 (SR&O 1940/1445)
- Industrial Registration Order 1940 (SR&O 1940/1459)
- Defence (War Risks Insurance) (No. 4) Regulations 1940 (SR&O 1940/1616)
- Falkland Islands Prize Court (Fees) Order in Council 1940 (SR&O 1940/1780)
- Defence (Bodies Corporate and Trade Unions) Regulations 1940 (SR&O 1940/1884)
- Billingshurst Gas Order 1940 (SR&O 1940/1915)
- Factories (Canteens) Order 1940 (SR&O 1940/1993)
- Compressed Gas Cylinders (Fuel for Motor Vehicles) Regulations 1940 (SR&O 1940/2009)
- Variation of Traffic Areas (Scotland) Order 1940 (SR&O 1940/2073)
- Visiting Forces (Royal New Zealand Air Force) Order 1940 (SR&O 1940/2199)

== 1941 ==
- County Court Districts (Knighton) Order 1941 (SR&O 1941/176)
- Docks (Provision of Canteens) Order 1941 (SR&O 1941/202)
- Industrial Registration (No. 1) Order 1941 (SR&O 1941/239)
- Post Office Register (Trustee Savings Banks) Regulations 1941 (SR&O 1941/253)
- Essential Work (General Provisions) Order 1941 (SR&O 1941/302)
- Registration for Employment Order 1941 (SR&O 1941/368)
- Civilian Clothing Order 1941 (SR&O 1941/402)
- Defence (Women's Forces) Regulations 1941 (SR&O 1941/581)
- Merchant Navy Order 1941 (SR&O 1941/634)
- Trading with the Enemy (Custodian) (Amendment) Order 1941 (SR&O 1941/765)
- Defence (War Zone Courts) (Northern Ireland) Regulations 1941 (SR&O 1941/984)
- Defence (National Fire Service) Regulations 1941 (SR&O 1941/1133)
- Purchase Tax (Reduction of Registration Limit) Order 1941 (SR&O 1941/1389)
- Defence (Enemy Currency) Regulations 1941 (SR&O 1941/1401)
- Dock Labour Order 1941 (SR&O 1941/1440)
- Defence (Patents, Trade Marks, etc.) Regulations 1941 (SR&O 1941/1780)
- Fuel and Lighting (Coal) Order 1941 (SR&O 1941/1920)
- Defence (National Fire Service) Regulations 1941 (SR&O 1941/2054)
- Defence (Functions of Ministers) Regulations 1941 (SR&O 1941/2057)
- Defence (Fire Brigades) (Northern Ireland) Regulations 1941 (SR&O 1941/2058)
- Defence (Auxiliary Coastguard) Regulations 1941 (SR&O 1941/2059)
- Registration of Boys and Girls Order 1941 (SR&O 1941/2146)

== 1942 ==
- Employment of Women (Control of Engagement) Order 1942 (SR&O 1942/100)
- Visiting Forces (Military Courts-Martial) Order 1942 (SR&O 1942/270)
- Trading with the Enemy (Custodian) (No. 2) Order 1942 (SR&O 1942/342)
- Defence (Recovery of Fines) Regulations 1942 (SR&O 1942/963)
- Pencils (Control of Manufacture and Supply) Order 1942 (SR&O 1942/984)
- Domestic Pottery (Manufacture and Supply) Order 1942 (SR&O 1942/1038)
- Ministers of the Crown (Minister of Fuel and Power) Order 1942 (SR&O 1942/1132)
- Defence (Recovery of Fines) (Scotland) Regulations 1942 (SR&O 1942/1143)
- Emergency Powers (Defence), Food (Wine and Spirits) Order 1942 (SR&O 1942/1271)
- Electric Torch and Lamp Cases Order 1942 (SR&O 1942/1300)
- Emergency Powers (Straits Settlements Defence) Order 1942 (SR&O 1942/1374)
- Defence (Amalgamation of Police Forces) Regulations 1942 (SR&O 1942/1443)
- Defence (Burial, Inquests and Registration of Deaths) Regulations 1942 (SR&O 1942/1444)
- Miscellaneous Goods (Prohibition of Manufacture and Supply) Order 1942 (SR&O 1942/1451)
- Domestic Furniture (Control of Manufacture and Supply) Order 1942 (SR&O 1942/1452)
- Electrical Appliances (Control of Manufacture and Supply) Order 1942 (SR&O 1942/1453)
- Floor Coverings (Control of Manufacture and Supply) Order 1942 (SR&O 1942/1454)
- Fountain Pens (Control of Manufacture and Supply) Order 1942 (SR&O 1942/1455)
- Hollow-ware and Kitchen Hardware (Control of Manufacture and Supply) Order 1942 (SR&O 1942/1456)
- Mechanical Lighters (Control of Manufacture and Supply) Order 1942 (SR&O 1942/1457)
- Metal Furniture (Control of Manufacture and Supply) Order 1942 (SR&O 1942/1458)
- Musical Instruments (Control of Manufacture and Supply) Order 1942 (SR&O 1942/1459)
- Umbrellas (Control of Manufacture and Supply) Order 1942 (SR&O 1942/1461)
- Control of Paper (No. 48) Order 1942 (SR&O 1942/1817)
- Domestic Furniture (Control of Manufacture and Supply) (No. 2) Order 1942 (SR&O 1942/2214)
- Building and Engineering Works of Construction (Young Persons) Order 1942 (SR&O 1942/2269)
- Domestic Furniture (Control of Manufacture and Supply) (No. 3) Order 1942 (SR&O 1942/2581)
- Defence (United States Forces–Administration of Estates) Regulations 1942 (SR&O 1942/2562)
- Electric Incandescent Lamps (Control) Order 1942 (SR&O 1942/2621)
- British Seamen's Identity Cards Order 1942 (SR&O 1942/2681)

== 1943 ==
- Hearth Furniture (Control of Manufacture and Supply) Order 1943 (SR&O 1943/125)
- Metal Furniture (Control of Manufacture and Supply) (No. 2) Order 1943 (SR&O 1943/138)
- Miscellaneous Goods (Prohibition of Manufacture and Supply) (No. 3) Order 1943 (SR&O 1943/149)
- Defence (Industrial Assurance) Regulations 1943 (SR&O 1943/308)
- Domestic Furniture (Control of Manufacture and Supply) (No. 4) Order 1943 (SR&O 1943/416)
- Nurses and Midwives (Registration for Employment) Order 1943 (SR&O 1943/511)
- Control of Engagement (Directed Persons) Order 1943 (SR&O 1943/651)
- Welsh Courts (Oaths and Interpreters) Rules 1943 (SR&O 1943/683)
- Trading with the Enemy (Authorisation) Order 1943 (SR&O 1943/822)
- Defence (Fire Guard) Regulations 1943 (SR&O 1943/916)
- Defence (Game) Regulations 1943 (SR&O 1943/1033)
- Control of Employment (Notice of Termination of Employment) Order 1943 (SR&O 1943/1173)
- Defence (Sale of Food) Regulations 1943 (SR&O 1943/1553)
- Domestic Furniture (Control of Manufacture and Supply) (No. 5) Order 1943 (SR&O 1943/1611)
- Trading with the Enemy (Enemy Territory) (Cessation) Order 1943 (SR&O 1943/1684)
- Trading with the Enemy (Corsica) Order 1943 (SR&O 1943/1685)

== 1944 ==
- Coalmining (Training and Medical) Order 1944 (SR&O 1944/7)
- Trading with the Enemy (Authorisation) Order 1944 (SR&O 1944/76)
- Trading with the Enemy (China Custodian) Order in Council 1944 (SR&O 1944/100)
- County Court Districts (Miscellaneous) Order 1944 (SR&O 1944/113)
- Electricity (Factories Act) Special Regulations 1944 (SR&O 1944/739)
- Trading with the Enemy (Custodian) (Amendment) Order 1944 (SR&O 1944/914)
- Trading with the Enemy (Foreign Currency Accounts) Order 1944 (SR&O 1944/915)
- River Great Ouse Catchment Board (Little Thetford Internal Drainage District) Order 1943 (SR&O 1944/1181)
- Wages Board (Unlicensed Place of Refreshment) Order 1944 (SR&O 1944/1399)
- Emergency Powers (Channel Islands) Order 1944 (SR&O 1944/1483)

== 1945 ==
- Trading with the Enemy (Custodian) Order 1945 (SR&O 1945/43)
- Trading with the Enemy (Authorisation) (France and Monaco) Order 1945 (SR&O 1945/346)
- Trading with the Enemy (Transfer of Negotiable Instruments, etc) (France and Monaco) Order 1945 (SR&O 1945/347)
- Trading with the Enemy (Enemy Territory Cessation) (Channel Islands) Order 1945 (SR&O 1945/545)
- House of Commons (Redistribution of Seats) Order 1945 (SR&O 1945/701)
- Defence (War Risks Insurance) Regulations 1945 (SR&O 1945/738)
- Trading with the Enemy (Custodian) (Amendment) (Insurance) No 2 Order 1945 (SR&O 1945/850)
- Trading with the Enemy (Authorisation) (Belgium and Luxembourg) Order 1945 (SR&O 1945/858)
- Trading with the Enemy (Transfer of Negotiable Instruments, etc) (Belgium and Luxembourg) Order 1945 (SR&O 1945/859)
- Trading with the Enemy (Custodian) (No 2) Order 1945 (SR&O 1945/887)
- Trading with the Enemy (Authorisation) (Denmark) Order 1945 (SR&O 1945/960)
- Trading with the Enemy (Transfer of Negotiable Instruments, etc) (Denmark) Order 1945 (SR&O 1945/961)
- Trading with the Enemy (Transfer of Negotiable Instruments, etc) (Finland) Order 1945 (SR&O 1945/1031)
- Trading with the Enemy (Authorisation) (Greece) Order 1945 (SR&O 1945/1077)
- Trading with the Enemy (Transfer of Negotiable Instruments, etc) (Greece) Order 1945 (SR&O 1945/1078)
- Trading with the Enemy (Transfer of Negotiable Instruments, etc) (Italy) Order 1945 (SR&O 1945/1099)
- Trading with the Enemy (Authorisation) (Netherlands) Order 1945 (SR&O 1945/1117)
- Trading with the Enemy (Transfer of Negotiable Instruments, etc) (Netherlands) Order 1945 (SR&O 1945/1118)
- Trading with the Enemy (Authorisation) (Czechoslovakia) Order 1945 (SR&O 1945/1357)
- Trading with the Enemy (Transfer of Negotiable Instruments, etc) (Czechoslovakia) Order 1945 (SR&O 1945/1358)
- Trading with the Enemy (Custodian) (Amendment) (Czechoslovakia) Order 1945 (SR&O 1945/1359)
- Trading with the Enemy (Enemy Territory Cessation) (Norway) Order 1945 (SR&O 1945/1411)
- Trading with the Enemy (Custodian) (Amendment) (No 2) Order 1945 (SR&O 1945/1414)
- Trading with the Enemy (Enemy Territory Cessation) (Philippine Islands) Order 1945 (SR&O 1945/1445)
- Trading with the Enemy (Authorisation) (Yugoslavia) Order 1945 (SR&O 1945/1494)
- Trading with the Enemy (Transfer of Negotiable Instruments, etc) (Yugoslavia) Order 1945 (SR&O 1945/1495)
- Trading with the Enemy (Custodian) (No. 3) Order 1945 (SR&O 1945/1573)
- County Court Districts (Lampeter and Aberayron) Order 1945 (SR&O 1945/1603)
- Defence (Services for Industry) Regulations 1945 (SR&O 1945/1614)
- Commissioners of Works Act 1852 (Amendment) Order 1945 (SR&O 1945/1636)

== 1946 ==
- Trading with the Enemy (Enemy Territory Cessation) (China) Order 1946 (SR&O 1946/11)
- Bretton Woods Agreements Order 1946 (SR&O 1946/36)
- Bank of England (Appointed Day) Order 1946 (SR&O 1946/237)
- Patent Fuel Manufacture (Health and Welfare) Special Regulations 1946 (SR&O 1946/258)
- Trading with the Enemy (Transfer of Negotiable Instruments, etc) (Siam) Order 1946 (SR&O 1946/293)
- Principal Probate Registry (Non-Contentious Business) Order 1946 (SR&O 1946/320)
- Transfer of Functions (Various Commodities) Order 1946 (SR&O 1946/378)
- Aliens Order 1946 (SR&O 1946/395)
- Trading with the Enemy (Transfer of Negotiable Instruments, etc) Order 1946 (SR&O 1946/441)
- Post Office Register (Trustee Savings Banks) Regulations 1946 (SR&O 1946/460)
- Singapore Colony Order in Council 1946 (SR&O 1946/462)
- Wages Board (Unlicensed Place of Refreshment) (Amendment) Order 1946 (SR&O 1946/743)
- Trading with the Enemy (Authorisation) (French Indo-China) Order 1946 (SR&O 1946/816)
- Trading with the Enemy (Custodian) (Amendment) (French Indo-China) Order 1946 (SR&O 1946/817)
- Trading with the Enemy (Custodian) Order 1946 (SR&O 1946/1039)
- Trading with the Enemy (Custodian) (Specified Persons) Order 1946 (SR&O 1946/1040)
- Trading with the Enemy (Authorisation) Order 1946 (SR&O 1946/1042)
- Trading with the Enemy (Transfer of Negotiable Instruments, etc) (No. 2) Order 1946 (SR&O 1946/1043)
- Trading with the Enemy (Custodian) (Amendment) Order 1946 (SR&O 1946/1044)
- Trading with the Enemy (Authorisation) (Poland) Order 1946 (SR&O 1946/1059)
- Trading with the Enemy (Transfer of Negotiable Instruments, etc) (Poland) Order 1946 (SR&O 1946/1060)
- Trading with the Enemy (Custodian) (Amendment) (Poland) Order 1946 (SR&O 1946/1061)
- Merchant Shipping (Registration of New Zealand Government Ships) Order 1946 (SR&O 1946/1086)
- Provision of Free Milk Regulations 1946 (SR&O 1946/1293)
- Trading with the Enemy (Authorisation) (Netherlands East Indies) Order 1946 (SR&O 1946/1386)
- Trading with the Enemy (Custodian) (Amendment) (Netherlands East Indies) Order 1946 (SR&O 1946/1387)
- Trading with the Enemy (Transfer of Negotiable Instruments, etc) (Hungary) Order 1946 (SR&O 1946/1433)
- Prosecution of Offences Regulations 1946 (SR&O 1946/1467)
- Welsh Church (Burial Grounds) (Appointed Day) Order 1946 (SR&O 1946/1538)
- Trading with the Enemy (Enemy Territory Cessation) (Portuguese Timor) Order 1946 (SR&O 1946/1562)
- Trading with the Enemy (Enemy Territory Cessation) (Union of Soviet Socialist Republics) Order 1946 (SR&O 1946/1563)
- Trading with the Enemy (Custodian) (No. 2) Order 1946 (SR&O 1946/2141)

== 1947 ==
- Trading with the Enemy (Enemy Territory Cessation) (Dodecanese Islands) Order 1947 (SR&O 1947/461)
- Patents Rules 1947 (SR&O 1947/484)
- Cuckfield and Horsham Water Order 1947 (SR&O 1947/585)
- Order, dated April 28, 1947, made by the Treasury prescribing Securities under section 9 of the Land Settlement (Facilities) Act, 1919 (9 & 10 Geo. 5. c. 59) (SR&O 1947/790)
- Trading with the Enemy (Transfer of Negotiable Instruments, etc) (Roumania) Order 1947 (SR&O 1947/665)
- Compressed Acetylene Order 1947 (SR&O 1947/805)
- Transfer of Functions (Home-Grown Raw Wool) Order 1947 (SR&O 1947/984)
- Pensions Appeal Tribunals Act (Modification) Order 1947 (SR&O 1947/1143)
- Dock Workers (Regulation of Employment) Order 1947 (SR&O 1947/1189)
- London-Fishguard Trunk Road (Haverfordwest-Cardigan Road Junction Improvements) Order 1947 (SR&O 1947/1433)
- Gas Cylinders (Conveyance) Regulations 1947 (SR&O 1947/1594)
- Wages Board (Unlicensed Place of Refreshment) (Amendment) Order 1947 (SR&O 1947/1731)
- National Health Service (Superannuation) Regulations 1947 (SR&O 1947/1755)
- Agriculture Act 1947 (Commencement) Order 1947 (SR&O 1947/1767)
- Forth Pilotage Order 1947 (SR&O 1947/1938)
- Control of Engagement Order 1947 (SR&O 1947/2021)
- Trading with the Enemy (Transfer of Negotiable Instruments, etc) (General) Order 1947 (SR&O 1947/2088)
- Pottery (Health) Special Regulations 1947 (SR&O 1947/2161)
- Trading with the Enemy (Authorisation) (Austria) Order 1947 (SR&O 1947/2203)
- Trading with the Enemy (Transfer of Negotiable Instruments, etc) (Austria) Order 1947 (SR&O 1947/2204)
- County Court Districts (Newcastle Emlyn) Order 1947 (SR&O 1947/2262)
- Control of Turbo-alternators (No. 1) Order 1947 (SR&O 1947/2386)
- Transfer of Functions (Medical Supplies) Order 1947 (SR&O 1947/2472)
- Crown Proceedings Act 1947 (Commencement) Order 1947 (SR&O 1947/2527)
- House to House Collections Regulations 1947 (SR&O 1947/2662)
- Palestine (Amendment) Order in Council 1947 (SR&O 1947/2770)
- Lee Conservancy Catchment Board (Additional Functions) Regulations 1947 (SR&O 1947/2797)
