= Dublin and Lucan Steam Tramway =

Passenger rail line operational from 1880 to 1897

Dublin and Lucan Steam Tramway Company

Operation
- Locale: Dublin, Lucan
- Open: 1880
- Close: 1897 (in modified form, 1925)
- Status: Closed

Infrastructure
- Track gauge: 3 ft (914 mm)
- Propulsion system: Steam

Statistics
- Route length: 7 miles (11 km)
Dublin and Lucan Steam Tramway Company era: 1880–1897
- Track gauge: 3 ft (914 mm)
- Propulsion system: Steam
Dublin and Lucan Electric Railway Company era: 1897–1925
- Track gauge: 3 ft 6 in (1,067 mm)
- Propulsion system: Electric

The Dublin and Lucan Steam Tramway operated a 3 ft (914 mm) narrow gauge steam tramway service between Dublin and Lucan between 1880 and 1897. The company was renamed as the Dublin and Lucan Electric Railway Company as steam power was replaced by electricity in 1897. This service ran until 1925.

== Dublin and Lucan Steam Tramway ==
The first public reference to this tramway scheme was in the Irish Times on 19 April 1880, wherein it was reported that the County Dublin Grand Jury had a proposal before them for the building of the line.

The Dublin and Lucan Steam Tramway (DLST) was authorised by an Order in Council under the Tramways Act. A prospectus appeared in the Irish Times on 27 November 1880. The capital was £30,000, comprising 3,000 shares of £10 each, with borrowing powers of £10,000 on the debentures. The board of management comprised:

- Colonel Charles Colthurst Vesey, D.L., J.P. (chairman) (Lucan House)
- William Moran, J.P. (Vice Chairman) (St. Edmundsbury, Lucan)
- James Macken (of James Macken and Sons, Dublin and Chapelizod)
- John A. Walker (Trinity Street, Dublin)

Construction commenced on 23 December 1880 and work progressed rapidly such that construction to Chapelizod was complete mostly by 23 May 1881. Mostly on a roadside reservation, the initial services began to Chapelizod on 1 June 1881.

One of the steam trams they obtained was from the Nottingham company of Manlove, Alliott & Co. Ltd. to the patented design of Edward Perrett. It was delivered on a trial basis in the hope of inducing its purchase by the company. This vehicle was a double decker of 2-4-2 type, with vertical coke-fired boilers on the end platforms. The two cylinders and engine were positioned beneath the floor of the saloon. The vehicle weight was 9 tons (with passengers 10½ tons), and the price was £950.

By the time of the first half-yearly meeting of the new company on 5 July 1881, construction had reached Palmerstown and services began in November 1881. Two additional engines had been ordered from Kitson and Company, as well as passenger vehicles and wagons.

A depot was completed at Conyngham Road, opposite the terminus, on land known as the Long Meadows. There was some difficulty in the finance for the remaining section of the line. Eventually a loan of £10,000 was negotiated with the Commissioners of Public Works in Ireland and services began to Lucan on 20 February 1883.

On 11 August 1883 there was a fatal accident when Patrick Meade was badly injured after being partly run over. The driver, Thomas Barber and the conductor Michael Ward were charged with "the careless management of a steam tramway". At the inquest, it was learned that Meade had been swinging between two passenger carriages, and had fallen. The driver and conductor were exonerated.

The tramway was a victim of its own success. By 27 August, the company was attracting passengers beyond its capacity. It was stated that on some days, 200 people were left behind at Chapelizod for lack of room, despite 34 double journeys having been worked. Additional vehicles could not be obtained quickly from manufacturers due to heavy demand from companies in England resulting in a 5-month lead time for delivery.

By 1895 the tramway was in poor condition and the track needed relaying. Much damage had been done by vehicles other than the tramway engines, and it was decided to reconstruct the track on a raised formation above road level.

=== Lucan and Leixlip Steam Tramway ===
The Lucan, Leixlip and Celbridge Steam Tramway Company was established to build lines from the Lucan terminus to Leixlip and Celbridge (branching off just outside Leixlip). The principal promoters were Alexander Ward and Robert Parker Birkett, the concern having five directors. The capital was £25,000. The Lucan and Leixlip Steam Tramway (L&LST) extension was built, and operated between 1890 and 1898. Construction costs amounted to £8,850, the passenger vehicles totalling £300. A solitary locomotive supplied by Thomas Green & Son of Leeds (works no 169) of 1892 accounted for another £825. The Celbridge portion was never built.

The steam service between Lucan and Leixlip closed down at the end of October 1897. After it went into liquidation, its assets were sold at auction on 1 August 1899, including around 6160 yards of rails, two bogie passenger carriages, two other passenger carriages, two goods wagons, a locomotive engine, a water ram in the River Liffey and much other material The locomotive engine is understood to have been removed to Donegal.

== Dublin and Lucan Electric Railway ==
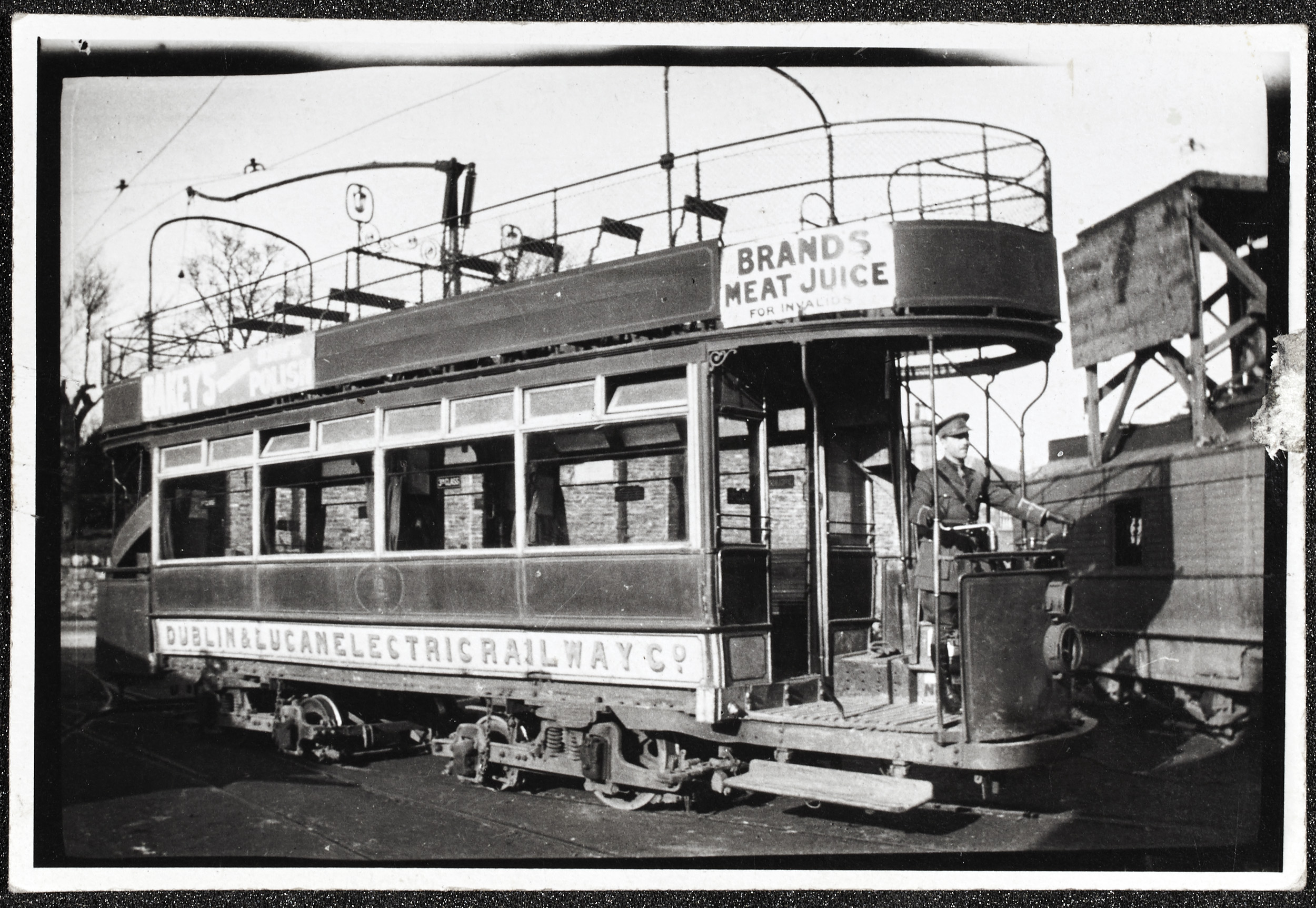
Dublin and Lucan Electric Railway tram

The Dublin and Lucan Electric Tramways Order 1900 (SR&O 1900/785), the DLST was electrified and regauged from 3 ft (914 mm) narrow gauge to 3 ft 6 in (1,067 mm) gauge and renamed the Dublin and Lucan Electric Railway Company (D&LER).

A power station was built on ground at Fonthill, equipped with two 100 h.p. steam driven dynamos to produce current for the line at 500 volts. Construction of the overhead equipment was awarded to Dick, Kerr & Co., who were also to supply five double-deck, open top bogie cars. The bodies for these cars were constructed by G.F. Milnes & Co.

The newly electrified line was inspected by an officer of the Board of Trade and services started on 8 March 1900. Cars ran at 45-minute intervals from 8.00 am to 10.15 pm.

The cars were numbered 12 to 16 inclusive, the former steam stock in the series being re-numbered. The company title was displayed on the rocker panels in full. In 1903, car 13 was fitted with a covered top of short canopy type. However, this was removed to comply with Board of Trade regulations.

Car 17 was obtained from British Thomson-Houston as a locomotive for goods haulage. This was rebuilt in 1918 and renumbered 26.

In 1906 another double-deck car was obtained from Milnes Voss of Birkenhead.

A new line was laid close to the original steam line, over a decade later, under an Order in Council, the Lucan and Leixlip Electric Railway Order 1910 (SR&O 1910/1316), by a completely new company. Despite the name, this does not seem to have followed the full distance to Leixlip but rather only the 0.5 miles (0.80 km) to the Spa Hotel at Doddsborough. This was opened as an electric line in 1910, and was leased to the (D&LER) in August 1911.

Legally a railway, it was taken over and supported by the government during World War I under the Defence of the Realm Act 1914 (DORA). However, this ended in 1921 and facing increasing competition from the Tower Bus Co., the D&LER's financial position deteriorated.

When the DUTC bought up the insolvent D&LER, they also purchased the L&LER from its shareholders, and although required to refit and reopen it in like manner, following objections from Dublin County Council the extension beyond Lucan was not reopened.

== Interconnection of the Lucan / Leixlip and city trams ==
The Lucan tram & terminus (left) & DUTC tram & terminus (right), Phoenix Park Gate

While not originally connected, the Dublin terminus of the Lucan line was 12 yards from the Park Gate terminus of the DUTC lines, on Conyngham Road, and the two were connected after the purchase by the DUTC.

== Closure ==
In January 1925, after their failure to be amalgamated into the GSR under the Railways Act 1924, the line was closed, going into liquidation. Following discussions, and enabled by two acts of the Irish Free State, the D&LER was bought up by the DUTC. The lines were regauged to Dublin's 5 ft 3 in (1,600 mm) only as far as Lucan, a new line was constructed in Chapelizod, and it reopened as a DUTC route in 1928.
