= National Service Act 1948 =

Act of the Parliament of the United Kingdom

National Service Act 1948 (Note: Section 62(1).)
- Act of Parliament
- Parliament of the United Kingdom
- Long title: An Act to consolidate the National Service Acts, 1939 to 1947, and the Reinstatement in Civil Employment Act, 1944, so far as that Act applies to persons called up for national service after the thirty-first day of December, nineteen hundred and forty-eight.
- Citation: 11 & 12 Geo. 6. c. 64
- Territorial extent: United Kingdom

Dates
- Royal assent: 30 July 1948
- Commencement: 1 January 1948 (Note: Section 62(2).)
- Repealed: 9 August 1985
Other legislation
Amends	See § Repealed enactments
Repeals/revokes	See § Repealed enactments
Amended by	National Service (Amendment) Act 1948; Statute Law Revision Act 1953; Auxiliary Forces Act 1953; Naval Discipline Act 1957; Statute Law (Repeals) Act 1977; Statute Law (Repeals) Act 1981
Repealed by	Reserve Forces (Safeguard of Employment) Act 1985

Status: Repealed

Text of statute as originally enacted

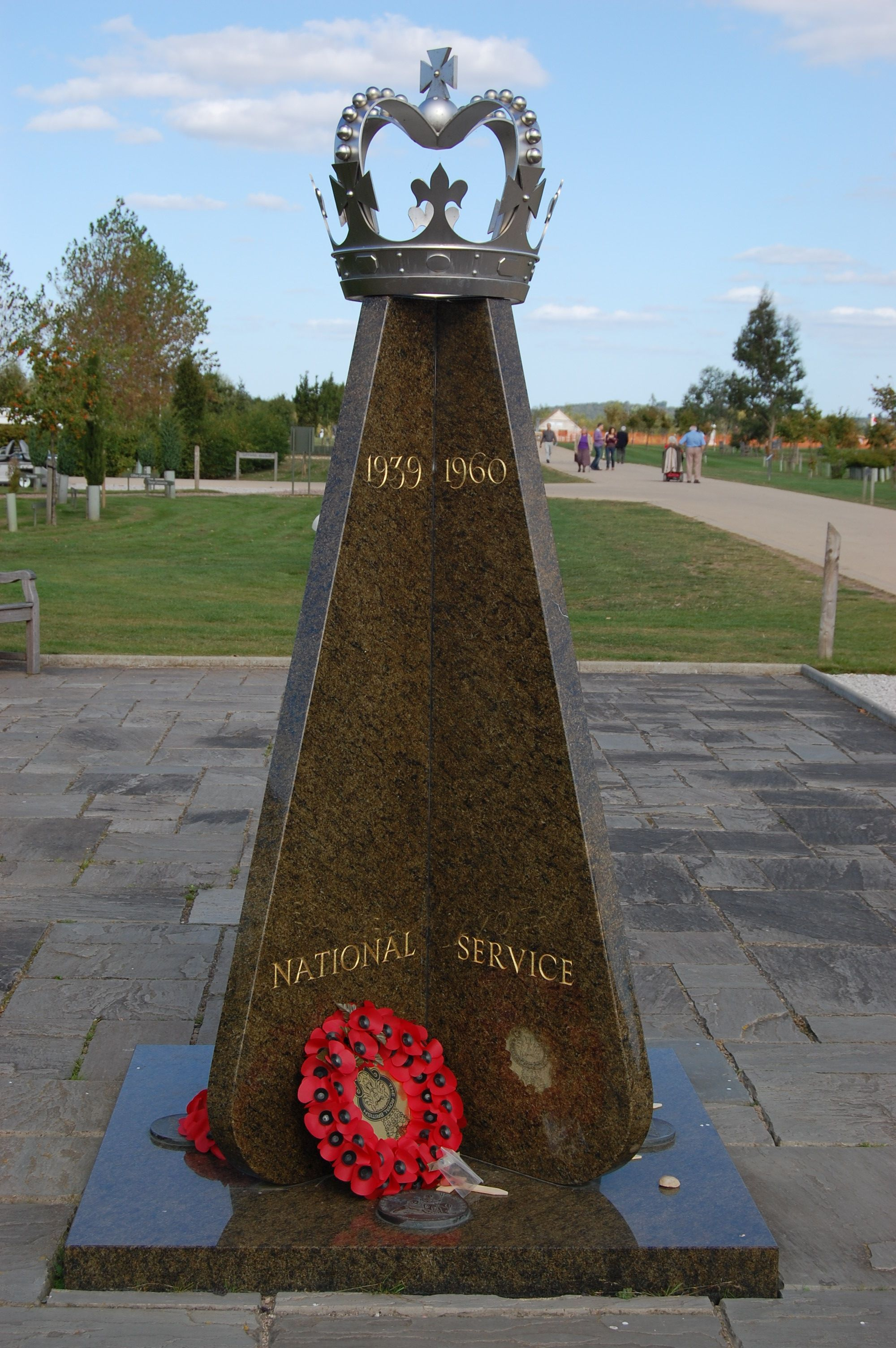
National Service (1939–1960) memorial at the National Memorial Arboretum

The National Service Act 1948 (11 & 12 Geo. 6. c. 64) was an act of the Parliament of the United Kingdom which extended the British conscription of the Second World War long after the war-time need for it had expired, in the form of "National Service". After a bill with the same purpose had been approved in 1947, expected to be implemented 1 January 1949, the Cold War and the Malayan Emergency caused a revised and extended version of the new legislation to be approved in December 1948, only days before the new arrangements came into force.

The act had much in common with the National Service (Armed Forces) Act 1939 (2 & 3 Geo. 6. c. 81), which it superseded, but its aim was to continue National Service even at times when the country was not at war. The National Service (Armed Forces) Act 1939 had not addressed this issue.

The act applied to all healthy young British men resident in Britain who were not registered as conscientious objectors. As before, women were not conscripted and exemption from service and registration of conscientious objectors was not changed.

== Background ==
In 1948, the UK Government realised the need for an armed forces larger than that which voluntary recruitment could provide. Discussions were soon started in parliament on a new National Service Act with a first such act being approved in July 1947. This first version was to come into force on 1 January 1949 and established the period of National Service to 12 months. However, financial crises, the advent of the Cold War and the Malayan Emergency caused the act to be amended before coming into force. The amendment was approved in December 1948, with the date in which it would come into force still being 1 January 1949.

== Provisions ==
=== Repealed enactments ===
Section 60(1) of the act repealed 6 enactments, listed in the sixth schedule to the act.

Citation	Short title	Extent of repeal
2 & 3 Geo. 6. c. 81	National Service (Armed Forces) Act 1939	The whole act.
4 & 5 Geo. 6. c. 15	National Service Act 1941	The whole act.
5 & 6 Geo. 6. c. 4	National Service (No. 2) Act 1941	The whole act.
6 & 7 Geo. 6. c. 3	National Service Act 1942	The whole act.
10 & 11 Geo. 6. c. 31	National Service Act 1947	The whole act.
11 & 12 Geo. 6. c. 25	Royal Marines Act 1948	Subsection (3) of section one.

== Differences from the previous act ==
The act changed the age range from 18–41 to 18-30, and increased the period of service required from 6 to 18 months. As with previous acts, men who completed the service remained on the reserve list for the number of years in the age-range (four years) which started being counted from the moment they finished serving. However, men on the reserve list could only be called for periods of up to 20 days (previous acts allowed the period to be indefinite), and could not be called more than three times.

The act also changed the trades considered essential services to the merchant navy, farming and coal mining (previously, essential services were coal mining, shipbuilding, engineering-related trades and—to a limited extent—medicine). Young men working in the essential services were exempted from National Service for a period of eight years. If they stopped working in these industries before this period of eight years ended (that is, before turning 25), they could be called up for National Service. Because of the political issues which would have arisen, there was no conscription in Northern Ireland.

== Korean War modifications of the act ==
In October 1950, in response to British involvement in the Korean War, the service period was extended to two years by the National Service Act 1950 (14 Geo. 6. c. 30), although this was waived for those who had been admitted to but would otherwise be unable to commence university courses in autumn 1950. Thereby, only a very few actually undertook 18 months of national service.

To compensate for those whose service was extended to two years, the reserve period was reduced by six months.

== Ending in 1963 ==
National Service ended gradually from 1957. It was decided that those born on or after 1 October 1939 would not be required, but conscription continued for those born earlier whose call-up had been delayed for any reason. In November 1960 the last men entered service, as call-ups formally ended on 31 December 1960, and the last National Servicemen left the armed forces in May 1963.

== Subsequent developments ==
The whole act was repealed by section 21(2)(b) of, and schedule 5 to, the Reserve Forces (Safeguard of Employment) Act 1985, which came into force on 9 August 1985.

== Calls for reintroduction ==
There have been occasional suggestions that conscription could be re-introduced, although this was not a likely possibility.

In 2015, Prince Harry made a call for bringing back national service. Following the launch of his 2009 film Harry Brown, English actor Michael Caine called for the reintroduction of national service in the UK to give young people "a sense of belonging rather than a sense of violence".

Shortly before the 2024 UK general election, which polls predicted the Conservative Party was very unlikely to win, Conservative Prime Minister Rishi Sunak proposed to reintroduce compulsory twelve-month full-time military or weekend community service for eighteen-year-old British people if the Conservative Party won the election; they lost badly.
