= National Service (Armed Forces) Act 1939 =

Act of the Parliament of the United Kingdom

National Service (Armed Forces) Act 1939 (Note: Section 24.)
- Act of Parliament
- Parliament of the United Kingdom
- Long title: An Act to make provision for securing and controlling the enlistment of men for service in the armed forces of the Crown; and for purposes connected with the matter aforesaid.
- Citation: 2 & 3 Geo. 6. c. 81
- Territorial extent: United Kingdom; Isle of Man (Note: Section 23.)

Dates
- Royal assent: 3 September 1939
- Commencement: 3 September 1939 (Note: The Acts of Parliament (Commencement) Act 1793.)
- Repealed: 10 February 1954
Other legislation
| Amended by | National Service (Armed Forces) Act 1940; National Service Act 1941; National Service Act 1942; National Service Act 1947 |
| Repealed by | National Service Act 1948; Navy, Army and Air Force Reserves Act 1954 |
| Relates to | Military Training Act 1939 |

Status: Repealed

Text of statute as originally enacted

National Service (Armed Forces) Act 1940 (Note: Section 2(1).)
- Act of Parliament
- Parliament of the United Kingdom
- Long title: An Act to provide that persons shall not be exempted from liability under the National Service (Armed Forces) Act, 1939, by reason of their being members of the Local Defence Volunteers.
- Citation: 3 & 4 Geo. 6. c. 22
- Territorial extent: United Kingdom

Dates
- Royal assent: 23 May 1940
- Commencement: 17 May 1940 (Note: Section 2(2).)
- Repealed: 1 January 1949
Other legislation
| Amends | National Service (Armed Forces) Act 1939 |
| Repealed by | National Service Act 1947 |

Status: Repealed

Text of statute as originally enacted

National Service Act 1941 (Note: Section 16(1).)
- Act of Parliament
- Parliament of the United Kingdom
- Long title: An Act to make provision for calling up men for civil defence and to amend the National Service (Armed Forces) Act, 1939.
- Citation: 4 & 5 Geo. 6. c. 15
- Territorial extent: United Kingdom

Dates
- Royal assent: 10 April 1941
- Commencement: 10 April 1941
- Repealed: 1 January 1948
Other legislation
| Amends | Emergency Powers (Defence) Act 1939; National Service (Armed Forces) Act 1939; Emergency Powers (Defence) Act 1940 |
| Amended by | National Service Act 1947 |
| Repealed by | National Service Act 1948 |

Status: Repealed

Text of statute as originally enacted

National Service Act 1942 (Note: Section 5(2).)
- Act of Parliament
- Parliament of the United Kingdom
- Long title: An Act to authorise the making of preparatory arrangements for the calling up of male persons who are about to become liable to be called up for service under the National Service Acts, 1939 to 1941, to simplify the making of proclamations for the purposes of those Acts, and to amend the provisions of those Acts relating to exemptions.
- Citation: 6 & 7 Geo. 6. c. 3
- Territorial extent: United Kingdom

Dates
- Royal assent: 17 December 1942
- Commencement: 17 December 1942
- Repealed: 1 January 1948
Other legislation
| Amends | Emergency Powers (Defence) Act 1939; National Service (Armed Forces) Act 1939 |
| Amended by | National Service Act 1947 |
| Repealed by | National Service Act 1948 |

Status: Repealed

Text of statute as originally enacted

The National Service (Armed Forces) Act 1939 (2 & 3 Geo. 6. c. 81) was an act of the Parliament of the United Kingdom passed on 3 September 1939, the day the United Kingdom declared war on Germany, starting the Second World War. The act, which superseded the Military Training Act 1939 (c. 25) of May 1939, enforced full conscription on all male British subjects between 18 and 41 who were present in Great Britain, subject to certain exemptions, and lasting until the end of "the present emergency". By a royal declaration in January 1941, the term Great Britain was extended to include the Isle of Man.

After the war ended, in September 1945, the act remained in force until 1948, when it was superseded by the National Service Act 1948 (11 & 12 Geo. 6. c. 64), which extended conscription to times when the country was not formally at war, thus covering the Cold War and the Malayan Emergency.

== Exemptions ==
- The medically unfit, blind, disabled, and those with mental disorders
- British subjects who had previously lived outside Britain (including the Isle of Man), and had lived in Britain for less than two years
- Students
- Persons employed by the government of any country of the British Empire except the United Kingdom
- Clergy of any denomination
- Conscientious objectors
- People working in reserved occupations such as baking, farming, medicine, and engineering.
- The act applied only to men present in Great Britain and the Isle of Man, exempting those living overseas.

== See also ==
- Administration of Justice (Emergency Provisions) Act 1939
