= Public Trustee Act 1906 =

Act of the Parliament of the United Kingdom

Public Trustee Act 1906 (Note: Section 17(1).)
- Act of Parliament
- Parliament of the United Kingdom
- Long title: An Act to provide for the appointment of a Public Trustee and to amend the Law relating to the administration of Trusts.
- Citation: 6 Edw. 7. c. 55
- Territorial extent: England and Wales (Note: Section 17(2).)

Dates
- Royal assent: 21 December 1906
- Commencement: 1 January 1908 (Note: Section 16.)
Other legislation
| Amended by | Statute Law Revision Act 1927; Criminal Justice Act 1948; Statute Law Revision Act 1964 |

Status: Amended

Text of statute as originally enacted

Revised text of statute as amended

Text of the Public Trustee Act 1906 as in force today (including any amendments) within the United Kingdom, from legislation.gov.uk.

The Public Trustee Act 1906 (6 Edw. 7. c. 55) is an act of the Parliament of the United Kingdom, which provides for the appointment of a public trustee, and which amended the law relating to the administration of trusts. This act has been described as "important".

== Passage ==
The bill for this act was the Public Trustee Bill.

== Subordinate legislation ==
The Public Trustee Rules 1907 (SR&O 1907/938), Public Trustee Rules 1912 (SR&O 1912/348), the Public Trustee Rules 1916 (SR&O 1916/489), the Public Trustee (Amendment) Rules 1983 (SI 1983/1050) and the Public Trustee (Amendment) Rules 1987 (SI 1987/2249) were made under this act, as were a number of Public Trustee (Custodian Trustee) Rules and Public Trustee (Fees) Orders.

== Section 2 ==
Section 2(1)(e) was repealed by section 83(3) of, and part I of the tenth schedule to, the Criminal Justice Act 1948.

== Section 7 ==
Section 7 of the act was repealed by section 1(1) of the Public Trustee (Liability and Fees) Act 2002.

== Section 8 ==
Sections 8(1) to (1C) were substituted for the original section 8(1) by section 1(3) of, and paragraph 1 of the schedule to, the Public Trustee and Administration of Funds Act 1986.

== Section 9 ==
Section 9(4) of the act was repealed by section 2(1)(c) of the Public Trustee (Liability and Fees) Act 2002.

== Subsequent developments ==
Section 16 of the act was repealed by section 1 of, and part I of the schedule to, the Statute Law Revision Act 1927 (17 & 18 Geo. 5. c. 42), which came into force on 22 December 1927.

== See also ==
- English trusts law

== Bibliography ==
- F G Champernowne and Henry Johnston, with John C G Bridge. The Public Trustee Act, 1906: with Introduction and Notes. Butterworth & Co. 1908. Google.
- K J Muir Mackenzie. The Public Trustee Act, 1906: with Rules, Fees and Official Forms, and a Commentary thereon and Notes for Practical Use. Waterlow and Sons. 1908. Google.
- Arthur Reginald Rudall and James William Grieg. The Public Trustee Act, 1906: with Notes and Observations thereon. Jordan and Sons Limited. London. 1907. Catalogue. Reviewed at (1907) 36 The Accountant 790 (8 June 1907); (1907) 29 The Law Students' Journal 143 (1 June 1907); and (1907) 65 The Economist 909 (25 May 1907).
- Arthur Reginald Rudall and James William Grieg. "The Public Trustee Act, 1906: with Explanatory Notes". The Law of Trusts and Trustees. Fourth Edition. Jordan & Sons. 1911. Pages 292 to 336. See also "Introduction to the Public Trustee Act, 1906" at pages xlv to liv. See further passim.
- T W Morgan. A Practical Analysis of the Public Trustee Act, 1906. Stevens and Haynes. London. 1907. Reviewed at 23 Law Quarterly Review 358.
- Strahan, "VI - The Public Trustee Act, 1906" (1908) 33 The Law Magazine and Review (Fifth Series) 68
- "The Public Trustee Act, 1906" (1908) 124 The Law Times 210 (4 January 1908)
- "The Public Trustee Act" (1907) 42 The Law Journal 16 (12 January 1907)
- "The Public Trustee Act, 1906" (1907) 36 The Accountant 129 (26 January 1907)
- "The Administration of the Public Trustee Act" (1908) 29 Journal of the Institute of Bankers 145; and see "The Public Trustee Act, 1906" at p 148
- "The Public Trustee Act, 1906" (1907) 68 Post Magazine and Insurance Monitor 886 (23 November 1907) and 904
- "Public Trustee Act, 1906" (1907) 26 Law Notes 54
- "The Public Trustee Bill" (1906) 50 The Solicitors' Journal 242 (10 February 1906) and 354 (31 March 1906) and 457 (12 May 1906) and 553 (23 June 1906) and 574 (30 June 1906); and see "Public Trustee Bill" at pp 344 (24 March 1906) and 442 (5 May 1906) and 638 (21 July 1906) and "Sir H Vincent's Public Trustee Bill" at p 281 (3 March 1906); and see also pages 249, 362, 433, 473, 654, 665 and 684.
- Sydney Edward Williams. Godefroi on the Law of Trusts and Trustees. Fourth Edition. Stevens and Sons. 1915. Appendix. Pages 713 to 724. See also pages 496, 529 and 632.
- Henry Godefroi, Whitmore L Richards and James Irvine Stirling. "Public Trustee Act, 1906". The Law Relating to Trusts and Trustees. Third Edition. Stevens and Sons. 1907. Appendix. Pages 1016 to 1024. See also pages iii and 978.
- Arthur Underhill. "The Public Trustee". The Law relating to Trusts and Trustees. Seventh Edition. Butterworth & Co. 1912. Chapter 8. Pages 411 to 424. See also pages 445 and 446.
- Halsbury's Statutes of England. Second Edition. Butterworth & Co (Publishers) Ltd. 1951. Volume 26. Pages 28 to 46. See also pages 10, 12, 25, 46, 122, 156, 168, 169, 586 and passim.
- Halsbury's Statutes of England. (The Complete Statutes of England). 1930. Volume 20: . Pages 79 to 90. See also pages 55, 91 and 160 and passim.
- W H Aggs. "Public Trustee Act, 1906". Chitty's Statutes of Practical Utility. Sixth Edition. Sweet and Maxwell. Stevens and Sons. 1913. Volume 15. Pages 279 to 288.
- J M Lely. "Public Trustee Act, 1906". Statutes of Practical Utility passed in 1906. Sweet and Maxwell. Stevens and Sons. 1907. Pages 950 to 959. Google
- James Sutherland Cotton (ed). "Public Trustee Act". The Practical Statutes of the Session 1906. Horace Cox. Law Times Office, Windsor House, Bream's Buildings, London. 1907. Page 305 et seq. Google
- Burn and Burnett Hall (eds), assisted by Bolland and Watts. "Public Trustee Act, 1906". The Annual Practice, 1949. 69th Annual Issue. Sweet and Maxwell. Stevens and Sons. Butterworth & Co (Publishers) Ltd. London. Volume 2. Pages 3488 to 3498. See also the other annual editions of this book.
- "Public Trustee Act, 1906". The Annual Practice 1930. 48th Annual Issue. Pages 2325 to 2335.
- "Public Trustee Act 1906". Civil Procedure. Volume 2. Sweet & Maxwell. 2003. Paragraph 6D-37 at page 1595 et seq.
- Public Trustee Act 1906. Practical Law. Thomson Reuters.
