= Emergency Powers (Defence) Act 1939 =

Act of the Parliament of the United Kingdom

Emergency Powers (Defence) Act 1939 (Note: Section 12.)
- Act of Parliament
- Parliament of the United Kingdom
- Long title: An Act to confer on His Majesty certain powers which it is expedient that His Majesty should be enabled to exercise in the present emergency; and to make further provision for purposes connected with the defence of the realm.
- Citation: 2 & 3 Geo. 6. c. 62
- Territorial extent: United Kingdom (Note: Also applies to British subjects, ships and aircraft if not in the British Empire. Capable of being extended to other parts of the British Empire by order in council.)

Dates
- Royal assent: 24 August 1939
- Commencement: 24 August 1939 (Note: Section 11(1).)
- Expired: 24 August 1940
- Repealed: 25 March 1959
Other legislation
| Amends | Official Secrets Act 1920 |
| Amended by | Emergency Powers (Defence) Act 1940; Emergency Powers (Defence) (No. 2) Act 1940; National Service Act 1941; National Service Act 1942; Emergency Powers (Defence) Act 1945; Statute Law Revision Act 1953; Ghana Independence Act 1957 |
| Repealed by | Emergency Laws (Repeal) Act 1959 |

Status: Repealed

Text of statute as originally enacted

The Emergency Powers (Defence) Act 1939 (2 & 3 Geo. 6. c. 62) was an act of the Parliament of the United Kingdom. The act was emergency legislation passed just prior to the outbreak of World War II by the Parliament of the United Kingdom to enable the British government to take up emergency powers to prosecute the war effectively. It contained clauses giving the government wide powers to create Defence Regulations by Order in Council. These regulations governed almost every aspect of everyday life in the country during the War. Two offences under the regulations (forcing safeguards and looting) were punishable with death. Following the conclusion of the war, the 1939 Act was repealed, with the individual regulations gradually following suit. As of 2023, at least one Regulation (relating to the use of service personnel to perform agricultural and other "urgent work of national importance") remains in force.

== Passage and effect ==
On 24 August 1939, following the announcement of the Nazi–Soviet Pact the previous day, the House of Commons was recalled from its summer recess to pass the Emergency Powers (Defence) Bill, which gave authority to implement the Defence Regulations. The act was originally intended to be in force for only one year, and made general provision for prosecuting the war effort. In particular, it provided for the following:

1. (1) Subject to the provisions of this section, His Majesty may by Order in Council make such Regulations (in this Act referred to as "Defence Regulations") as appear to him to be necessary or expedient for securing the public safety, the defence of the realm, the maintenance of public order and the efficient prosecution of any war [in which] His Majesty may be engaged, and for maintaining supplies and services essential to the life of the community.

(2) Without prejudice to the generality of the powers conferred by the preceding subsection, Defence Regulations may, so far as appears to His Majesty in Council to be necessary or expedient for any of the purposes mentioned in that subsection:-

(a) Make provision for the apprehension, trial, and punishment of persons offending against the Regulations and for the detention of persons whose detention appears to the Secretary of State to be expedient in the interests of the public safety or the defence of the realm;

(b) authorise -

(i) the taking of possession or control, on behalf of His Majesty, of any property or undertaking;
(ii) the acquisition, on behalf of His Majesty, of any property other than land;

(c) authorise the entering and searching of any premises; and

(d) provide for amending any enactment, for suspending the operation of any enactment, and for applying any enactment with or without modification.

[...]

(5) Nothing in this section shall authorise the imposition of any form of compulsory naval, military or air force service or any form of industrial conscription, or the making of provision for the trial by courts martial of persons not being persons subject to the Naval Discipline Act, to military law or to the Air Force Act.

The bill completed all its parliamentary stages, including royal assent, on that day. The question of compensation was not directly addressed by the bill, but the subsequent Compensation (Defence) Act 1939 (2 & 3 Geo. 6. c. 75) established a statutory compensation scheme in respect of land, vessels, vehicles, aircraft and other property a week later.

=== Extension to the Channel Islands ===
Emergency Powers (Jersey Defence) Order 1939
- Statutory Rules and Orders
- Parliament of the United Kingdom
- Citation: SR&O 1939/970

Dates
- Made: 25 August 1930
Other legislation
| Made under | Emergency Powers (Defence) Act 1939 |

Text of statute as originally enacted

Emergency Powers (Guernsey Defence) Order 1939
- Statutory Rules and Orders
- Parliament of the United Kingdom
- Citation: SR&O 1939/971

Dates
- Made: 25 August 1930
Other legislation
| Made under | Emergency Powers (Defence) Act 1939 |

Text of statute as originally enacted

The Emergency Powers (Jersey Defence) Order 1939 (SR&O 1939/970) and the Emergency Powers (Guernsey Defence) Order 1939 (SR&O 1939/971) extended the provisions of the act to the Channel Islands, allowing the States of Jersey and the Royal Court of Guernsey (respectively) to make defence regulations independently for their respective jurisdictions. They passed the Defence (Jersey) Regulations 1939 and the Defence Regulations (Guernsey) 1939.

Emergency Powers (Channel Islands) Order 1941
- Statutory Rules and Orders
- Parliament of the United Kingdom
- Citation: SR&O 1941/1209

Dates
- Made: 15 August 1941
Other legislation
| Made under | Emergency Powers (Defence) Act 1939; Emergency Powers (Jersey Defence) Order 1939; Emergency Powers (Guernsey Defence) Order 1939 |
| Repealed by | Emergency Powers (Channel Islands) Order 1944 |

Status: Revoked

Text of statute as originally enacted

Emergency Powers (Channel Islands) Order 1944
- Statutory Rules and Orders
- Parliament of the United Kingdom
- Citation: SR&O 1944/1483

Dates
- Made: 18 May 1944
Other legislation
| Repeals/revokes | Emergency Powers (Channel Islands) Order 1941 |
| Made under | Emergency Powers (Defence) Act 1939 |

Text of statute as originally enacted

Following the German occupation of the Channel Islands, their powers to make Defence Regulations were revoked on 15 August 1941 by the Emergency Powers (Channel Islands) Order 1941 (SR&O 1941/1209), and the power to make Defence Regulations for the islands was then held solely by the Privy Council. Following the end of the German occupation of the islands, the Emergency Powers (Channel Islands) Order 1944 (SR&O 1944/1483) restored the powers to make Defence Regulations to the island authorities, and conferred power to make regulations on the officer commanding the British armed forces in the islands.

=== Extension to the Isle of Man ===
Emergency Powers (Isle of Man Defence) Order 1939
- Statutory Rules and Orders
- Parliament of the United Kingdom
- Citation: SR&O 1939/969

Dates
- Made: 25 August 1939
Other legislation
| Made under | Emergency Powers (Defence) Act 1939 |

Text of statute as originally enacted

The Emergency Powers (Isle of Man Defence) Order 1939 (SR&O 1939/969) extended the power to make Defence Regulations to the Lieutenant Governor of the Isle of Man, Earl Granville.

=== Extension to colonies ===
Emergency Powers (Colonial Defence) Order 1939
- Statutory Rules and Orders
- Parliament of the United Kingdom
- Citation: SR&O 1939/968

Dates
- Made: 25 August 1939
Other legislation
| Made under | Emergency Powers (Defence) Act 1939 |

Text of statute as originally enacted

Emergency Powers (Straits Settlements Defence) Order 1942
- Statutory Rules and Orders
- Parliament of the United Kingdom
- Citation: SR&O 1942/1374

Dates
- Made: 1 July 1942
Other legislation
| Made under | Emergency Powers (Defence) Act 1939; Emergency Powers (Colonial Defence) Order 1939; Emergency Powers (Colonial Defence) (Explanation) Order 1942 |

Text of statute as originally enacted

The Emergency Powers (Colonial Defence) Order 1939 (SR&O 1939/968) granted powers to introduce local Defence Regulations to the governor of each British territory. Following the British withdrawal from Malaya and the capture of Singapore, the Emergency Powers (Straits Settlements Defence) Order 1942 (SR&O 1942/1374) transferred the power to make Defence Regulations for the Straits Settlements to the Governor of Ceylon, Andrew Caldecott, as the Governor of the Straits Settlements, Shenton Thomas, having been captured by Japan. A prerogative Order in Council provided a similar result for Hong Kong by transferring powers retrospective from the captured Governor of Hong Kong, Mark Aitchison Young, to the Secretary of State for the Colonies.

== Defence Regulations ==
The Defence Regulations were Orders in Council and could amend any primary or secondary legislation within the limits of the enabling acts to allow the effective prosecution of the war.

The regulations existed in draft form, constantly revised, throughout the years between the world wars. In early 1939 it was decided that since a war might break out without warning or without time to pass an act of Parliament to bring in emergency regulations, the regulations should be split into two codes. Code A would be needed immediately if war broke out and could be passed in peacetime, while Code B, containing more severe restrictions on civil liberties, would be brought in later. In order not to alert the public to the existence of Code B, Code A was simply numbered consecutively.

Defence (General) Regulations 1939
- Statutory Rules and Orders
- Parliament of the United Kingdom
- Citation: SR&O 1939/927
Other legislation
| Made under | Emergency Powers (Defence) Act 1939 |

Defence (General) Regulations (Miscellaneous Amendments) Order 1939
- Statutory Rules and Orders
- Parliament of the United Kingdom
- Citation: SR&O 1939/978
Other legislation
| Made under | Emergency Powers (Defence) Act 1939 |

Defence (General) Regulations (Miscellaneous Amendments) Order 1939
- Statutory Rules and Orders
- Parliament of the United Kingdom
- Citation: SR&O 1939/1681

Dates
- Made: 23 November 1939
Other legislation
| Made under | Emergency Powers (Defence) Act 1939 |

Text of statute as originally enacted

Defence (General) Regulations (Amendment) Order 1940
- Statutory Rules and Orders
- Parliament of the United Kingdom
- Citation: SR&O 1940/1134

Dates
- Made: 2 July 1940
Other legislation
| Made under | Emergency Powers (Defence) Act 1939; Emergency Powers (Defence) Act 1940 |

Text of statute as originally enacted

The main Defence Regulations were the Defence (General) Regulations 1939 (SR&O 1939/927), which implemented Code A and were brought into effect immediately. Code B followed on 1 September (the same day Nazi Germany invaded Poland) in the form of the Defence (General) Regulations (Miscellaneous Amendments) Order 1939 (SR&O 1939/978) and included Defence Regulation 18B, which provided a framework for internment. The 1939 regulations were amended dozens of times throughout the war, including by the Defence (General) Regulations (Miscellaneous Amendments) Order 1939 (SR&O 1939/1681), the Defence (General) Regulations (Amendment) Order 1940 (SR&O 1940/1134), in 1941 (adding Regulation 78) and in 1945 (adding Regulation 69D). By May 1945, some 377 Defence (General) Regulations had been created.

=== Specific topics ===
Other Defence Regulations covered narrower fields of life such as the:

Defence Regulations (Isle of Man) 1939
- Statutory Rules and Orders
- Parliament of the United Kingdom
- Citation: SR&O 1939/1068

Dates
- Made: 1 September 1939
Other legislation
| Made under | Emergency Powers (Defence) Act 1939; Emergency Powers (Isle of Man Defence) Order 1939 |

Text of statute as originally enacted

- Defence Regulations (Isle of Man) 1939 (SR&O 1939/1068)
  Extended the Defence (General) Regulations 1939 to the Isle of Man, with local adjustments.

Defence (Grants and Loans) Regulations 1939
- Statutory Rules and Orders
- Parliament of the United Kingdom
- Citation: SR&O 1939/1381

Dates
- Made: 5 October 1939
Other legislation
| Made under | Emergency Powers (Defence) Act 1939 |

Text of statute as originally enacted

- Defence (Grants and Loans) Regulations 1939 (SR&O 1939/1381)
  Allowed the Minister of Transport to discontinued grants from the Road Fund.

Defence (Armed Forces) Regulations 1939
- Statutory Rules and Orders
- Parliament of the United Kingdom
- Citation: SR&O 1939/1304

Dates
- Made: 28 September 1939
Other legislation
| Made under | Emergency Powers (Defence) Act 1939 |

Text of statute as originally enacted

- Defence (Armed Forces) Regulations 1939 (SR&O 1939/1304)
  Allowed members of the armed forces to be temporarily employed in agricultural or other urgent work.

Defence (Summer Time) Regulations 1939
- Statutory Rules and Orders
- Parliament of the United Kingdom
- Citation: SR&O 1939/1379

Dates
- Made: 5 October 1939
Other legislation
| Made under | Emergency Powers (Defence) Act 1939 |

Text of statute as originally enacted

- Defence (Summer Time) Regulations 1939 (SR&O 1939/1379)
  Extended the period of daylight savings during the summer months.

Defence (Finance) Regulations 1939
- Statutory Rules and Orders
- Parliament of the United Kingdom
- Citation: SR&O 1939/1620
Other legislation
| Made under | Emergency Powers (Defence) Act 1939 |

- Defence (Finance) Regulations 1939 (SR&O 1939/950, reissued with amendments SR&O 1939/1067, and SR&O 1939/1620)

Defence (Finance) Regulations (Isle of Man) 1939
- Statutory Rules and Orders
- Parliament of the United Kingdom
- Citation: SR&O 1939/1048
Other legislation
| Made under | Emergency Powers (Defence) Act 1939 |

- Defence (Finance) Regulations (Isle of Man) 1939 (SR&O 1939/969)

Defence (Agriculture and Fisheries) Regulations 1939
- Statutory Rules and Orders
- Parliament of the United Kingdom
- Citation: SR&O 1939/1303

Dates
- Made: 28 September 1939
Other legislation
| Made under | Emergency Powers (Defence) Act 1939 |

Text of statute as originally enacted

- Defence (Agriculture and Fisheries) Regulations 1939 (SR&O 1939/1303)
  Introduced powers for the government to control food production, direct agricultural labour, and manage fisheries

Defence (Savings Banks) Regulations 1939
- Statutory Rules and Orders
- Parliament of the United Kingdom
- Citation: SR&O 1939/1113

Dates
- Made: 21 September 1939
Other legislation
| Made under | Emergency Powers (Defence) Act 1939 |

Text of statute as originally enacted

- Defence (Savings Banks) Regulations 1939 (SR&O 1939/1113)

Defence (Local Government) (Scotland) Regulations 1939
- Statutory Rules and Orders
- Parliament of the United Kingdom
- Citation: SR&O 1939/1380

Dates
- Made: 5 October 1939
Other legislation
| Made under | Emergency Powers (Defence) Act 1939 |

Text of statute as originally enacted

- Defence (Local Government) (Scotland) Regulations 1939 (SR&O 1939/1380)

Defence (Administration of Justice) Regulations 1940 (Note: Section 20(1).)
- Statutory Rules and Orders
- Parliament of the United Kingdom
- Citation: SR&O 1940/1028
- Territorial extent: England and Wales (Note: Section 20(4).)

Dates
- Made: 19 June 1940
- Commencement: 19 June 1940
Other legislation
| Made under | Emergency Powers (Defence) Act 1940 |
| Amended by | Marine and Aviation Insurance (War Risks) Act 1952 |

Status: Amended

Text of statute as originally enacted

Text of the Emergency Powers (Defence) Act 1939 as in force today (including any amendments) within the United Kingdom, from legislation.gov.uk.

- Defence (Administration of Justice) Regulations 1940 (SR&O 1940/1028)
  Allowed courts in England and Wales to alter sittings if required by the hostilities, and relaxed rules on jurors and giving evidence in person.
- Defence (Administration of Justice) (Scotland) Regulations 1940 (SR&O 1940/1869)
  Allowed courts in Scotland to alter sittings if required by the hostilities, and relaxed rules on jurors and giving evidence in person.

Defence (Trading with the Enemy) Regulations 1940
- Statutory Rules and Orders
- Parliament of the United Kingdom
- Citation: SR&O 1940/1092

Dates
- Made: 26 June 1940
Other legislation
| Made under | Emergency Powers (Defence) Act 1939; Emergency Powers (Defence) Act 1940 |

Text of statute as originally enacted

- Defence (Trading with the Enemy) Regulations 1940 (SR&O 1940/1092).
  Amended the Trading with the Enemy Act 1939 (2 & 3 Geo. 6. c. 89).
- Defence (Agriculture and Fisheries) (Northern Ireland) Regulations 1940 (SR&O 1940/33)
  Suspended provisions of the Bacon Industry Act (Northern Ireland) 1939 (2 & 3 Geo. 6. c. 10 (N.I.)), and the Agricultural Marketing (Pig Industry) Act (Northern Ireland) 1934 (25 & 26 Geo. 5. c. 3 (N.I.)).
- Defence (Parliamentary Under-Secretaries) Regulations 1940 (SR&O 1940/761)
  Amended the Ministers of the Crown Act 1937 (1 Edw. 8. & 1 Geo. 6. c. 38) to increase the allowable number of Parliamentary Under-Secretaries for some ministries.
- Defence (War Risks Insurance) Regulations 1940 (SR&O 1940/771)
  Amended the War Risks Insurance Act 1939 (2 & 3 Geo. 6. c. 57).
- Defence (War Risks Insurance) (No. 2) Regulations 1940 (SR&O 1940/1142)
  Amended the War Risks Insurance Act 1939 (2 & 3 Geo. 6. c. 57).
- Defence (War Risks Insurance) (No. 3) Regulations 1940 (SR&O 1940/1288)
  Amended the War Risks Insurance Act 1939 (2 & 3 Geo. 6. c. 57) in relation to liability to death and injury to crews of foreign ships.
- Defence (War Risks Insurance) (No. 4) Regulations 1940 (SR&O 1940/1616)
  Extended the War Risks Insurance Act 1939 (2 & 3 Geo. 6. c. 57) to the Isle of Man.
- Defence (Bodies Corporate and Trade Unions) Regulations 1940 (SR&O 1940/1884)
  Gave organisations the powers to loan their funds interest free to the government, provide ambulances and canteens, or otherwise support the war effort.
- Defence (Building Societies) Regulations 1940 (SR&O 1940/1137)
  Required six months notice for any withdrawal of deposits at a building society.
- Defence (Companies) Regulations 1940 (SR&O 1940/1213)
  Allowed delegation by liquidators called up for war service, and amended the requirement for annual returns.
- Defence (Local Defence Volunteers) Regulations 1940 (SR&O 1940/748), renamed to Defence (Home Guard) Regulations 1940
  Created the Home Guard.
- Defence (Cinematograph Quotas) Regulations 1940 (SR&O 1940/1174)
  Adjusted the quota system for cinema films.
- Defence (Encouragement of Exports) Regulations 1940 (SR&O 1940/1210)
  Encouraging the export of cotton.
- Defence (Evacuated Areas) Regulations 1940 (SR&O 1940/1209)
  Allowed for the suspension of rents, rates, tithes, utility bills, and hire purchase payments in an area that had been evacuated.
- Defence (Petroleum) Regulations 1940 (SR&O 1940/749)
  Created a Petroleum Department within the Board of Trade, with a Secretary for Petroleum.
- Defence (War Zone Courts) Regulations 1940 (SR&O 1940/1444)
  Created special courts to deal with criminal cases in areas of England and Wales that became active war zones.
- Defence (War Zone Courts) (Scotland) Regulations 1940 (SR&O 1940/1445)
  Created special courts to deal with criminal cases in areas of Scotland that became active war zones.
- Defence (Women's Forces) Regulations 1941 (SR&O 1941/581)
  Applied the Air Force Act to the Women's Auxiliary Air Force.
- Defence (Patents, Trade Marks, etc.) Regulations 1941 (SR&O 1941/1780)
- Defence (National Fire Service) Regulations 1941 (SR&O 1941/1133, reissued (SR&O 1941/2054)
- Defence (Functions of Ministers) Regulations 1941 (SR&O 1941/2057)
- Defence (Auxiliary Coastguard) Regulations 1941 (SR&O 1941/2059)
- Defence (War Zone Courts) (Northern Ireland) Regulations 1941 (SR&O 1941/984)
- Defence (Fire Brigades) (Northern Ireland) Regulations 1941 (SR&O 1941/2058)
- Defence (Enemy Currency) Regulations 1941 (SR&O 1941/1401)
- Defence (Burial, Inquests and Registration of Deaths) Regulations 1942 (SR&O 1942/1444)
- Defence (United States Forces–Administration of Estates) Regulations 1942 (SR&O 1942/2562)
- Defence (Recovery of Fines) Regulations 1942 (SR&O 1942/963)
- Defence (Recovery of Fines) (Scotland) Regulations 1942 (SR&O 1942/1143)

Defence (Sale of Food) Regulations 1943
- Statutory Rules and Orders
- Parliament of the United Kingdom
- Citation: SR&O 1943/1553

Dates
- Made: 28 October 1943
Other legislation
| Made under | Emergency Powers (Defence) Act 1939; Emergency Powers (Defence) Act 1940 |

- Defence (Sale of Food) Regulations 1943 (SR&O 1943/1553)
- Defence (Industrial Assurance) Regulations 1943 (SR&O 1943/308)
- Defence (Game) Regulations 1943 (SR&O 1943/1033)
- Defence (Fire Guard) Regulations 1943 (SR&O 1943/916)
- Defence (War Risks Insurance) Regulations 1945 (SR&O 1945/738)
  Extension of war risks insurance beyond 7 May 1945.
- Defence (Services for Industry) Regulations 1945 (SR&O 1945/1614)
  Tasks the Board of Trade with providing services to support industry.
- Defence (Good Friday and St. Patrick's Day) Regulations 1945 (SR&O 1945/164)
  Made Good Friday 30 March 1945 not a public holiday in the UK, and St Patrick's Day 17 March 1945 not a public holiday in Northern Ireland.
- Defence (Price Control) Regulations 1945 (SR&O 1945/1613)
  Gave powers to set maximum prices for goods.

Some regulations included powers for a minister to make further provision by way of orders.

Taken together, the Defence Regulations provided the legal basis for a number of measures aimed at the Home Front including the establishment of the Home Guard, the institution of rationing, and nighttime blackouts.

== Emergency Powers (Defence) Act 1940 ==
Emergency Powers (Defence) Act 1940 (Note: Section 2.)
- Act of Parliament
- Parliament of the United Kingdom
- Long title: An Act to extend the powers which may be exercised by His Majesty under the Emergency Powers (Defence) Act, 1939.
- Citation: 3 & 4 Geo. 6. c. 20
- Territorial extent: United Kingdom

Dates
- Royal assent: 22 May 1940
- Commencement: 22 May 1940 (Note: The Acts of Parliament (Commencement) Act 1793.)
- Repealed: 18 December 1953
Other legislation
| Amends | Emergency Powers (Defence) Act 1939 |
| Amended by | National Service Act 1941 |
| Repealed by | Statute Law Revision Act 1950; Statute Law Revision Act 1953 |

Status: Repealed

Text of statute as originally enacted

The Emergency Powers (Defence) Act 1940 (3 & 4 Geo. 6. c. 20) extended the 1939 act for another year, and provided for annual extensions by parliamentary resolution. It also extended the government's powers under the Defence Regulations to require persons "to place themselves, their services and their property at the disposal of His Majesty" though the practical significance of this extension is unclear given the government had already passed the National Service (Armed Forces) Act 1939 (2 & 3 Geo. 6. c. 81) and the Control of Employment Act 1939 (2 & 3 Geo. 6. c. 104).

== Enforcement ==
Emergency Powers (Defence) (No. 2) Act 1940 (Note: Section 2.)
- Act of Parliament
- Parliament of the United Kingdom
- Long title: An Act to remove doubts as to the extent of the powers which may be exercised by His Majesty under the Emergency Powers (Defence) Act, 1939.
- Citation: 3 & 4 Geo. 6. c. 45
- Territorial extent: United Kingdom

Dates
- Royal assent: 1 August 1940
- Commencement: 1 August 1940
- Repealed: 18 December 1953
Other legislation
| Amends | Emergency Powers (Defence) Act 1939 |
| Repealed by | Statute Law Revision Act 1953 |

Status: Repealed

Text of statute as originally enacted

Originally the regulations did not create any capital offences, since the law of treason was thought to be sufficient. Defence Regulation 2A provided that "If, with intent to assist the enemy, any person does any act which is likely to assist the enemy or to prejudice the public safety, the defence of the realm or the efficient prosecution of the war, he shall be liable to penal servitude for life."

However, in 1940 amendments to the regulations created two capital offences: "forcing safeguards" (breaking through roadblocks etc.) under regulation 1B, and looting under regulation 38A. A third new capital offence, called treachery, was created soon afterwards by the Treachery Act 1940 (3 & 4 Geo. 6. c. 21).

The Emergency Powers (Defence) (No. 2) Act 1940 (3 & 4 Geo. 6. c. 45) enabled the creation of special courts to administer criminal justice in war zones, as well as authorizing them to punish offenders for violating the Defence Regulations.

== Continuance and repeal ==
After the end of the war, the Defence Regulations were continued in force by the Supplies and Services (Transitional Powers) Act 1945 (9 & 10 Geo. 6. c. 10) and later by the Emergency Laws (Transitional Provisions) Act 1946 (9 & 10 Geo. 6. c. 26). They continued to be amended periodically, including by the Defence Regulations (No. 1) Order 1949 (SI 1949/1046), the Defence Regulations (No. 2) Order 1949 (SI 1949/1202), the Defence Regulations (No. 3) Order 1949 (SI 1949/2350) and the Defence Regulations (No. 4) Order 1949 (SI 1949/2388). Some were repealed, for example by the Land Powers (Defence) Act 1958 (6 & 7 Eliz. 2. c. 30).

The Emergency Laws (Repeal) Act 1959 (7 & 8 Eliz. 2. c. 19) repealed most of the Defence (General) Regulations, with the exception of:

- Regulation 55 (giving general power to control industry for wide purposes);
- Regulation 55AA (empowering the government to secure the necessary information for these purposes); and
- Regulation 55AB (giving power to impose price control of goods and services).

The 1959 act also preserved Regulation 2A of the Defence (Finance) Regulations 1939 (power of Treasury to prohibit action on certain orders as to gold, etc.) and the Regulation 6 of the Defence (Armed Forces) Regulations 1939 (power to employ troops on agricultural or other urgent work of national importance). Under the terms of the 1959 act, the last of the Defence Regulations were due to expire on 31 December 1964. However, Regulation 6 of the Defence (Armed Forces) Regulations 1939 was made permanent by the Emergency Powers Act 1964 (c. 38), and several of the other regulations were re-enacted on a permanent basis by the Emergency Laws (Re-enactments and Repeals) Act 1964 (c. 60). As of 2023, Regulation 6 (which authorises the use of service personnel to perform agricultural and other "urgent work of national importance") remains in force.

== See also ==
- Defence of the Realm Act 1914
- Emergency Powers Act 1920
- Capital punishment in the United Kingdom

== Bibliography ==
- Balogh, T. (28 August 1943). "Control over Property". Bulletin of the Oxford University Institute of Economics & Statistics. 5 (12): 196–199. doi:10.1111/j.1468-0084.1943.mp5012003.x. ISSN 0140-5543.
- Cotter, Cornelius P. (1953). "Constitutionalizing Emergency Powers: The British Experience". Stanford Law Review. 5 (3): 382–417. doi:10.2307/1226448. JSTOR 1226448.
- Jennings, W. Ivor (1940). "The Emergency Powers (Defence) (No. 2) Act, 1940". Modern Law Review. 4 (2): 132–136. doi:10.1111/j.1468-2230.1940.tb02739.x. JSTOR 1090251.
- Leeson, David (2012). "Emergency Powers Acts (1920, 1926, 1939–1940, 1964)". In Martel, Gordon (ed.). The Encyclopedia of War. Wiley-Blackwell. ISBN 978-1-40519037-4.
- Simpson, Alfred William Brian (1994). In the Highest Degree Odious: Detention Without Trial in Wartime Britain. Oxford University Press. pp. 43–50. ISBN 978-0-19-825949-7.
