= Clara Lambert =

UK suffragette

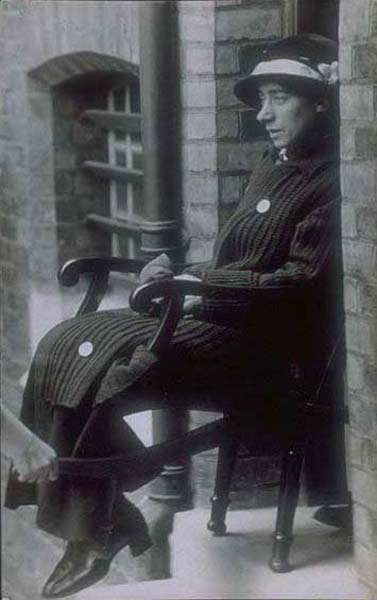
- Photo of Clara Lambert by Special Branch in circa 1913
- Born: 1874
- Died: 1969 (aged 94–95); Farncombe, England, United Kingdom
- Other names: Catherine Wilson; May Stewart or Mary Stewart
- Occupations: Suffragette and police officer
- Known for: Smashed porcelain in the British Museum
- Height: 5 ft (152 cm) 1 (wanted description)
- Partner: Violet Louise Croxford

Clara Mary Lambert aliased as Catherine Wilson; May Stewart or Mary Stewart (1874–1969) was a British frequently-arrested suffragette. She took a hatchet to porcelain in the British Museum, smuggled herself into the House of Commons, committed arson and went on hunger strike during her many arrests. Her Hunger Strike Medal recorded dates over a three-year period.

== Life ==
Lambert was born in 1874. She came from a working-class background and she started work in the family laundry business.

She became a founding member of the Women's Social and Political Union.

Lambert smuggled herself into the British Museum where she appeared to be an interested visitor until she pulled out a brand new hatchet she was hiding beneath her long coat. She broke a display case and then smashed porcelain cups and saucers. Lambert was brought before the Bow Street magistrates the next morning and she was so noisy that they sent her back to the cells. She was protesting particularly about the home secretary who was allowing Emmeline Pankhurst to "face torture" in prison. She returned to the magistrates in the afternoon where she had to be held by two attendants while she was committed for trial. At the trial Lambert was sent to Prison where she went on hunger strike.

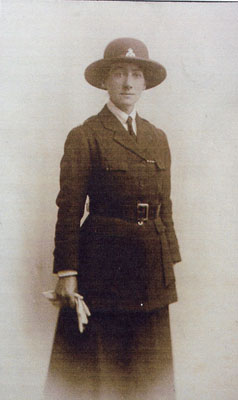
Clara Lambert – police woman

The government had devised a strategy for dealing with hunger striking suffragettes. They had passed legislation allowing the prisoners to be released and then when they were recovered then in theory they were rearrested and returned to complete their sentence. This was known as the Cat and Mouse Act by its critics. Lambert was released and she was obliged to stay at a specific address – which she didn't. The police sent around details of "Catherine Wilson" (Lambert) to its officers including a photograph which had been taken in secret whilst she was in jail and a description of fellow suffragette Mary Richardson. The letter is now in the National Portrait Gallery.

On 16 March 1914 she dressed as a man and entered the Houses of Parliament accompanied by Clement H Whatley at about 8 p.m.. Lambert should have gone to the women's gallery where women could observe parliament from behind a grill. The gallery was poorly lit to prevent men from being distracted by the sight of women. Lambert and Whatley went to the central hall where they were noticed and challenged. Lambert's gender was questioned and she was asked to go to Bow Street Police Station. A whip was found concealed in her overcoat and she was charged under the vagrancy act of being suspicious in a building. The next day she was in Bow Street court facing another six weeks hard labour in jail.

Her Hunger Strike Medal recorded dates over a three-year period of one force-feeding and three periods of imprisonment.

During the war, the Women's Social and Political Union stopped their demonstrations and Lambert joined the organisation started by Nina Boyle and Margaret Damer Dawson and called the Women's Police Service. She was directed by the WPS to work with the women munition workers in Pembrey in Wales, and there she met her life partner Violet Louise Croxford who had been a mental health nurse before the war.

When the war ended she again went to work looking after women. She helped sex-workers in London and in 1926 she and Croxford opened a refuge for them in Hythe in Kent.

Lambert died in Farncombe. Her biography was written by Violet Croxford.
