= Eva Christy =

British equestrian, riding instructor and author

Eva Christy (8 October 1869 – 8 June 1954; also published as E. V. A. Christy) was a British equestrian, riding instructor and author of nonfiction works about horse riding. She taught riding in London from 1894 until the Second World War, including being an official riding instructor for the British Army during the First World War. Her works include two manuals on riding, Side-Saddle Riding: A Practical Handbook for Horsewomen (1899) and Cross-Saddle and Side-Saddle: Modern Riding for Men and Women (1932).

== Early life and education ==
Eva Christy was born in Chignall St James, Chelmsford, Essex, on 8 October 1869 to Mary Ann (née Williams) and Robert Christy, a farmer at Stevens Farm. She was their sixth child, with five older brothers, including the physician and explorer Cuthbert Christy. The family were prominent Quakers. She was educated at home and, from 1883, at the Quaker Mount School, York. Both her parents rode, and her father hunted; Eva learned to ride at a very young age, rode both sidesaddle and astride, and hunted from her childhood.

She did not marry and continued to live at Stevens Farm (with her brother Theodore after her father's death) until 1893. She then went to London, where she first lived with another brother, Gerald, and after 1908 on her own.

== Career and writings ==
After her move to London in 1893, Christy found employment initially escorting ladies on rides. From 1894 she taught sidesaddle riding in Hampstead, finding a niche because male riding instructors had no sidesaddle experience. That year, she was interviewed by Woman's Signal magazine. In addition to teaching riding, she started to train experienced horsewomen to become riding instructors, a process which she considered required at least a year of instruction from an expert. In 1914, she was described as a "well-known riding instructress" in an article in the London Standard.

During the First World War, she instructed soldiers in the British Army in riding, as an official military riding instructor. She was subsequently claimed to be the only woman to act in this role. Between the First and Second World Wars, she ran Christy's Riding School on Finchley Road. She was noted for her work rehabilitating servicemen after the First World War, promoting riding using a sidesaddle for people with prosthetics. Her final book, If Wishes Were Horses Beggars Could Ride (1947), contained material on riding with prosthetic arms or legs.

During her time in London, Christy was associated with the Women's Freedom League, serving as branch chair. She was also associated with the Women's Police Volunteers and later the Women's Police Service. In 1917 she converted to the Church of England over the Quaker pacifist stance.

Christy was one of the foremost writers about horsemanship for women of her time, following Nannie Power O'Donoghue and Alice M. Hayes. Her first book, Side-Saddle Riding: A Practical Handbook for Horsewomen, appeared in 1899; it proved popular and further editions came out in 1901 and 1907. O'Donoghue reviewed the book favourably, describing it as "very useful and sensible". In her later manual, Cross-Saddle and Side-Saddle: Modern Riding for Men and Women (1932), Christy discussed riding astride, recommending it for hunting and jumping; she advised riders (including men) to choose whether to ride sidesaddle or astride according to personal preference. The historian Erica Munkwitz describes the book as one of the two most important works on riding for women to be published between the wars. Christy's later books all appeared under the gender-neutral pseudonym "E. V. A. Christy" to enhance their appeal to male readers. She also published The Rule of the Road (1926), which advised motorists, bicyclists and pedestrians as well as horse riders.

She invented a safety stirrup for women in 1895, which was sold by Champion and Wilton; this attempted to reduce the chance of the woman's foot becoming trapped by the stirrup in the event of a fall, leading to being dragged by the horse. She was also interested in safe and practical riding dress for women, as long skirts posed the danger of getting caught up in the horse's legs or attached to the saddle, again leading to the risk of dragging. In Side-Saddle Riding, Christy publicised a "Busvine Convertible Apron Skirt", based on an apron, which was open at the back to facilitate riding but could be closed with buttons for propriety when not on the horse. She later wrote that the only type of skirt that did not pose a risk of dragging had its "cloth cut away from beneath the entire seat when in the saddle", and offered to forward the details of tailors making such a garment to horsewomen. She was said by her contemporary Edith Watson to have adapted riding dress into the earliest uniform for policewoman.

Christy died on 8 June 1954 in Camberwell, South London.

== Bibliography ==
- Side-Saddle Riding: A Practical Handbook for Horsewomen (Vinton and Co; 1899, 1901, 1907)
- The Rule of the Road (1926)
- Cross-Saddle and Side-Saddle: Modern Riding for Men and Women (Seeley, Service and Co; 1932, 1952)
- If Wishes Were Horses Beggars Could Ride (Nicholson and Watson; 1947)
