= Edith Smith (police officer) =

First woman police officer in UK with full powers of arrest

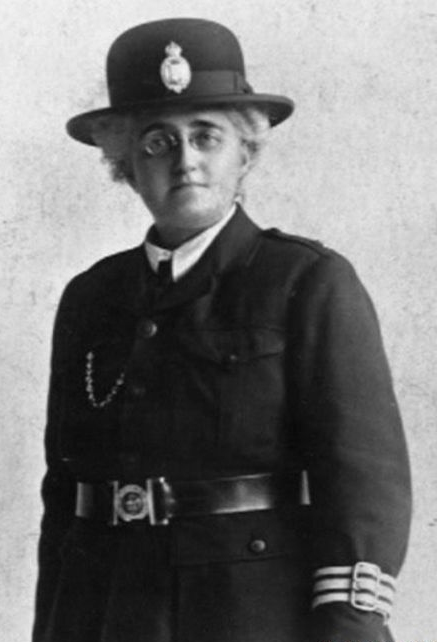
- Edith Smith in police uniform
- Born: 21 November 1876; Oxton, Birkenhead, England
- Died: 26 June 1923 (aged 46); Halton, Runcorn, Cheshire, England
- Occupations: Constable, midwife
- Employer(s): Women's Police Service, Grantham, South Kesteven, Lincolnshire, England, United Kingdom
- Known for: Being the first policewoman in the United Kingdom
- Children: 4

Edith Smith (21 November 1876 – 26 June 1923) was the first female police officer in the United Kingdom (and second in the world after Lillian May Armfield in Australia) with full power of arrest.

== Early life ==
Edith Smith was born on 21 November 1876, in Oxton, Birkenhead. She was one of six children of nursery and seedman James Smith and his wife Harriet. In 1897 she married stationer and tobacconist William Smith. They had three daughters and a son together. She worked for a time as a sub-postmistress. Her husband died in 1907. The 1911 census shows Smith had moved to London and was training to be a midwife. The daughters were at different schools and the son was in an orphanage near Blackburn. Shortly after this she took up a post as a matron at a nursing home.

== Police career ==
Founded in 1914, the Women Police Volunteers (WPV) was staffed by volunteers such as Smith. It was founded by Nina Boyle and Margaret Damer Dawson, who fell out over its anti-prostitution role in London and elsewhere in February 1915, with Boyle leaving the organisation and Dawson reforming it as the Women's Police Service (WPS) with herself as head. Smith remained with the WPS.

In August 1915 Smith was appointed to the Grantham Borough Police and was the first woman police constable in England with full power of arrest. She received 28 shillings (£1 8s.) a week in pay. In April 1917 this was raised to £2 10s. a week. This was more than the oldest male police constable in the force due to the fact that her "duties were most onerous", and taking into account that she was also a qualified nurse.

Smith's policing duties were to deal with cases where women were involved. She was particularly concerned with trying to reduce the number of prostitutes in Grantham who were attracted there by the nearby army base. In 1916, PC Smith cautioned 100 wayward girls in larceny cases and also 16 women and 15 girls who had been found to be drunk. Ten prostitutes were convicted, 10 were handed over to their parents and 50 were cautioned. Smith wrote of her time in Grantham: "The appointment has made such a vast difference – the prostitutes have found that it does not pay and the frivolous girls have bowed down."

Smith travelled around Britain giving talks about women's policing at conferences and writing pamphlets. At the National Union of Women Worker's (NUWW) conference in 1916 she said that "a large portion of police work is of a sordid character but even then it has its interesting side - the study of human nature at its worst."

The legitimacy of policewomen was often questioned during the First World War due to their blurred status and limited powers. Their role was left in the hands of individual chief constables leading to extreme conservatism in some areas and to daring innovations in others. Smith also discussed at the 1916 NUWW conference that some Chief constables were opposed to the appointment of women in the police force, as "it was feared that they might give away police secrets".

== Later life and death ==
Smith left the WPS (renamed the Women's Auxiliary Service after the war) after working seven days a week for a period of two years. She left in 1918 due to chest trouble. Until January 1919, Smith was also the matron nurse at Lindis Nursing Home, Dudley Road in Grantham where she worked seven days a week.

Smith moved to Runcorn in Cheshire to work for a Nursing Association. Finding it to be low on funds, she gave lectures, organised whist drives and conducted shorthand classes to raise money. However, there were some local concerns, from individuals who "did not complain about the nurse's work, but about her methods".

She died on 26 June 1923 after she took an overdose of morphia, five years after leaving the force. The coroner returned a verdict that she took her own life while temporarily insane. Her life is commemorated in Grantham Museum. Her grave at Halton Cemetery in Runcorn was unmarked until two policewomen launched a fundraising campaign to buy a headstone in 2018. She shares the grave with her niece, Marjorie, who died aged two years on the tenth day after Smith's death.

== Commemoration ==
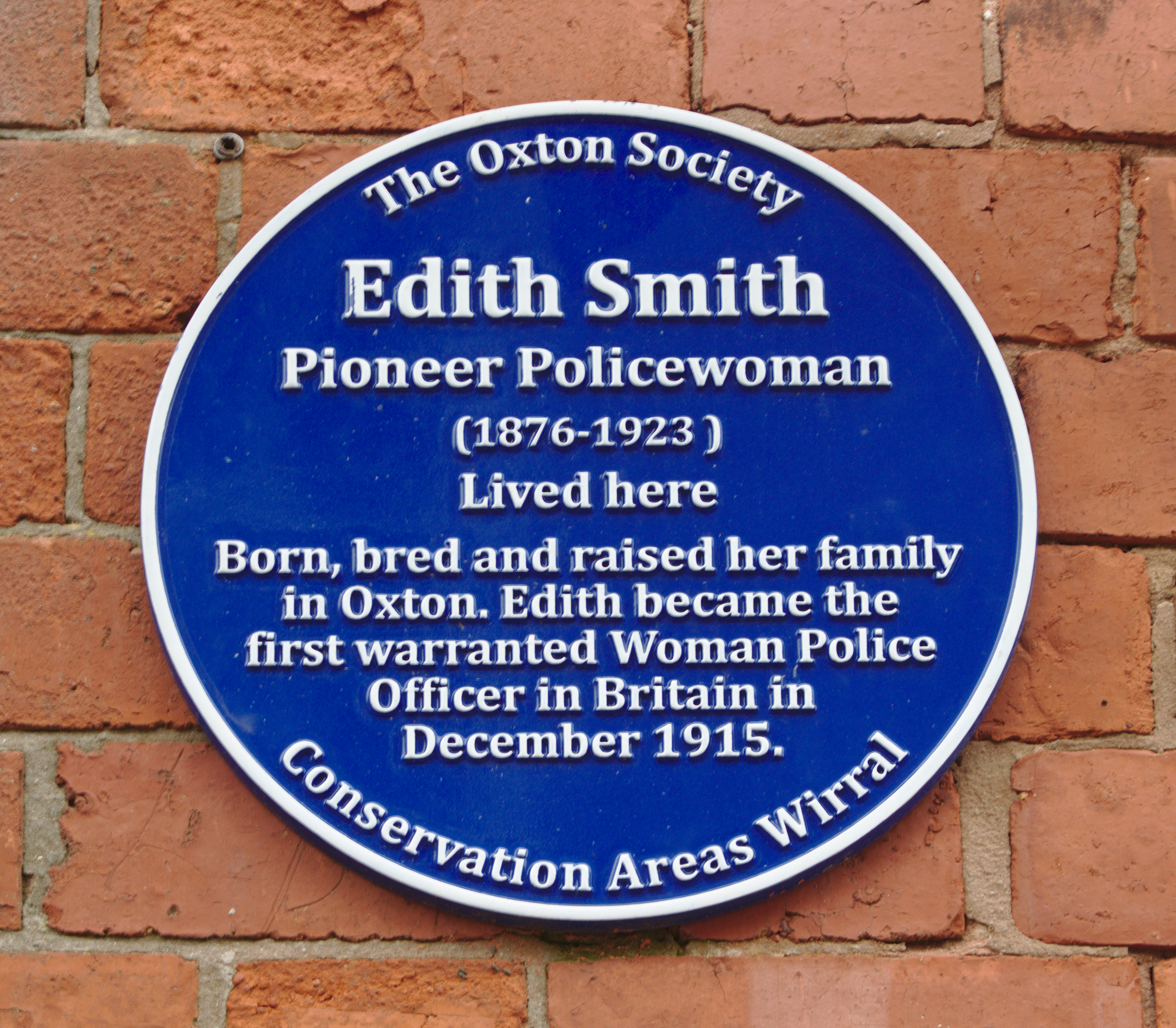
Blue plaque installed in 2018 on Smith's home in Oxton

In 2014, a blue plaque was unveiled on the wall of the old prison building between the Grantham Guildhall and the Grantham Museum where she had worked as a policewoman. Deputy Chief Constable Heather Roach, of Lincolnshire Police, said: "She spent time getting to know the people in her area and thoroughly understood the concept of 'neighbourhood policing'."

On 16 June 2018 a blue plaque was erected on 18 Palm Hill, Oxton, where she had lived. The plaque was unveiled by her granddaughter Margaret Smith.

On 8 March 2019 a blue plaque was erected on St Mary's Church Hall, Halton, Runcorn, on the site of the old almshouses where Edith had been living at the time of her death.

In September 2021, the Grantham Museum opened an exhibit looking at Smith's role in the police force.

In March 2023, she was one of a number of notable women with a connection to Grantham honoured by South Kesteven District Council.
