= Doug Jennings =

Doug Jennings may refer to:

- Doug Jennings (baseball)
- Doug Jennings (politician)

== See also ==
- Douglas Jennings, English sculptor
