= Statue of Albert, Prince Consort =

Statue of Albert, Prince Consort may refer to:

- Statue of Albert, Prince Consort, North Inch
- Statue of Albert, Prince Consort, Balmoral Castle
