= Stanisława Paleolog =

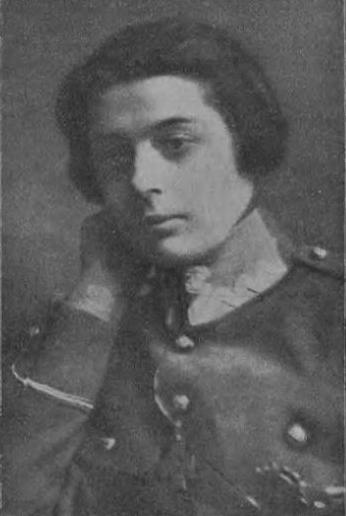
Stanisława Paleolog

Stanisława Filipina Paleolog (4 May 1892, in Rumno, Galicia – 3 December 1968, in United Kingdom) was a Polish official, military and political activist. She participated in warfare within the Polish army, served as commissionaire within the Polish State Police, an officer within the Blue Police, Captain within the Union of Armed Struggle and cabinet minister in the first government of Antoni Pająk.

Paleolog studied at the Academy of Trade in Lwów. In 1914 she joined the Polish Military Organisation. Seriously wounded in the defence of Lwów, in December 1918 she joined the Women’s Civic Militia, and later helped establish the Voluntary Women’s Legion. In 1925, she was appointed Commandant of the Women’s Section of the Polish Police Force, serving in this capacity until 1939.

During her tenure, Paleolog became an expert on combating such crimes as human trafficking, sexual exploitation and juvenile delinquency. Among her duties were fighting crime against women and children. In particular, she worked on combating the trafficking of women who were sent to escort agencies, including in South America. Her enthusiasm, energy and engagement in the construction of a professional and effective female police division made this force known in the world.

Foreign press was enthusiastic in its praise for the Polish women’s police, which was frequently presented as a model worth following. In 1929, the Daily Express called Paleolog the “Polish Joan of Arc”, emphasising her contribution to the fight against human trafficking and sexual exploitation of women.

In May 1935, Mary Sophia Allen and a delegation of English women from her Women's Auxiliary Service came to Poland to familiarise themselves with the work of policewomen officers. The comprehensive preparation of the Polish Women Police Division made a huge impression on them, including the fact that Polish policewomen performed all police tasks, including wearing weapons, cooperating with informers, and interrogating pimps and victims of human trafficking.

Paleolog’s police career was interrupted by the outbreak of the Second World War. In September 1939, together with the National Police Headquarters and officers from the police school company, she was evacuated to Wołyń, where she joined the Independent Operational Group “Polesie”. She became a liaison officer and her students – paramedics. After the capitulation of the Polish army she returned to Warsaw and became an active member of the clandestine Union of Armed Struggle aka the Home Army.

She served in counter-intelligence, and also helped organise the State Security Corps. In 1945, threatened with arrest in communist Poland, she decided to leave the country. She joined the Second Polish Corps and came to Great Britain, settling in London, where she worked as a police expert at New Scotland Yard. She was appointed a minister in the government-in-exile of Antoni Pająk in 1955.

In 1957 she wrote a book about the interwar Polish policewomen entitled “The Women Police of Poland 1925-1939”, which is the most comprehensive study on this subject. Following a long-lasting illness, she died on 3 December 1968 in Penley, Wales and was buried in Southern Cemetery, Manchester. In November 2019, Paleolog was honoured with a plaque at the place of her burial in Manchester to mark 100 years of the Polish Police. The plaque was an initiative of the Polish Police, Consulate General of the Republic of Poland in Manchester and the Polish Church of Divine Mercy.
