= List of listed buildings in Crathie and Braemar =

This is a list of listed buildings in the parish of Crathie and Braemar in Aberdeenshire, Scotland.

== List ==
Name	Location	Date listed	Geo-coordinates	Notes	Category	LB number	Image
Royal Lochnagar Distillery, Former Steading Offices, Manager's House And Ancillary Structures			57°01′48″N 3°12′32″W		B	6230	Upload another image
Drochaid An T-Seann Spideil (Old Spittal Bridge)			56°54′32″N 3°24′17″W		C(S)	2992	Upload Photo
Invercauld House, Including Butler's Flat, Secretary's Flat And Ancillary Structures			57°00′56″N 3°21′43″W		A	2995	Upload another image
Mar Lodge Estate, Lodge At Victoria Bridge			56°59′17″N 3°28′44″W		B	2999	Upload Photo
Abergeldie Castle, Including Cottages, Game Larder And Boundary Walls			57°02′35″N 3°10′36″W		A	3005	Upload Photo
Mar Lodge Estate, Linn Of Quoich, Queen Victoria's Picnic Cottage At The Punch Bowl			57°00′16″N 3°27′31″W		C(S)	1416	Upload Photo
Auchtavan, Queen Mother's Cottage			57°02′37″N 3°18′49″W		B	50075	Upload Photo
Balnacroft, The Kennels, Including Ancillary Structures And Gatepiers			57°02′08″N 3°10′56″W		C(S)	50754	Upload Photo
Crathie, Clagganghoul			57°00′28″N 3°17′59″W		C(S)	50755	Upload Photo
Mar Lodge Estate, Linn Of Dee Bridge			56°59′18″N 3°32′45″W		B	50767	Upload Photo
Balmoral Castle, Bridge Lodge (Police Barracks)			57°02′21″N 3°13′08″W		B	51463	Upload Photo
Balmoral Castle, Gardener's Cottage, Tigh-Na-Garaidh			57°02′22″N 3°13′38″W		C(S)	51476	Upload Photo
Balmoral Castle, Gate Lodge			57°02′20″N 3°13′10″W		B	51477	Upload Photo
Balmoral Castle, 1 And 2 Riverside Cottages			57°02′31″N 3°13′34″W		C(S)	51487	Upload Photo
Balmoral Castle, The Surgery, Former Telephone Exchange			57°02′30″N 3°13′37″W		B	51496	Upload Photo
Balmoral Castle, Venison Larder			57°02′26″N 3°13′39″W		A	51497	Upload Photo
Balmoral Castle, War Memorial			57°02′21″N 3°13′07″W		C(S)	51498	Upload another image
Easter Balmoral, Craig Gowan, Memorial Drinking Basin			57°01′51″N 3°13′02″W		C(S)	51505	Upload Photo
Garbh Allt Falls Bridge			56°59′24″N 3°19′10″W		A	51513	Upload Photo
Garbh Allt Suspension Bridge			57°00′06″N 3°19′22″W		B	51516	Upload Photo
Braemar Village, 33 Chapel Brae, Viewfield And Timber "Wee House"			57°00′15″N 3°24′36″W		C(S)	6411	Upload Photo
Braemar Village, Fife Brae, Daisybank And Adjoining Timber 'Wee House'			57°00′24″N 3°24′04″W		B	6297	Upload Photo
Braemar Village Auchendryne Square, Auchendryne Lodge			57°00′25″N 3°24′15″W		C(S)	6255	Upload Photo
Braemar Village, Glenshee Road, Braemar Lodge Hotel			57°00′16″N 3°23′48″W		C(S)	6275	Upload Photo
Braemar Village, Glenshee Road, Victoria Hall			57°00′18″N 3°23′52″W		B	6276	Upload Photo
Mar Estate, Inverey, Bridge Over Ey Burn			56°59′04″N 3°30′19″W		C(S)	37	Upload Photo
Mar Lodge Estate, Mar Lodge Including Garden Wall			56°59′32″N 3°29′19″W		B	48775	Upload Photo
Invercauld Policies, Summerhouse To North Of Invercauld House			57°01′00″N 3°21′21″W		C(S)	50764	Upload Photo
Mar Lodge Estate, St Ninian's Chapel (Scottish Episcopal Church)			56°59′32″N 3°29′19″W		B	50768	Upload Photo
Balmoral Castle, Drinking Fountain By Cricket Ground			57°02′14″N 3°14′17″W		C(S)	51470	Upload Photo
Balmoral Castle. Obelisk To Queen Victoria			57°02′19″N 3°13′11″W		C(S)	51483	Upload Photo
Balmoral Castle, West Lodge With Gatepiers And Quadrant Walls			57°01′52″N 3°14′51″W		B	51499	Upload Photo
Balmoral Castle, Workshops/Stores			57°02′28″N 3°13′34″W		C(S)	51500	Upload Photo
Easter Balmoral, 1 Ivy Cottage			57°01′58″N 3°12′52″W		C(S)	51507	Upload Photo
Braemar Village, Mar Road, Juniper Cottage And 'Wee House'			57°00′22″N 3°24′07″W		C(S)	6288	Upload Photo
Braemar Village, Auchendryne Square, Tyenabruich And Tyenabruich Cottage			57°00′23″N 3°24′11″W		C(S)	6259	Upload Photo
Braemar Village, Clunie Bank Road, Clunie Bank			57°00′18″N 3°24′00″W		C(S)	6274	Upload Photo
Braemar Village, Invercauld Road, Octagon Observatory			57°00′23″N 3°23′51″W		C(S)	6278	Upload Photo
Mar Lodge Estate, Derry Lodge			57°01′18″N 3°34′51″W		C(S)	3003	Upload Photo
Auchtavan, Cottage			57°02′41″N 3°18′37″W		A	50074	Upload another image See more images
Crathie, The Manse, Including Boundary Wall			57°02′14″N 3°12′47″W		C(S)	50758	Upload Photo
Girnoc, Mill Of Cosh Including Lade And Pair Of Cottages To West			57°02′37″N 3°07′13″W		B	50759	Upload Photo
Balmoral Castle, 4 Dairy Cottages And Offices			57°02′08″N 3°13′13″W		C(S)	51469	Upload Photo
Balmoral Castle, Duke Of Saxe-Coburg Gotha Memorial Cross			57°02′09″N 3°13′00″W		C(S)	51471	Upload Photo
Balmoral Castle, Pony Stables			57°02′30″N 3°13′37″W		C(S)	51484	Upload Photo
Invergelder Old Farmhouse			57°01′45″N 3°15′10″W		B	51519	Upload Photo
Braemar Village, Linn Of Dee Road, Balvenie			57°00′23″N 3°24′24″W		C(S)	6285	Upload Photo
Braemar Village, 2-12 (Even Nos) Mar Road, Fife Arms Hotel			57°00′22″N 3°24′01″W		B	6292	Upload Photo
Braemar Village Auchendryne Square, St Andrews Roman Catholic Church, Presbytery, Boundary Wall Entrance Gates And Lamp Standard			57°00′28″N 3°24′14″W		B	6251	Upload Photo
Braemar Village, Invercauld Road, Castleton Place, Former Great North Of Scotland Omnibus Station Depot			57°00′24″N 3°23′49″W		B	6279	Upload Photo
Braemar Village, 8 And 10 Invercauld Road, The Highlander And Lamont Sporrans			57°00′21″N 3°23′55″W		C(S)	6282	Upload Photo
Braemar Village, Invercauld Road, Invercauld Arms Hotel			57°00′27″N 3°23′51″W		C(S)	6283	Upload Photo
Abergeldie Bridge Over River Dee			57°02′38″N 3°10′34″W		B	2987	Upload Photo
Invercauld Policies, Balnagower Cottage			57°01′14″N 3°23′27″W		B	50512	Upload Photo
Abergeldie Estate, Commemorative Drinking Well			57°03′00″N 3°08′09″W		C(S)	50753	Upload Photo
Mar Estate, Inverey, Former Smithy			56°59′09″N 3°29′58″W		C(S)	50766	Upload Photo
Balmoral Castle, Iron Ballroom, Joiner's Workshop			57°02′27″N 3°13′37″W		A	51479	Upload Photo
Balmoral Castle, Princess Alice's Monument			57°02′18″N 3°14′16″W		C(S)	51485	Upload Photo
Balmoral Castle, Statue Of Florentine Boar			57°02′23″N 3°13′51″W		B	51492	Upload another image
Easter Balmoral, 1 And 2 Jubilee Cottages			57°01′58″N 3°12′51″W		C(S)	51508	Upload Photo
Easter Balmoral, Pavilion (Curling Club)			57°02′01″N 3°12′47″W		C(S)	51509	Upload Photo
Easter Balmoral, Post Office Shop And Tigh-Na-Barr			57°01′57″N 3°12′49″W		B	51510	Upload Photo
Braemar Village, Linn Of Dee Road, Rose Cottage And Timber' Wee House'			57°00′24″N 3°24′18″W		C(S)	6287	Upload Photo
Braemar Village Auchendryne Square, Hayfield			57°00′24″N 3°24′16″W		C(S)	6256	Upload Photo
Braemar Village, Auchendryne Square, Jubilee Fountain			57°00′23″N 3°24′13″W		C(S)	6258	Upload Photo
Braemar Village, 3 Glenshee Road, Robert Louis Stevenson Cottage			57°00′19″N 3°23′50″W		C(S)	6267	Upload Photo
Braemar Village, 7, 9 Invercauld Road, Bank Of Scotland, Auld Bank House And Boundary Railings			57°00′24″N 3°23′54″W		C(S)	6280	Upload Photo
Braemar Village, Mar Road, 2 K6 Telephone Boxes Adjacent To Braemar Mews			57°00′21″N 3°24′03″W		B	3434	Upload Photo
Mar Estate, Corriemulzie Dairy And Cottage			56°59′12″N 3°28′05″W		B	2994	Upload Photo
Mar Lodge Victoria Bridge			56°59′19″N 3°28′45″W		B	3002	Upload Photo
Balmoral Castle With Parterre And Terrace Walls			57°02′26″N 3°13′49″W		A	51460	Upload another image
Balmoral Castle, Karim Cottage			57°02′25″N 3°13′32″W		C(S)	51480	Upload Photo
Balmoral Castle, Statue Of Queen Victoria			57°02′19″N 3°13′10″W		A	51495	Upload Photo
Connachat, Prince Of Battenburg Memorial			57°00′39″N 3°17′26″W		C(S)	51502	Upload another image
Easter Balmoral, Craig Gowan Including Outbuilding			57°01′52″N 3°13′03″W		C(S)	51504	Upload Photo
Glen Gelder, Gelder Shiel With Outbuilding			56°59′42″N 3°13′28″W		C(S)	51518	Upload Photo
Braemar Village, Broombank Terrace, Downfield Cottage			57°00′21″N 3°24′14″W		C(S)	6261	Upload Photo
Braemar Village, Clunie Bank Road, The Granary (Former Mill Of Auchendryne)			57°00′17″N 3°23′59″W		C(S)	6273	Upload Photo
Braemar Village, Hillside Drive, Hillside And Timber 'Wee House'			57°00′20″N 3°23′40″W		C(S)	6277	Upload Photo
Crathie Suspension Bridge Over River Dee			57°02′01″N 3°12′40″W		A	2988	Upload Photo
Crathie, K6 Telephone Kiosk At Crathie Parish Church			57°02′24″N 3°12′52″W		B	2991	Upload another image
Mar Estate, Inverey, Knock Cottage			56°59′01″N 3°30′08″W		C(S)	2993	Upload Photo
Invercauld Policies, No 4 Keiloch			57°00′28″N 3°20′24″W		C(S)	2997	Upload Photo
Crathie Parish Church (Church Of Scotland), Including Boundary Walls			57°02′23″N 3°12′44″W		B	3007	Upload another image See more images
Crathie, Milton Of Ballachlaggan			57°01′51″N 3°16′55″W		B	50756	Upload Photo
Crathie, Bridge At Bush Lawsie Over Crathie Burn			57°03′11″N 3°13′50″W		C(S)	50757	Upload Photo
Girnoc, The Old Post Office			57°02′53″N 3°06′54″W		C(S)	50760	Upload Photo
Invercauld Policies, Clunie Cottage			57°00′21″N 3°20′53″W		C(S)	50761	Upload Photo
Balmoral Castle, Chamois Deer Statue And Fountain On Western Parterre			57°02′25″N 3°13′51″W		B	51464	Upload Photo
Balmoral Castle, Dairy And 1 And 2 Dairy Cottages			57°02′09″N 3°13′12″W		A	51468	Upload Photo
Balmoral Castle, Garden Cottage			57°02′20″N 3°13′47″W		B	51475	Upload Photo
Balmoral Castle, Ice House			57°02′26″N 3°13′41″W		C(S)	51478	Upload Photo
Balmoral Castle, Obelisk To Prince Albert			57°02′13″N 3°13′04″W		C(S)	51482	Upload Photo
Balmoral Castle, Stables (Carriage Exhibition), Coach House And Estates Office			57°02′30″N 3°13′36″W		A	51491	Upload Photo
Balmoral Castle, Statue Of John Brown			57°02′03″N 3°13′16″W		A	51493	Upload Photo
Easter Balmoral, Craiglourigan Cottage			57°01′52″N 3°12′55″W		C(S)	51506	Upload Photo
Easter Balmoral, Rhebreck, Water Tank			57°01′47″N 3°13′08″W		C(S)	51512	Upload Photo
Garbh Allt Shiel, Including Outbuilding			56°59′52″N 3°19′07″W		B	51515	Upload Photo
Garmaddie Cottage			57°01′40″N 3°15′24″W		C(S)	51517	Upload Photo
Invergelder Steading With Tool Shed, Fuel Store, Sawmill And Banked Walls			57°01′44″N 3°15′07″W		B	51520	Upload Photo
Braemar Village, Auchendryne Square, Inver Cottage			57°00′25″N 3°24′14″W		C(S)	6253	Upload Photo
Braemar Village 7 Castleton Terrace			57°00′22″N 3°23′51″W		C(S)	6264	Upload Photo
Braemar Village 8 Castleton Terrace, Gowan Lee			57°00′20″N 3°23′51″W		C(S)	6265	Upload Photo
Braemar Village, 35 Chapel Brae, Lui Cottage And Timber Wee House			57°00′15″N 3°24′40″W		C(S)	6268	Upload Photo
Braemar Village, Invercauld Road, 1-7 (Inclusive Nos) Clunie Bank Gardens (Former Church Of Scotland Parish Church)			57°00′26″N 3°23′54″W		C(S)	6281	Upload Photo
Crathie Girder Bridge Over River Dee			57°02′22″N 3°13′03″W		A	2989	Upload another image
Invercauld Bridge Over River Dee			57°00′13″N 3°20′33″W		B	3001	Upload Photo
Braemar Castle, Including Ancillary Structures			57°00′53″N 3°23′29″W		A	36	Upload another image
Invercauld Policies, Inverchandlick			57°00′59″N 3°24′08″W		C(S)	50762	Upload Photo
Invercauld Policies, The Kennels			57°01′15″N 3°21′48″W		C(S)	50763	Upload Photo
Abergeldie Estate, East Lodge Including Gate Piers And Boundary Wall			57°02′36″N 3°10′17″W		B	50770	Upload Photo
Balmoral Castle, Baile-Na-Coille, Including Steading And Game Larder			57°02′04″N 3°13′08″W		B	51461	Upload Photo
Balmoral Castle, Bench			57°02′04″N 3°13′14″W		C(S)	51462	Upload Photo
Balmoral Castle, The Croft, Eagle House			57°01′44″N 3°14′47″W		B	51466	Upload Photo
Balmoral Castle, East Lodge (Head Gardener's Cottage)			57°02′14″N 3°13′15″W		B	51472	Upload Photo
Balmoral Castle, Entrance Gates, Gatepiers, Quadrant Walls And Lamp Standards			57°02′21″N 3°13′10″W		C(S)	51473	Upload Photo
Balmoral Castle, King Edward Vii Memorial And Drinking Fountain			57°02′16″N 3°13′21″W		C(S)	51481	Upload Photo
Balmoral Castle, Roe Deer Statue By Eastern Parterre			57°02′25″N 3°13′47″W		B	51488	Upload Photo
Balmoral Castle, Shell Drinking Fountain In Sunken Garden By Western Parterre			57°02′25″N 3°13′53″W		C(S)	51489	Upload Photo
Easter Balmoral, Rhebreck, Including Timber Shed			57°01′47″N 3°13′12″W		B	51511	Upload Photo
Braemar Village, 6 Castleton Terrace			57°00′22″N 3°23′51″W		C(S)	6263	Upload Photo
Braemar Village, Castleton Terrace, St Margaret's Church (Scottish Episcopal), Gate Arch And Lamp			57°00′21″N 3°23′50″W		A	6266	Upload another image See more images
Braemar Village, Clunie Bank Road, Braemar Parish Church (Church Of Scotland)			57°00′18″N 3°24′04″W		B	6270	Upload Photo
Invercauld Policies, Alltdourie Cottage And Ancillary Structure			57°01′13″N 3°22′26″W		B	2996	Upload Photo
Glen Clunie, Fraser's Bridge Over Clunie Water			56°57′42″N 3°24′11″W		B	2998	Upload another image
Auchtavan, Threshing Mill And Granary			57°02′37″N 3°18′51″W		B	50076	Upload Photo
Lochnagar, Old Schoolhouse Including Boundary Wall			57°01′50″N 3°12′09″W		C(S)	50765	Upload Photo
Mar Lodge Estate, The Ballroom			56°59′30″N 3°29′24″W		B	50769	Upload Photo
Balmoral Castle, The Croft			57°01′48″N 3°14′50″W		B	51465	Upload Photo
Balmoral Castle, The Croft, Kennels			57°01′46″N 3°14′48″W		C(S)	51467	Upload Photo
Balmoral Castle, Game Larders			57°02′27″N 3°13′39″W		B	51474	Upload Photo
Balmoral Castle, Putto Fountain On Eastern Panterre			57°02′26″N 3°13′48″W		B	51486	Upload Photo
Balmoral Castle, South Garden And Queen Mary's Garden Including Greenhouses, Tool Sheds And Fountain			57°02′21″N 3°13′40″W		B	51490	Upload Photo
Balmoral Castle, Statue Of Prince Albert			57°02′14″N 3°13′06″W		A	51494	Upload Photo
Bridge Of Dee Lodge (Threepenny-Bit Cottage)			57°00′12″N 3°20′27″W		B	51501	Upload Photo
Easter Balmoral, Burnside			57°01′58″N 3°12′50″W		C(S)	51503	Upload Photo
The Princess Royal and Duke of Fife Memorial Park, Patron's Pavilion, Private Enclosure and Gatepiers Only, Broombank Terrace, Braemar			57°00′16″N 3°24′25″W		C(S)	52167	Upload Photo
Tomintoul Croft			56°59′49″N 3°24′36″W		A	51797	Upload Photo

== Key ==
The scheme for classifying buildings in Scotland is:

- Category A: "buildings of national or international importance, either architectural or historic; or fine, little-altered examples of some particular period, style or building type."
- Category B: "buildings of regional or more than local importance; or major examples of some particular period, style or building type, which may have been altered."
- Category C: "buildings of local importance; lesser examples of any period, style, or building type, as originally constructed or moderately altered; and simple traditional buildings which group well with other listed buildings."

In March 2016 there were 47,288 listed buildings in Scotland. Of these, 8% were Category A, and 50% were Category B, with the remaining 42% being Category C.

== See also ==
- List of listed buildings in Aberdeenshire
