= Grantham Guildhall =

Municipal building in Grantham, Lincolnshire, England

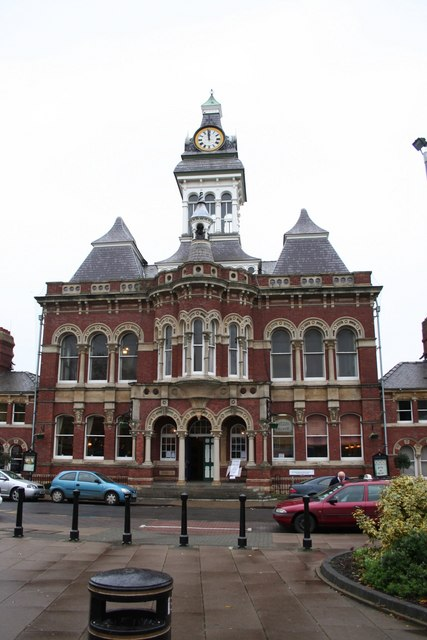
- Grantham Guildhall

- Shown in Lincolnshire
- 52.9107°N 0.6401°W
- Location: St Peter's Hill, Grantham

History
- Built: 1869

Site notes
- Architect: William Watkins
- Architectural style: Renaissance Revival style

Listed Building – Grade II
- Designated: 20 April 1972
- Reference no.: 1360282

Grantham Guildhall is a municipal building on St Peter's Hill, Grantham, Lincolnshire, England. It is a Grade II listed building.

== History ==
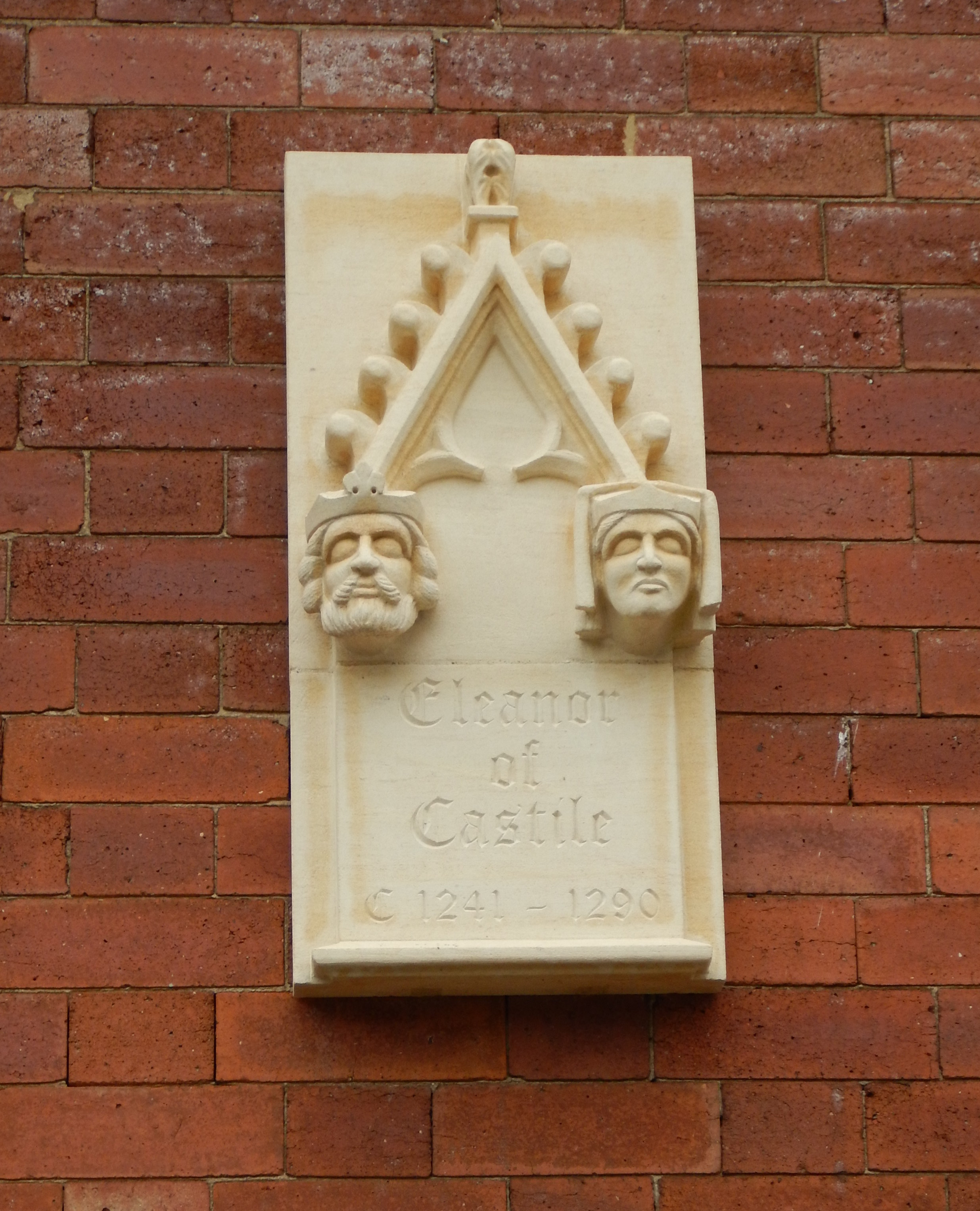
Stone plaque commemorating Eleanor of Castile

The building was commissioned to replace the aging guildhall and jail on the corner of Guildhall Street and High Street. The site selected for the new building had previously been occupied by a large mansion that had been converted into a school known as "The Firs". A statue of Sir Isaac Newton by the sculptor, William Theed, was erected in front of the school in 1858 and therefore pre-dates the guildhall.

The new building, which was designed by William Watkins in the Renaissance Revival style and built by William Wartnaby of Little Gonerby, was completed in 1869. The design involved a symmetrical main frontage with nine bays facing onto St Peter's Hill; the central section of three bays, which slightly projected forward, featured three arched openings separated by Corinthian order columns on the ground floor, a prominent oriel window on the first floor and a large lantern with a clock above. The hour-striking clock was by J. Smith & Sons of Derby; a bell was mounted in a separate turret. The main building accommodated a ballroom and a sessions hall; a prison building was erected at the same time as was a separate governor's residence. After the prison building was no longer required, it was leased to Robinson and Barnsdale, cigar makers, in 1882 and then leased to Grantham Technical Institute in 1897.

During the Second World War parts of Grantham were badly damaged by bombing and the guildhall was protected by sandbags and blastwalls.

The guildhall was the meeting place of Grantham Borough Council until 1974 when the enlarged South Kesteven District Council was formed and the guildhall ceased to be the local seat of government; after a period of disuse it was converted into an arts centre, to a design by Tim Benton, in 1991. The mayor's parlour in the guildhall remains the meeting place for the charter trustees who continue to appoint the mayor of Grantham each year.

A blue plaque was unveiled on the wall of the old prison building in 2014 to commemorate the life of Edith Smith, the first woman police officer in the United Kingdom with full power of arrest.

In 2015, a modern relief stone plaque commemorating Eleanor of Castile was installed at the guildhall close to the site where an original Eleanor cross was erected by King Edward I in around 1294. The original Eleanor Cross had been destroyed in 1645 during the English Civil War. The arts centre continues to provide support for pantomimes such as "Peter Pan" in December 2017, "Dick Whittington" in December 2018, "Cinderella" in December 2019 and "Jack and The Beanstalk" in December 2021.
