= Douglas Jennings =

English sculptor

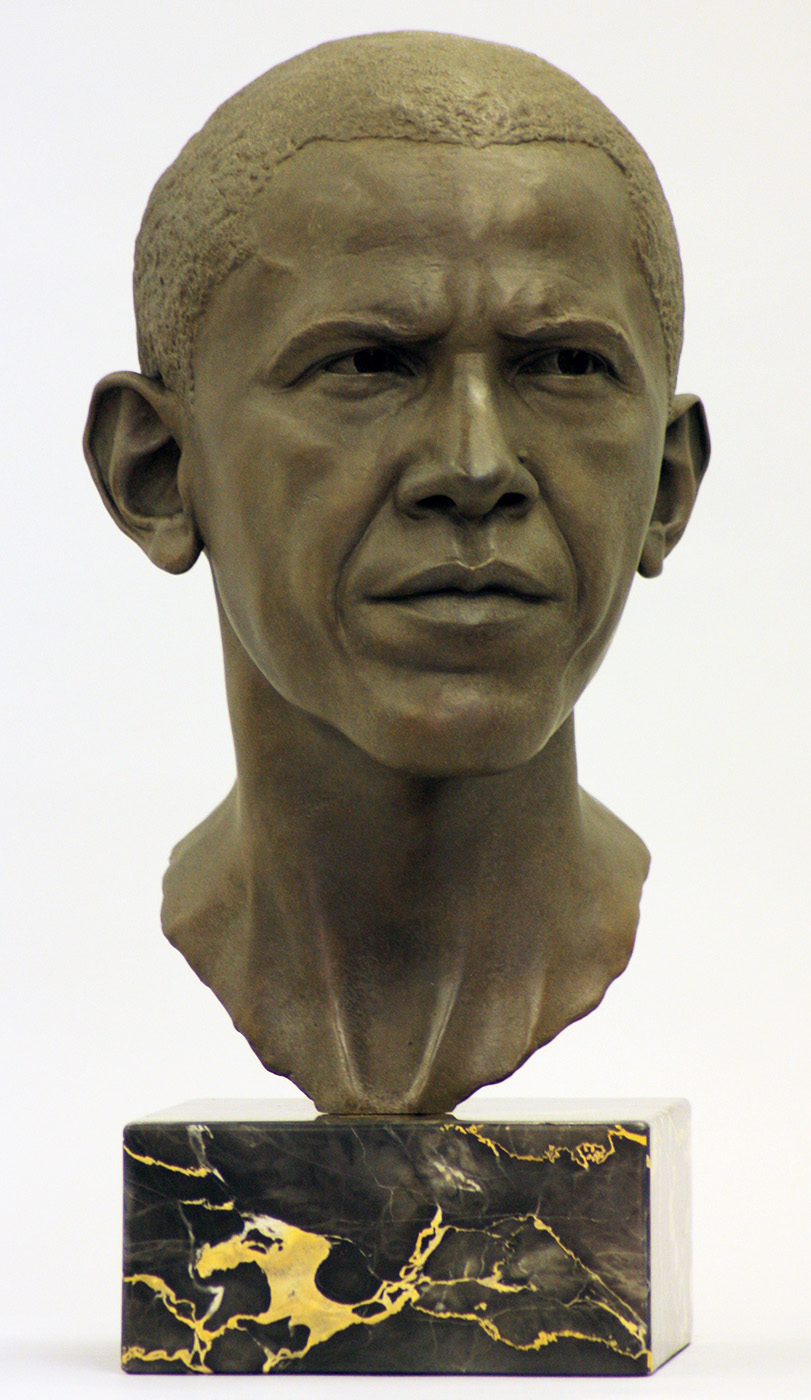
Bronze commemorative bust of Barack Obama

Douglas Jennings MRSS (born 24 September 1966) is an English sculptor and a Member of the Royal Society of Sculptors.

== Career ==
Jennings studied Classical figurative sculpture at Stafford Art College and was inspired by the works of Bernini and Michelangelo.

Between 1999 and 2003 he specialized in portrait sculpture for Madame Tussauds and was responsible for waxwork models of Ken Livingstone, Charles Kennedy, Robin Williams and Nicolas Cage in 2008.

Jennings trained as a classical sculptor and is a life member of the Royal British Society of Sculptors. He specialises in producing monumental art works for public figures in the world of sport, entertainment and politics. His artwork is in private and public collections worldwide. He is known for producing public sculpture that captivates with its level of detail, naturalistic style and the beauty of his work.

Jennings completed a bronze memorial of Johnny Haynes in 2008. Installed at Fulham FC, Haynes is widely regarded as the greatest footballer ever to play for the London club. He also made 56 appearances for England, including 22 as captain. In 2017 Douglas completed another commission for Fulham FC – a commemorative bronze statue of George Cohen MBE. The piece was unveiled at Fulham FC to celebrate Cohen's remarkable career and the 50th anniversary of England's famous World Cup victory in 1966.

In 2015 the quality of Douglas's work was commended by the Public Monuments and Sculpture Association. He was presented with the Marsh Award for Excellence in Public Sculpture for his WWII memorial statue of Squadron Leader Mahinder Singh Pujji. This was commissioned by Gravesham Borough Council and is located in public parkland by the River Thames.

In 2016 Jennings was commissioned to create a bronze memorial statue of Margaret Thatcher dressed in full ceremonial robes of the House of Lords. The piece was planned to be erected in Parliament Square, but controversially, Westminster council turned down the plan because of what officials describe as "monument saturation". On 15 May 2022, the new statue was installed on St Peter's Hill Green in Thatcher's home town of Grantham, close to Grantham Museum, but was attacked with eggs within two hours of its unveiling.

Jennings created a statue of the Queen to mark Her Majesty's 90th birthday celebrations, in 2018. The artwork was commissioned by Gravesham Council and is believed to be the only statue showing the Queen seated. The bronze statue, mounted on a stone plinth, features the monarch dressed in her Order of the Garter robes.
