= Statue of Margaret Thatcher, Grantham =

2022 sculpture of Margaret Thatcher

Statue of Margaret Thatcher
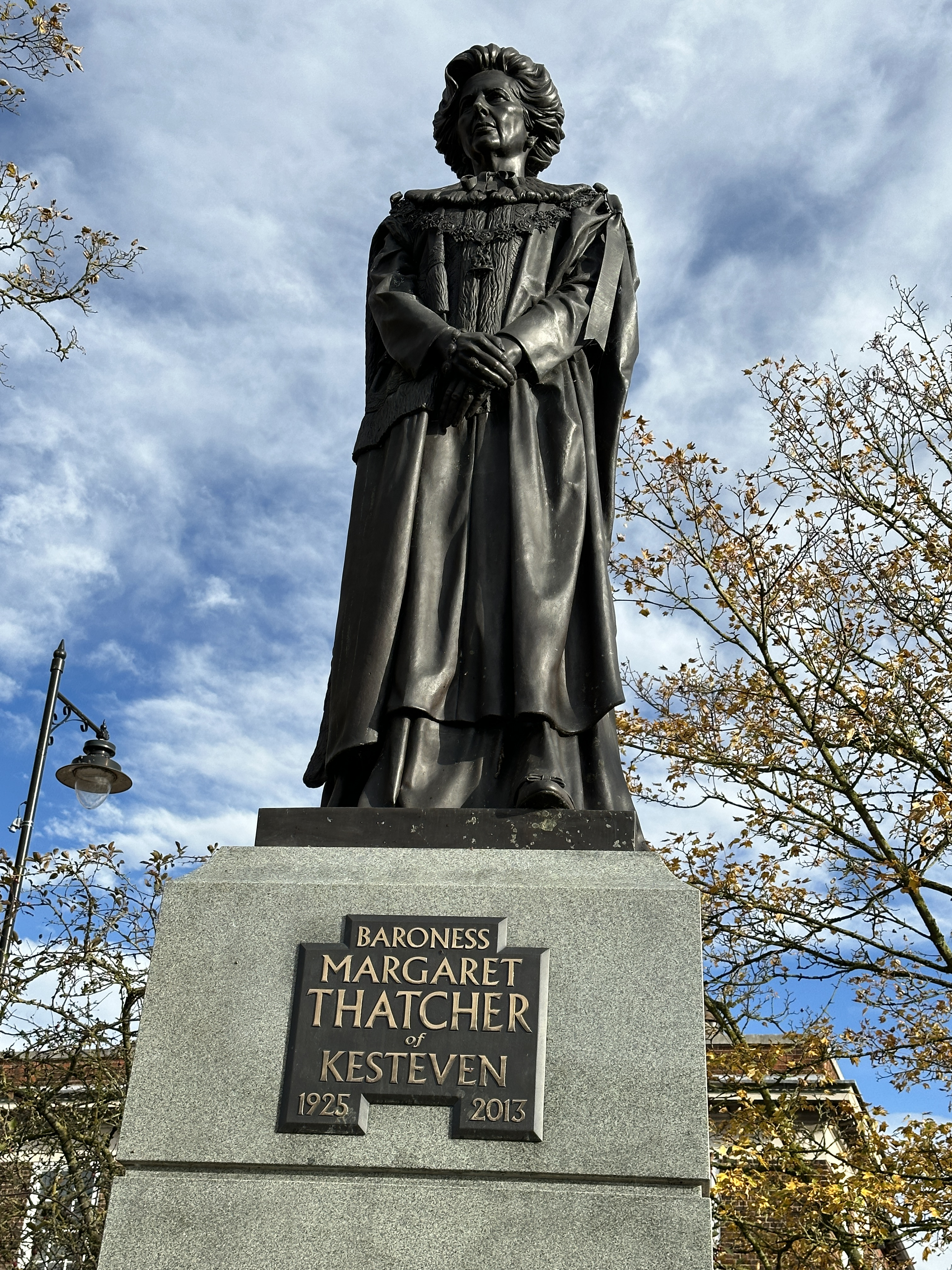
- Artist: Douglas Jennings
- Completion date: 15 May 2022; 4 years ago
- Medium: Bronze
- Subject: Margaret Thatcher
- Dimensions: 3.2 m (10 6 in)
- Location: Grantham, Lincolnshire, England; 52.9102°N 0.6405°W

A statue of Margaret Thatcher stands in her birthplace, the town of Grantham in Lincolnshire, England. The statue is 10 feet 6 inches (3.2 m) high, cast in bronze, and depicts the late British prime minister Baroness Thatcher, dressed in the full ceremonial robes of the House of Lords. It stands on a 10-foot-6-inch (3.2 m) plinth. Created by sculptor Douglas Jennings, and costing £300,000, it was erected on 15 May 2022, on St Peter's Hill Green, close to the Grantham Museum. Eggs were thrown at the statue within two hours of its installation, and a week later red paint was thrown at it. It was formally unveiled on 31 May.

Plans for a statue of Thatcher were announced in 2013, shortly before her death. The work by Douglas Jennings was initially intended to stand close to the Houses of Parliament, but it was rejected by Westminster City Council in 2018 when councillors said it was too soon after her death, commented about "monument saturation", and expressed fears that it would become a focus for "civil disobedience and vandalism".

== History ==
A proposal to erect the statue in Grantham was made in 2018 by the Grantham Community Heritage Association (GCHA), which runs the Grantham Museum, and approval was given in February 2019 by South Kesteven District Council. Funding was provided through a local appeal and contributions from a charity, the Public Memorials Appeal.

On 15 May 2022, the statue was installed on St Peter's Hill Green in Grantham, close to the Museum.

The statue was formally unveiled by the Mayor of Grantham, Graham Jeal, on 31 May. He said: "Mrs Thatcher was this country's first female prime minister. She was the first prime minister to have a science degree, and she was also the longest-serving prime minister of the 20th century. While we may not agree on everything, we must agree on these facts, and these are three facts that can never be taken away." A crowd of about 30 people, along with a bagpiper, attended the unveiling, together with several protesters.

== Vandalism ==
The statue was attacked with eggs on 15 May 2022, within two hours of its installation. Jeremy Webster, deputy director of the Attenborough Arts Centre at the University of Leicester, was alleged to have thrown the eggs. The university stated that it did not condone the action and would address the allegations in line with its procedures. A spokesperson for Lincolnshire Police said they had received reports of criminal damage, but there were no arrests. On 26 May, it was reported that Webster had been given a fixed penalty of £90 under Section 5 of the Public Order Act.

On 28 May 2022, days before the statue would be formally unveiled, the statue was splattered with red paint, and a hammer and sickle was painted on the surrounding fence. Lincolnshire Police stated the attack was being investigated.

In October 2022, the statue was vandalised for a third time when it was daubed with the words "Tories out", despite it being under CCTV surveillance. Pictures which subsequently circulated online, showing a dildo on top of the statue's head, proved to be fake.

In May 2023, an 18-year-old woman was charged with criminal damage and fined, after defacing the statue with the phrase "burn in hell".

In March 2024, Lincolnshire Police reported that the statue had been "defaced with a slur written in red paint".

== Reception ==
The Conservative leader of South Kesteven council, Kelham Cooke, said: "Margaret Thatcher will always be a significant part of Grantham's heritage... It is, therefore, appropriate that she is commemorated by her home town, and that the debate that surrounds her legacy takes place here in Grantham. We must never hide from our history, and this memorial will be a talking point for generations to come... We hope that this memorial will encourage others to visit Grantham and to see where she lived and visit the exhibition of her life in Grantham Museum."

The attacks on the statue were criticised by former Labour Party leader and Leader of the Opposition Neil Kinnock, who regularly confronted Thatcher in Parliament, saying, "The statue should be respected, full stop."
