= William Theed =

British sculptor (1804–1891)

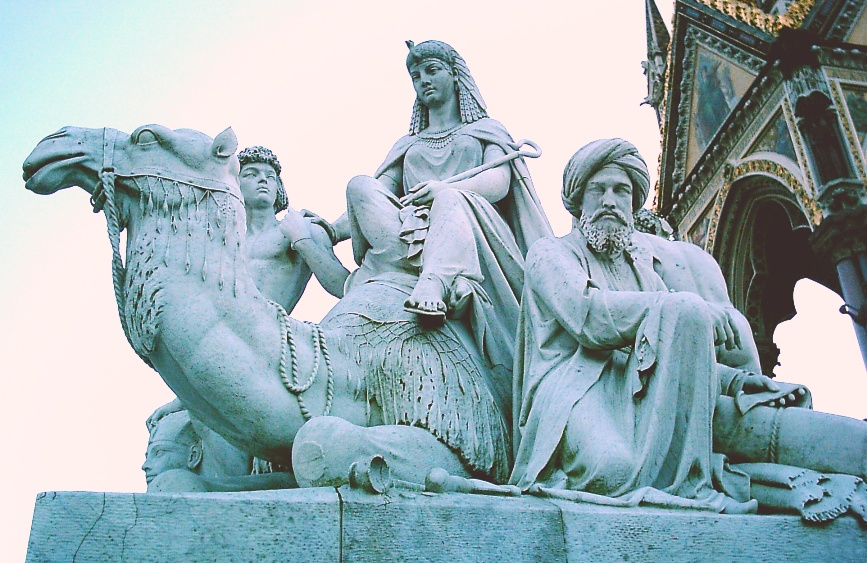
Africa group at the Albert Memorial

William Theed (1804 – 9 September 1891), also known as William Theed the younger, was a British sculptor, the son of the sculptor and painter William Theed the elder (1764–1817). He specialised in portraiture, and his services were extensively used by the Royal Family.

== Career ==
Theed was born in Trentham, Staffordshire. Initially trained by his father, Theed the younger worked for several years in the studio of EH Baily the sculptor, and on 15 January 1820 was admitted to the Royal Academy Schools. In 1826 he went to Rome.

In Rome, Theed is believed to have studied under the Danish sculptor Bertel Thorvaldsen and Italian Pietro Tenerani, as well as John Gibson and Richard James Wyatt. Here he worked in marble creating statues and busts, including those for the Duke of Lucca and the Prince and Princess of Capua. In 1844–5, after nearly 20 years in Rome, he received a commission from Prince Albert, then the prince consort, who had asked John Gibson (now a close friend of Theed) to send designs for statues to be placed in Osborne House. Two designs by Theed were accepted, Narcissus at the Fountain and Psyche Lamenting the Loss of Cupid both in marble.

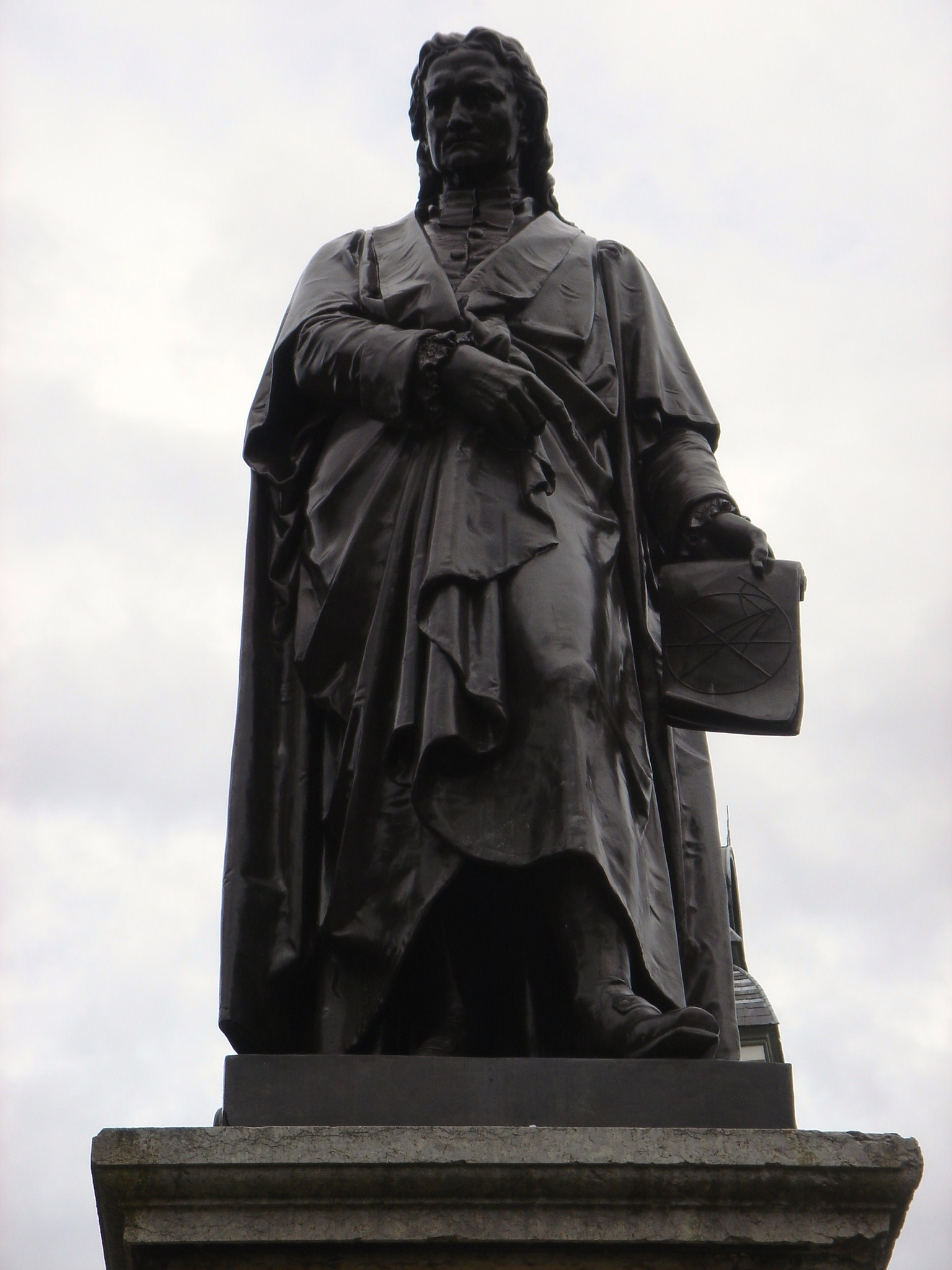
Sir Isaac Newton by William Theed, 1858, bronze; St Peter's Hill, Grantham

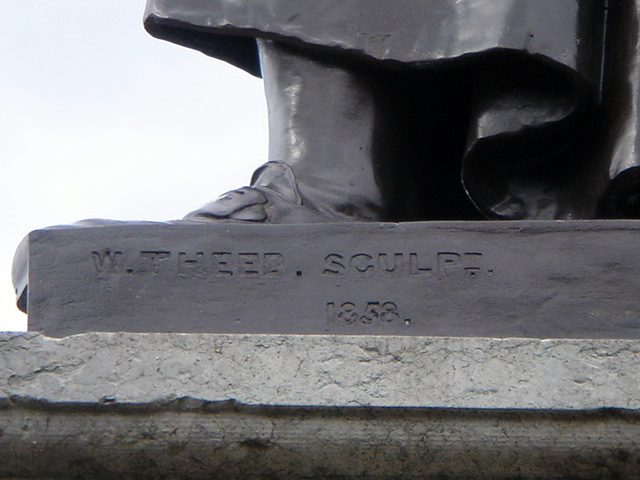
Sir Isaac Newton by William Theed; detail. The sculptor's signature appears on the statue base at the left along with the date.

Theed returned to London in 1848 and soon established a highly successful professional practice. He is known to have married, assumed to be around this time, a woman called Mary and had a son Edward, both listed in the 1881 census. In 1851 he displayed three pieces at the Great Exhibition, the most notable a marble of The Prodigal's Return, a life-size piece, elaborately carved. From London he made further pieces for the prince consort, including a series of mythological reliefs for the reception rooms of Buckingham Palace. Another notable piece for the Royal Family was a series of twelve bas-reliefs illustrating scenes from Tudor history, this time in bronze, which were made for the Prince's chamber in the Palace of Westminster.

=== Portrait sculpture ===
The major aspect of Theed's production, however, was portraiture, with which he received commissions for major commemorative statues. Most notably are:

- Sir Isaac Newton, a bronze (1858) which is at St Peter's Hill in Grantham (in front of Grantham Guildhall)
- Henry Hallam, a marble (1862) in St Paul's Cathedral
- Sir Herbert Benjamin Edwardes, a marble (1868) in Westminster Abbey
- John Dalton, a bronze (1855) outside Manchester Metropolitan University

For the Royal Family, he produced busts of:

- Victoria Mary Louise, Duchess of Kent, in marble (1861)
- Prince Albert in marble (1862)
- Queen Victoria, bronze (1864)

Having been appointed by Queen Victoria to take the death mask of the prince in 1861, he went on to produce several notable memorial statues including those at Balmoral Castle.

- Statue of Albert, Prince Consort, Balmoral Castle (1867)

==== Double portrait, Queen Victoria and Prince Albert ====
He also executed a sculpture of Queen Victoria and Prince Albert, of which a copy is in the National Portrait Gallery, London while the original is retained in the Royal Collection at the Royal Mausoleum, Frogmore.

The descriptive label beside the copy in the National Portrait Gallery reads:

"Queen Victoria and Prince Albert in Anglo-Saxon dress. Apparently prompted by a suggestion of Victoria, the Crown Princess of Prussia" ( Victoria, Princess Royal ) "this sculpture is thought to symbolise the ties between the German and English peoples from Anglo-Saxon times to the marriage of the Royal couple. By William Theed (1804-91). Plaster cast from the marble executed 1863-7. Lent by H.M. The Queen."

On the plinth of Theed's original in the Royal Collection is a single line (without attribution) from the poem 'The Deserted Village' by Oliver Goldsmith (l.170): "...Thus to relieve the wretched was his pride, / And e'en his failings lean'd to Virtue's side; / But in his duty prompt at every call, / He watch'd and wept, he pray'd and felt, for all. / And, as a bird each fond endearment tries / To tempt its new-fledg'd offspring to the skies, / He tried each art, reprov'd each dull delay, / ALLURED TO BRIGHTER WORLDS, AND LED THE WAY."(caps. added, as in the inscription)

Martin Greenwood's biographical article mentions that this sculpture, which had been completed for the Queen, is also known as 'The Parting'.

== Death ==
Theed had shown more than eighty works at the Royal Academy between 1824 and 1885, and from the 1840s had enjoyed the extensive patronage of the English royal family. He died of old age on 9 September 1891, at his home, Campden Lodge, Campden Hill, Kensington, London, with a wealth of £40,751.

== Awards ==
1820 Society of Arts Silver Palette - for a figure of Hercules
1822 Royal Academy Schools Silver Medal
1822 Society of Arts Silver Isis Medal
