= Edith Watson (police officer) =

- Born: 6 November 1888; London Borough of Hackney, England
- Died: 25 March 1966 (aged 77); Worthing, England
- Occupations: writer, Police officer
- Employer: Women's Freedom League
- Spouse: Ernest John Watson
- Children: one

Edith Mary Watson (née Wall; 6 November 1888 – 25 March 1966) was a British suffragist, police officer and campaigner against Female Genital Mutilation in the 1930s.

== Early life and education ==
Edith Mary Wall was born on 6 November 1888 in Hackney Union Workhouse in the London Borough of Hackney, to Martha Wall, an unmarried domestic servant. Martha married after Edith's birth, and the young Edith grew up in Marylebone with her mother and step family. She attended Bell Street board school and Hampden Gurney School, and assisted her mother in sewing buttons onto shirts to earn income for the family.

At age fourteen she left school and was employed as a children's nurse in South Africa. She became a Salvation Army captain, and formed her political ambitions when she was nearly raped by a fellow member. She left South Africa and the Salvation Army in 1909 and her allegiance moved to socialism. She married a Post Office worker named Ernest John Watson in 1912 and used Watson as her surname from then on. The couple had a son in 1919 but later divorced.

== Campaigning career ==
Watson had joined the Women's Freedom League in 1911. She continued the league's non-violent methods by writing for the left-wing Daily Herald under the title of Sketches in Green, Gold and White.

She and Nina Boyle wrote for The Vote, where they argued against the injustices of a male-dominated legal system. Women victims needed to be cared for by women police and courts should realise that they could not expect women to give evidence in a court that was a room full of men. Watson decided to document what she saw as unfair practice. She was employed as the Court correspondent for The Vote and she recorded the crimes or rape, sexual assault and incest ironically under the title of "The Protected Sex". She catalogued the sentences given to the perpetrators noting that prostitutes could get nine months for approaching clients whereas a man guilty of grievously harming a woman might get a third of the sentence. She started this work in 1912 and continued for three years to compare the sentences with those handed down for loss or damage to property. Boyle and Watson went to Marlborough Street Police Court in 1914 and made a more militant protest. Watson was amongst other who were arrested for chaining themselves to the gates.

Between 1914 and 1916, Watson served in the Women’s Volunteer Police Service, which she co-founded with Nina Boyle.

She was a campaigner against Female Genital Mutilation in the 1930s. She wanted to have the practice banned inside the British Empire.

== Death and legacy ==
Watson died in a nursing home in Worthing in 1966.

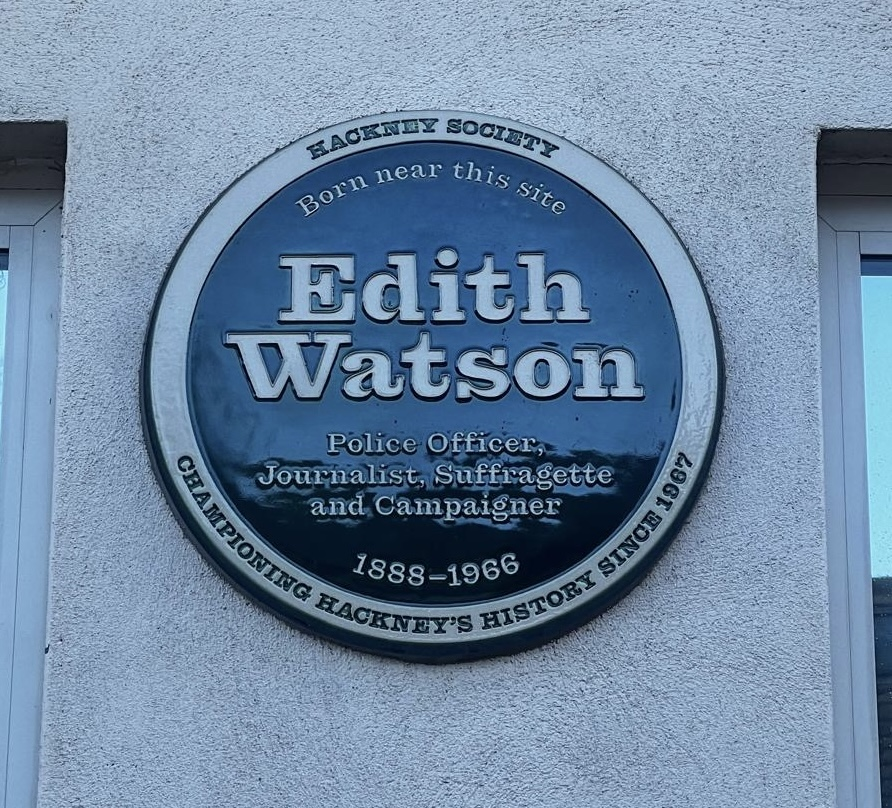
Commemorative Plaque on Homerton High Street for Edith Watson

Watson's legacy in Hackney, London will be honoured by a celebratory plaque commissioned by the Hackney Society. This inaugural plaques scheme will feature plaques for three local female community activists including Watson, Clara Ludski, founder of the Rio Cinema and journalist and anti-oppression community activist, Andrea Enisuoh.

== Archives ==
The archives of Edith Mary Watson can be found at the Library of the London School of Economics (ref 7EMW).
