= Mary Sophia Allen =

British suffragette and fascist (1878–1964)

Mary Sophia Allen OBE
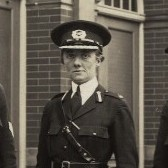
- Born: 12 March 1878; Cardiff, Wales
- Died: 16 December 1964 (aged 86); Croydon, London, England
- Organisation(s): Women's Social and Political Union; Women's Police Service

Mary Sophia Allen OBE (12 March 1878 – 16 December 1964) was a British political activist known for her defence of women's rights in the 1910–1920s and later involvement with British fascism. She is chiefly noted as one of the early leaders of the Women's Police Volunteers. Allen repeatedly sought to challenge or modernise the existing systems of the time, ensuring the Women's Police Service could become an auxiliary force after women were admitted into certain British police forces. She stood once for the House of Commons as an Independent Liberal, turning over her Women's Auxiliary Service to breaking the General Strike of 1926. Thereafter she met and talked with European fascists and anti-communist brigades, entailing frequent trips abroad and publicly joining the British Union of Fascists in 1939. In retirement, Allen was an activist for animal rights.

== Early years ==
Allen was born to a well-to-do family in Cardiff in 1878, one of the ten children of Thomas Isaac Allen, Chief Superintendent of the Great Western Railway. Allen was close to her sisters, all of whom had a tendency to religious mysticism. She was educated at home and later at Princess Helena College. She left home at the age of thirty in 1908 after a disagreement with her father about women's suffrage. She did not return home until he died in December 1911.

Allen joined Emmeline Pankhurst's Women's Social and Political Union, becoming an organiser in the South West, and later in Edinburgh and, by 1913, in Hastings. She was imprisoned three times in 1909 for smashing windows, including at the Inland Revenue and Liberal Club in Bristol and at the Home Office, twice went on hunger-strike, and was force-fed on the last occasion, for which she was awarded a Hunger Strike Medal 'for Valour' by Emmeline Pethick-Lawrence.

Whilst in prison, Allen and others sewed prison shirts with secretly embroidered messages such as 'Votes for Women' in the shirt tails.

== First World War ==
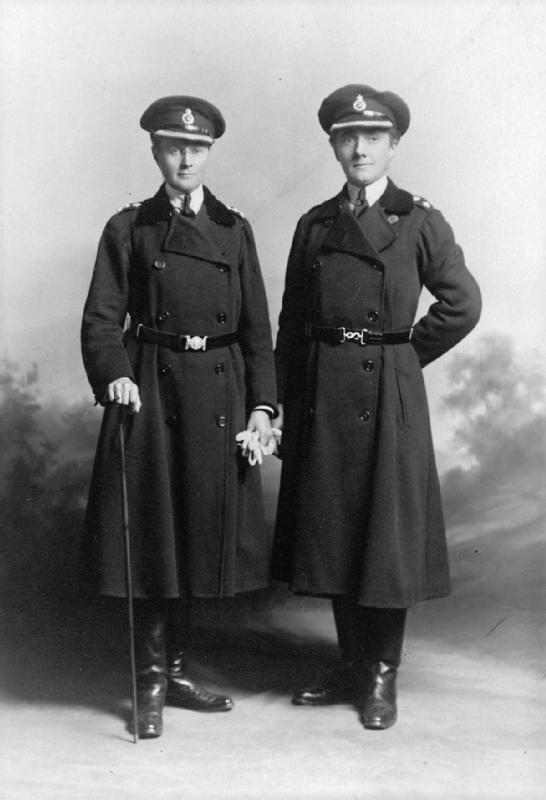
Allen (right) and Margaret Damer Dawson during World War I

At the outbreak of the First World War, militant suffragist activities ceased. Allen turned down an offer of work with a needlework guild (similar to the Queen Mother's Clothing Guild) and looked around for a more active occupation. She heard that a number of women were working to establish a women's police force and, in 1914, she joined Nina Boyle's Women Police Volunteers. This was taken over by Margaret Damer Dawson in 1915 and renamed the Women Police Service (WPS), with Allen as second-in-command. They designed their own uniform and opened training schools in London and Bristol. They saw their role as mainly dealing with women and children and rescuing women from "vice" (prostitution) and 'white slavery'. Allen served at Grantham and Kingston upon Hull, overseeing the morals of women around army barracks. She went on to police wartime munitions factories which employed large numbers of women. She also worked in London, where 'khaki fever' (women swooning over soldiers) was perceived as a problem. Child welfare work led the WPS to set up a benevolent department and a home for mothers and babies. Allen was awarded the OBE for services during the War.

Allen and Commandant Margaret Damer Dawson cropped their hair and assumed a severe military appearance, and Allen wore her police uniform in public for the rest of her life. In 1915 Dawson made a will which left everything to Allen; when Dawson died unexpectedly in 1920, Allen assumed the role of WPS Commandant. After the War, the WPS was expected to disband, as the authorities saw no further need for it. The Metropolitan Police (the Met) set up its own women's division and accused the WPS of masquerading as Metropolitan policewomen. The Metropolitan Police prosecuted the WPS for wearing official police uniform and the WPS had to adjust their uniform design as a result of a case at Westminster Police Court in April 1921. The authorities decided that her activities, which included producing dossiers on left-wing activists, were harmless and she should be allowed to continue wearing it.

The WPS changed their name to the Women's Auxiliary Service (WAS) and, with minor modifications to their uniform, carried on as before, setting up a further training school in Edinburgh. The Government appointed the Baird Committee to investigate the activities of the WAS. Despite no longer being recognised by the authorities, Allen was invited by the Government to travel to Germany and advise on the policing of the British Army of the Rhine. This semi-acceptance encouraged her to represent herself overseas as chief of the British women police. She travelled in uniform and was welcomed by police authorities in Europe and in South and North America.

== Politics ==
In November 1922 Allen stood unsuccessfully for Parliament as a candidate for Westminster St George's. During the General Strike of 1926 Allen was involved with the Organisation for the Maintenance of Supplies and turned her Women's Auxiliary Service over to the strike-breaking movement.

Allen learned to fly. She attended international police congresses in Austria and Germany. She also visited the Netherlands, Hungary, Czechoslovakia, Turkey and Brazil, advising on the training of police women. She travelled to Egypt in 1936 on holiday (wearing her uniform), but was received as if sent by the police authorities in Britain. Her interest in combatting prostitution continued to be a preoccupation, and she attended the League of Nations conference in Geneva on the traffic in women. Wherever she went, she was perceived by many as the leading British policewoman. She did nothing to discourage the impression, and made contact with police chiefs and political leaders all over Europe.

Allen in 1922

The Home Office began to take an interest in Allen's activities in 1927. She was becoming an embarrassment and a nuisance to the Government, partly because of her acceptance abroad as representing the British authorities, and partly because she was mistaken for a Metropolitan police officer at home. Home Office records covering the period 1927–1934 reveal that she kept dossiers on people she suspected of activities connected with vice and white slavery. She was also suspected of fascist activities, and articles by or about her in national newspapers increased the Home Office surveillance.

Allen met a number of fascist leaders abroad, including Eoin O'Duffy in Ireland, Franco in Spain, Mussolini in Italy, and Hitler and Göring in Germany. Although her links to Oswald Mosley's British Union of Fascists were unofficial until 1939, she engaged in various militant activities, including the formation of the Women's Reserve in 1933, which was intended to resist leftist sedition and insurrection. The publicity for the Women's Reserve reveals her fascist sympathies, and her fear of communism.

She met Hitler in 1934 and discussed women police with him. She was captivated by Hitler and was vocal in her admiration. Once she had joined the British Union of Fascists (BUF), she wrote numerous enthusiastic articles for its newspapers. Suspicions arose about her contacts with Germany, and a Suspension Order was made against her under the Defence of the Realm Act. Her home was searched, and internment was considered, but not enforced. She was suspected of making flights to Germany, and acting as a spy for the Nazis, but this was never proven.

Following the outbreak of World War II Allen joined the Women's Voluntary Service but also became a regular speaker at BUF peace rallies. Outrage followed with Daily Herald, Daily Mirror and News Chronicle stories calling for Allen's removal from the WVS, particularly after comments in which she refused to condemn Hitler. Due to her close connections to Mosley and Barry Domvile, Special Branch regarded Allen with some suspicion. There were also questions in the House of Commons from the Labour MP Glenvil Hall in June 1940 as to whether Allen's continued nominal presence on the Advisory Council of the Women's Voluntary Service represented a security risk. After a review of her activities and a study of her personality and associates, the government declined to detain her under Defence Regulation 18B. The final report was dismissive, describing her as a "crank...trailing round in a ridiculous uniform". Eventually however she was placed under light detention as a precaution, being restricted to within a five-mile radius of her Cornwall home and banned from using cars, bicycles, telephones and the wireless.

== Personal life ==
Allen was known as 'Robert' by her close circle of female friends, and she was called 'Sir' by her officers. Her friends included Margaret Damer Dawson, Isobel Goldingham and Helen Bourn Tagart, all of whom she met in her policing days. She wrote three volumes of autobiography: The Pioneer Policewoman (1925), A Woman at the Cross Roads (1934), and Lady in Blue (1936). A Woman at the Cross Roads reveals aspects of her life and philosophy but is reticent about her private life. It was written at the time when Allen met Hitler, and her political views are made plain: she was at a crossroads in her life because she was looking at fascism as a solution to the world problems that she perceived. She also wrote numerous articles for newspapers and magazines, and founded The Policewomen’s Review, which ran from 1927 to 1937, to which she was a major contributor.

Few details of Allen's personal life are available after the Second World War. She continued to be associated with Mosley and other fascists, including Norah Elam with whom she shared a lifelong friendship. Both had been members of the WSPU, and as militant suffragettes had undergone force feeding. They both turned to animal activism after the demise of the Mosley movement, being staunch anti-vivisectionists and members of the London and Provincial Anti-Vivisection Society. She always had a strong interest in religion, without any particular affiliation. She converted to Roman Catholicism in 1953, and died in a nursing home in Croydon at age 86, attended by her sister Christine.

Allen's biographer Nina Boyd suggests that in the novel That Hideous Strength by C. S. Lewis, the character of "Fairy" Hardcastle is based on Allen: she is a sadistic, epicene ex-suffragette turned security director for a tyrannical scientific organisation.

== Sources ==
- Allen, Mary S. (1925) The Pioneer Policewoman, London: Chatto & Windus
- Allen, Mary S. and Heyneman, Julie H. (1934) A Woman at the Cross Roads, London: Unicorn Press
- Allen, Mary S. (1936) Lady in Blue, London: Stanley Paul
- National Archives, PRO HO144/21933
- Boyd, Nina (2013), From Suffragette to Fascist: The Many Lives of Mary Sophia Allen, Stroud: The History Press
