= Grantham Museum =

Museum in Grantham, Lincolnshire, England

Coordinates: 52°54′38″N 0°38′24″W

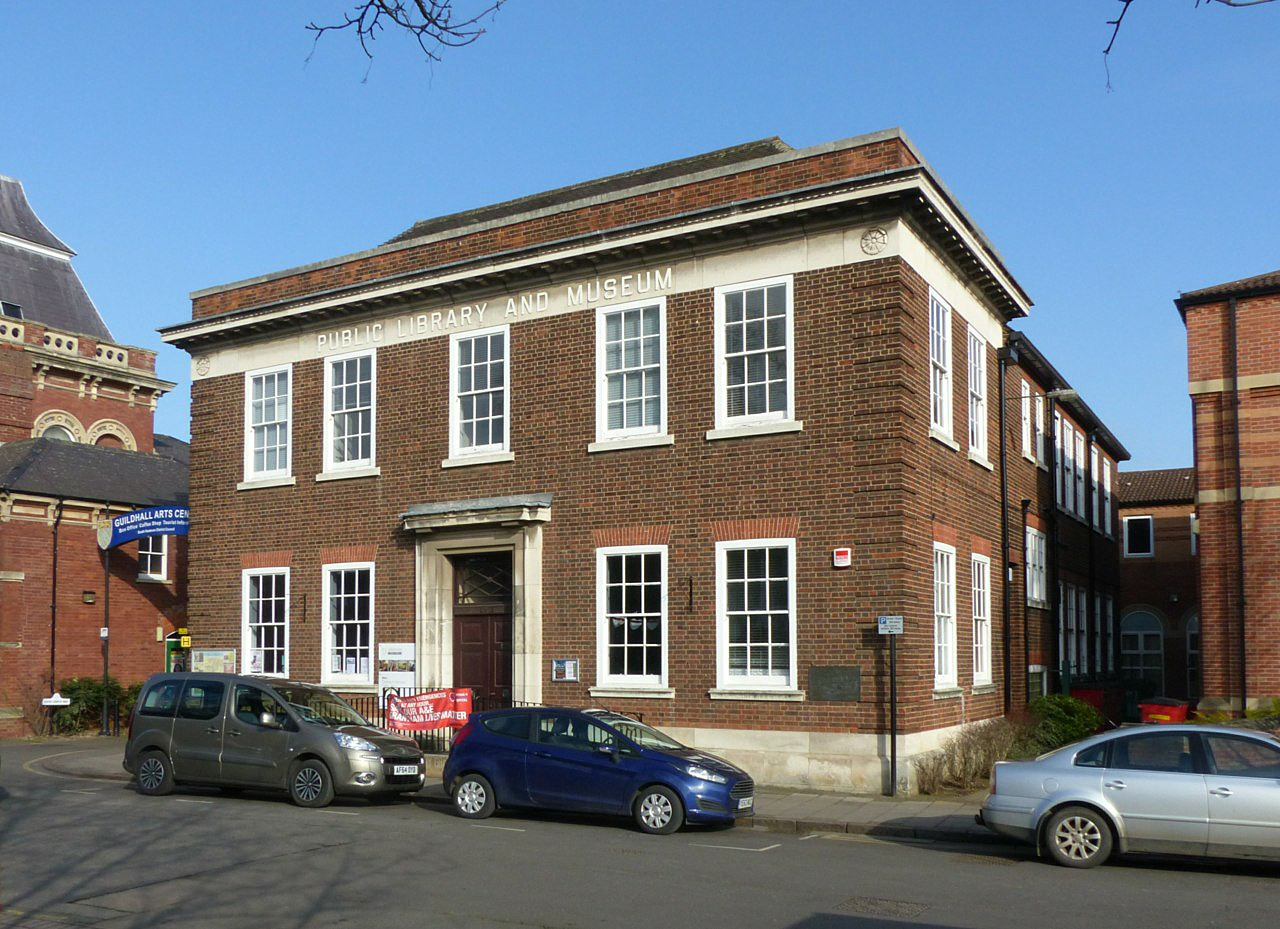
Grantham Museum

Grantham Museum is located at St Peter's Hill, Grantham, Lincolnshire, England, housed in the town's former Carnegie Library, which it moved into in 1926.

== History ==
The museum's current building previously housed the public library, and was partly funded by the Carnegie UK Trust which was continuing Andrew Carnegie's project of building libraries across the United Kingdom. The library was built by architects Gilbert A. Ballard and H.A. Gold. Grantham's library is now in the Isaac Newton Centre, and the museum occupies the whole of the previous library building. The idea for the museum can be traced back to meetings of the Grantham Scientific society in the 1890s.

The museum is currently managed by the Grantham Community Heritage Association (GCHA). This charity was formed in 2011 to take over the management of the museum from Lincolnshire County Council with a view to reopening the facility for the Queen's Jubilee in June 2012.

In 2013, a few months before the death of Margaret Thatcher, the GCHA announced plans to raise funds to obtain a statue of the former prime minister. The statue was installed on St Peter's Hill Green, close to the museum, in 2022, on a 3.2-metre (10 ft) tall plinth to discourage vandalism. The statue was egged within hours of its installation.

== Collection ==
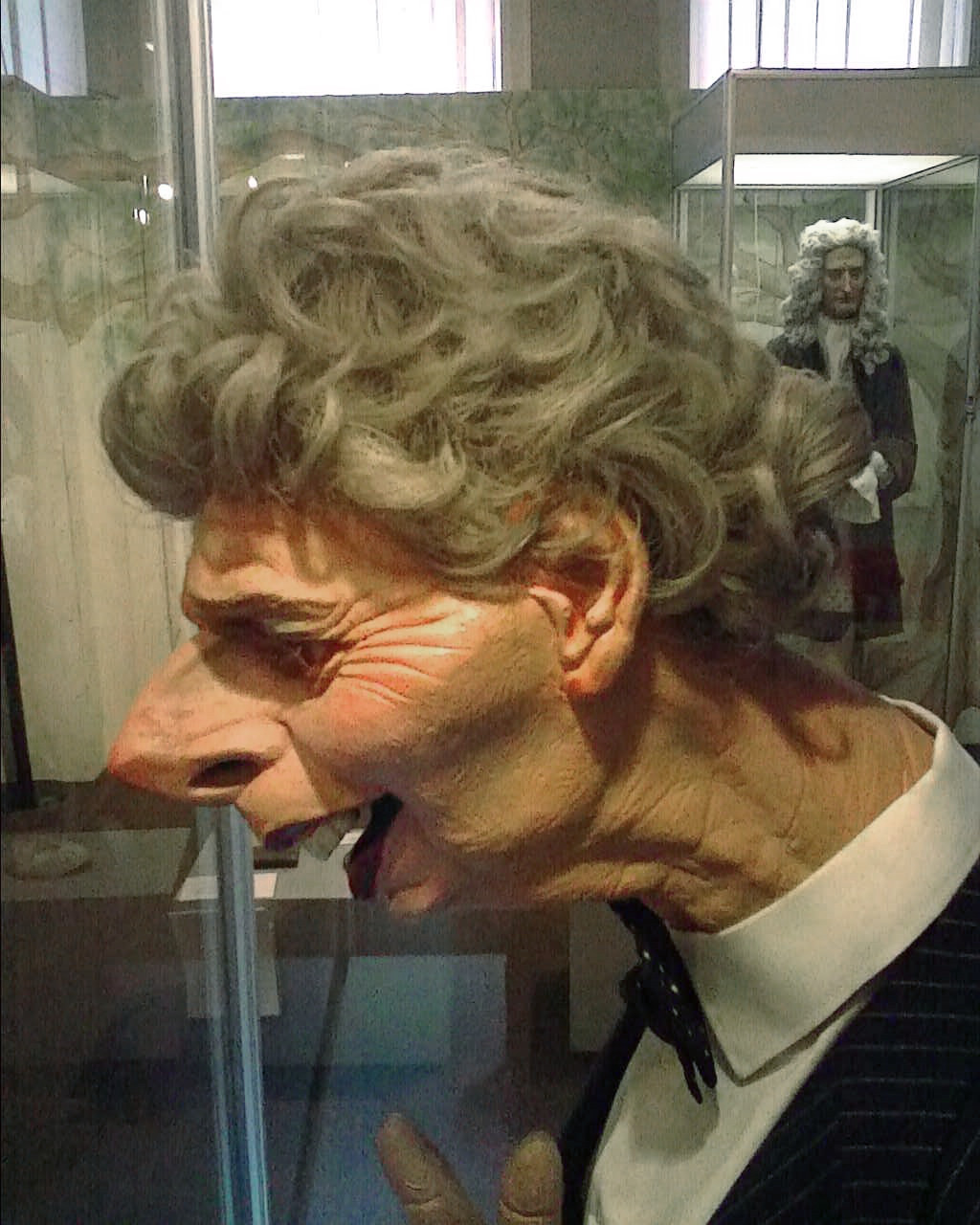
Puppet of Margaret Thatcher from the British satirical television puppet show Spitting Image and puppet of Sir Isaac Newton in the back on display

The basis of the collection is material provided by Henry Preston, the first Curator and Founder, and twentieth century additions included material about Sir Isaac Newton (who went to school in Grantham), Edith Smith (who became the UK's first female police officer in Grantham), and Margaret Thatcher (who was born and raised in Grantham). There is also material about the Dambusters Raid. The museum hosts a variety of exhibitions during the year.
