= Nina Boyle =

British writer and campaigner

- Born: Constance Antonina Boyle; 21 December 1865; Bexley, Kent, England
- Died: 4 March 1943 (aged 77); Cromwell Road, London, England
- Resting place: Golders Green Crematorium
- Occupations: Journalist, writer and activist
- Known for: First woman to attempt to stand for election to the UK Parliament
- Political party: Conservative
- Movement: Women's suffrage

Constance Antonina Boyle (21 December 1865 – 4 March 1943) was a British journalist, campaigner for women's suffrage and women's rights, charity and welfare worker, and novelist. She was one of the pioneers of female police officers in Britain. In April 1918, she was the first woman to submit a nomination to stand for election to the House of Commons, paving the way for other female candidates in the December 1918 general election.

== Family ==
Nina Boyle was born in Bexley, Kent. She was a descendant of the Earls of Glasgow through her father, Robert Boyle (1830-1869), who was a captain in the Royal Artillery and the younger son of David Boyle, Lord Boyle. Her mother, Frances Sydney Fremoult Sankey, was the daughter of a medical doctor. Nina Boyle never married and did not have any children.

== Life ==
=== Women's Freedom League activism ===
Two of Boyle's brothers served in the Boer War while she lived in South Africa. She did hospital work in Africa and was employed as a journalist. While in South Africa, she also began to pursue her interest in women's rights, founding the Women's Enfranchisement League of Johannesburg. She returned to Britain in 1911 and, drawing upon her experiences in South Africa, became active in the Colonial Intelligence League for Educated Women, headed by Princess Christian, a daughter of Queen Victoria. The League was set up to help women who had received a good formal education to make use of their skills where they might otherwise be ignored- in British territories, and once they had returned home.

Boyle had radical opinions about how women's position in society could be improved. She was soon associated with the Women's Freedom League (WFL) along with other well-known suffragettes, including Charlotte Despard, Teresa Billington-Greig, Edith How-Martyn and Margaret Nevinson. Boyle was quickly elected to the WFL's executive committee and became one of its leading speakers. By 1912, she was its secretary. The WFL was a breakaway organisation from the Women's Social and Political Union (WSPU), formed in 1907. The WFL split from WSPU due to the Pankhurst family's increasingly personal control of the WSPU and the violent tactics used by the WSPU. The WFL preferred civil disobedience and traditional campaigning.

When the 1911 census was taken, Boyle resisted the census and wrote "No Votes. No Census. Votes for Women" on her form. The next year, in 1912, Boyle became head of the WFL's political and militant department. She continued her journalism, publishing many articles in the WFL's newspaper, The Vote and employing Edith Watson as a campaigning court correspondent. She and Watson argued against the injustices of the male-dominated legal system. They protested that women victims needed to be cared for by women police. Courts should realise that they could not expect women and girls to give evidence in a court that was a room full of men. Watson began to document unfair practices. She recorded the crimes or rape, sexual assault and incest in a column, ironically, under the title of "The Protected Sex". Watson continued for three years to compare the sentences with those handed down for loss or damage to property. In 1913 she wrote the book The Traffic in Women: Unchallenged facts and figures for the League.

Boyle took a leading role in the WFL's campaigns and demonstrations. She was arrested on several more occasions and imprisoned three times. She protested against the conditions under which she and a fellow suffragist were taken to prison after being arrested for obstruction in 1913 and sentenced to 14 days imprisonment. Their prison van contained men who made lewd remarks and gestures. In 1914, before the outbreak of war and cessation of suffragette militancy, Boyle and Watson went to Marlborough Street Magistrates Court and made a more militant protest. Watson was one of the ones arrested for chaining themselves to the court gates.

=== First World War ===
As a result of her experience at the hands of the police and within the criminal justice system, and consistent with WFL policy on equal employment opportunities, Boyle started a campaign for women to become special constables. This campaign coincided with the outbreak of the First World War in 1914 and the call for volunteers for the war effort which Boyle wished to see taken up by women as well as men. When the request was officially refused, Boyle, together with Margaret Damer Dawson, a wealthy philanthropist and herself a campaigner for women's rights, established the first voluntary women's police force, the Women Police Volunteers (WPV). However, in February 1915, Boyle split from the organisation over the use of the WPV to enforce a curfew on women of so-called 'loose character' near a service base in Grantham.

In late 1916, Boyle went to Macedonia and Serbia on hospital duty. She also performed other war relief work in the Balkans, for which she was awarded the Samaritan Order of Serbia and the Allied Medal. After the Russian Revolution, she travelled in Russia with fellow suffragette Lilian Lenton, an experience which would make her a lifelong anti-Communist.

==== Keighley by-election ====
In March 1918, the Liberal MP for Keighley in the West Riding of Yorkshire, Sir Swire Smith, died, causing a by-election. Although women over thirty had gained the vote in 1918, there was some doubt as to whether women were eligible to stand for parliament. Boyle made known her intention to stand as a candidate for the WFL at Keighley and, if refused, to take the matter to the courts for a definitive ruling. After some legal consideration, the returning officer stated that he was prepared to accept her nomination, thus establishing an important precedent for women candidates. However, he ruled her nomination papers invalid on other grounds: one of the signatories to her nomination was not on the electoral roll and another lived outside the constituency. While Boyle did not, therefore, appear on the ballot paper, she claimed a moral victory for women's suffrage rights. The Law Lords were asked to consider the matter and concluded that the Great Reform Act 1832 had specifically banned women from standing as parliamentary candidates. The Representation of the People Act passed earlier in the year, did not change that.

Parliament hurriedly passed the Parliament (Qualification of Women) Act 1918 in time to enable women to stand in the general election of December 1918. The act ran to only 27 operative words: "A woman shall not be disqualified by sex or marriage for being elected to or sitting or voting as a Member of the Commons House of Parliament", and is the shortest UK statute.

=== Post-war ===
After 1918, Boyle remained active in a number of important women's organisations. She campaigned or addressed meetings on behalf of the National Union of Women Teachers, the Women's Election Committee, the Open Door Council (which aimed to remove protective barriers that restricted women's employment opportunities) and also organisations concerned with the welfare of women and children in developing countries. She was particularly active in the Save the Children Fund (SCF), and in 1921 she went to the USSR to work in an SCF famine relief programme. She used her position in the SCF to raise the issue of sex slavery and trafficking of women for prostitution. She made many speeches as a SCF representative and wrote frequent articles for SCF publications as well as the book What is Slavery? An Appeal to Women, published in Croydon in 1931 by H R. Grubb. She also supported the work of the Association for Moral and Social Hygiene, an organisation that campaigned against the exploitation of prostitutes and their welfare.

After the war and the winning of women's political rights, Boyle, like many ex-suffragettes turned to the right politically, though not to the same extent as her former associate Mary Allen who became a member of the British Union of Fascists. Boyle was a speaker at a meeting of the anti-German and anti-immigrant British Empire Union (BEU) in 1921, and shared a meeting with Margaret Lloyd George later that year. In the by-election for the Abbey Division of Westminster held on 25 August 1921, she spoke in favour of the victorious Conservative candidate, John Sanctuary Nicholson. During the Second World War, she was also active in the Never Again Association, a body similar to the BEU that campaigned for the dismemberment of Germany and the expulsion from Britain of all persons born in Axis countries.

=== Death and legacy ===
Boyle died on 4 March 1943, aged 77 in a nursing home at 99 Cromwell Road, London. She was cremated at Golders Green on 9 March.

For some years after her death, Bedford College offered a Nina Boyle Memorial Prize for the best essay on a subject connected with the position and work of women. It is now offered by Royal Holloway, University of London (which merged with Bedford College) to a student in either the History or Social Policy departments.

== List of novels ==
Apart from her journalistic and campaign-related publications, Boyle mostly wrote adventure or mystery novels. Though not critically acclaimed, her novels featured strong, capable female characters and were popular enough to merit continued publication. The first significant scholarly appraisal of Boyle's fiction appeared in 2024.

- Out of the Frying Pan - Allen and Unwin, London 1920
- What Became of Mr Desmond - Allen and Unwin, London 1922
- Nor All Thy Tears - Allen and Unwin, London 1923
- Anna's - Allen and Unwin, London 1925
- Moteley's Concession: A Tale of Torronascar - Allen and Unwin, London 1926
- The Stranger Within the Gates - Allen and Unwin, London 1926
- The Rights of Mallaroche - Allen and Unwin, London 1927
- Treading on Eggs - Stanley Paul & Co., London 1929
- My Lady's Bath - Stanley Paul & Co., London 1931
- The Late Unlamented - Stanley Paul & Co., London 1931
- How Could They? - Stanley Paul & Co., London 1932
- Good Old Potts! – Stanley Paul & Co., London 1934
