= Statue of Albert, Prince Consort, Balmoral Castle =

A statue of Albert, Prince Consort stands in the grounds of Balmoral Castle. It was based on a sculpture by William Theed and was unveiled in 1867.

== Unveiling ==
The statue was unveiled at 11:15 am on 15 October 1867 in a ceremony attended by Queen Victoria and her family, accompanied by her friend Jane Loftus, Marchioness of Ely. All the servants and tenants of the Balmoral Estate were present, as well as a detachment of the 93rd Highlanders. The date was the 28th anniversary of the engagement of Albert and Queen Victoria. Victoria described the weather as "distressing rain, which twice had given hopes of ceasing". Two verses of the Psalm 100 were sung by the assembled gathering, and a prayer offered by a Mr. Taylor. The cover shrouding the statue was caught as it was removed, a similar occurrence had happened during the unveiling of the statue of Albert in Aberdeen. After pipes were played by the Highlanders, a speech by a Dr. Robertson thanked Victoria for the statue on behalf of the Balmoral tenants and servants. The ceremony concluded with the singing of "God Save the Queen", "sung extremely well" according to Victoria.

Victoria described the unveiling in her 1884 book More Leaves From the Journal of a Life in the Highlands which covered her time in Scotland from 1862 to 1882.

The unveiling of the statue was photographed by W. & D. Downey. It depicts Victoria and her family under umbrellas on the rainy day of the unveiling. To the right of the statue is a Highland regiment of soldiers.

== Description ==
The statue depicts Albert dressed in plaid with a kilt. He has one hand on his dog and holds a rifle in his other hand. It stands on a rocky pedestal of granite. The statue is cast in bronze and is based on an 1862 marble statue of Albert by William Theed that stands in Balmoral. it was cast in bronze by Elkingtons of Birmingham. The statue is inscribed 'Albert Scot 1867'.

The statue has been listed Category A by Historic Environment Scotland since March 2010.
