= Margaret Damer Dawson =

English animal rights activist, anti-vivisectionist and philanthropist

Margaret Damer Dawson OBE
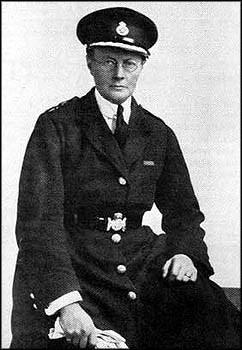
- Margaret Damer Dawson in her Women Police Service uniform (circa 1917)
- Born: 12 June 1873; Burgess Hill, West Sussex, England
- Died: 18 May 1920 (aged 46)
- Education: London Academy of Music
- Title: Officer of the Most Excellent Order of the British Empire
- Relatives: Thomas de Grey, 6th Baron Walsingham (step-father)

Margaret Mary Damer Dawson OBE (12 June 1873 – 18 May 1920) was an English animal rights activist, anti-vivisectionist and philanthropist who co-founded the first British Women's Police Service.

== Early life ==
Margaret Dawson was born on 12 June 1873 to a wealthy family in Burgess Hill and grew up in Hove. After her father, Richard Dawson, died her mother remarried, becoming Lady Walsingham. Her step-father was Thomas de Grey, 6th Baron Walsingham. Dawson had a private income and studied music with the Austrian pianist Benno Schoenberger at the London Academy of Music. She became involved in anti-vivisection and other causes and founded a home for foundlings. She was awarded silver medals by Finland and Denmark for her campaigning work for animal rights.

== Career ==
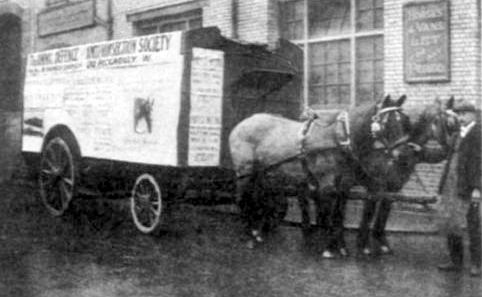
A horse and cart belonging to the Animal Defence and Anti-Vivisection Society was driven by Dawson.

Dawson was honorary secretary of the International Anti-Vivisection Council founded in 1908 by Lizzy Lind af Hageby, and together they organised the International Anti-Vivisection and Animal Protection Congress in London in July 1909. As Honorary Organising Secretary of the Animal Defence and Anti-Vivisection Society. The organisation campaigned against cruelty and the socially acceptable circus performing animals and the slaughter of animals for meat. In 1911 she was living with prominent ant-vivisectionist Lizzy Lind af Hageby.

In 1914 she and Nina Boyle founded the Women Police Volunteers (WPV), but a year later the pair split due to disagreements over the organisation's role. Dawson founded and led a new organisation, the Women's Police Service (renamed the Women's Auxiliary Service after the First World War), though Boyle's WPV continued some patrols. Dawson and her second-in-command, Mary Sophia Allen, were both awarded an Order of the British Empire in 1918. Dawson and Allen had lived together during the first World War, having a close professional and personal relationship.

Dawson was also asked to advise the Baird Commission when it looked at the role women in policing. She and many of her followers had been excluded from being on the Baird Committee on the advice of the Police Commissioner who disliked lesbians and in particular Dawson. but Dawson did provide a testimony to the Committee. Dawson thought that the women's police force should be entirely separate from the male service, but her view did not prevail.

== Death and legacy ==
Dawson died unexpectedly of a heart attack on 18 May 1920. Her leadership role was taken over by Allen, who had been Dawson's assistant for many years. Allen also inherited Dawson's house and most of her money.

Dawson was buried in Lympne on 22 May 1920 after a funeral attended by other women police officers. A memorial was erected in the corner of Lympne churchyard. Her finances had dwindled as she had spent money on the voluntary police service. Her friend and colleague Catherine Victoria Hall was later buried with her at Lympne.

== Commemorations ==
Dawson's house at 10 Cheyne Walk has a plaque to commemorate her. A bird bath, installed in Cheyne Walk, was organised by Miss St John Partridge and designed by Charles Pibworth It has since been restored and incorporates a quote from Rime of the Ancient Mariner "He prayeth best who lovest best all things great and small".
