= Women's Police Service =

The Women's Police Service (WPS) in the UK was a national voluntary organization of women police officers that was active from 1914 until 1940. As the first uniformed women's police service in the UK, it made progress in gaining acceptance of women's role in police work.

== Women Police Volunteers ==
Before the First World War, campaigners for women's rights had proposed there should be female as well as male police officers. In 1883 the Metropolitan Police had employed one woman to visit female prisoners under supervision. By 1889, 16 women were employed to supervise female and child offenders in police stations (a job formerly done by officers’ wives).

Several women’s movements campaigned for more representation in policing; however the outbreak of war prevented any progress. In 1914, Nina Boyle and Damer Dawson met when Damer Dawson was working for the Criminal Law Amendment Committee in 1914. Both Boyle and Dawson had observed the trouble faced in London by Belgian and French refugees, particularly the danger of their being recruited for prostitution on arrival at railway stations. They were also concerned about existing prostitutes loitering near railway stations used by the increasing number of servicemen passing through the capital.

Boyle and Damer Dawson sought and gained the approval of Sir Edward Henry, Commissioner of Police of the Metropolis to form the Women Police Volunteers (WPV) which would train women to patrol London on a voluntary basis. The volunteers would offer advice and support to women and children to help prevent sexual harassment and abuse. Boyle led the organisation with Dawson as assistant. Boyle herself was one of the first women to appear in a police uniform. As well as the Women Police Volunteers, women from the National Union of Women Workers, became the National Council of Women, were allowed to officially patrol the streets of London and to assist women in need, with men of the Metropolitan Police and other forces asked to assist them. They had no weapons and no power of arrest.

== Tensions over WPV's role ==
Boyle's background was in the Women's Freedom League (WFL) and so for her the WPV was an opportunity for women to assist in catching criminals and to challenge male control of law enforcement, particularly in relation to sexual issues, ie, as an instrument to help and support women rather than to control their activities. However, Damer Dawson, who had previously campaigned against animal vivisection, was more concerned with policing public morality, particularly that of working-class women. The government agreed and from its foundation onwards the WPV's role was delimited to enforcing the public decency laws and supervising female workers such as munitionettes. While this side of their work was generally approved, Boyle was to become alarmed that her organisation and other similar initiatives were being used to support anti-female propaganda and to curtail women's civil liberties. She also deplored the adoption of Regulation 40D, an anti-prostitution amendment to the Defence of the Realm Act, that in many people's view revived some of the objectionable features of the nineteenth-century Contagious Diseases Acts. She described Regulation 40D, which punished women for their sexual relations with members of the armed services, as 'besmirching' the good name of women.

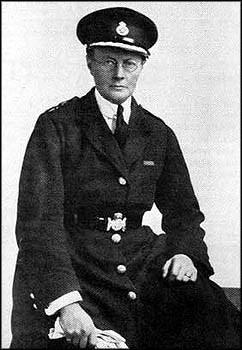
Damer Dawson in her WPS uniform, c.1917

In February 1915, Boyle and Damer Dawson disagreed over the use of the WPV to enforce a curfew on women of so-called 'loose character' near a service base in Grantham, which proved unacceptable to Boyle and her beliefs. Boyle also denounced the use of the Defence of the Realm Act by the authorities in Cardiff to impose a curfew on what were described as 'women of a certain class' between the hours of 7pm and 8am. In contrast, Damer Dawson took a more pragmatic line, with the support of most of the WPV's members. As a result of this dispute, Boyle asked for Dawson's resignation, but instead Dawson convened a meeting of 50 policewomen, all but two of whom agreed to follow Dawson's lead.

== Women's Police Service ==
In 1915, Dawson changed the name of WPV to the Women Police Service, took on Mary Sophia Allen as her second-in-command, and ended all links with the WFL.

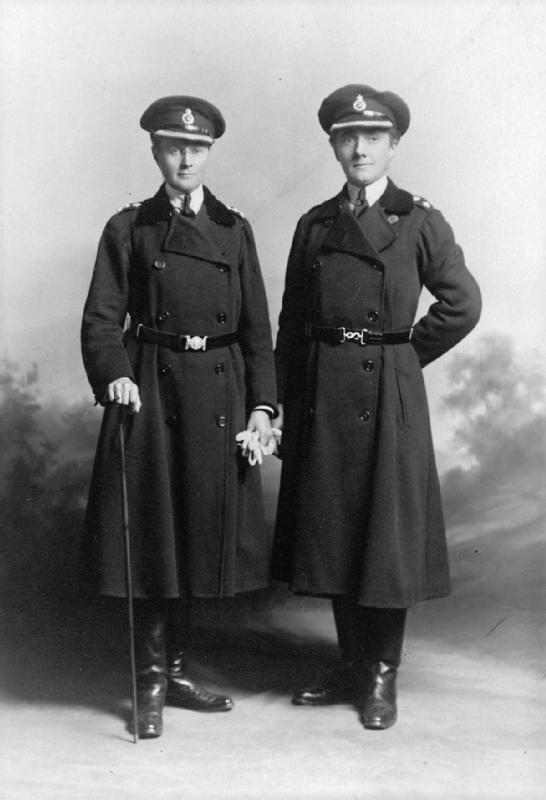
Dawson (left) and Allen in their WPS uniforms.

While an organisation known as the WPV continued to patrol on its own terms in Brighton and part of London until 1916, Dawson's new service enjoyed much greater success. Its members searched women employed at Ministry of Munitions factories. In August 1915 in Grantham, Edith Smith of the WPS was appointed the first woman police constable in England with full power of arrest. The WPS's benevolent service also founded a babies' home in Kent, which after Dawson's death was renamed the "Damer Dawson Memorial Home for Babies".

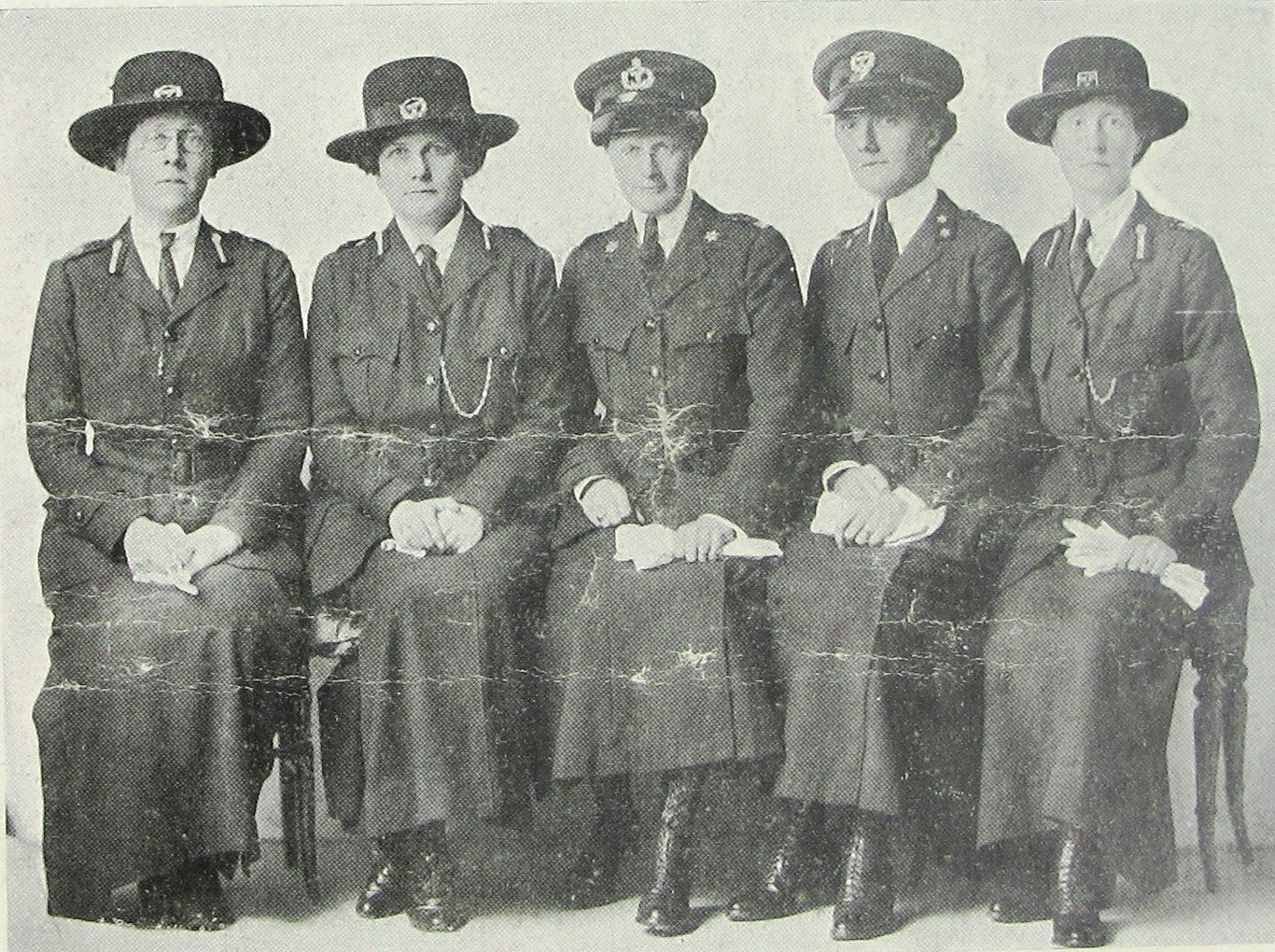
From left: D. MEESON COATES (Chief Inspector), Miss ST. JOHN PARTRIDGE, M. DAMER DAWON (Chief Officer) M. S. ALLEN (Chief Superintendent), B. GOLDINGHAM (Principal of Clerical Department)

== Interwar changes ==
As the first uniformed women's police services, the WPV and the WPS helped accustom the government and the British public to women exercising policing functions. By the end of WWI, there were 357 ‘lady policemen’ in London, as well as many others in English cities including Liverpool, Plymouth and Hull.

However, it was the members of a third organization – the Voluntary Women Patrols of the National Union of Women Workers – who would be drawn upon in 1918–1919 for the first members of Britain's first official women's police force, the Metropolitan Police Women Patrols. The first twenty-three women recruited for these Patrols were drawn exclusively from the NUWW's patrolwomen, as was their senior officer Sofia Stanley, though later intakes did include former WPS volunteers. Dawson requested to have all the WPS's volunteers made into official Met patrolwomen, but the Commissioner refused as he felt that it would cause friction because the women were too well educated. The Commissioner was also against employing women who had been militant suffragettes before the war, as some of the WPS, such as Mary Sophia Allen and Isobel Goldingham had been.

The WPS continued to exist after the introduction of women into police forces such as the Metropolitan Police in 1919, with Allen taking over command after Dawson's death in May 1920. This led to tensions which ultimately culminated in Allen and four other senior WPS patrolwomen being taken to court in March and April 1921 by the Metropolitan Police Commissioner for causing confusion by wearing a uniform too similar to that of the Metropolitan patrol women. This ended in a token fine, a renaming of the force to the Women's Auxiliary Service (WAS), an alteration to its cap badge and an addition of scarlet shoulder straps, all taking effect in mid-May that year.

WPS members had been sent to Ireland in 1920 during the Irish War of Independence to assist the Royal Irish Constabulary as "lady police searchers". Allen's focus became increasingly international – for instance, she represented the WAS on a visit to the British Army of the Rhine in 1923 to advise on the use of women police and led a research trip to see Stanisława Paleolog's women police in Poland. She also assigned it strike-breaking duties during the 1926 General Strike.

== Decline ==
When the Lord President of the Council Viscount Halifax set up the Women's Voluntary Services for Civil Defence in 1938, the WAS accepted a government invitation to be represented on the body's Advisory Council. Allen fulfilled this role until January 1940, when she stopped attending its meetings. When asked in the House of Commons on 12 June 1940 if the government would close down WAS, Osbert Peake, Under-Secretary at the Home Office, stated, "It is extremely doubtful whether this so-called organisation has any corporate existence at the present time".

From the 1940s onwards the phrase 'Women's Auxiliary Services' was used as a catch-all term for the Women's Auxiliary Air Force, Auxiliary Territorial Service, Women's Land Army, nurses and other women in the armed services, rather than for Allen's organisation.

== Bibliography ==
- Mary S. Allen, The Pioneer Policewoman, Chatto & Windus. London, 1925
- R.M. Douglas, Feminist Freikorps: The British Voluntary Women police, 1914–1940. Praeger Publishers, Westport. 1999
- Louise A. Jackson, Women Police. Gender, Welfare, and Surveillance in the Twentieth Century, Manchester University Press, 2006
- Phillipa Levine, '"Walking the Streets in a Way No Decent Woman Should": Women Police in World War I.', The Journal of Modern History 1994; 66(1):34–78
- Joan Lock, The British Policewoman. Her Story (Robert Hale, 1979).
