= St Andrew and St Mary's Church, Stoke Rochford =

St Andrew and Mary’s Church, Stoke Rochford
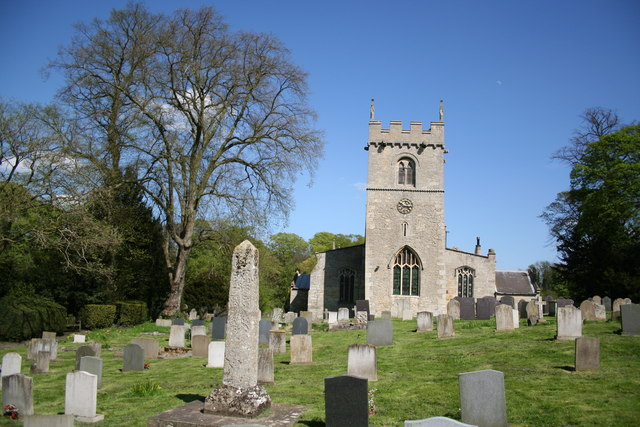
- St Andrew and St Mary's church, Stoke Rochford
- St Andrew and Mary’s Church, Stoke Rochford
- 52.835803°N 0.63498205°W
- OS grid reference: SK 92052 27351
- Country: England
- Denomination: Church of England
- Previous denomination: Roman Catholic

History
- Founded: 11th century
- Dedication: Saint Andrew; Saint Mary

Architecture
- Heritage designation: Grade I
- Designated: 20 September 1966
- Architectural type: Norman; Perpendicular

Specifications
- Materials: Ashlar and limestone rubble

Administration
- Province: Canterbury
- Diocese: Diocese of Lincoln
- Deanery: Deanery of Beltisloe
- Parish: Stoke Rochford with Easton

St Andrew and St Mary's Church is a Grade I listed Church of England parish church dedicated to Saint Andrew and Saint Mary, in the parish of Easton and the village of Stoke Rochford, Lincolnshire, England. The church is 5 miles (8 km) south from Grantham, and at the western side of the Lincolnshire Vales in South Kesteven.

St Andrew and St Mary's is significant for its association with, and memorials to, the Easton Hall Cholmeley and the Stoke Rochford Hall Turnor families.

The church is in the ecclesiastical parish of Stoke Rochford with Easton, and is part of the Colsterworth Group of Parishes in the Deanery of Loveden and the Diocese of Lincoln. Other churches in the same group are St John the Baptist's, Colsterworth; St James’, Skillington; Holy Cross, Great Ponton; and St Cuthlac's, Little Ponton. St Andrew and St Mary's is within the Stoke Rochford conservation area.

== History ==
St Andrew and St Mary's parish register dates from 1663.

Domesday 1086 settlements associated with the present church and parish included Stoke, North Stoke and Ganthorpe (Ganthrop) in the Winnibriggs, and Easton in the Beltisloe Hundred. At the time the settlements were described with no priest or complete church. However, from physical dating evidence South Stoke church might have an 11th-century origin. By the late 12th century the church of St Andrew at North, and St Mary at South Stoke existed in records. At some point the deserted medieval village of Ganthorpe with its chapel was at the north of what became the Stoke Rochford Estate, the Hall itself sitting further south between the townships of North Stoke at its north, and South Stoke at its south. North Stoke was demolished in 1841–1843 during the rebuilding of the previous 1794 Stoke Rochford Hall and its Estate's further enclosure, redesign and expansion.

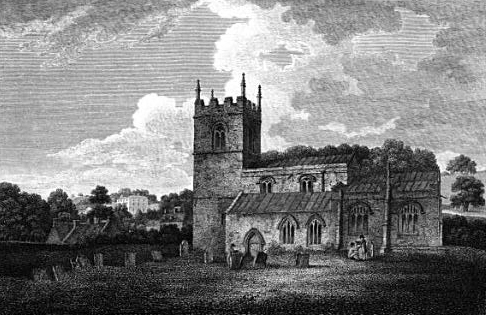
South Stoke Church c. 1806, showing previous 1794 Stoke Rochford Hall in background

Until 13 June 1776 the living for North and South Stoke had been held as a mediety—tithe, glebe, rent and profit income shared equally between the two churches—after which the living and incumbency was combined as one parish, and included the hamlet of Easton to the south, to become the ecclesiastical parish of South Stoke cum Easton, under the patronage of Salisbury Cathedral’s Prebendary of South Grantham. The St Andrew dedication of North Stoke church was added to South Stoke, its church becoming St Andrew and St Mary (sometimes St Mary and St Andrew). Some transferred elements from the North Stoke and Ganthorpe churches are incorporated. The previous mediety parsonage at North Stoke had burnt down in 1697, and an 1824 map of North Stoke did not indicate a church. The possible site of North Stoke St Andrew's was excavated in 1968, which revealed 11th- to 14th-century pottery, with further 16th- to 17th-century and Saxo-Norman pottery nearby. In the early 20th century parts of an 11th-century limestone cross with interlace patterns were found in St Andrew's Church ruins; the remains are now in the churchyard of St Andrew and St Mary's.

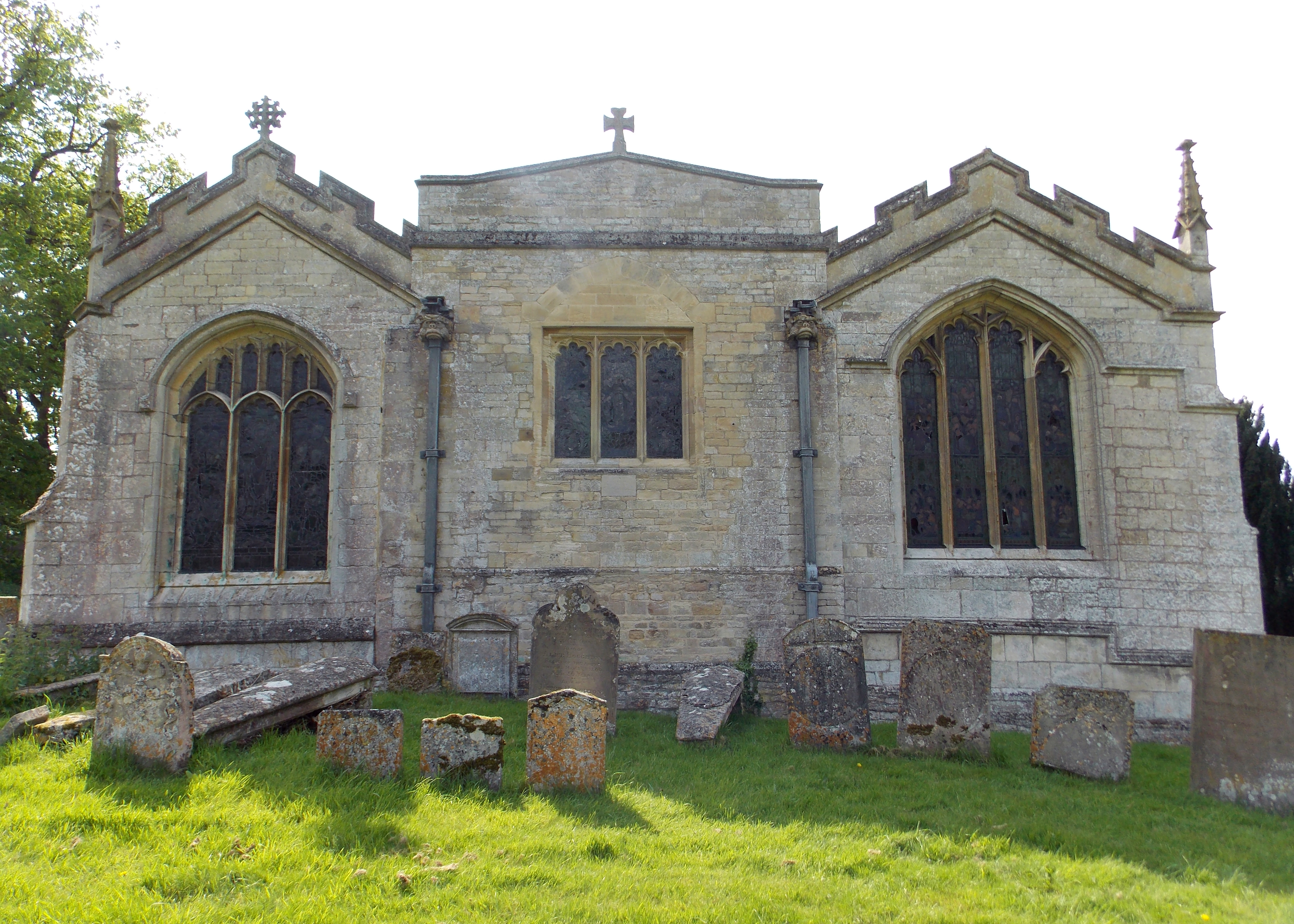
Chancel and 15th-century south and north chancel chapels from the east

The oldest parts of the church are the nave, essentially Norman, and a west tower hood mould which could be 11th-century (Pevsner). Chancel chapels were added in the 15th century: the south in 1448 by Ralph Rochford, and the north in 1460–70 by Henry Rochford, brother of Ralph. The Rochfords, who came to England under the Norman Conquest, took their name from the town of Rochford in Essex, and gave their name to the Stoke-Rochford manor and parish. Rochford family members include a soldier in Edward III’s French wars who was charged with the safety of John II of France during his captivity at Somerton Castle, Lincolnshire, a commissioner of Lincolnshire banks and sewers (fenland drainage), one given authority by Richard II to oversee horse and cattle selling in Holland and Kesteven, and between 1344 and 1409, six becoming High Sheriffs of Lincolnshire. Sir Ralph Rochford, who provided for the building of South Stoke St Mary's south chapel, was granted at Stoke free warren—hunting privilege from the King in 1448 on condition of preventing exploitation by others—a position previously held by John de Neville of Ganthorpe during the reign of Edward II. A sculptured high relief slab, possibly of John de Neville and his wife, was found in a field at Ganthorpe now lies in the north chapel, having been installed in the 19th century. Henry Rochford who added St Mary's north chapel, and who in 1427 had received lands, house and buildings at North and South Stoke, was the last with Stoke's Rochford family name. He married Elizabeth Scrope (d.1503). She was the daughter of Henry Scrope, 4th Baron Scrope of Bolton who owned the neighbouring manor of Easton, and the widow of Sir John Bigod of Mulgrave Castle, Yorkshire who was killed at the Battle of Towton during the Wars of the Roses. Upon the death of Henry Rochford, Elizabeth married Oliver St John (d.1497), elder half-brother of Margaret Beaufort who was mother of Henry VII. The bodies of Oliver St John and Elizabeth are buried beneath a black marble slab with brass inscriptions in the South Stoke church chancel. The South Stoke manor passed to Joan, the daughter of Henry Rochford, and through marriage and purchase to Stanhope, Skeffington, Ellys, Fountain, Heale and Harrison families. In 1637 Sir John Harrison passed by moiety the manor to his daughter Margaret (1627–1679), who married Edmund Turnor Esqu (1619–1707). Edmund Turnor was knighted in 1663 as a reward for his loyalty to Charles I.

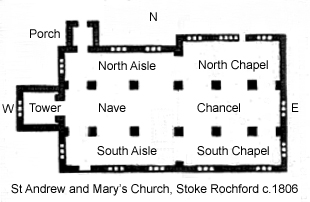

The north chapel and north aisle have since been used to commemorate the Turnor family of Stoke Rochford Hall to the north. The south chapel and south aisle have become associated with the Cholmely family of Easton Hall to the south. The Knight's Scrope attained the Easton manor through marriage from the Tybetost family who had been Lords of the manor in the 13th and 14th centuries. Lord Scrope conveyed the manor to Gilbert Bury in 1593, with James Bury selling it to Sir Henry Cholmely in 1606.

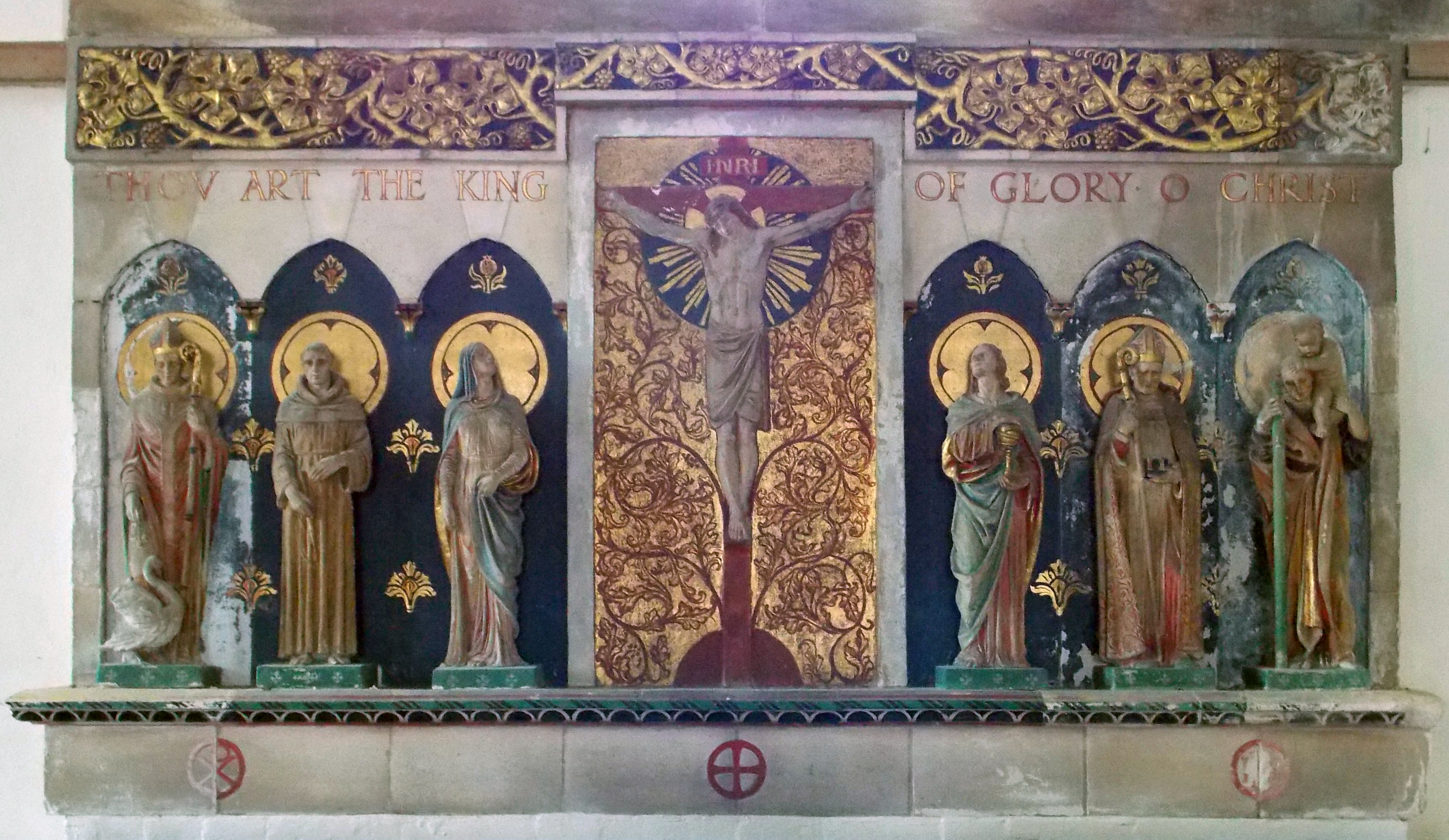
Reredos by Mary Fraser Tytler

In 1816 antiquarian and publisher William Marrat stated that the church was almost devoid of the stained glass imagery that, according to a report, "abounded" in 1640.

St Andrew and St Mary's was restored during the first half of the 19th century at a cost of £2,000, provided by the Turnors, Cholmelys and others. An 1846 restoration added a lower chancel roof, and a lath and plaster chancel arch which was removed by a further restoration in 1936, revealing the down face of the chancel roof below the chancel arch apex. A further tower restoration took place in 1946. The chancel reredos was added in 1911, designed by Mary Fraser Tytler, the wife of George Frederic Watts.

The tower external clock was erected in 1920 as a First World War memorial. The Second World War Operation Market Garden was planned at Stoke Rochford Hall. A commemoration of the role played by 2nd Battalion, Parachute Regiment in the military operation has been held at the church each year, attended by Battalion members. A memorial service was held at the church in 2006 in remembrance of the Royal Canadian Air Force and RAF crew of a Lancaster bomber which crashed in the grounds of Stoke Rochford Hall on 28 April 1945.

In 2012 Emily McCorquodale, the daughter of Lady Sarah McCorquodale and niece of the late Princess of Wales, married director James Hutt at St Andrews and St Mary's. Attending the ceremony were the Duke and Duchess of Cambridge, Prince Harry and Earl Spencer.

St Andrew and St Mary received from English Heritage a Grade I listed building status on 20 September 1966.

== Architecture ==
St Andrew and St Mary's is of ashlar and limestone rubble construction. It comprises a chancel with north and south side-chapels, a nave, north and south aisles, a west tower, a north porch, and a south vestry, and is of Norman and Perpendicular period and style, with elements of Decorated and Early English.

=== Exterior ===
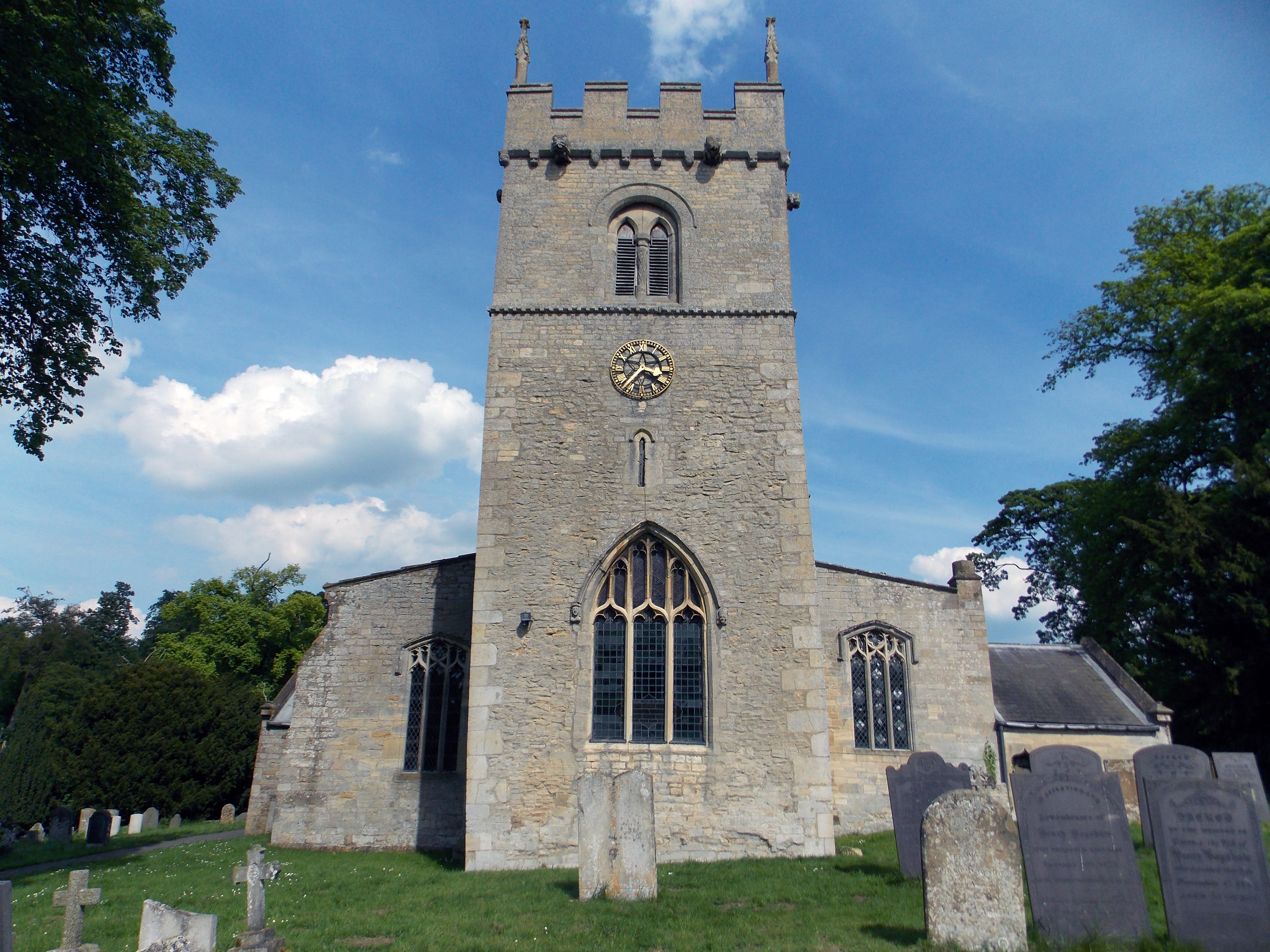
Tower from the west

The tower is of three stages. The lower stages might be part of an 11th-century previously unbuttressed tower, and contains at its west side an early 15th-century chamfered reveal window opening with pointed arch surrounded by a hood mould with label stops in human form. The inset Perpendicular window is of three lights of panel tracery below, and six above. The panels are headed with trefoils, the lower within ogee heads. A church clock is just below the belfry stage. Between the window and clock is a hooded slit window, a repeat slit window is on the north and south sides. The Belfry stage was added in the 13th century and is defined at its base by a string course with repeating dentils. Central to each side of the belfry stage is a chamfered window opening with a plain hood mould following a semi-circular head. Within the opening are louvered and pointed twin-lights, these separated by a central octagonal shaft with a trefoil opening above in the north and south windows. The roof line is defined by a further string course with repeated grotesque bosses, and pairs of gargoyle drains on each side. An embattled roof parapet with crocketed corner pinnacles sits above. The tower is partially clasped at the north and south by the church aisles, and on the north side by an ashlar three-stepped angled buttress against the lower stages.

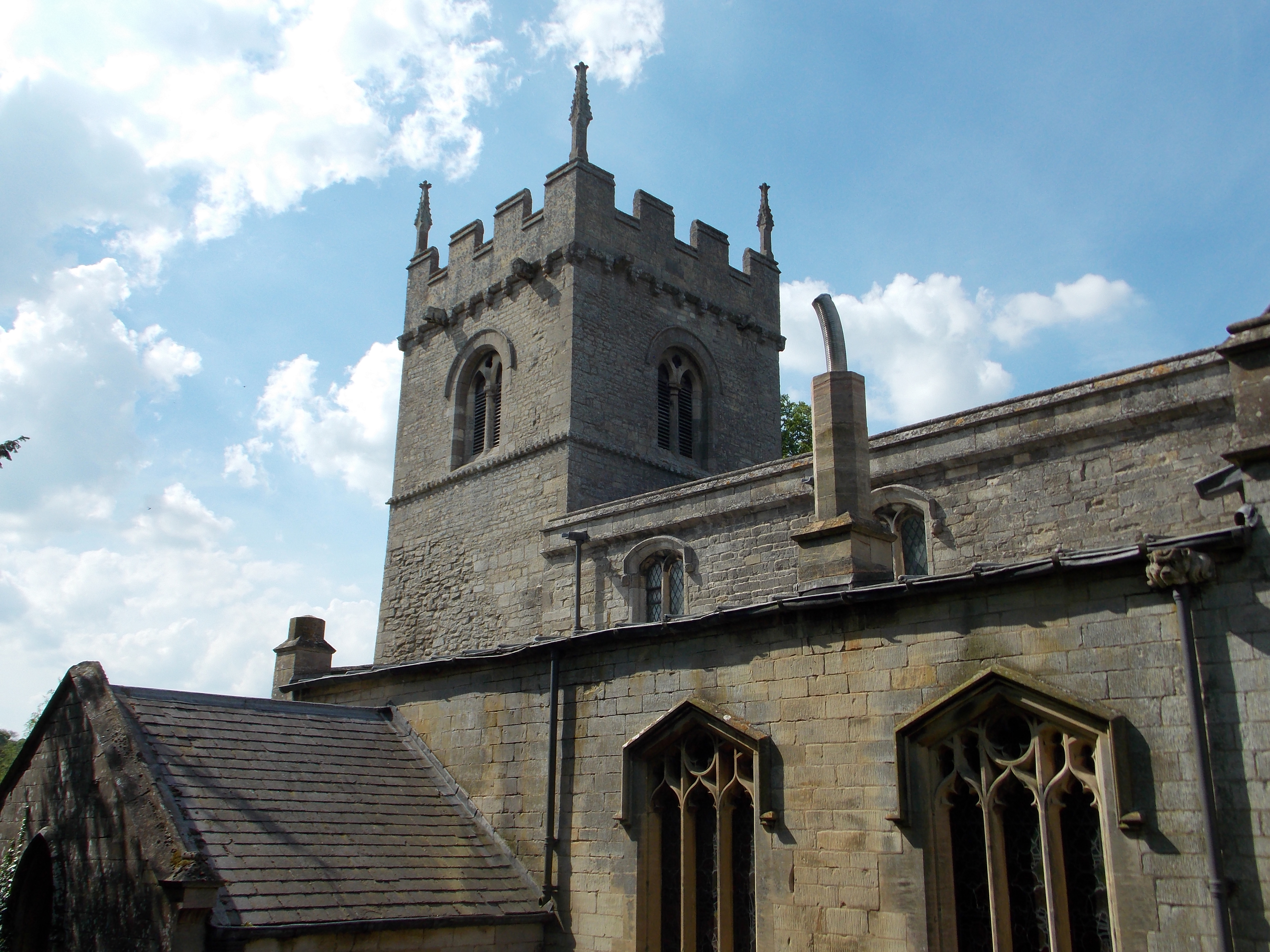
Clerestory and tower above the south aisle and vestry

The nave is defined by the clerestory above the abutted north and south aisle roofs. The clerestory contains three clear glazed windows on the north wall and three on the south, each of twin-lights surrounded by shallow-top arches within deep hood moulds. The windows at the south are point-headed and of plain tracery, those at the north round-headed with cinquefoil cusping—lobes formed by the overlapping of five circles. The clerestory parapet is of plain stone construction, overhangs the wall, and has a coped top.

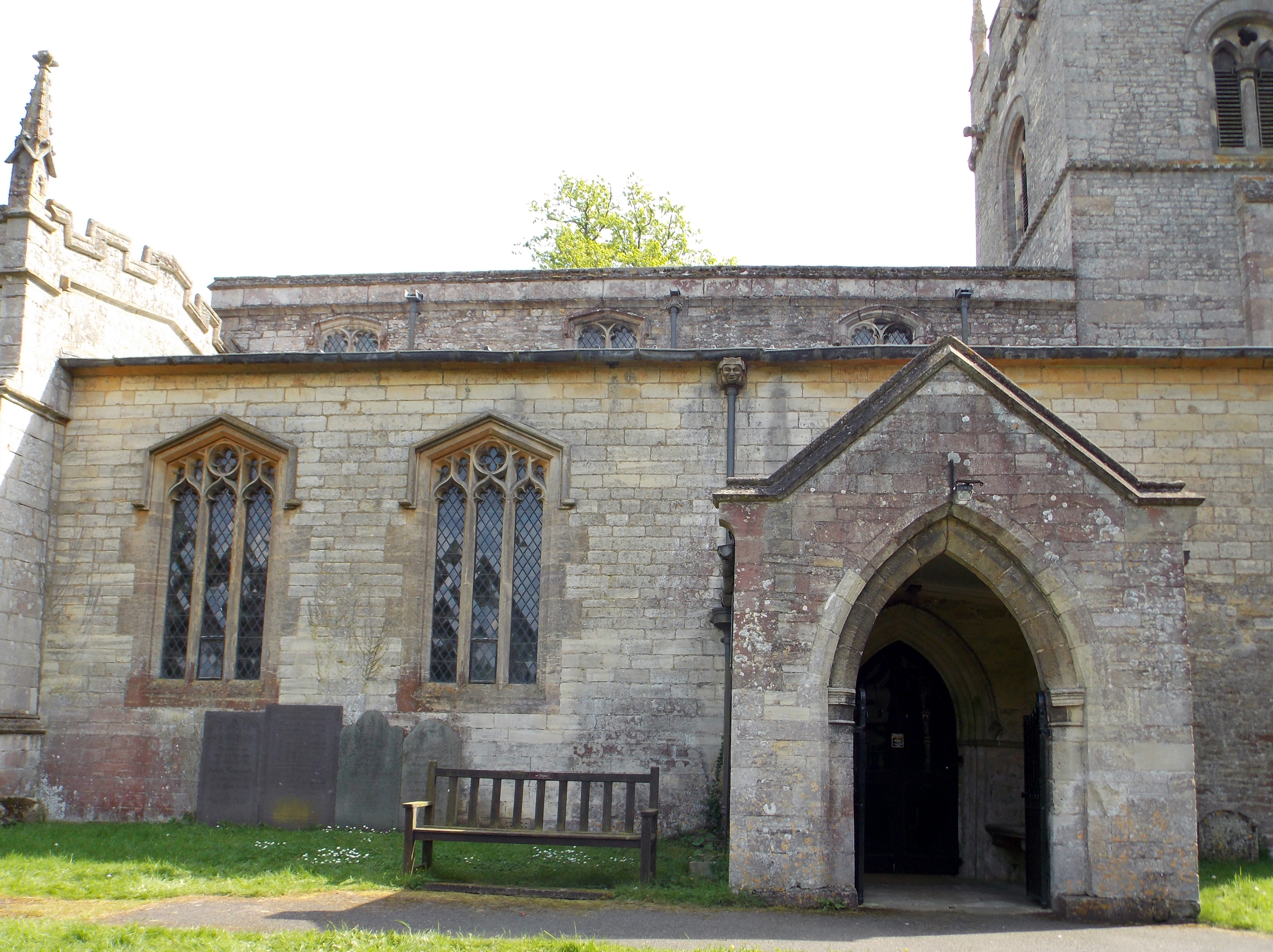
North aisle and porch

Attached to the nave are the north and south aisles. The north aisle contains at its east two 19th-century windows of three lights set within a straight edge openings under gabled hood moulds. Tracery is of 15th-century panel style, with a central quatrefoil rosette inset, and reflects a true 15th-century window at the west wall. North aisle windows are clear glazed within diagonal muntins. A single step angled buttress supports the aisle north-east corner. To the west of the aisle north windows and above the east of the porch is the aisle roof's single gargoyle-headed drain. The gabled porch at the west of the windows is 13th-century, its doorway with a pointed chamfered arch from the spring of part octagonal responds—half-piers attached to walls supporting an arch—with octagonal capitals. Attached to the responds to the height of the capitals is a cast iron double-gate. The porch interior contains a stone bench each side, and an inner doorway with 14th-century three-mould arch and hood mould with label stops. The panelled porch door has metal-studded deep stiles and rails, the panels with intermediate and arch-headed mullions.

The south aisle south and west windows reflect completely the style and date of those in the north aisle. Attached to the south aisle, and opposite the porch on the north, is a 19th-century gabled vestry—not evident in an 1806 plan—partly set behind a wall and iron fence enclosure. The vestry window at the south is of a single light with panes of glear glazing set in square muntins, within a double chamfered arched surround with hood mould. At the west side of the vestry is a plank door within an ogee-headed moulded doorway.

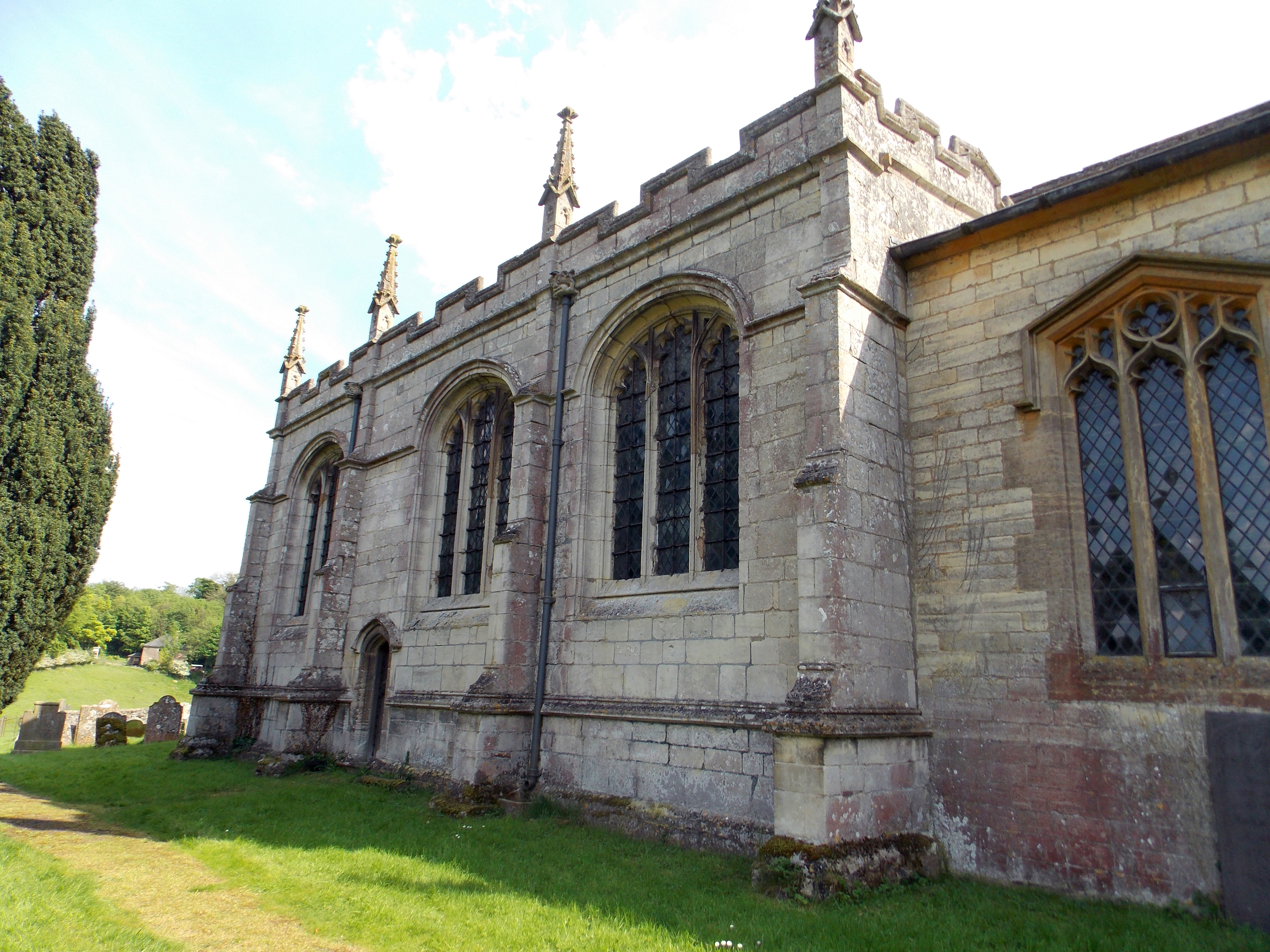
North chapel from north-west

The 1448 south chapel sits on a moulded plinth which runs over two twin-stepped buttresses, one angled and central to the south wall, the other diagonal on the south-east corner. The buttresses are topped by square-based pinnacles with blind cusped panels, crocketed above gables at each side, the pinnacle at the south-east finished with a finial. The parapet is embattled with moulded coping, which runs as a gable end at the east end and includes a central cross above. At the roof line at the base of the parapet and the buttress tops runs a moulded cill band—angled projection that allows water to flow from a building face—which continues around the east side and follows the line of the gable end. Either side of the south wall buttress is a three light window with cinquefoil heads, with six panels above with trefoil heads, enclosed in a moulded surround, and set with stained glass. The window opening has a flattened arch above the spring with a following hood mould. The 1460–70 north chapel also sits on a moulded plinth. Its angle buttresses are similar style to the south chapel, including cill band, although four in number on the north wall defining three external bays with three windows. These and the chapel east window are all of three lights with simple 'Y' tracery and cinquefoil heads.

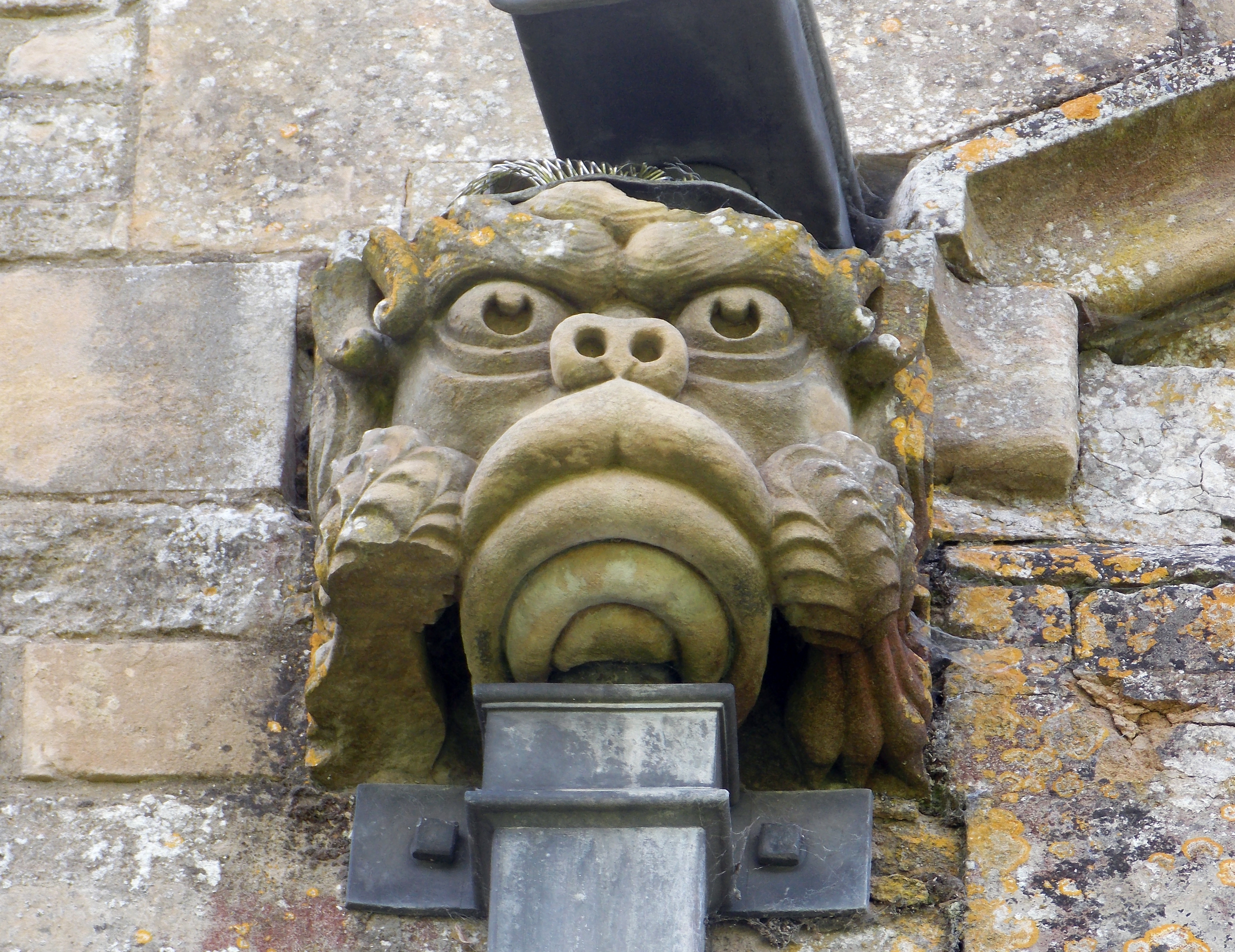
East wall gargoyle

The window hood moulds are similar to the south chapel but run into a further cill band around the north and east wall. Within the central bay of the north wall is a chapel doorway opening that breaks through the plinth. The opening is a twin-mould recess, with arch above surrounded by a hood mould. The door planking is set behind raised and studded rails and stiles with inset moulded blind lights. The chancel east wall between the chapels is plain except for a simple cill band above the roof line, and a shallow coped gable with a central cross above. The chancel east window is of three lights with cinquefoil heads set in a moulded frame. Pevsner states that the window "makes an odd east view with the chancel east window, smaller, recent, and straight-headed, between." Two spouts, dressed with gargoyle heads, drain the roof between the chancel and the chapels.

=== Interior ===
The interior dimensions of the church give the nave and side aisles at 42 feet (13 m), and the chancel and chancel chapels at 38 feet (11.6 m) long. Both the nave and chancel are 18 feet (5.5 m) wide. The north chancel chapel is 16 feet (5 m) wide and the north aisle, 12.5 feet (3.8 m). Both the south chancel chapel and south aisle are 12 feet (3.7 m) wide. Pevsner describes the interior as "sadly scraped"—scraping a typical 19th-century restoration method of cleaning and retooling.

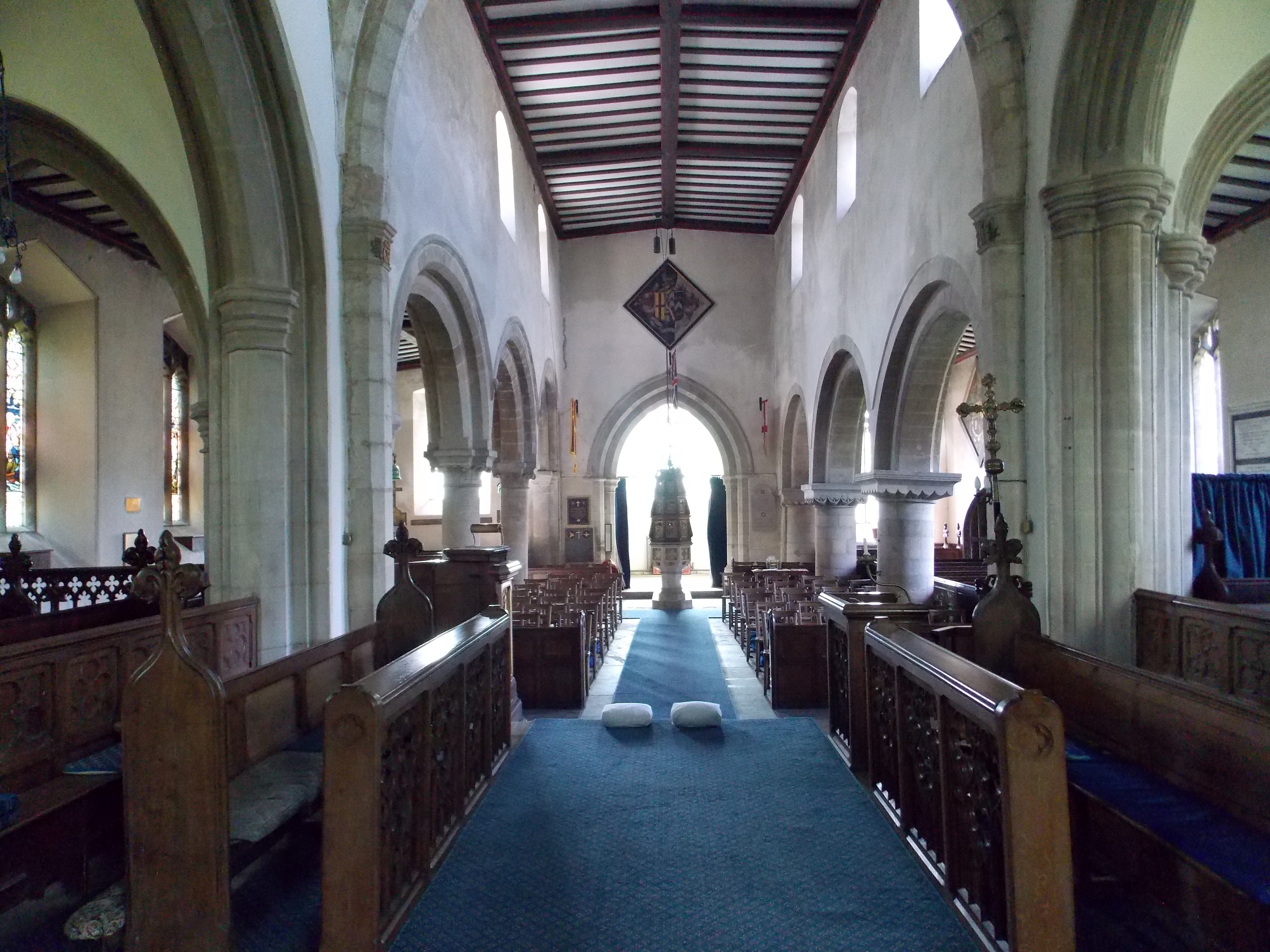
Nave from the chancel

The 13th-century double-chamfered pointed tower arch is supported by twin octagonal responds. Sitting at the base of the tower arch is a 19th-century octagonal stone font. The bowl is panelled on each side with inset fields containing cusped and quatrefoil mouldings, floriate details at its base, all partly painted. A painted rim imitating cable moulding runs around the font rim and moulding on the plinth. On the font is a c. 1900 painted font cover by Christopher Turnor to the design of staircase panels at Stoke Rochford Hall. The font cover panel paintings, depicting the childhood of Christ, are by Jessie Bayes, who also painted the image "Our Lord in Glory" on the down face of the lowered chancel ceiling.

The nave north arcade is Norman and might date from before 1150 and be part of the earlier structure which also contained the west tower. It is of three bays defined by circular piers topped by square abaci with scalloped cushion capitals, supporting chamfered semi-circular arches. The nave south arcade is early 13th century and Perpendicular. The piers supporting the semi-circular arches are narrower than those at the north, the arches having deeper chamfered reveals. The capitals are frustum-style of four facets, with abaci of floriate detailing reminiscent of crocketing, except that on the pier respond at the west carved as flat leaf. In both aisles either side of the nave are rows of pews, provided by Sir Edmund Turnor in 1700. Within the south aisle are two stained glass windows. The chamfered chancel arch sits on polygonal responds with part octagonal capitals in which are embossed and painted cyphers of King George VI between lily floral motifs on one, and rose on the other.

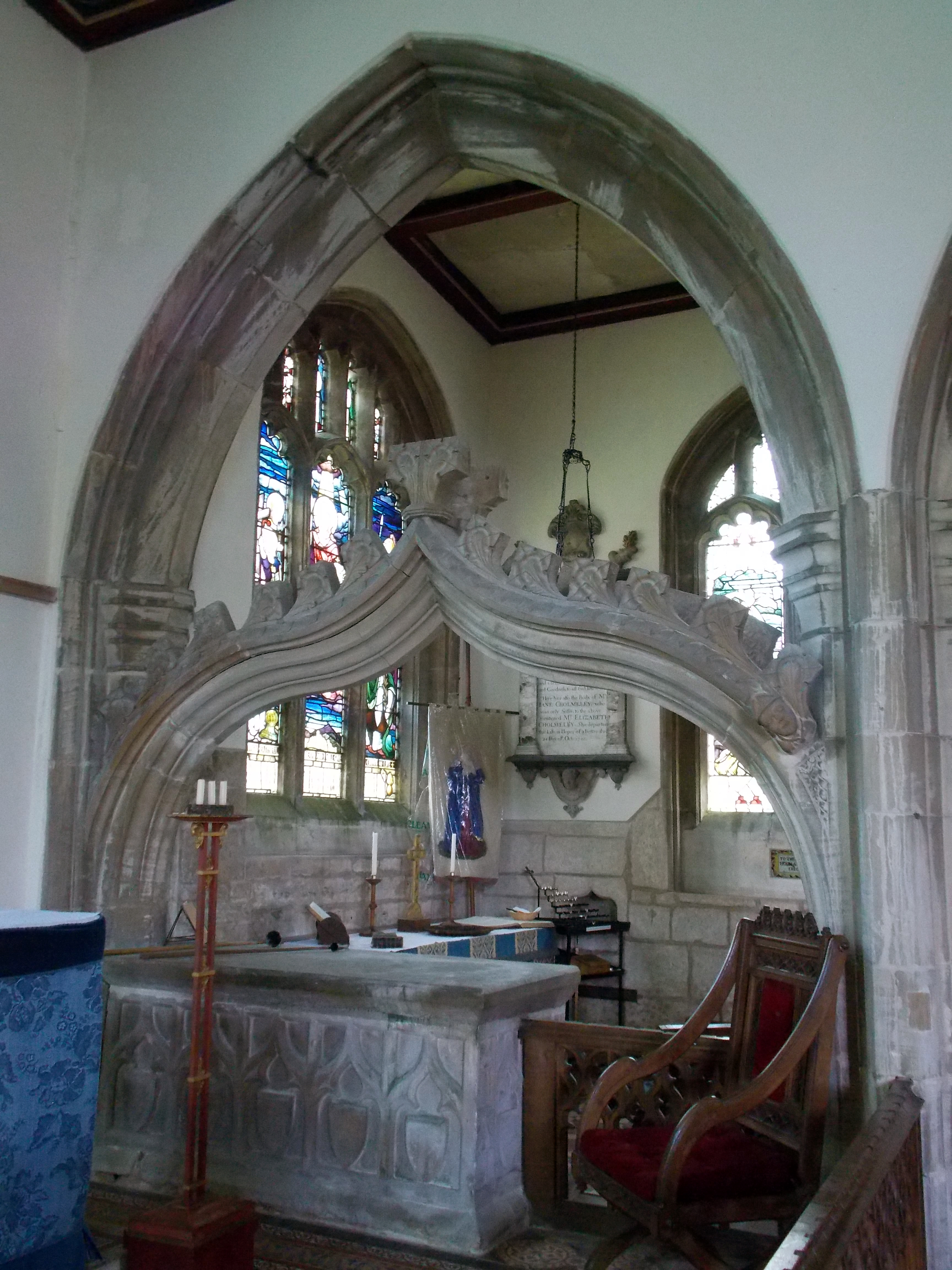
East arcade between the chancel and south chapel

The nave arcades run through to corresponding chancel arcades separating the north and south chancel chapels from the chancel. The chancel three-bay north arcade is 14th-century Decorative, with piers quatrefoil in section separated by right-angled projections running full length, and with flat raised fillets along each face. The capital gadrooned (convex and concave) raised acabi mouldings follow the lateral line of the cusped piers. The 15th-century arcade arches springing from the piers are also of a continuous Decorative multi-faceted moulding with a flat under-face. The chancel south arcade is 15th-century. Its piers are Perpendicular, with polygonal piers and capitals and chamfered arches. The furthest east south arcade contains within it a supplementary Decorative arch springing from the piers, this of ogee form with multi-rounded moulding, topped with a twin run of decorative battlements leading to a flat topped finial; this arch was rebuilt in the 19th century. At each side within the westernmost chancel bays are 19th-century wooden choir stalls. Screens facing the stalls are of cusped ogee arches and quatrefoils in open fretwork moulding; the altar rail is of similar style. Behind the stalls are pews, originally belonging to the manor houses of Easton and Stoke Rochford. Between the aisles and chancel chapels at the north and south are 19th-century low wooden screens, with a run of seven double panels; plain below, those above with decorative insets, the central and outer of quatrefoils. Above the paneling runs open fretwork moulding of cusped ogee arches leading to quatrefoils between, below a top rail. Beneath the chancel east window is a 1911 stone reredos sculptured in relief, and painted, by Mrs. G. F. Watts. A raised central panel depicts the crucifixion of Christ with, at each side, three saints within triple-arched niches: the saints Hugh of Lincoln and Gilbert of Sempringham, and the Virgin Mary to the left; St John, Bishop King of Lincoln and St Christopher to the right. The base projection contains a scalloped bed-mould. A decorative frieze of serpentine foliage is set at the top. Above the reredos is the Perpendicular-style three-light east window with 19th-century stained glass.

The north chapel contains a parish chest of wood held with metal straps, in the east wall a piscina with moulded and pointed surround, and against the north wall the church organ. The south chapel piscina is ogee-headed.

== Memorials ==
The church monuments and memorials are divided almost exclusively between those of the Turnor family of Stoke Rochford in the north aisle and chapel, and the Chomeley family of Easton in the south aisle and chapel.

=== North chapel and north aisle ===
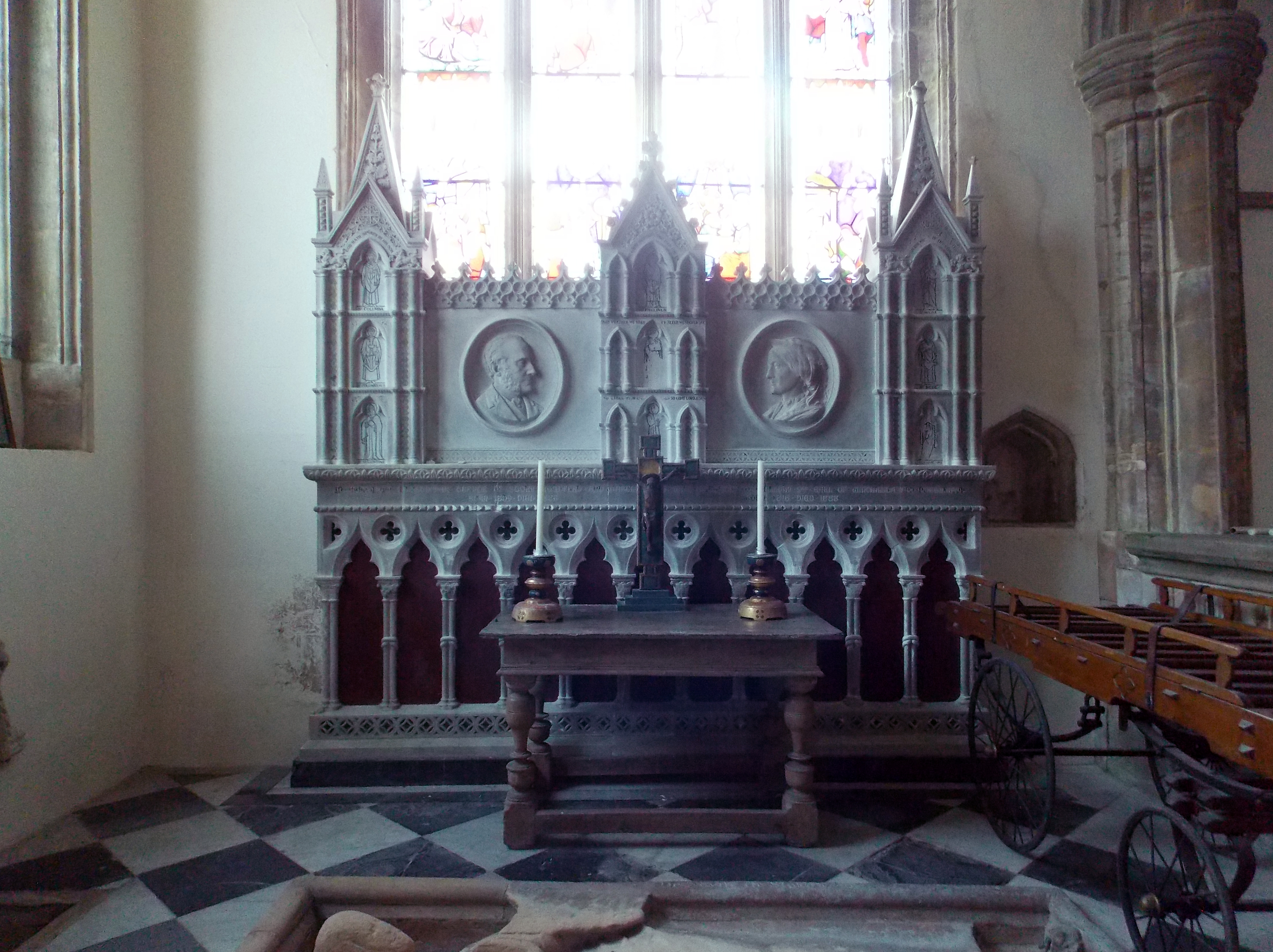
North chapel Turnor reredos memorial

Beneath the window on the east wall of the north chapel is an 1896 "fine memorial" sepulchral reredos to Christopher Turnor (1809–1886) and his wife Lady Caroline (Finch-Hatton), designed by Turnor himself. Christopher Turnor undertook the rebuilding of Stoke Rochford Hall in 1846, was an MP for South Lincolnshire, and was a designer and provider of Lincolnshire farm complexes. Lady Caroline was the daughter of George Finch-Hatton, 10th Earl of Winchilsea. The memorial is of white marble. The table pedestal is faced with twelve twinned column reliefs, leading to ogee headed and cusped arches, with quatrefoils in circular devices between each. Above are three decorative gabled and pinnacled relief structures supported by slender columns, with inset niches containing saints, inscriptions, and geometric and floriated details, separated by a crocketed frieze. Two panels between contain roundels with profile relief portraits within a circular moulding.

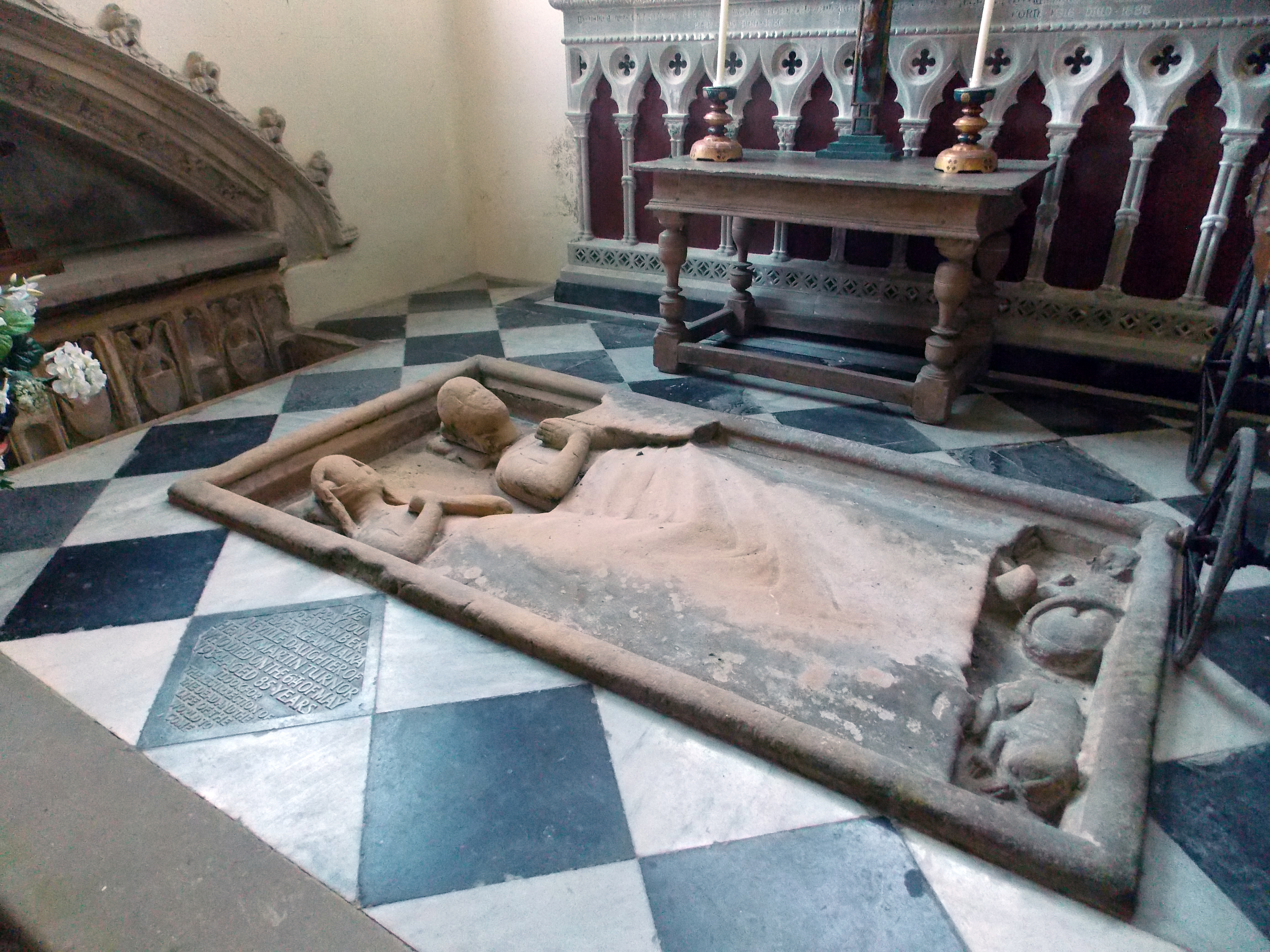
North chapel floor slab perhaps to John and Elizabeth de Neville

The Christopher Turnor monument sits on a black-and-white marble-tiled raised level. Within this level is set a worn sculpted medieval monument, supposed the early 14th-century memorial to John de Neville and his wife, with two recumbent figures—the man in chain armour, the woman with a wimple—draped from elbow to ankle and set within a sunken field. A dog lies at the feet of each figure, and a shield with three Fleur-de-lis lies partly over the man. Set into the raised floor against the north wall is a recessed table tomb with inset panels with angels holding shields, above which is a curved and moulded canopy arch with embedded fleuron repeats and a crocketed top running to a cross-shaped floriate finial. The origin of the monument is unknown. Next to the de Neville monument and set into a marble tile is a lozenge-shaped metal plaque to Florence Amy Laura Neville (died 1934 aged 85 years), daughter of Henry Martin Turnor who was the son of antiquarian Edmund Turnor (1755–1829) and brother of Christopher Turnor (1809–1886).

On the north wall of the north chapel is a white marble plaque set on a black relief background with curved top, dedicated to John Turnor of Stoke Rochford and Panton House, who died at Leamington Spa in 1845, aged 79 years, and to his sister, Frances Turnor, who died at Cheltenham in 1847, aged 83 years. Both were the children of a further Edmund Turnor (died 1806), and the siblings of Edmund Turnor (1755–1829). The memorial text is set within a recessed panel; a base moulding is supported by square brackets on an apron below, and a moulded cornice with plain pediment sits above.

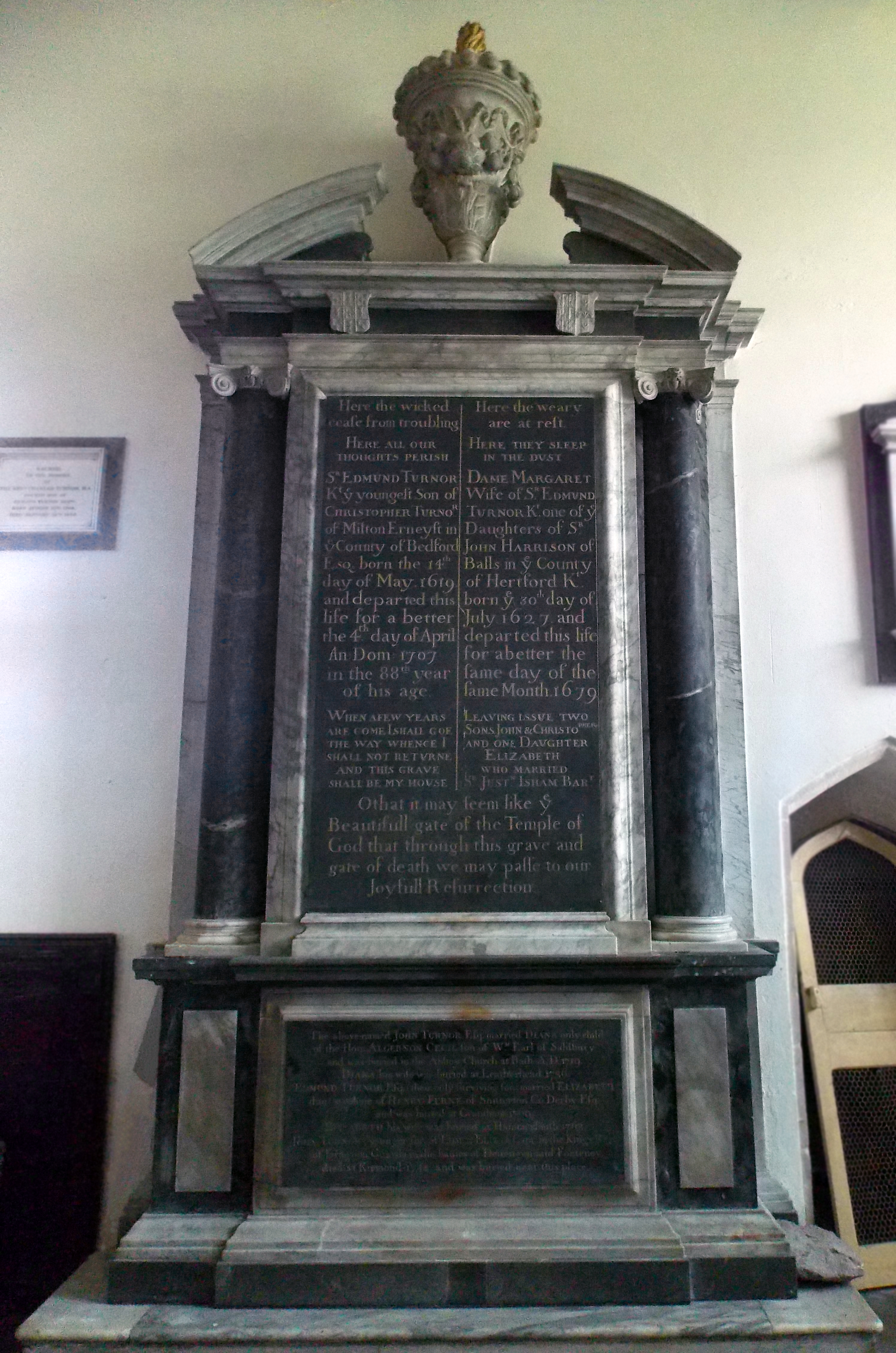
North chancel chapel monument to Edmund Turnor (1619–1707)

On the same wall, immediately to the west, is a 17 feet (5.2 m) tall by 8 feet (2.4 m) wide monument completely of figured black or white marble, erected by Edmund Turnor (1619–1707) during his lifetime. Sitting on a white stepped base, and attached to a white back plate which runs to the entablature, is a pedestal. The pedestal's central panel contains inscriptions within a white bolection mould. Set back on either side are inset white oblong raised panels—the top has a projected moulding following the plinth's horizontal facets. Above is an aedicule of inscriptions on a black field with wide white bolection mould surround, contained between a column each side of black shaft, and white base, stylobate and ionic capital, beneath the entablature. The entablature contains a white architrave with a plain black frieze above. From the front face of the cornice hangs two heraldic shields. The curved pediment is segmented, with the central open part containing a decorative urn. The inscriptions on the monument appear white, but were reported in 1806 as gilded. The upper panel inscription is to Sir Edmund Turnor—brother of Sir Christopher Turnor (1607–1675), Baron of the Exchequer in 1660—and his wife, Dame Margaret (1627–1679). Turnor, knighted in 1663, was the youngest son of Christopher Turnor (died 1619) of Milton Erneyst, and was the first Turnor to take possession of the Stoke Rochford estates through marriage settlement for Margaret, the daughter of Sir John Harrison of Balls Park, Hertfordshire and his wife, Margaret, of Fanshawe Gate Hall, Derbyshire. The pedestal inscription is to John Turnor, son to Sir Edmund and Dame Margaret. John Turnor was buried at Bath Abbey in 1719. He married Diana (buried 1736), the only child of Algernon Cecil, son to the Earl of Salisbury. John and Diana's only surviving son, Edmund, was buried at Grantham in 1763. Edmund had married Elizabeth, co-heir of Henry Ferne of Snitterton Hall, Derbyshire. Elizabeth was buried at Hammersmith in 1763. Also recorded is John (died 1752), the younger son of Edmund and Elizabeth, who was captain in the King's Regiment of Dragoon Guards in the battles of Detingen and Fonteny, and died at Kirmond, near where he was buried.

In the north aisle there are further Turnor plaques including one at the west end for Herbert Broke Turnor (1848–1881), son of Christopher and Lady Caroline Turnor, who died "In the Mountains of Thibet 75 miles from Ladak", erected by his brother Algernon. The plaque, on a black surround, is square white marble with an inset field with cut squares at each corner establishing a cross device. Each square is further cut with a cross inside a quatrefoil.

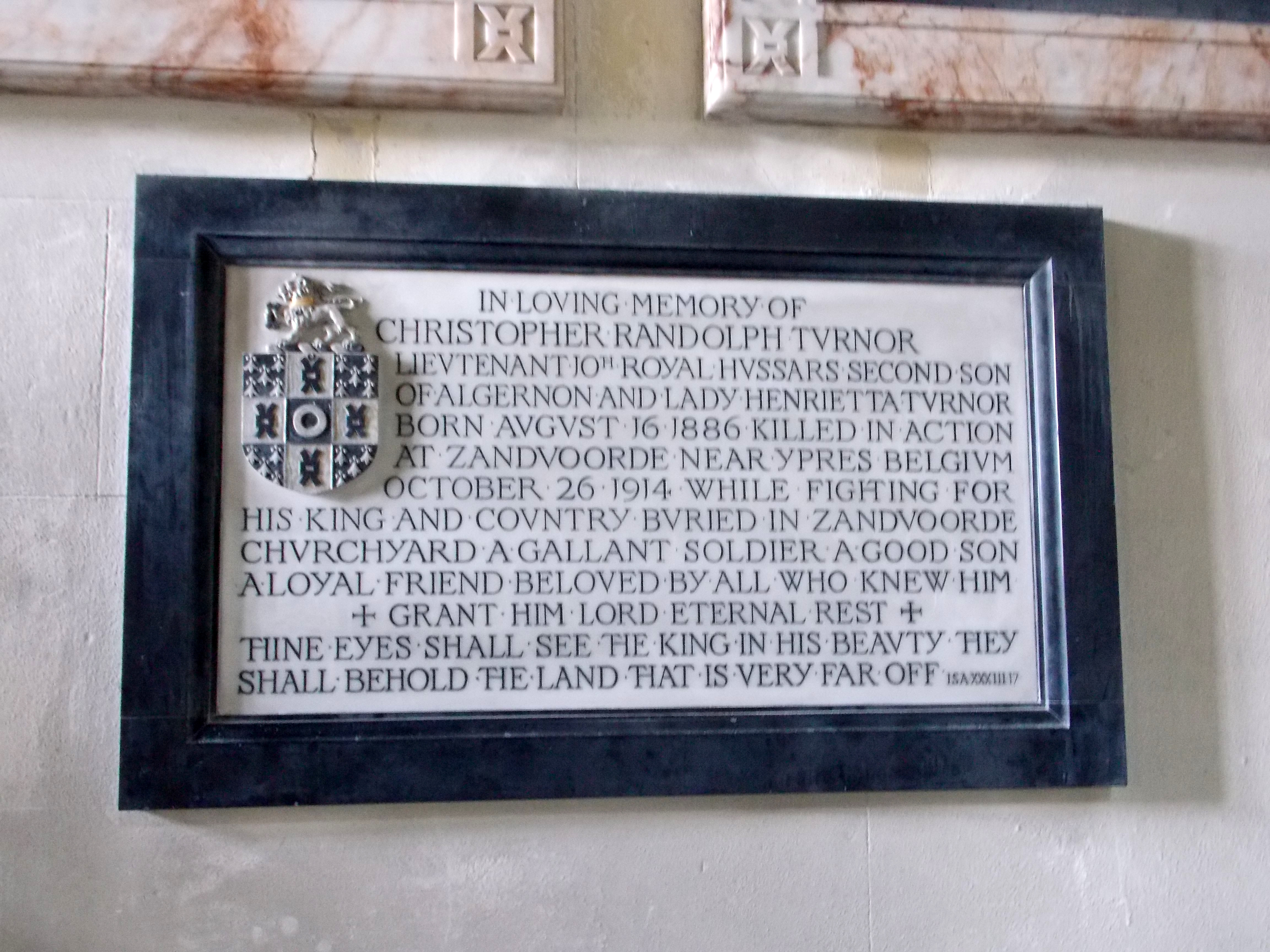
Plaque to Christopher Randolph Turnor

An oblong marble plaque of white field with black framing, and containing an embossed heraldic shield surmounted by a lion crest, is to Christopher Randolph Turnor (1886–1914), who was a lieutenant in the 10th Royal Hussars, killed near Ypres, Belgium, and buried in Zandvoorde; he was the son of Algernon and Lady Henrietta Turnor. Above this plaque are two others, both of a black recessed field, surrounded by a raised figured pink and white marble frame incised with flat straight grooves and square corner devices with embossed details. One is dedicated firstly to Elizabeth Turnor (died 1801 aged 27), first wife of Edmund Turnor (1755–1829), and daughter of Philip Bowes Broke (commander of HMS Shannon in the capture of USS Chesapeake); and secondly to Edmund Turnor's second wife Dorothea (died 1874 aged 77 years). The second is to Edmund Turnor (died 1806 aged 89 years)—who was the father of Edmund Turnor (1755–1829)—and his wife Mary (died 1818 aged 86 years). A further memorial of double dedication is of a white bolection moulding surrounding two raised plaques on a black field; all marble. Both dedications mention Reginald Charles Turnor (1850–1910); the first for his first wife Gabrielle (died 1898 at Cannes), the daughter to Marquis Sampieri, and whose ashes are held behind the memorial; the second for his death as a major of 1st Life Guards, and the husband of Laura Leticia Turnor. Below this double dedication is a plaque to Laura Letitia Turnor (1872–1952).

There are three funerary hatchments: two in the north aisle and one over the tower arch, according to English Heritage all 18th-century.

=== South chapel and south aisle ===
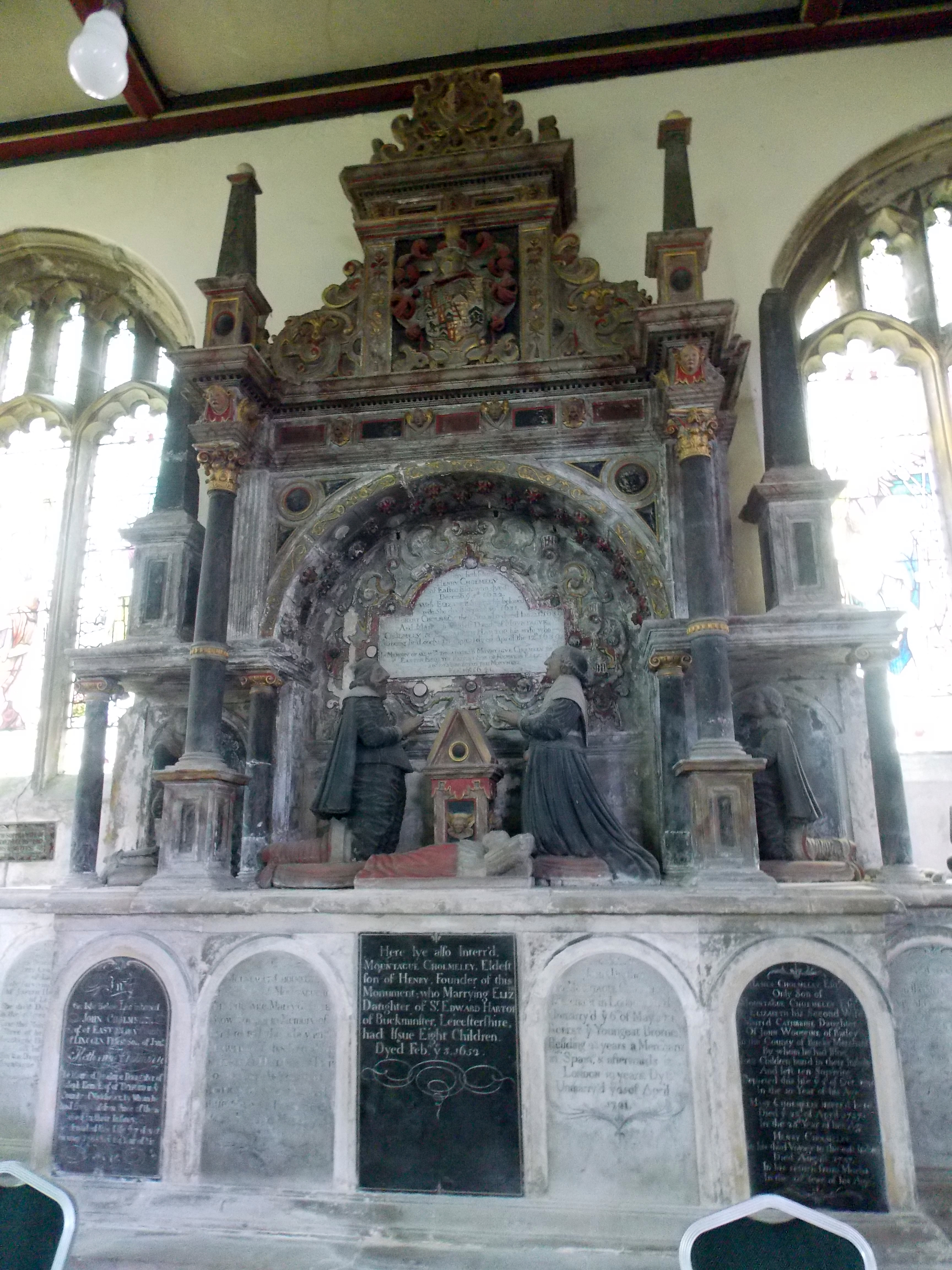
Monument to Henry and Elizabeth Cholmeley

The major monument at the south is that erected against the wall of the south chancel chapel by Montague Cholmeley in February 1641. The monument, free standing, is dedicated to Cholmeley's parents, Henry Cholmeley (died 1632), son to Sir Henry Cholmeley (died 1620) and Alice, the daughter of William Lacey of Stamford; and Elizabeth (died 1631), daughter to Sir Richard Sondes of Sheldwich, Kent. Sir Henry Cholmeley was the first of the family to take the manor of Easton, and was descended from the Cholmeley's of Cheshire. Montague Cholmeley's wife was Elizabeth, daughter to Sir Edward Hartop of Buckminster in Leicestershire.

The monument is described by Kelly's Directory as: "richly carved and gilt, and upon the base within arched recesses are kneeling effigies of the parents, and in smaller recesses effigies of two sons; intermediate columns support a cornice of panel work, enriched with armorial bearings and ornaments" The stone monument was originally completely painted and gilded. Henry and Elizabeth sit within an aedicule and kneel facing each other in prayer either side of a gabled ark, in front of which lies a covered small child with head on pillow. Columns flank the figures, beyond which kneels a further figure of a son each side, set in front of an arched recess under a portico of four columns, and slightly set back; plinths above the canopies are topped with plain square tapered black columns as pinnacles. The columns either side of Henry and Elizabeth are headed by Corinthian capitals that sit beneath an architrave, frieze and cornice that continue across the monument but set back. Below the set back frieze, and enclosing scrollwork and a memorial plaque, is a chamfered arch with a spandrel each side containing a roundel with embossed decoration. On the frieze run recessed oblong panels separated by relief heads. Above the cornice the line of the columns is continued by plinths, supporting tapered pinnacles topped by moulding and ball. Above the set back cornice is a complete heraldic achievement set within square columns decoratively embossed, and with scrollwork as support at the sides, and topped by a further architrave, frieze and cornice reflecting those below, above which is further scrollwork.

Other Cholmeley family members buried underneath the south aisle and chapel are commemorated by inscription on the monument:

- Robert, son of Henry Cholmeley and Elizabeth Sondes
- Mary, daughter of Montague Cholmeley and Elizabeth Hartop, who died in 1639 "having lived only 18 days"
- Penelope (died 1760 aged 45 years), wife of John Cholmeley and daughter to Joseph Herne of Twyford, Middlesex
- Penelope's (above) infant children: Montague, Henry, and Henry (two children survived: Montague and Penelope)
- John Cholmeley (died 1768 aged 64 years), husband of Penelope (above), eldest son to James and Catherine Cholmeley
- Montague Cholmeley (died 1700), the eldest son of Montague Cholmeley by his first wife, Alice Brownlowe; an adjoining monument was erected by Cholmeley to his second wife Elizabeth (died 1693), daughter of Richard Booth, Alderman of London.
- Montague Cholmeley (died 1652), founder of the monument to his father, husband to Elizabeth Hartop with issue of eight children
- John (died 1711), a London merchant who died unmarried and was the brother of Montague Cholmeley
- Robert (died 1721), a merchant 25 years in Cádiz, and 19 in London, and the youngest brother of Montague Cholmeley
- James (died 1735 aged 50 years), son of Montague Cholmeley and Elizabeth Hartop. He married Catherine Woodfine whose father, John, was a merchant at Ratley in Buckinghamshire. James and Catherine produced fourteen children; ten survived, four died in infancy.
- Catherine Cholmeley (died 1770 aged 89 years), widow of James Cholmeley
- Mary Cholmeley (died 1737 aged 23 years)
- Henry Cholmeley (died 1737 aged 20 years), died returning from Mocha during his third voyage to the East Indies
- Montague Cholmeley (died 1803 aged 60 years), the only son of John and Penelope Cholmeley. Montague married Sarah, daughter to Humphry Sibthorpe M. D. of Oxford, produced fourteen children, ten of whom survived

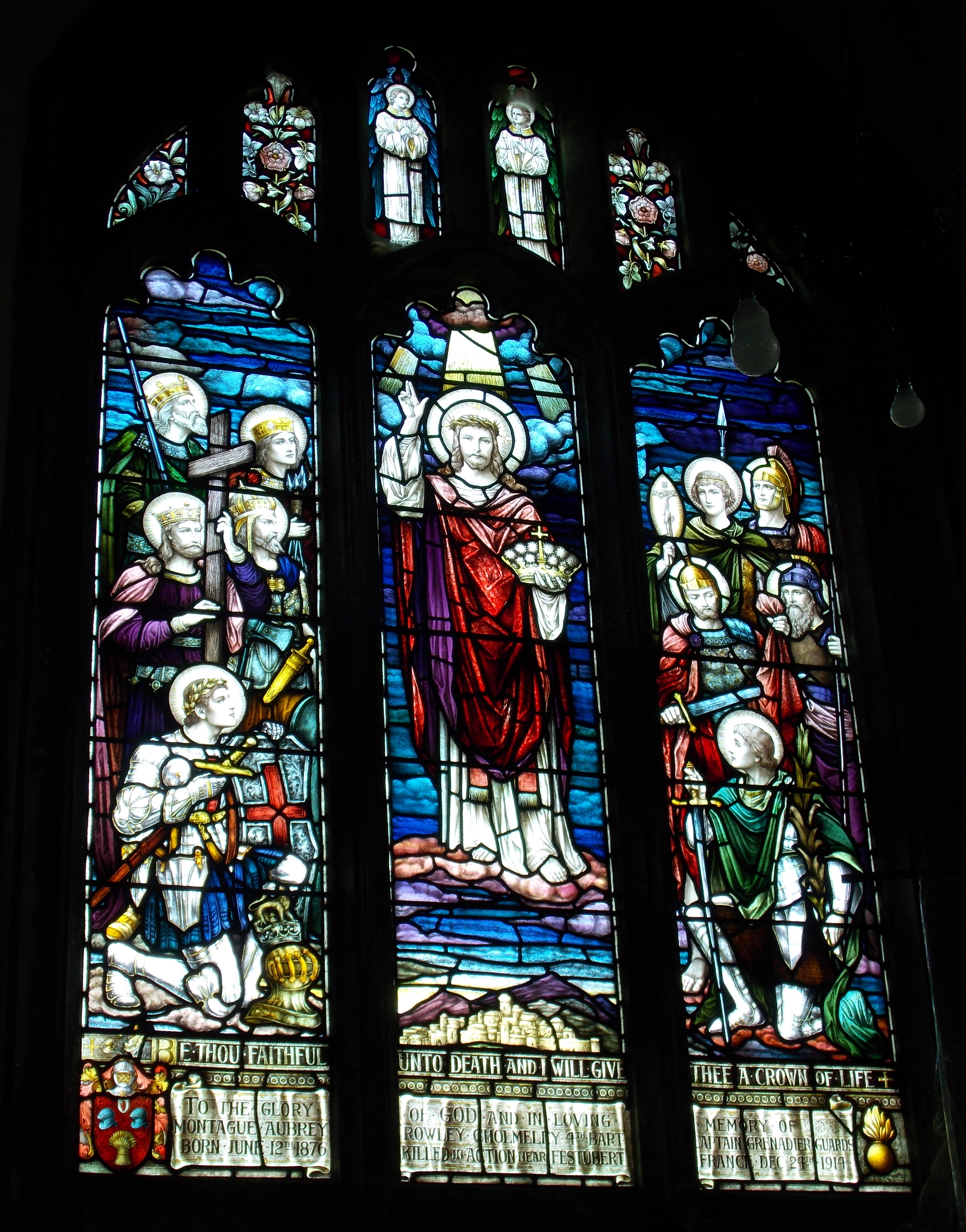
South chapel east window dedicated to Montague Aubrey Rowley Cholmeley

The south chapel east window is dedicated to Sir Montague Aubrey Rowley Cholmeley, 4th Baronet, (1876–1914), who, as a captain in the Grenadier Guards, was killed in action near Festubert during the First World War. Each side of the Edmund Chomeley monument is a stained glass window, the one to the west dedicated to Sir Hugh Arthur Henry Cholmeley (1839–1904), 3rd Baronet, and erected by his wife and children. A further stained glass window dedicated to Lady Cholmeley, widow of Hugh Arthur Henry Cholmeley, was erected in 1911. At the west of the south chancel chapel is a wall monument to Alice (died 1678 aged 24 years), the wife of Montague Cholmeley, and the daughter of Sir Richard Brownlow of Great Humby and sister of Sir John, and William Brownlow. Alice produced five children to Montague, three of whom—John, Alice and Mary—predeceased her. The monument is white marble, its plaque inscription within a field set below flat moulding with part inset quarter-circles at bottom left and right. The plaque is supported by scallop shell and scrolling with swagged and tied ribbon motifs each side. Above the plaque is a cornice, the top of which is a deep curved cushion moulding with raised scallops. Above the cornice is a heraldic shield vertically divided red and brown, with helm and crest above.

On the south aisle wall are three monuments all of white marble on black marble back plates. One is to Mrs Penelope Cholmeley (died 1821 aged 75 years), the sister of Montague Chomeley. Her remains were interred at Twyford, Middlesex. The monument back plate is straight sided with top and bottom curved and facetted. The raised inscription plaque is oblong with a 45° cut at each corner, over which is a moulded shelf, on which sits an urn with 'cloth' swagging attached and topped with a flambeau. Floriate devices are a boss each side of the urn, bell flower ribbons hanging from the shelf either side of the plaque, and an oval flower and leaf spray below. The second is a double dedication: firstly to Sir Montague Cholmeley (died 1851 aged 59 years); secondly to Dame Elizabeth, his wife (died 1822), daughter and co-heiress of John Harrison of Norton Place, north from Lincoln. This monument back plate is straight sided with top deeply curved and bottom partly curved. The raised inscription plaque is rectilinear, and sits on a square-edged stepped shelf supported by curved brackets with embossed acanthus decoration, with a device of two strapped palm leaves below. At each side of the plaque is a hanging folded drape attached to a moulded cornice. At each side of the cornice top is a conch shell which provides the holding point for a plain swag that springs from a knot above; between the swagging is a raised cross. The monument was provided by George Wilcox of Piccadilly. Above this monument is one smaller to James Harrison Cholmeley (1808–1854), of a scrolled plaque on a straight sided back plate with a pointed top; above the scroll sits a decorative crest.

A war memorial is to members of the Cholmeley family: six who died during the First World War, and one on the 1919 Murmansk Front. Its inscription plaque is white marble with red lettering. This sits within a bolection mould, on a moulded bracketed shelf and beneath an entablature and pediment, all of figured cream marble. A black column with Corinthian capital is each side of the plaque. Within a segmented pediment is an escutcheon on a white marble scrolled background surmounted by a crest of griffin holding a helm.

On the south aisle west wall is a plaque with cross above, all of brass decoratively incised. It is dedicated to Lady Georgina Wentworth (1809–1880), who was the wife of Sir Montague Cholmeley M.P. of Easton Hall and Norton Place, and the daughter of the 8th Duke of St Albans.

=== Other memorials ===
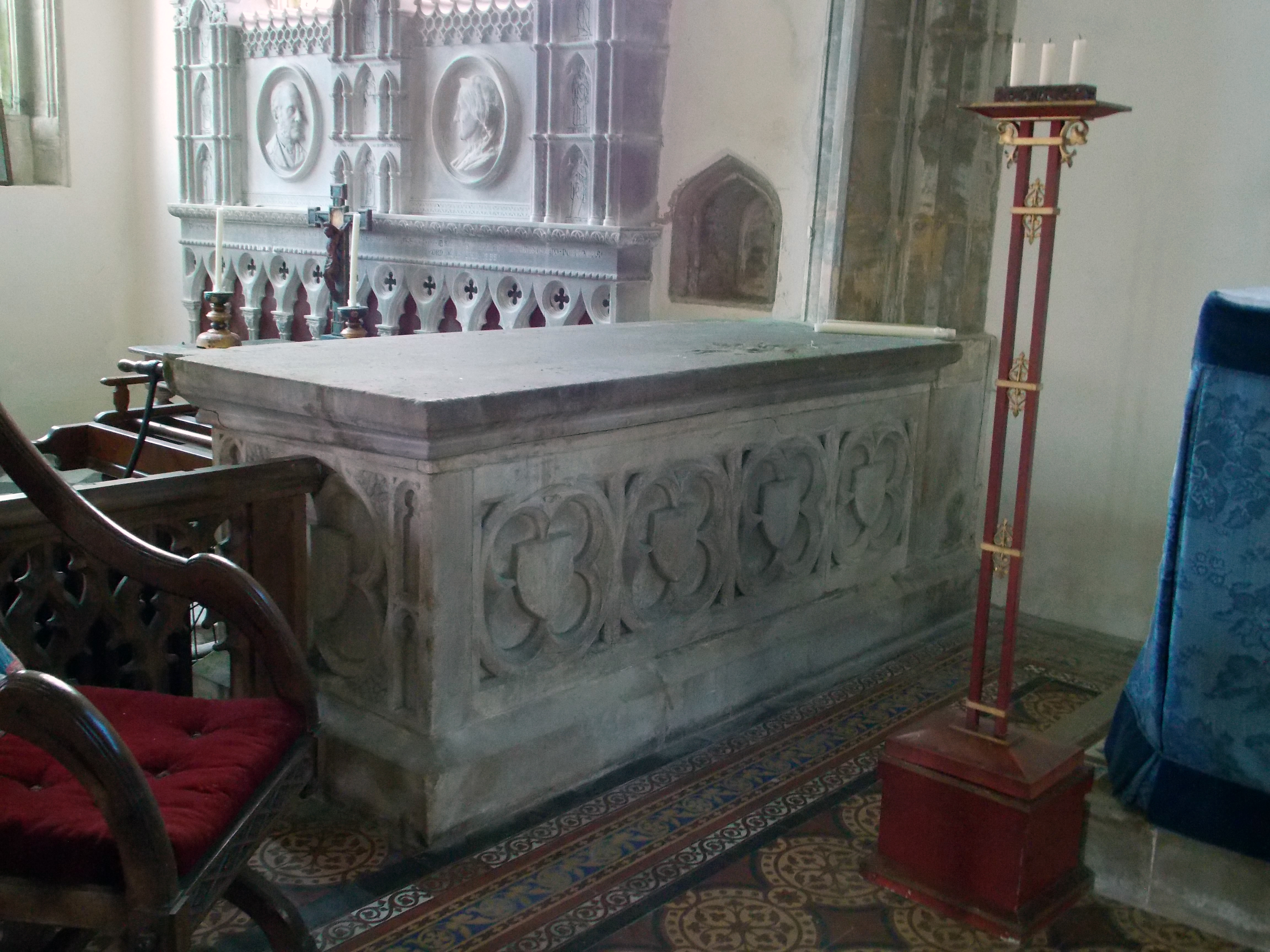
Chancel altar chest tomb of unknown origin

Within the chancel are two 15th-century stone chest tombs, one either side of the altar. The tomb at the north is panelled with quatrefoils enclosing plain shields; that at the south panelled with cusped ogee arches and plain shields. There are no inscriptions, and no information on their origin.

Brasses on chancel burial slabs are to Oliver St John (d.1497), his wife Elizabeth (d.1503), and Elizabeth's former husband Henry Rochford (d.1470). Also marked by a brass are the sons of Oliver St John. Further chancel stone slabs are to Rev Samuel Nailour (died 1764 aged 64), rector of the South Stoke mediety of St Mary, Rev Thomas Langley (died 1764 aged 34), and John Watts (died 1703).

War memorials are on either side of the tower arch facing the nave. On the south side are two plaques: one to the 2nd Battalion, Parachute Regiment "who were trained in this area and gave their lives[…] " at the Battle of Arnhem; the other to the same regiment for operational losses, including those in Bruneval and the invasion of Sicily. On the north side is a plaque, dated 1946, commemorating a tower restoration provided for by parishioners, and a dedication to three men killed during the Second World War.

On the south aisle south wall is a plaque to Algernon Augustus Markham who was rector from 1933 to 1939, and became the fifth Bishop of Grantham in 1937. A plaque to his wife is below.

The west window within the tower arch is a 1947 replacement, the original having been "destroyed by enemy action in 1941". The previous 1856 window was dedicated to Dorothea, widowed second wife of antiquarian Edmund Turnor (1755–1829).

Within the churchyard are two iron grave markers.

== Priests ==
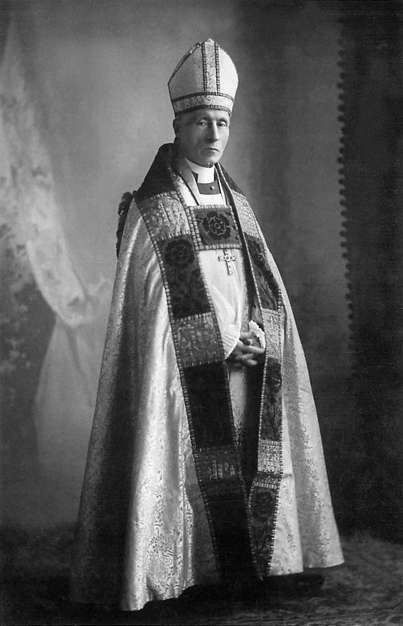
Welbore MacCarthy, rector 1910

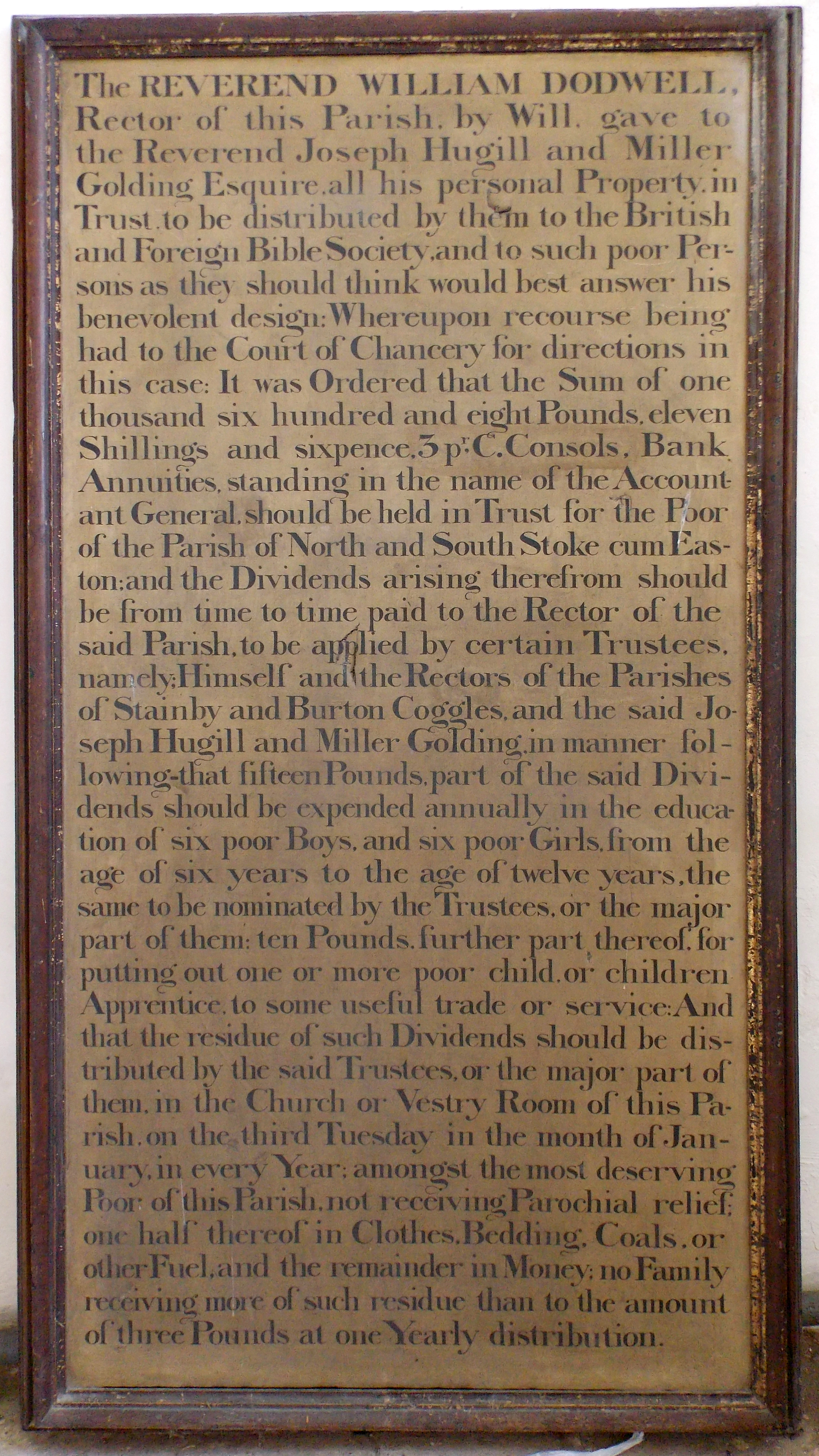
Framed reference to Rev William Dodwell (rector from 1775 to 1824) who by bequest gave his property in trust to the British and Foreign Bible Society and to the poor of the parish. The interest on £1,608 was to be distributed among the poor, either by coin or provision of fuel and clothes, and to provide a school and apprenticeships for poor children.

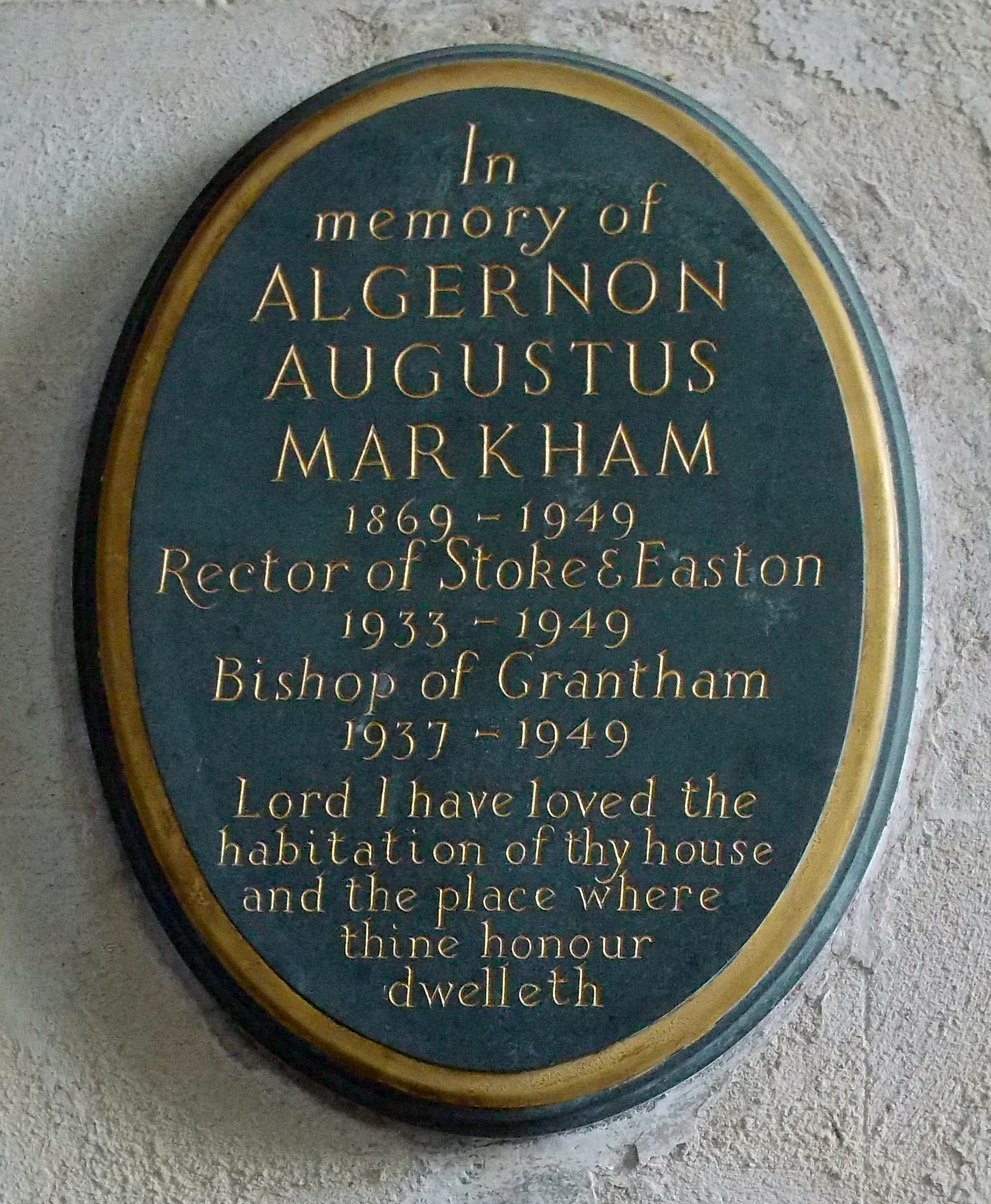
Plaque to Algernon Augustus Markham, rector 1933–1939

List of rectors, vicars and curates from the Clergy of the Church of England database, church commemorative plaques, and Kellys Directory for Lincolnshire 1855/1885/1896/1905/1909/1919/1933. Stoke priests were separate incumbents of St Andrew's Church North Stoke, and St Mary's Church South Stoke (South Stoke cum Easton), the combined living shared approximately equally between the two churches as a 'mediety'. On 13 June 1776 North and South Stoke parishes were merged, with South Stoke becoming a dual dedication.

- Reign of King John – Richard de Bassingham (St Andrew)
- Reign of King John – Walter de Stoke (St Mary)
- 1209 – William son of Robert (St Andrew)
- 1209 – John de Colmere (St Mary)
- 1230 – Thomas de Eboraco (St Andrew)
- 1244 – Nicholas Bacum (St Mary)
- 1269 – Nicholas de Eboraco (St Andrew)
- ???? – John Hook (St Mary)
- c. 1272 – Henry de Billingboro (St Andrew)
- 1281 – John de Billingsgate (St Mary)
- 1282 – Nicholas de Walescote (St Andrew)
- ???? – Elias de Hoxen (St Andrew)
- 1296 – John de Stakerhern (St Mary)
- ???? – Roger (St Mary)
- 1340 – John de Marckham (St Andrew)
- 1349 – John de Browne (St Mary)

The Black Death 1349 to 1369; during and after this period priests for the North Stoke and South Stoke medieties not always identifiable

- d.1361 – William
- 1361 – William de Walmesford
- ???? – William de Tykton (senior)
- 1365 – William de Tykton (junior)
- 1380 – William Scoter (St Andrew)
- c. 1399 – Alan Pete
- 1406 – John Rayncock
- ???? – John Sallowe
- 1419 – Nicholas de Hungerton
- ???? – William Heyne
- 1428 – John Mason
- 1428 – Robert Green of Quorndon
- 1429 – John Metham
- ???? – Thomas Southam (St Andrew)
- ???? – Thomas Robert Holland (St Mary)
- 1440 – John Halton (St Andrew)
- ???? – Richard Feryby
- 1443 – William Wycham LLD
- ???? – William Hoveden
- 1451 – Richard Heyndmat
- ???? – Thomas Palmer (St Mary)
- 1452 – Robert Randall (St Mary)
- 1456 – John More (St Andrew)
- 1463 – Richard Graver (St Andrew)
- 1472 – Richard Harrison (St Andrew)
- 1474 – William Copsey d.1500 (St Andrew)
- 1475 – John Fox (St Mary)
- 1477 – Matthew Whittlowe (St Mary)
- 1479 – John Wymark (St Mary)
- 1480 – Thomas Baroby (St Mary)
- 1481 – Richard Halton (St Mary)
- 1487 – John Newton (St Mary)
- 1496 – John Wellys (St Mary)
- 1500 – Edward Matthew (or Machell), (St Andrew)
- 1502 – John Hartlipole (St Mary)
- 1505 – Sir John Langor (St Mary)

Secession and break with Rome (1534)

- ???? – Sir William Waynewright (St Andrew)
- 1537 – Sir Robert Richardson (St Mary)
- 1539 – Sir Richard Waulkwood (St Andrew) deprived through participation in the Lincolnshire Rising of the Pilgrimage of Grace
- 1551 – Richard Quyon AM (St Mary)
- 1554 – Nicholas Aspinall (St Andrew)
- 1554 – John Tirrey (St Mary)
- 1557 – William Sheffield (St Mary)
- 1566 – Richard (or Thomas) Evatt
- c. 1580 – William Wetherley (St Andrew)
- 1587 – Nicholas Walker (St Andrew)
- 1590 – William Hodgkins (St Mary)
- 1607 – William Dale (St Mary)
- 1641 – Robert Price (St Andrew)

Interregnum (1649)
Restoration (1660)

- 1661 – Robert Price MA (St Mary)
- 1697 – Henry Barker MA (St Andrew)
- 1697 – Samuel Naylor MA (St Mary)
- 1709 – John Harrison (senior) MA, (St Mary)
- 1724 – John Harrison (junior) MA, (St Mary)
- 1726 – Thomas Day MA (St Andrew)
- 1746 – Thomas Balguy MA (St Andrew)
- 1771 – Thomas Henchman (St Andrew)
- 1775 – William Dodwell MA (St Andrew); also vicar of Wragby and East Torrington

Union of North Stoke St Andrew and South Stoke St Mary parishes (1775)

- 1776 – William Dodwell MA
- 1824 – Henry Taylor; also vicar of Ashby near Spilsby
- 1842 – Richard Belton Cartwright (living in the gift of the Prebendary of South Grantham in Lincoln Cathedral)
- 1865 – Cecil Edward Fisher (Prebendary of Lafford)
- 1879 – Frederick Jesson MA, Trinity College, Dublin (living in the gift of Bishop Wordsworth of Lincoln)
- 1894 – Richard E. Warner (Prebendary of Bedford Major in Lincoln Cathedral)
- 1910 – Welbore MacCarthy (Prebendary of Empingham in Lincoln Cathedral; first Bishop of Grantham)
- 1918 – John Edward Hine (Prebendary in Lincoln Cathedral; formerly missionary to Likoma; and Bishop of Nyasaland, Zanzibar and Northern Rhodesia; second Bishop of Grantham; living in the gift of Bishop Hicks of Lincoln)
- 1927 – Francis Higgs Dalby MA, Christ Church, Oxford, (Prebendary of St Martin's in Lincoln Cathedral; vicar of Clee cum Cleethorpes 1901–1927)
- 1933 – Algernon Augustus Markham (Prebendary in Lincoln Cathedral; vicar of Grimsby 1908–1928; vicar of Grantham 1928–1933; Dean of Stamford 1936; fifth Bishop of Grantham 1937)
- 1949 – Anthony Otter (Canon of Southwell; vicar of Lowdham 1931–1949; sixth Bishop of Grantham 1949)
- 1967 – Clement Gordon Cumpper Robertson (Prebendary in Lincoln Cathedral)
- 1968 – Herbert Briggs; also vicar of Great Ponton

United Benefice of the Colsterworth Group of Churches (1984)

- 1984-1990 – David Frank Fosbuary
- 1992 – John Cook
- 2002 – David Carney
- 2006 – Hilary Creisow
- 2010 – Eric John Lomax
- 2019 - Neil Griffiths (deacon at Leicester Cathedral 2014)

== Gallery ==
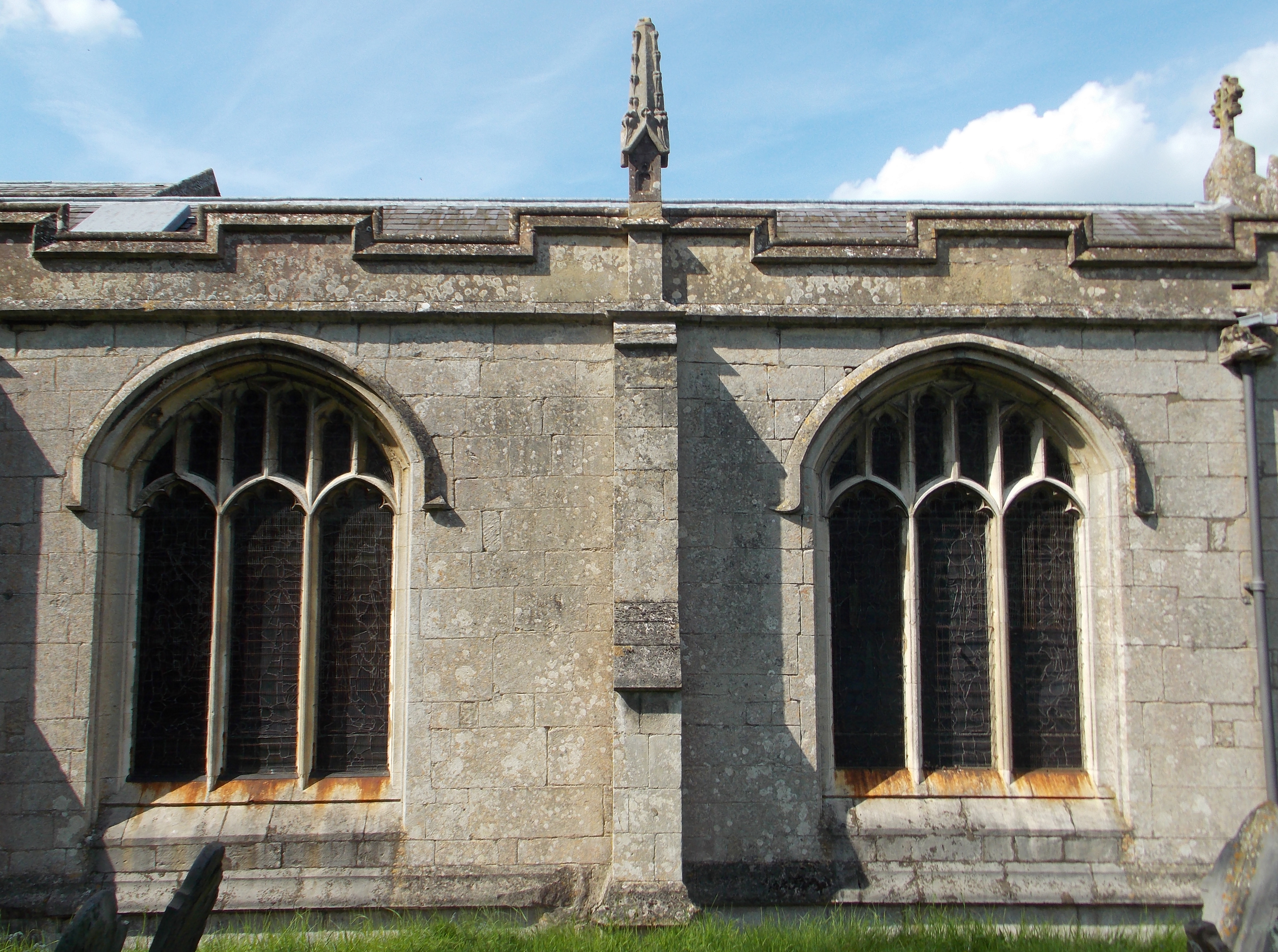
South chapel windows

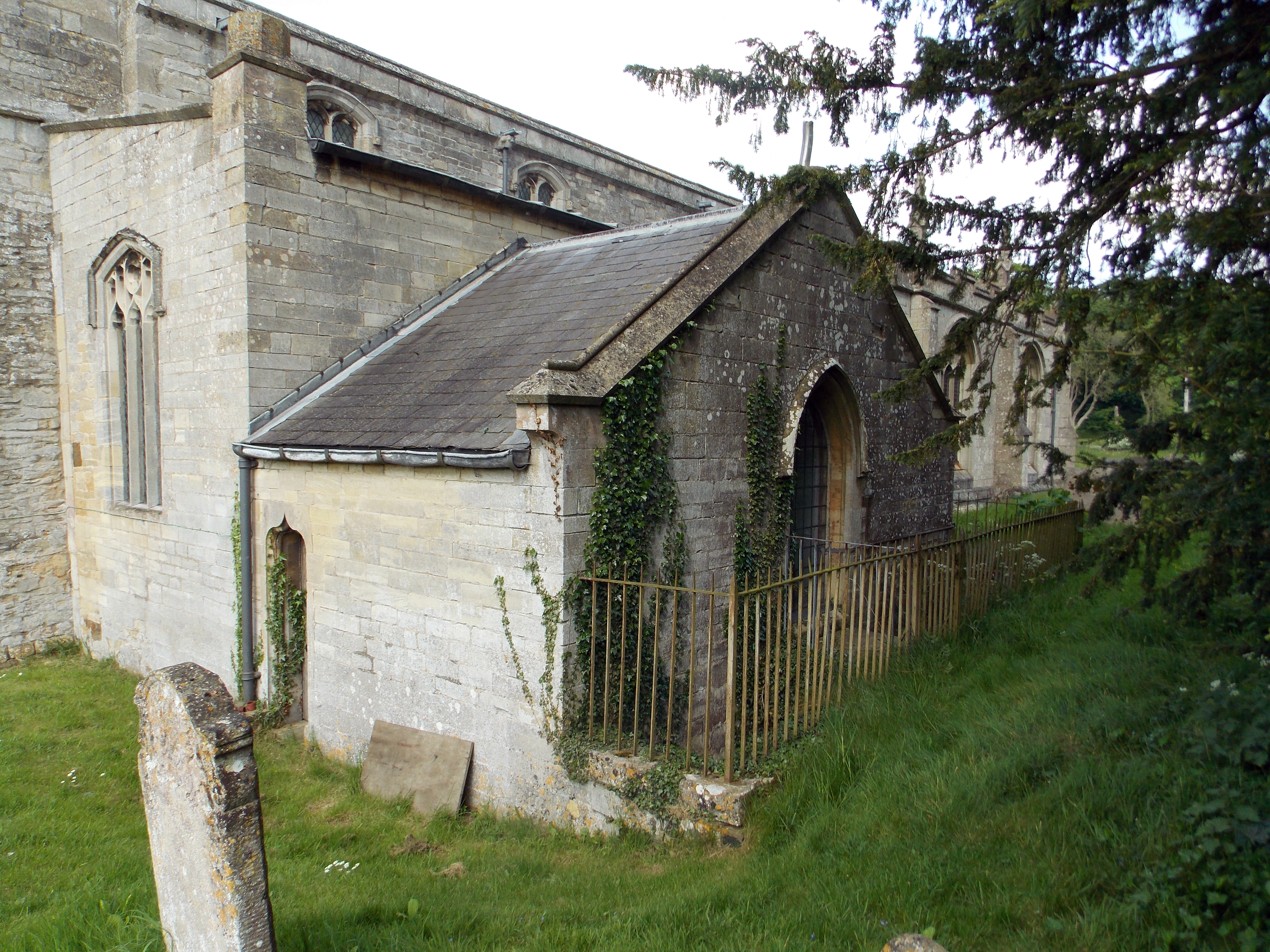
Vestry

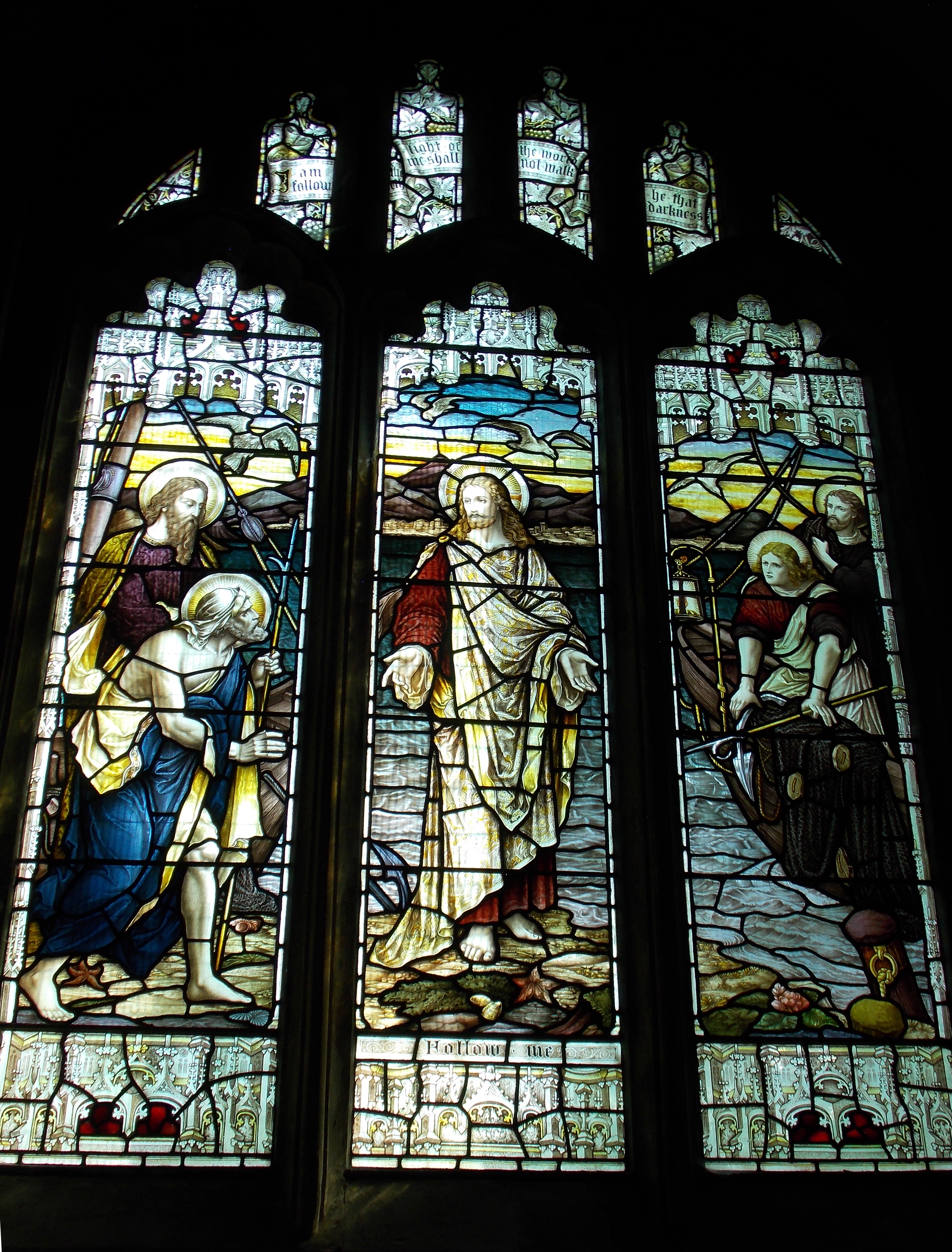
Window dedicated to Hugh Arthur Henry Cholmeley

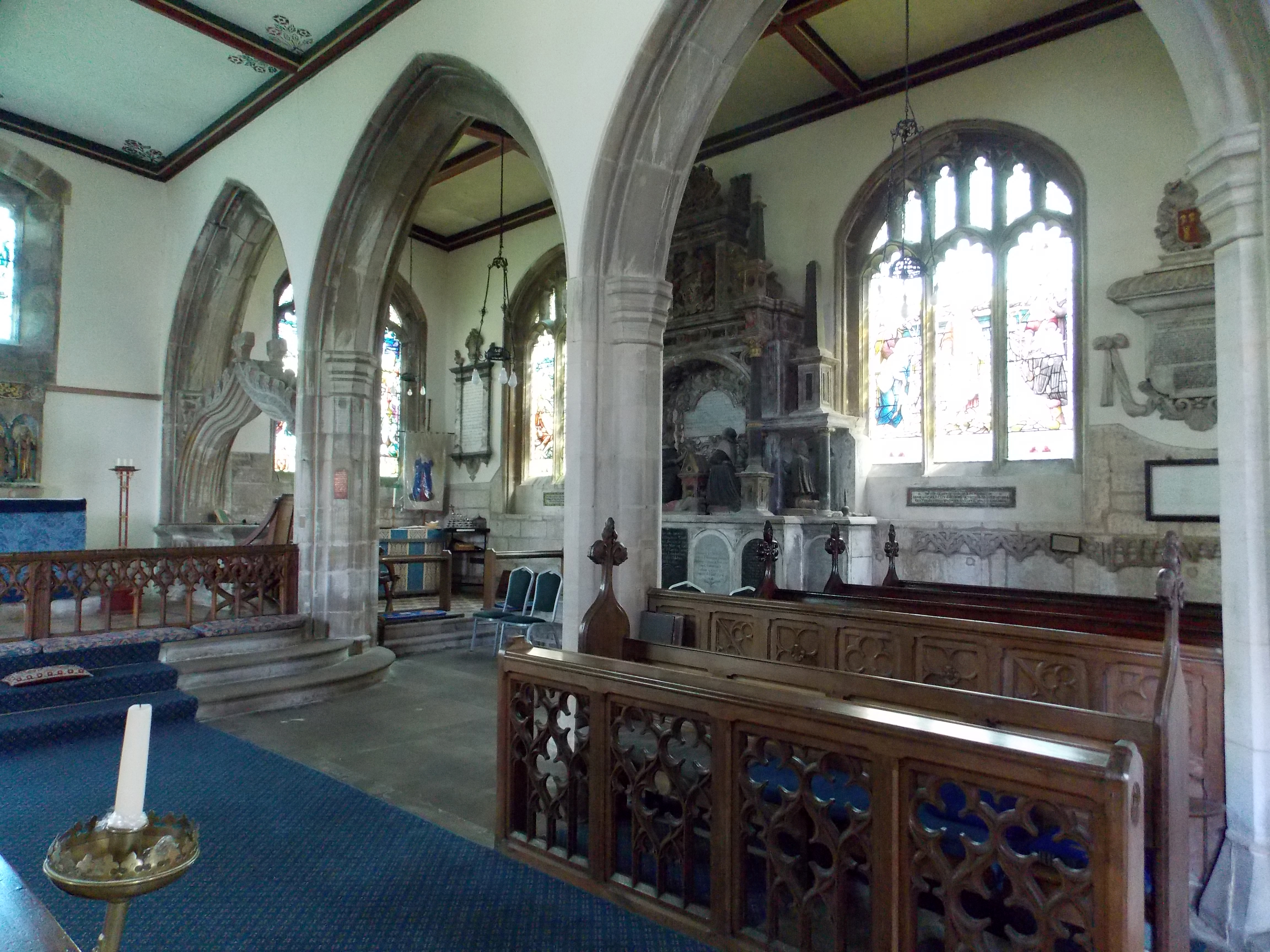
South chapel from chancel, with choir stalls

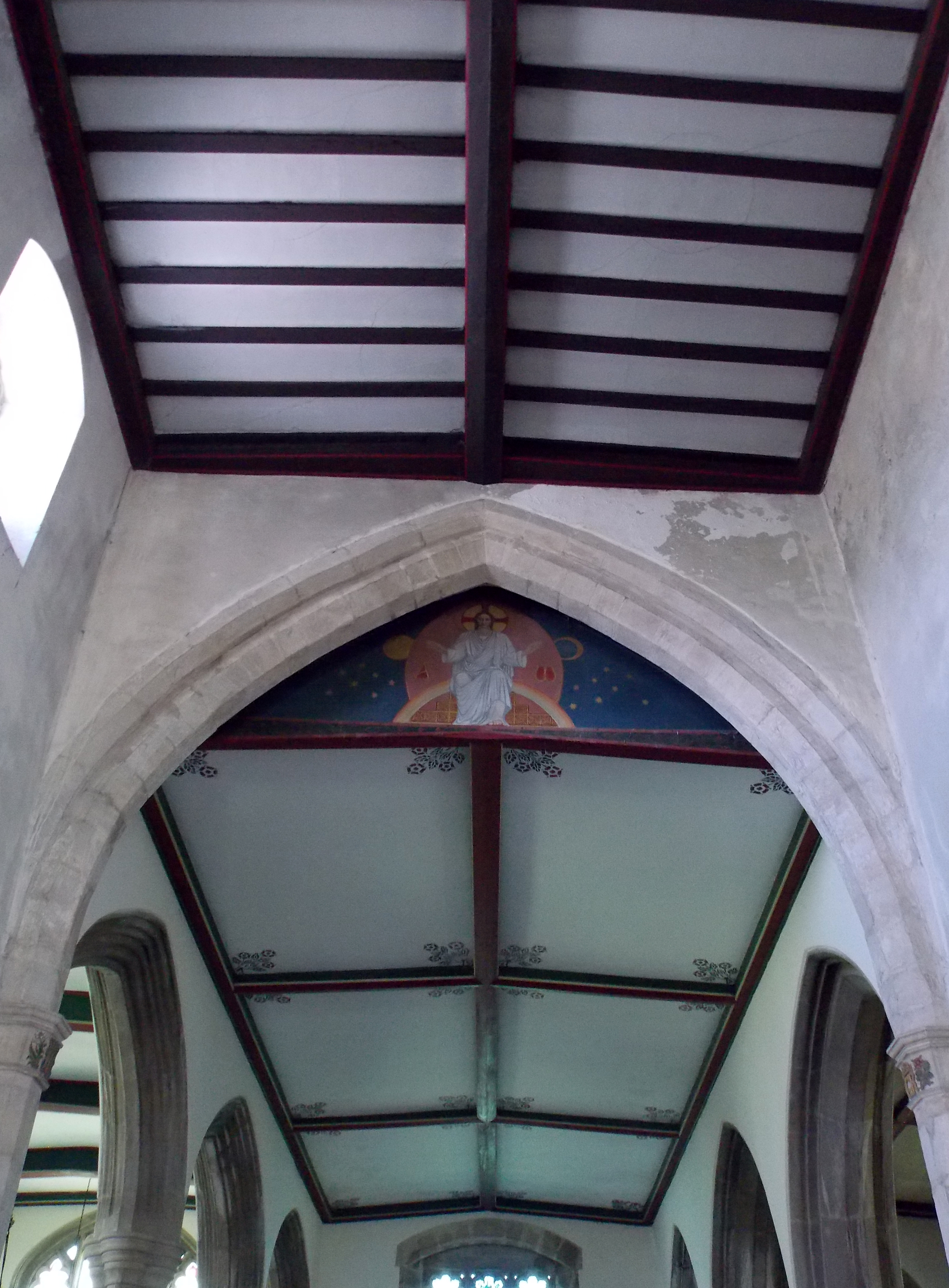
Chancel and nave ceiling, with Jessie Bayes' painting

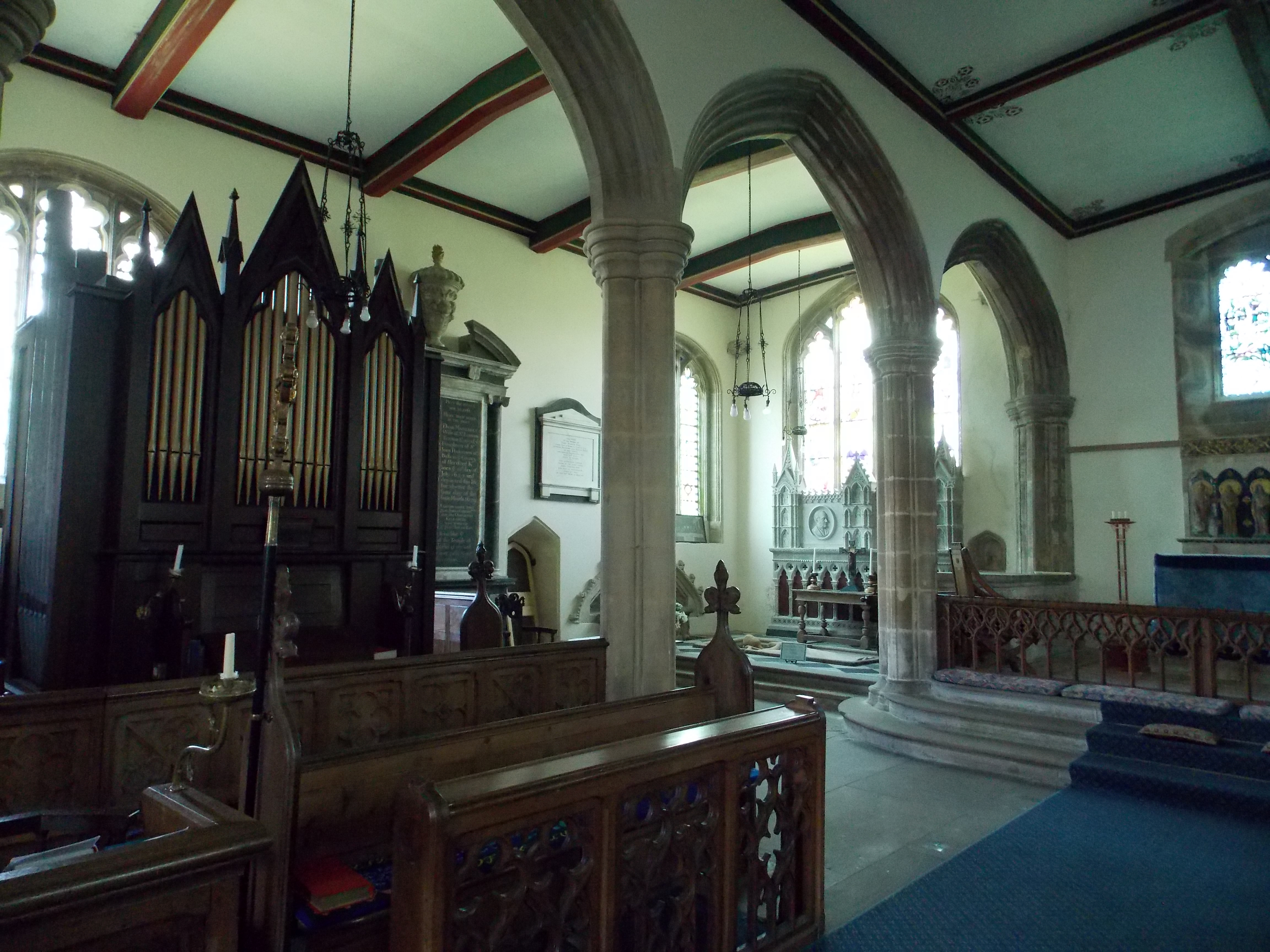
North chapel from the chancel, with organ and choir stalls

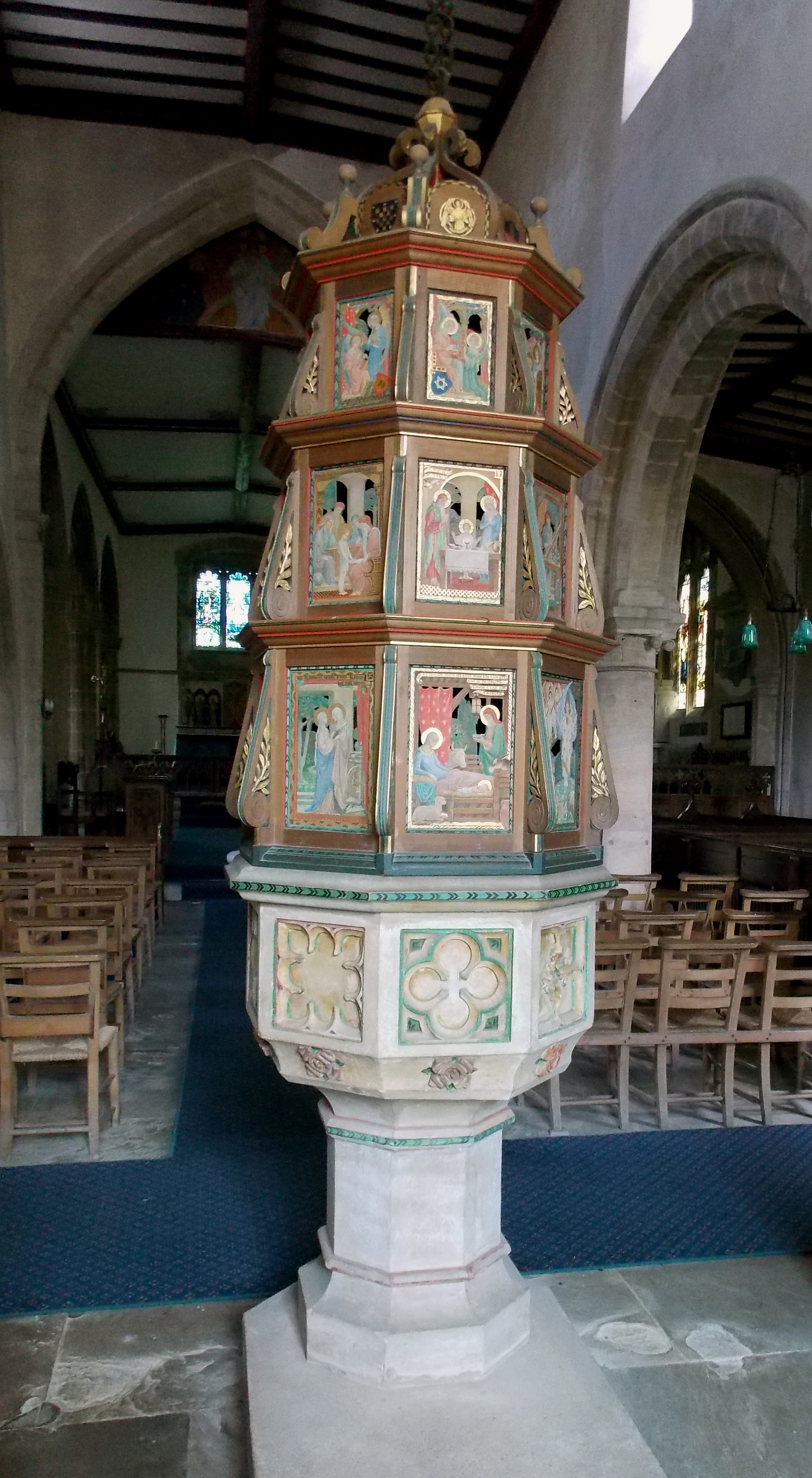
Font

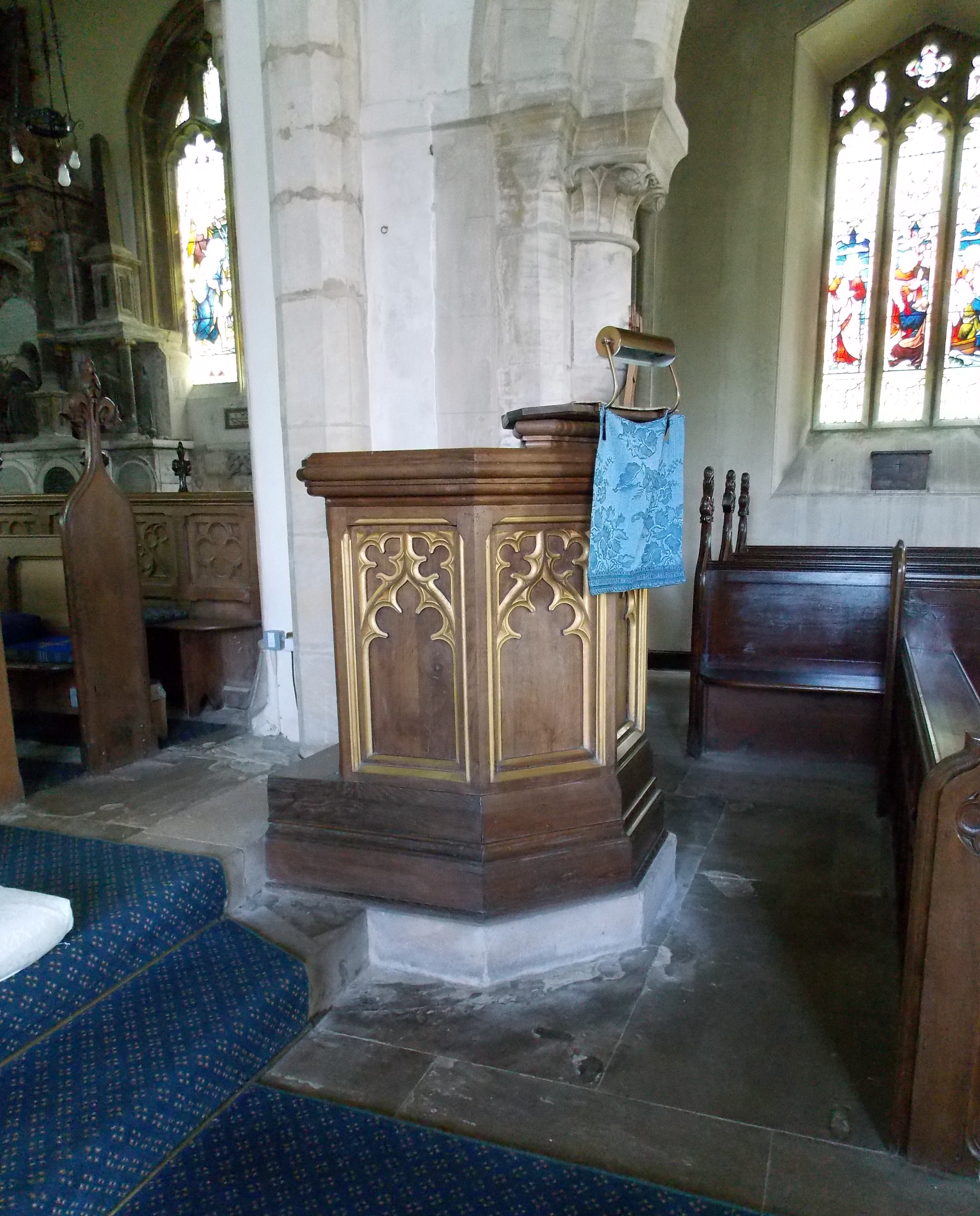
Pulpit

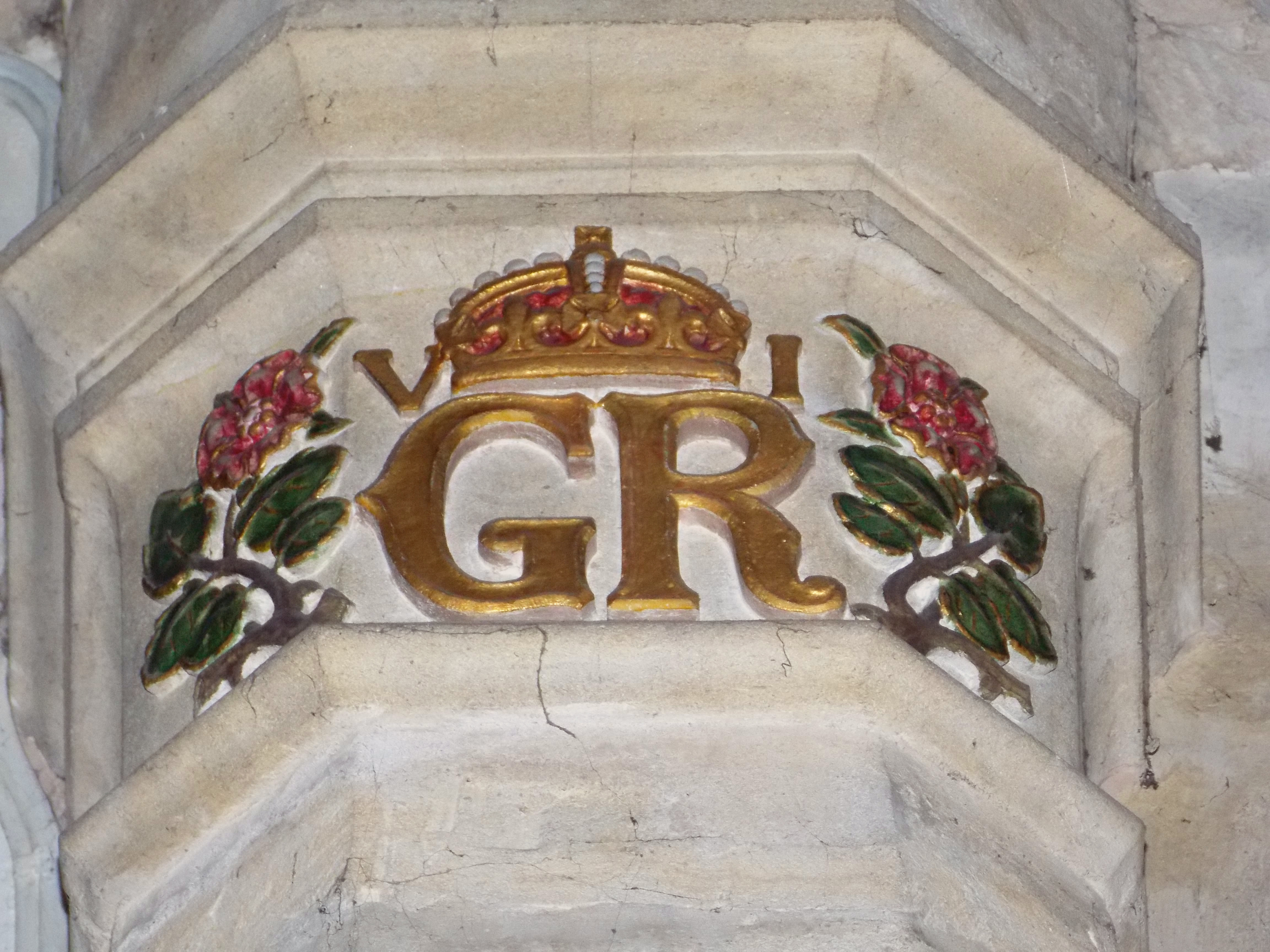
George VI cypher on chancel arch capital

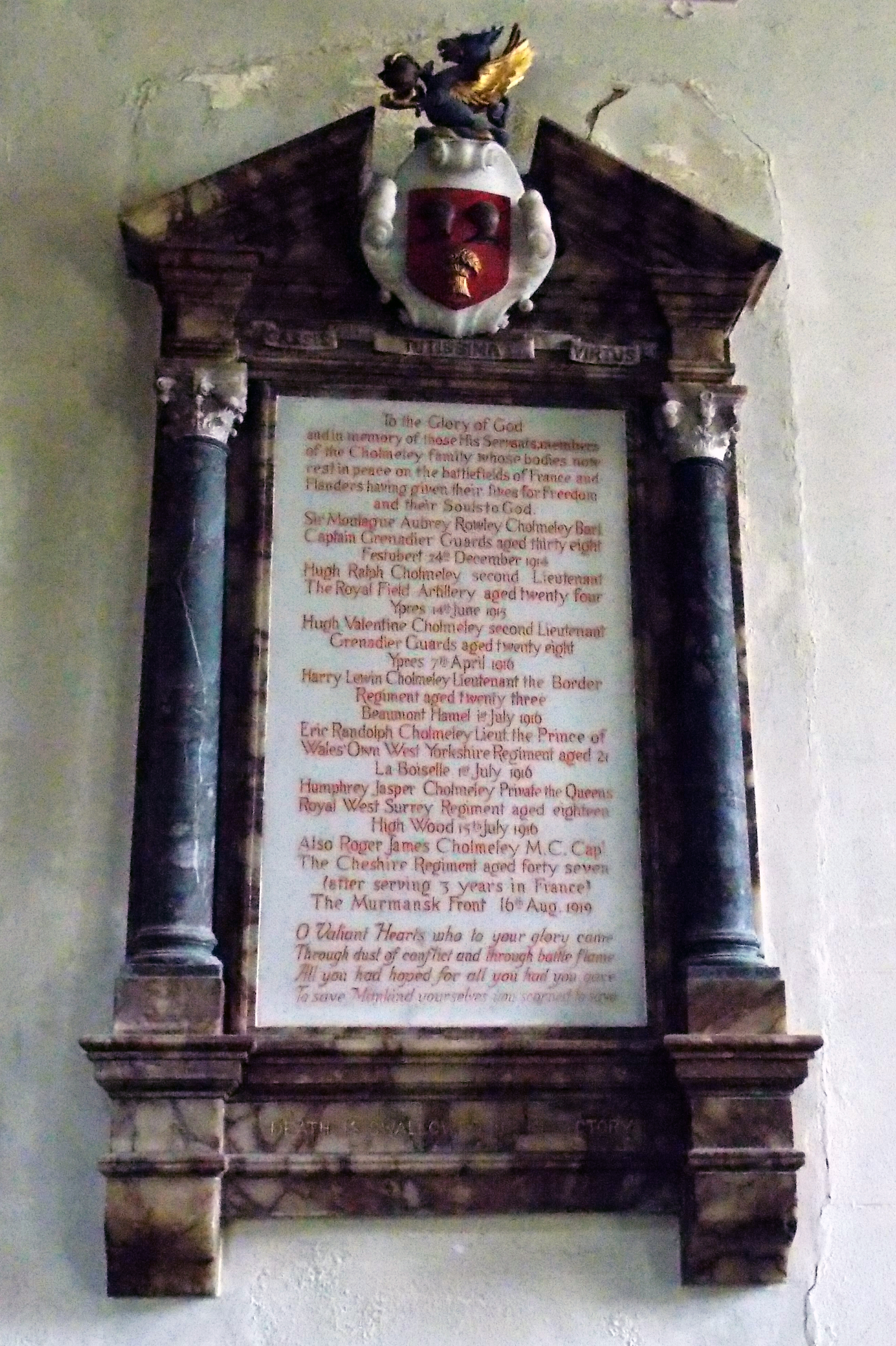
Cholmeley war memorial

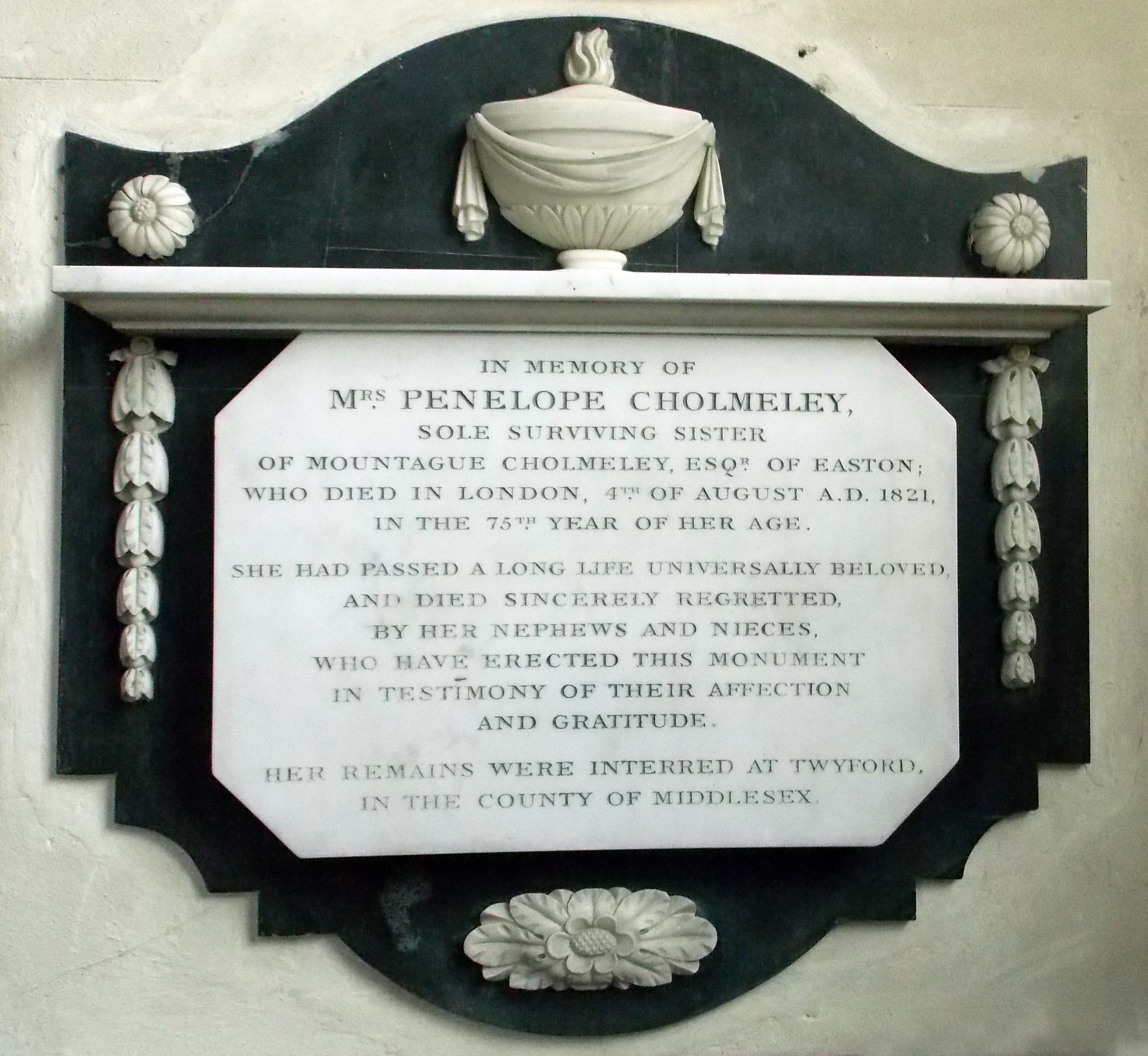
Memorial to Mrs Pamela Cholmeley

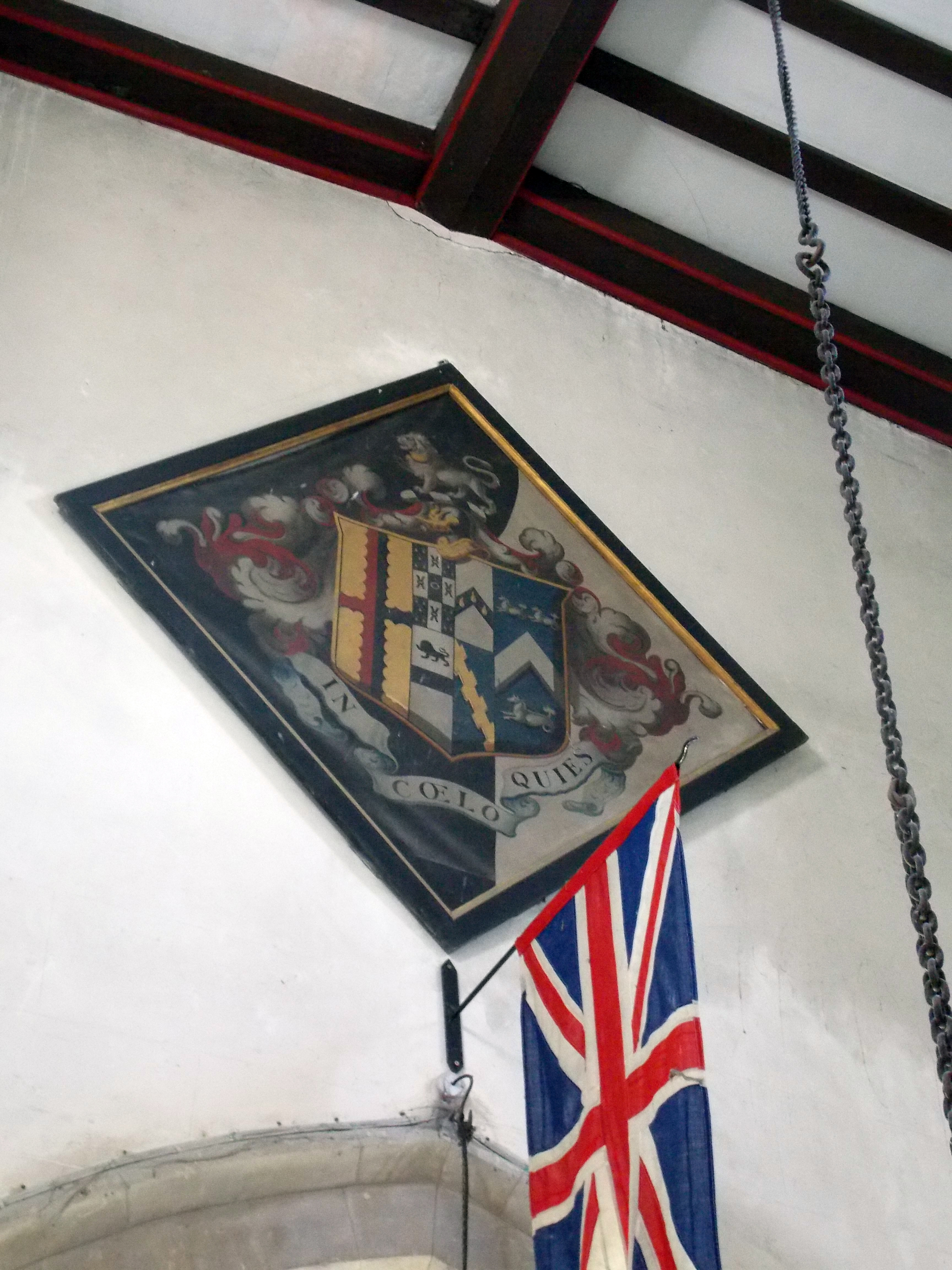
Funerary hatchment above the tower arch

== See also ==
- Cholmeley baronets
