= Kelly (given name) =

- Pronunciation: /ˈkɛli/
- Gender: Unisex
- Language: English

Origin
- Language: Irish
- Origin: Ceallagh, Ó Ceallaigh
- Meaning: 'monastery church'

Other names
- Variant form: Kelleigh

Kelly is a unisex given name derived from an Anglicized version of the Irish masculine name Ceallach or a transferred use of the Irish surname O'Ceallaigh. O'Ceallaigh, which means "descendant of Ceallach", was Anglicized as Kelly or O'Kelly; the meaning of the personal name Ceallach is uncertain. It could mean "bright-headed," or "strife" or "monastery church" in Irish. As a name of Irish origin, the Kelly surname is partially an anglicised version of older Irish names, especially Ó Ceallaigh, though the name Kelly is also present to a lesser extent in other Celtic cultures. Kelly is historically a male-only name, but has been used as a female given name since the 1960s, though with a significant minority usage as a masculine name, especially within Celtic families.

== Etymology ==
The surname Kelly has multiple origins. There is a Clan Kelly in Scotland, possibly derived from a toponym Kelloe. The Irish surname may be from either Ó Ceallaigh or Ó Cadhla, or yet again from a toponym. The surname was established in the United States by the early 19th century, and it began to be used as a masculine name in the later 19th century. Feminine usage first appeared in the 1940s and surpassed masculine usage around 1957 due to the popularity of the American actress Grace Kelly.

== Popularity ==
According to the U.S. Social Security Administration, Kelly, as a name for a girl, was ranked No. 900 in 1950, then steadily gained popularity until 1977 (peaking at rank No. 10); Kelly, as a name for a boy, was consistently in the top 800 (but never the top 300) from 1881 to 1939, then steadily gained popularity until 1968 (peaking at rank No. 97). The feminine name reached two significant peaks, rank No. 12 in 1968, then declining to rank No. 23 in 1972, and again rising to rank No. 10 in 1977; both the feminine and the masculine name have been in steady decline since reaching their respective popularity peaks; the masculine name fell below rank No. 1000 in 2003; the feminine name lingers at rank No. 367 as of 2013.

In the United Kingdom, it made its way into the top 50 during the 1970s and by 1984 was the 15th most popular feminine first name. However, 10 years later it had declined to 53rd place and by 1999 had fallen out of the top 100.

== People with the name ==
=== Feminine name ===
- Kelly Ayotte (born 1968), American politician
- Kelly J. Baker (born 1980), American writer and editor
- Kelly Brook (born 1979), English model and actress
- Kelly M. Burke, American politician
- Kelly Chen (born 1972), Chinese singer and actress
- Kelly Cheung (born 1990), American actress and television host
- Kelly Carlson (born 1976), American actress
- Kelly Clark (born 1983), American snowboarder
- Kelly Clark (footballer) (born 1994), Scottish footballer
- Kelly Clarkson (born 1982), American singer
- Kelly Craft (born 1962), American diplomat
- Kelly Curtis (1956–2026), American actress
- Kelly Curtis (skeleton racer) (born 1989), American skeleton racer
- Kelly DeRidder, Canadian politician
- Kelly Ellard (born 1982), Canadian murderer
- Kelly Evans (born 1985), American journalist
- Kelly Rae Finley (born 1985), American basketball coach
- Kelly J. Ford, American novelist
- Kelly Fraga (born 1974), Brazilian volleyball player
- Kelly Fraser (1993–2019), Canadian singer and songwriter
- Kelly Frost (born 1999), British writer
- Kelly Fyffe-Marshall, Canadian filmmaker
- Kelly Gadéa (born 1991), French footballer
- Kelly Gago (born 1999), French footballer
- Kelly Gale (born 1995), Swedish model
- Kelly Sims Gallagher, American international affairs scholar
- Kelly Gee, American public official
- Kelly Haxton (born 1982), Canadian soccer player
- Kelly Higashi, American judge and lawyer
- Kelly Holmes (born 1970), British athlete
- Kelly Hoppen (born 1959), South African-British interior designer
- Kelly Hu (born 1968), American actress
- Kelly Hyman (born 1969) is an Australian-American attorney and president of the Federal Bar Association in Palm Beach County, Florida
- Kelly Johnson (1958–2007), English guitarist (Girlschool)
- Kelly Keen (1978–1981), animal attack victim
- Kelly Kelekidou (born 1979), Greek singer
- Kelly Kelly (born 1987), Ring name of American professional wrestler, model, and former WWE Diva Barbara Blank
- Kelly Key (born 1983), Brazilian singer
- Kelly Kulick (born 1977), American bowler
- Kelly LeBrock (born 1960), English-American actress and model
- Kelly Llorenna (born 1975), English singer
- Kelly Loeffler (born 1970), American businesswoman and politician
- Kelly Lynch, (born 1959), American actress
- Kelly Macdonald (born 1976), Scottish actress
- Kelly Marie (born 1957), Scottish singer
- Kelly McCormick (born 1960), American diver
- Kelly McGillis (born 1957), American actress
- Kelly McGonigal (born 1977), American psychologist
- Kelly Merrick (born 1975), American politician
- Kelly Metcalfe, Canadian scientist and a professor
- Kelly Mitchell, American politician
- Kelly Morrison (born 1969), American politician and physician
- Kelly Murphy (born 1977), American illustrator
- Kelly Noonan Murphy (born 1974 or 1975), American politician
- Kelly Murphy (born 1989), American volleyball player
- Kelly Overton, American actress
- Kelly Osbourne (born 1984), English actress and designer
- Kelly Pace, multiple people
- Kelly Pannek (born 1995), American ice hockey player
- Kelly Poon (born 1983), Chinese singer
- Kelly Piquet (born 1988), Brazilian model, columnist, blogger and public relations professional
- Kelly Preston (1962–2020), American actress
- Kelly Price (born 1973), American singer
- Kelly M. Miller, American academic
- Kelly Ripa (born 1970), American actress and talk show host
- Kelly Rondestvedt (born 1975), American investment banker and German princess
- Kelly Rosen (born 1995), Estonian footballer
- Kelly Rowland (born 1981), American singer (Destiny's Child)
- Kelly Rutherford (born 1968), American actress
- Kelly Sheridan (born 1977), Canadian voice actress
- Kelly Sildaru (born 2002), Estonian freestyle skier
- Kelly Smith (born 1978), English footballer
- Kelly Somers (born 1986), English sports reporter and presenter
- Kelly Sotherton (born 1976), British heptathlete
- Kelly Stables (born 1978), American actress
- Kelly Stefanyshyn (born 1982), Canadian swimmer
- Kelly Stephens-Tysland (born 1983), American ice hockey player
- Kelly Ten Hagen, American glycobiologist
- Kelly Thomas (born 1981), British bobsledder
- Kelly Thompson, American novelist and comic book writer
- Kelly Thornton (born 1997), Irish actress
- Kelly Thornton (born 1965), Canadian theatre director and dramaturge
- Kelly Timilty (1962–2012), American politician
- Kelly Ann Tinyes (1975–1989), American murder victim
- Kelly Wilson (disambiguation), multiple people
- Kelly Wearstler (born 1967), American designer
- Kelly Yu (born 1989), Canadian-Chinese singer

=== Masculine name ===
- Kelly Alexander (born 1948), American politician
- Kelly Armstrong (born 1972), American politician
- Kelly Asbury (1960–2020), American animated film director and screenwriter
- Kelly Bailey, composer and sound designer at Valve for the Half-Life video game series
- Kelly Bennett (born 1971), Zimbabwean cricketer
- Kelly Brown (born 1982), Scottish rugby player
- Kelly Bryant (born 1996), American football player
- Kelly Blatz (born 1987), American actor and singer
- Kelly Clark (lawyer) (1957–2013), American lawyer and politician
- Kelly Chase (born 1967), Canadian ice hockey player and broadcaster
- Kelly Coleman (1938–2019), American basketball player
- Kelly Collins (born 1965), American racing driver
- Kelly C. Crabb (1946–2019), American lawyer
- Kelly DeVries (born 1956), American historian
- Kelly Flynn (1954–2021), American politician
- Kelly Allen Frank, American fugitive
- Kelly Gage (1925–2017), American lawyer and politician
- Kelly Gatts, American politician
- Kelly Girtz, American politician
- Kelly Graves (born 1963), American basketball coach
- Kelly Gruber (born 1963), American baseball player
- Kelly Holcomb (born 1973), American football player
- Kelly Hrudey (born 1961), Canadian ice hockey player and broadcaster
- Kelly Johnson (1910–1990), American aeronautical engineer
- Kelly Johnson (born 1982), American baseball player
- Kelly D. Johnston (born 1956), American government official
- Kelly Jones (born 1964), American tennis player
- Kelly Jones (born 1974), Welsh musician
- Kelly Keagy (born 1952) vocalist and drummer for American band Night Ranger
- Kelly Kirchbaum (born 1957), American football player
- Kelly Kite (born 1947), American politician
- Kelly Makin (fl. 2000s), Canadian television and movie director
- Kelly Mantle (born 1976), American actor, singer/songwriter, comedian, musician, drag queen and reality television personality
- Kelly McCarty (born 1975), American–Russian basketball player
- Kelly Miller (1863–1939), American mathematician and essayist
- Kelly Monteith (1942–2023), American comedian
- Kelly Olynyk (born 1991), Canadian basketball player
- Kelly Oubre (born 1995), American basketball player
- Kelly Paris (1957–2019), American baseball player
- Kelly Pavlik (born 1982), American boxer
- Kelly Perdew (born 1967), American businessman, winner of The Apprentice 2
- Kelly Perine (born 1969), American actor
- Kelly Joe Phelps (1959–2022), American musician and songwriter
- Kelly Reno (born 1966), American actor
- Kelly Slater (born 1972), American surfer
- Kelly Stinnett (born 1970), American baseball player
- Kelly Tang (born 1961), Singaporean composer
- Kelly Thomas (American football) (born 1960), American former professional football player
- Kelly Thomas (1974–2011), American man who was beaten to death
- Kelly Tripucka (born 1959), American basketball player
- Kelly Wolf (born 1961), American politician
- Kelly Williams (born 1982), American-Filipino basketball player

== Fictional characters ==
- Kelly, host of the PBS Kids Sprout preschool series The Chica Show
- Kelly, a character in Total Drama Presents: The Ridonculous Race
- Kelly Ashoona, character in Degrassi: The Next Generation
- Kelly Bailey, played by Lauren Socha on the TV series Misfits
- Kelly Collins, played by Hilary Duff in the DCOM Cadet Kelly
- Kelly Crenshaw, hardware store owner next door in the US animated series Handy Manny
- Kelly Cramer, on the soap opera One Life to Live
- Kelly Gaines, played by Jackie Swanson on the U.S. TV series Cheers
- Kelly Garrett (Charlie's Angels), played by Jaclyn Smith on the U.S. TV series Charlie's Angels'
- Kelly Erin Hannon, played by Ellie Kemper on the U.S. version of The Office
- Kelly Kapoor, played by Mindy Kaling on the U.S. version of The Office'
- Kelly Kapowski, played by Tiffani Amber Thiessen on the U.S. TV series Saved by the Bell
- Kelly Taylor, played by Jennie Garth on the U.S. TV series Beverly Hills, 90210
- Kelly Taylor, played by Brooke Kinsella on the British soap opera EastEnders
- Kelly Quinn, played by Olivia Sanabia in the fantasy-mystery Amazon Prime series Just Add Magic
- Kelly Roberts, Barbie's younger sister
- Kelly Wainwright, played by Tanya Chisholm in the Nickelodeon series Big Time Rush
- Kelly, secondary antagonist in the 2019 musical film K–12 directed by Melanie Martinez

== See also ==
- Kelly-Anne, given name
- Kelly (surname)

== Bibliography ==
- Hanks, Patrick; Hardcastle, Kate; Hodges, Flavia (2003). Oxford Dictionary of First Names. Oxford University Press. ISBN 0-19-861060-2.
