= Kaylee =

- Pronunciation: /ˈkeɪli/ KAY-lee
- Gender: Female

Origin
- Origin: English
- Meaning: Modern combination of Kay and Lee

Other names
- Related names: Caelee, Caeleigh, Caeley, Caeli, Caelie, Cailee, Caileigh, Cailey, Caili, Cailie, Caleigh, Caley, Caylee, Cayleigh, Cayley, Cayli, Caylie, Cèilidh, Kaelee, Kaeleigh, Kaeley, Kaeli, Kaelie, Kailee, Kaileigh, Kailey, Kaili, Kailie, Kaleigh, Kaley, Kayleigh, Kayley, Kayli, Kaylie

Kaylee (and its various spellings) is a feminine given name. The name is a modern English combination of the name elements Kay and Lee.

It was a popular name in the United States in the latter part of the 20th century and the early 21st century, reaching its height of popularity in 2009, when it ranked 26th among the most popular names for newborn girls. It has since declined in popularity, but remained among the top 200 names for American girls in 2023. Many variant spellings of the name are also among the most popular names for American girls.

Notable people and characters with these given names include:

== Caileigh ==
- Caileigh Filmer (born 1996), Canadian Olympic rower

== Kaeli ==
- Kaeli McEwen (born 2000), American TikTok personality known professionally as Kaeli Mae

== Kailee ==
- Kailee Dunn, Miss Washington 2014
- Kailee Moore (born 1998), American singer-songwriter known professionally as Kailee Morgue
- Kailee Wong (born 1976), American football linebacker

== Kaleigh ==
- Kaleigh Cronin (born 1989), American actress and singer
- Kaleigh Fratkin (born 1992), Canadian ice hockey player
- Kaleigh Gilchrist (born 1992), American surfer and water polo player
- Kaleigh Kurtz (born 1994), American soccer player
- Kaleigh Quennec (born 1998), Canadian-Swiss Olympic ice hockey player
- Kaleigh Rafter (born 1986), Canadian Olympic softball player
- Kaleigh Riehl (born 1996), American soccer player
- Kaleigh Trace (born 1986), Canadian writer

== Kaylea ==
- Kaylea Arnett (born 1993), American diver

== Kaylee ==
- Kaylee Bryant (born 1997), American actress and model
- Kaylee Dakers (born 1991), Canadian breaststroke swimmer
- Kaylee DeFer (born 1986), American actress
- Kaylee Frye, a character from the TV series Firefly and Serenity
- Kaylee Hartung (born 1985), American television journalist
- Kaylee Hottle (2008–2026), American actress
- Kaylee Goncalves, American murder victim

== Kayleigh ==
- Kayleigh Chetcuti (born 2000), Maltese footballer
- Kayleigh Gibbs (née Crowe), a character on Emmerdale
- Kayleigh Gilbert, South African actress
- Kayleigh Green (born 1988), British footballer
- Kayleigh Haywood, British murder victim
- Kayleigh Heckel (born 2006), American basketball player
- Kayleigh Hines (born 1991), English footballer
- Kayleigh McEnany (born 1988), American political commentator and writer
- Kayleigh McKee (born 1994), American voice actress
- Kayleigh Morton, a fictional character on Coronation Street
- Kayleigh Pearson (born 1985), English model
- Kayleigh O'Reilly, semi-finalist in the Miss Earth 2009 pageant
- Kayleigh Rae (born 1992), Scottish wrestler
- Kayleigh Rose Amstutz (born 1998), American singer and songwriter known professionally as Chappell Roan
- Kayleigh Yeoman, participant on Operation Transformation

== Kayli ==
- Kayli Barker (born 1997), American race car driver
- Kayli Carter (born 1993), American actress
- Kayli Mills (born 1994), American voice actress

== Kaylie ==
- Kaylie Buck (born 2000), Canadian Olympic snowboarder
- Kaylie Collins (born 1998), American soccer player
- Kaylie Hooper, character in American TV comedy series 30 Rock
- Kaylie Jones (born 1960), American writer
- Kaylie Kaitschuck (born 1995), American artist

== See also ==
- Caley (given name), a list of people with the given name
- Caylee (name), a list of people with the given name
- Cayley (surname), a list of people with the surname
- Kailey (name), a list of people with the given name and surname
- Kaley (disambiguation), a list of articles with the title
- Kayleigh (given name), a list of people with the given name
- Kayla (name), a list of people with the given name
