= 2016 Reading F.C. Women season =

Reading FC Women
2016 season
- Manager: Kelly Chambers
- Stadium: Adams Park, High Wycombe
- FA WSL 1: 8th
- FA Cup: Quarter-final vs Sunderland
- WSL Cup: First round vs Arsenal
- Top goalscorer: League: Emma Follis (4); All: Emma Follis (6)

The 2016 season was Reading's first season in the FA WSL 1, after winning promotion from the FA WSL 2 in 2015.

== Season events ==
On 23 December 2015, Reading announced the signing of Amber-Keegan Stobbs from Washington Spirit.

On 28 December 2015, Reading announced their second signing prior to the 2016 FA WSL, with Kayleigh Hines signing from Oxford United for an undisclosed fee.

On 8 January, Reading announced the signing of Jade Boho from Bristol Academy.

On 19 February, Reading announced the signing of Mary Earps from Bristol Academy.

On 30 June, Reading announced the signing of Remi Allen to a long-term contract from Birmingham City for an undisclosed fee.

On 6 July, Reading completed the signing of Sophie Perry on a free transfer after her Brighton & Hove Albion contract had expired.

At the end of the 2016 season, Shelly Cox, Amber-Keegan Stobbs, Lois Roche, Jade Boho, Laura May Walkley. Helen Ward and Nia Jones were all released by the club.

== Squad ==
As of match played 6 November 2016

No.	Name	Nationality	Position	Date of birth (Age (Note: Age as of the end of the season))	Signed from	Signed in	Contract ends	Apps.	Goals
Goalkeepers
19	Mary Earps	(England)	GK	7 March 1993 (aged 23)	Bristol Academy	2016			
39	Chloe Sansom	(England)	GK	17 October 1996 (aged 20)	Academy	2016		0	0
Defenders
2	Becky Jane	(England)	DF	6 August 1996 (aged 20)	Chelsea	2011			
3	Harriet Scott	(Republic of Ireland)	DF	10 February 1993 (aged 23)	Academy	2009			
5	Molly Bartrip	(England)	DF	1 June 1996 (aged 20)	Academy	2014			
6	Kirsty McGee	(England)	DF	19 April 1987 (aged 29)	Portsmouth	2014			
12	Kylie Davies	(Wales)	DF	25 September 1987 (aged 29)	Millwall Lionesses	2015			
13	Sophie Perry	(Republic of Ireland)	DF	11 November 1986 (aged 29)	Unattached	2016		7	0
16	Shelly Cox	(England)	DF	16 May 1984 (aged 32)	Doncaster Belles	2014			
22	Nia Jones	(Wales)	DF	6 April 1992 (aged 24)	Cardiff City	2015			
	Georgia Hayes	(England)	DF						
Midfielders
4	Kayleigh Hines	(England)	MF	27 February 1991 (aged 25)	Oxford United	2016			
7	Emma Follis	(England)	MF	6 January 1992 (aged 24)	Aston Villa	2015			
8	Remi Allen	(England)	MF	15 October 1990 (aged 26)	Birmingham City	2016		9	0
10	Lois Roche	(Republic of Ireland)	MF	18 June 1993 (aged 23)	Academy	2012			
14	Laura May Walkley	(Wales)	MF	19 May 1991 (aged 25)	Cardiff Met.	2014			
21	Rebekah Haines	(Wales)	MF	27 February 1991 (aged 25)	Academy				
23	Rachel Rowe	(Wales)	MF	13 September 1992 (aged 24)	Swansea City	2015		41	1
35	Hannah Knapton	(England)	MF		Academy				
	Zoe Cunningham	(England)	MF		Arsenal				
Forwards
9	Lauren Bruton	(England)	FW	22 November 1992 (aged 23)	Arsenal	2013			
11	Jade Boho	(Equatorial Guinea)	FW	30 August 1986 (aged 30)	Bristol Academy	2016			
15	Amber-Keegan Stobbs	(England)	FW	21 October 1992 (aged 24)	Washington Spirit	2016			
18	Helen Ward	(Wales)	FW	26 April 1986 (aged 30)	Chelsea	2013			
20	Melissa Fletcher	(Wales)	FW	28 January 1992 (aged 24)	Academy	2008			
Out on loan
1	Grace Moloney	(Republic of Ireland)	GK	1 March 1993 (aged 23)	Academy	2009		110	0
17	Charlie Estcourt	(Wales)	MF	27 May 1998 (aged 18)	Chelsea	2015			
Left during the season
8	Bonnie Horwood	(England)	MF	16 April 1987 (aged 29)	Notts County	2014			

== Transfers ==
=== In ===
Date	Position	Nationality	Name	From	Fee	Ref.
1 January 2016	MF	(England)	Kayleigh Hines	Oxford United	Undisclosed	
1 January 2016	FW	(England)	Amber-Keegan Stobbs	Washington Spirit	Undisclosed	
8 January 2016	FW	(Equatorial Guinea)	Jade Boho	Bristol Academy	Undisclosed	
19 February 2016	GK	(England)	Mary Earps	Bristol Academy	Undisclosed	
30 June 2016	MF	(England)	Remi Allen	Birmingham City	Undisclosed	
6 July 2016	DF	(Republic of Ireland)	Sophie Perry	Unattached	Free	

=== Out ===
Date	Position	Nationality	Name	To	Fee	Ref.
20 January 2016	DF	(England)	Ellie Wilson	Bristol City	Undisclosed	
30 June 2016	MF	(England)	Bonnie Horwood	Millwall Lionesses	Undisclosed	

=== Loans out ===
Start date	Position	Nationality	Name	To	End date	Ref.
30 June 2016	GK	(Republic of Ireland)	Grace Moloney	Aston Villa	End of season	
30 June 2016	MF	(Wales)	Charlie Estcourt	Bristol City	End of season	

=== Released ===
Date	Position	Nationality	Name	Joined	Date	Ref.
15 December 2016	DF	(England)	Shelly Cox	Notts County		
15 December 2016	MF	(England)	Amber-Keegan Stobbs	Everton		
15 December 2016	MF	(Republic of Ireland)	Lois Roche	Åland United		
15 December 2016	FW	(Equatorial Guinea)	Jade Boho	Madrid CFF		
15 December 2016	FW	(Wales)	Laura May Walkley	London Bees		
15 December 2016	FW	(Wales)	Helen Ward	Yeovil United		
19 December 2016	DF	(Wales)	Nia Jones	Yeovil United		
31 December 2016	DF	(Republic of Ireland)	Sophie Perry	Brighton & Hove Albion		

== Competitions ==
=== Overview ===
Competition	First match	Last match	Starting round	Final position	Record							
Competition	First match	Last match	Starting round	Final position	Pld	W	D	L	GF	GA	GD	Win %
WSL	23 March 2016	6 November 2016	Matchday 1	8th	16	1	6	9	15	26	−11	6.25
FA Cup	20 March 2016	3 April 2016	Fifth Round	Quarterfinal	2	1	0	1	2	3	−1	50.00
WSL Cup	2 July 2016	2 July 2016	First Round	First Round	1	0	0	1	1	3	−2	0.00
Total					19	2	6	11	18	32	−14	10.53

Last updated: 6 November 2016
Source: Competitions

=== Women's Super League ===
==== Results summary ====
Overall								Home						Away					
Pld	W	D	L	GF	GA	GD	Pts	W	D	L	GF	GA	GD	W	D	L	GF	GA	GD
16	1	6	9	15	26	−11	9	0	3	5	5	12	−7	1	3	4	10	14	−4

Last updated: 6 November 2016.
Source: See Results

==== Results by matchday ====
Matchday	1	2	3	4	5	6	7	8	9	10	11	12	13	14	15	16
Ground	A	A	A	H	H	A	A	H	H	H	A	H	H	A	A	H
Result	L	D	D	L	D	D	L	D	D	L	L	L	L	W	L	L

Updated to match(es) played on 6 November 2016. Source: See Results
A = Away; H = Home; W = Win; D = Draw; L = Loss

==== Results ====
23 March 2016 1	Arsenal	3–1	Reading	Borehamwood
19:45 GMT (UTC)	Janssen 34', 46'; Carter 70'	Report	Boho 58'	Stadium: Meadow Park; Referee: Rob Whitton

26 March 2016 2	Sunderland	1–1	Reading	Hetton-le-Hole
18:00 GMT (UTC)	Mead 46'	Report	Roche 41'	Stadium: Eppleton Colliery Welfare Ground; Referee: Glen Hart

24 April 2016 3	Notts County	2–2	Reading	Nottingham
17:00 BST (UTC+1)	Clarke 33', 65'	Report	Ward 7'; McGee 39'	Stadium: Meadow Lane; Referee: Anthony Tankard

27 April 2016 4	Reading	1–2	Arsenal	High Wycombe
19:45 BST (UTC+1)	Walkley (yellow card) 74'; Follis 79'	Report	Nobbs 30'; Janssen 60'	Stadium: Adams Park; Referee: Anthony Coggins

2 May 2016 5	Reading	1–1	Sunderland	High Wycombe
14:00 BST (UTC+1)	Ward 75' (pen.)	Report	Mead 9'; M.Beer (red card) 74'	Stadium: Adams Park; Referee: Joshua Smith

19 May 2016 6	Birmingham City	0–0	Reading	Solihull
19:45 BST (UTC+1)		Report	Hines (yellow card) 88'	Stadium: Damson Park; Referee: Wayne Barratt

9 July 2016 7	Liverpool	2–0	Reading	Widnes
17:30 BST (UTC+1)	Harding 17'; Coombs 24'	Report	McCarthy (yellow card) 34'; Stobbs (yellow card) 67'	Stadium: DCBL Stadium; Referee: Steven Copeland

24 July 2016 8	Reading	1–1	Birmingham City	High Wycombe
14:00 BST (UTC+1)	Fletcher 47'	Report	Linden 74' (yellow card) 90'	Stadium: Adams Park; Referee: Ashvin Degnarain

31 July 2016 9	Reading	1–1	Notts County	High Wycombe
14:00 BST (UTC+1)	Follis 65'	Report	Buet 40' (yellow card) 76'	Stadium: Adams Park; Referee: Paul Johnson

3 August 2016 10	Reading	1–2	Manchester City	High Wycombe
19:45 BST (UTC+1)	Bruton 89' (pen.)	Report	Christiansen 38'; Walsh (yellow card) 69'; Duggan 81'	Stadium: Adams Park; Referee: David Rock

28 August 2016 11	Manchester City	2–0	Reading	Manchester
12:15 BST (UTC+1)	Beattie 49'; Houghton 88'	Report		Stadium: Academy Stadium; Referee: Simeon Lucas

1 September 2016 12	Reading	0–1	Liverpool	High Wycombe
19:45 BST (UTC+1)		Report	Harding (yellow card) 57'; Zelem 87'	Stadium: Adams Park; Referee: Sian Massey

11 September 2016 13	Reading	0–3	Chelsea	High Wycombe
14:00 BST (UTC+1)	Allen (yellow card) 71'; Bruton (yellow card) 75'; Scott (yellow card) 90+3'	Report	Chapman 54'; Flaherty (yellow card) 90'; Davison 90+1'; Borges 90+5'	Stadium: Adams Park; Referee: Tim Donnellan

24 September 2016 14	Doncaster Belles	1–4	Reading	Doncaster
18:30 BST (UTC+1)	Barker (yellow card) 44'; Simpkins 46'	Report	Follis 9', 61'; Jones 37'; Rowe 84'	Stadium: Keepmoat Stadium; Referee: Gareth Mellor

30 October 2016 15	Chelsea	3–2	Reading	Staines-upon-Thames
18:00 GMT (UTC)	Aluko 20', 68'; Borges 56'	Report	Bruton 65' (pen.); McGee (yellow card) 76'; Fletcher 90+3'	Stadium: Wheatsheaf Park; Referee: Sunny Gill

6 November 2016 16	Reading	0–1	Doncaster Belles	High Wycombe
18:00 BST (UTC+1)	Allen (yellow card) 68'; Bruton (yellow card) 86'	Report	Simpkins (yellow card) 47'; Ómarsdóttir 69'	Stadium: Adams Park; Referee: Stephen Bates

==== League table ====
Pos	Team	Pld	W	D	L	GF	GA	GD	Pts	Qualification or relegation
1	Manchester City (C, Q)	16	13	3	0	36	4	+32	42	Qualification for the Champions League
2	Chelsea (Q)	16	12	1	3	42	17	+25	37	Qualification for the Champions League
3	Arsenal	16	10	2	4	33	14	+19	32	
4	Birmingham City	16	7	6	3	18	13	+5	27	
5	Liverpool	16	7	4	5	27	23	+4	25	
6	Notts County	16	4	4	8	16	26	−10	16	Club folded after end of season
7	Sunderland	16	2	4	10	17	41	−24	10	
8	Reading	16	1	6	9	15	26	−11	9	
9	Doncaster Rovers (R)	16	1	0	15	8	48	−40	3	Relegation to FA WSL 2

Source: FA WSL
Rules for classification: 1) Points; 2) Goal difference; 3) Number of goals scored
(C) Champions; (Q) Qualified for the phase indicated; (R) Relegated

=== FA Cup ===
20 March 2016 Fifth round	Reading	2–0	Millwall Lionesses	High Wycombe
14:00 GMT (UTC)	Boho; Follis	Report		Stadium: Adams Park

3 April 2016 Quarter-final	Sunderland	3–0	Reading	Hetton-le-Hole
14:00 BST (UTC+1)	Mead 35'; Williams 41'; Chaplen 90'; K.Johnston (yellow card); A.Holmes (yellow card)	Report		Stadium: Eppleton Colliery Welfare Ground; Attendance: 407; Referee: Shaun Hudson

=== WSL Cup ===
2 July 2016 First round	Reading	1–3	Arsenal	High Wycombe
17:00 GMT (UTC)	Follis 66'	Report	Losada 47'; Williams 50', 64'	Stadium: Adams Park

== Squad statistics ==
As of match played 6 November 2016

=== Appearances ===
No.	Pos	Nat	Player	Total		WSL		FA Cup		WSL Cup	
No.	Pos	Nat	Player	Apps	Goals	Apps	Goals	Apps	Goals	Apps	Goals
2	DF	(England) ENG	Becky Jane	16	0	15	0	0	0	1	0
3	DF	(England) ENG	Harriet Scott	8	0	6+1	0	0	0	0+1	0
4	MF	(England) ENG	Kayleigh Hines	16	0	12+3	0	0	0	1	0
5	DF	(England) ENG	Molly Bartrip	13	0	11+1	0	0	0	1	0
6	DF	(England) ENG	Kirsty McGee	17	1	16	1	0	0	1	0
7	MF	(England) ENG	Emma Follis	17	5	16	4	0	0	1	1
8	MF	(England) ENG	Remi Allen	9	0	7+2	0	0	0	0	0
9	FW	(England) ENG	Lauren Bruton	17	2	14+2	2	0	0	1	0
10	MF	(Republic of Ireland) IRL	Lois Roche	5	1	3+1	1	0	0	0+1	0
11	FW	(Equatorial Guinea) EQG	Jade Boho	9	1	8	1	0	0	1	0
12	DF	(Wales) WAL	Kylie McCarthy	7	0	6+1	0	0	0	0	0
13	DF	(Republic of Ireland) IRL	Sophie Perry	7	0	6+1	0	0	0	0	0
14	MF	(Wales) WAL	Laura May Walkley	6	0	1+5	0	0	0	0	0
15	FW	(England) ENG	Amber-Keegan Stobbs	9	0	4+4	0	0	0	0+1	0
16	DF	(England) ENG	Shelly Cox	5	0	4	0	0	0	1	0
18	FW	(Wales) WAL	Helen Ward	10	2	6+3	2	0	0	1	0
19	GK	(England) ENG	Mary Earps	13	0	12	0	0	0	1	0
20	FW	(Wales) WAL	Melissa Fletcher	12	2	7+5	2	0	0	0	0
22	DF	(Wales) WAL	Nia Jones	8	1	3+5	1	0	0	0	0
23	MF	(Wales) WAL	Rachel Rowe	17	1	15+1	1	0	0	1	0
	MF	(England) ENG	Zoe Cunningham	1	0	0+1	0	0	0	0	0
	MF	(England) ENG	Hannah Knapton	1	0	1	0	0	0	0	0
Players away from the club on loan:
1	GK	(Republic of Ireland) IRL	Grace Moloney	4	0	4	0	0	0	0	0
17	MF	(Wales) WAL	Charlie Estcourt	2	0	1+1	0	0	0	0	0
Players who appeared for Reading but left during the season:

=== Goal scorers ===
Place	Position	Nation	Number	Name	WSL	FA Cup	WSL Cup	Total
1	MF	(England)	7	Emma Follis	4	1	1	6
2	MF	(England)	9	Lauren Bruton	2	0	0	2
2	FW	(Wales)	18	Helen Ward	2	0	0	2
2	FW	(Wales)	20	Melissa Fletcher	2	0	0	2
2	FW	(Equatorial Guinea)	11	Jade Boho	1	1	0	2
6	DF	(England)	6	Kirsty McGee	1	0	0	1
6	MF	(Republic of Ireland)	10	Lois Roche	1	0	0	1
6	DF	(Wales)	22	Nia Jones	1	0	0	1
6	MF	(Wales)	23	Rachel Rowe	1	0	0	1
Total					15	2	1	18

=== Clean sheets ===
Place	Position	Nation	Number	Name	WSL	FA Cup	WSL Cup	Total
1	GK	(England)	19	Mary Earps	1	0	0	1
1	GK	(Republic of Ireland)	1	Grace Moloney	0	1	0	1
Total					1	1	0	2

=== Disciplinary record ===
Number	Nation	Position	Name	WSL		FA Cup		WSL Cup		Total	
Number	Nation	Position	Name	Booked	Sent off (straight red)	Booked	Sent off (straight red)	Booked	Sent off (straight red)	Booked	Sent off (straight red)
3	(Republic of Ireland)	DF	Harriet Scott	1	0	0	0	0	0	1	0
4	(England)	MF	Kayleigh Hines	1	0	0	0	0	0	1	0
6	(England)	DF	Kirsty McGee	1	0	0	0	0	0	1	0
8	(England)	MF	Remi Allen	2	0	0	0	0	0	2	0
9	(England)	FW	Lauren Bruton	2	0	0	0	0	0	2	0
12	(Wales)	DF	Kylie Davies	1	0	0	0	0	0	1	0
14	(Wales)	MF	Laura May Walkley	1	0	0	0	0	0	1	0
15	(England)	FW	Amber-Keegan Stobbs	1	0	0	0	0	0	1	0
Players away on loan:
Players who left Reading during the season:
Total				10	0	0	0	0	0	10	0
