= Kayleigh (given name) =

Feminine given name

Kayleigh is a feminine given name.

Notable people with the name include:

- Kayleigh Amstutz, known professionally as Chappell Roan (born 1998), American singer-songwriter
- Kayleigh Barton (born 1988), Welsh professional association footballer
- Kayleigh Chetcuti (fl. 2020), Maltese professional association footballer
- Kayleigh Cronin (born 1996), Australian rules footballer for Adelaide and Gaelic footballer for Dr Crokes and County Kerry
- Kayleigh Gilbert (fl. 2012), South African actress
- Kayleigh Goldsworthy (fl. 2005), American singer-songwriter
- Kayleigh Haggo (born 1999), Scottish boccia player, frame runner, and para swimmer
- Kayleigh Haywood (2000–2015), English teenager and murder victim
- Kayleigh Heckel (born 2006), American college basketballer for the UConn Huskies and USC Trojans
- Kayleigh Hines (born 1991), English association footballer for Peterborough United
- Kayleigh Kerr (born 1992), Scottish professional wrestler who performs under the ring name Alba Fyre
- Kayleigh McEnany (born 1988), American political commentator, media personality, and political spokesperson
- Kayleigh McKee (born 1994), American voice actress
- Kayleigh Morris (fl. 2017), contestant on series 2 of Ex on the Beach and Big Brother series 18
- Kayleigh O'Reilly (fl. 2009), Miss Earth 2009 finalist
- Kayleigh Pearson (born 1985), English model
- Kayleigh Powell (born 1999), Welsh rugby union player who plays for Harlequins Women
- Kayleigh Trappe (born 1995), Irish social media personality and television presenter
- Kayleigh van Dooren (born 1999), Dutch professional association footballer for AC Milan

== Fictional characters ==
- Kayleigh Gibbs, an Emmerdale character from 2005–2010
- Kayleigh Hudson, a character in the British mockumentary sitcom This Country
- Kayleigh Morton, a Coronation Street character introduced in 2007

== See also ==
- Caley (given name), a list of people with the given name
- Caley (surname), list of people with the surname
- Caylee (given name), list of people with the given name
- Kaley (disambiguation), a list of articles with the title
- Kaylee (disambiguation), list of people with the given name
- Kaleigh Rafter (born 1986), Canadian softball player
- Kayleigh (disambiguation), a list of articles with the title
- Kelleigh, list of people with the given name
