= Cayley (surname) =

Cayley is a surname. Notable people with the surname include:

- Arthur Cayley (1821–1895), British mathematician
- Beverley Cochrane Cayley (1898–1928), Canadian lawyer and mountaineer
- Charles Cayley (1823–1883), British linguist and friend of Christina Rossetti
- Cornelius Cayley (1727–1779), British religious writer and preacher
- David Cayley Canadian broadcaster and writer
- Dorothy Cayley (1874–1955), British mycologist
- Douglas Edward Cayley (1870–1951), British Army major-general, son of Henry Cayley, brother of Henry Priaulx Cayley and Walter Cayley
- Edward Cayley (1802–1862), British Member of Parliament
- Forde Everard de Wend Cayley (1915–2004), British physician held by the Japanese as a prisoner of war during the Second World War
- G. C. Cayley (1866–1944), senior Royal Navy and Royal Air Force officer
- George Cayley (1773–1857), English naturalist, physical scientist, engineer, inventor, politician, and pioneer of flight
- Henry Cayley (1834–1904), Deputy Surgeon-General and the British army in India, honorary surgeon to Queen Victoria and King Edward VII
- Henry Douglas Cayley (1904–1991), British banker
- Henry Priaulx Cayley (1877–1942), Royal Australian Navy rear admiral, son of Henry Cayley, brother of Douglas Edward Cayley and Walter Cayley
- Hugh Cayley (1857–1934), Canadian lawyer, journalist and politician
- John Cayley (1956–), Canadian writer, electronic writer and theorist
- Kate Cayley, Canadian writer and theatre director
- Michael Cayley (1842–1878), Quebec/Canadian lawyer and politician
- Neville Henry Cayley (1853–1903), Australian painter
- Neville William Cayley (1886–1950), Australian author, artist and amateur ornithologist
- Richard Cayley (1833–1908), British lawyer, 14th Chief Justice of Ceylon and 14th Queen's Advocate of Ceylon
- Richard Cayley (Royal Navy officer) (1907–1943), British Second World War submarine commander, son of Douglas Cayley
- Thomas Merritt Cayley (1878–1933), Canadian Member of Parliament
- Walter de Sausmarez Cayley (1863–1952), British Army major general, son of Henry Cayley, brother of Douglas Edward Cayley and Henry Priaulx Cayley
- William Cayley (disambiguation)
