= Kayle =

- Language: Yiddish, Irish?

Other names
- Variant forms: Yiddish: Keyle; Irish: Kale, Caile, Cayle, Cale, Kaile, Kail

Kayle is a surname, a Yiddish feminine given name, and a masculine given name. As a Yiddish name, Kayle (קילא KAY-leh) is known from the 13th century as a variant of Keyle, meaning "merry"; it is cognate with the modern German word geil.

Kayle (KAY-el) is also a variant of the masculine given name Kale, which may have originated as an Anglicisation of the Irish name Cathal, or as a masculine equivalent of Kaylee; other variants include Caile, Cayle, Cale, Kaile, and Kail.

The 2000 United States census found 104 people with the surname Kayle, making it the 146,011th-most-common name in the country. About nine-tenths of the bearers of the surname identified as non-Hispanic white, with small numbers identifying as Black or Asian, but none as Hispanic.

Notable people with the Yiddish name Kayle (קילא KAY-leh) include:

- Kayle, late Medieval super-commentator on Rashi

Notable people with the masculine name Kayle (KAY-el) include:

- Kayle Connor (born 1990), Australian rugby league player
- Kayle Kirby (born 1998), Australian rules footballer
- Kayle Leogrande (born 1977), American road racing cyclist
- Kayle Short (born 1973), Canadian ice hockey player
- Kayle van Zyl (born 1991), South African rugby union player

Notable people with the feminine name Kayle (KAY-lee) include:

- Kayle Browning (born 1992), American sport shooter
- Kayle Osborne (born 2002), Canadian ice hockey player

Notable people with the surname Kayle include:

- Hugh Kayle (died 1604), English goldsmith
- Kortney Wilson (born 1979), American country music singer who used the stage name Kortney Kayle for two single releases

== See also ==
- McKayle, a surname
- Kailey, a surname and given name
