= Cayley =

Cayley may refer to:

== People ==
- Cayley (surname)
- Cayley Illingworth (1759–1823), Anglican Archdeacon of Stow
- Cayley Mercer (born 1994), Canadian women's ice hockey player

== Places ==
- Cayley, Alberta, Canada, a hamlet
  - Cayley/A. J. Flying Ranch Airport
- Mount Cayley, a volcano in southwestern British Columbia, Canada
- Cayley Glacier, Graham Land, Antarctica
- Cayley (crater), a lunar crater

== Other uses ==
- Cayley baronets, a title in the Baronetage of England
- Cayley computer algebra system, designed to solve mathematical problems, particularly in group theory

== See also ==
- W. Cayley Hamilton (died 1891), Canadian barrister and politician
- Caylee (name), given name
- Cèilidh, traditional Scottish or Irish social gathering
- Kaylee, given name
- Kaley (disambiguation)
- Kayleigh (disambiguation)
