= Caoilfhionn =

Feminine given name

Caoilfhionn (/ˈkiːlɪn/ KEE-lin or /ˈkwiːlɪn/ KWEE-lin) is a feminine given name of Irish origin.

Notable people with the name include:

- Caoilfhionn Dunne (born 1984), Irish actress
- Caoilfhionn Gallagher, Irish lawyer
- Caoilfhionn Ní Bheacháin, Irish academic
- Caoilfhionn Nic Pháidín, Irish author and academic
- Caoilfhionn Rose (born 1993), English singer-songwriter
- Caoilfhionn Shanley-Ferguson, known professionally as Keelin Shanley (1968–2020), Irish journalist, newsreader and television presenter

== See also ==
- Callan (name), a list of people with the given name and surname
- Caoilainn (given name), a list of people with the given name
- Caolan (given name), a list of people with the given name
