= Kailey =

Other names
- Related names: Kaylee, Kayleigh, Kaley

Kailey (/keɪli/) is a modern English feminine first name. It is a spelling variant of Kaylee that became popular in the US following the release of the British rock group Marillion's song "Kayleigh" in 1985.

== People with the given name ==
- Kailey Harlen, Australian canoeist
- Kailey Leila, Canadian-born Guyanese footballer
- Kailey Willis, Maltese footballer

== People with the surname ==
- Maninder Kailey, Indian Punjabi songwriter
- Matt Kailey (1955–2014), transgender American writer and activist

== Fictional characters ==
- Kailey Hopkins, American Girl character

== See also ==
- Kaylee, a given name; includes Kayli
- Kayleigh (disambiguation); includes Kaliegh
- Kaley (disambiguation)
- Kaili (disambiguation)
