= Kellie Wilson =

Kellie Wilson may refer to:

- Kellie Wilson (gymnast)
- Kellie Wilson (model)

== See also ==
- Kelly Wilson (disambiguation)
