= Caoilainn =

Feminine given name

Caoilainn is a feminine given name of Irish origin, derived from the words "caol-" ("slender") and "-fionn" ("fair"). The name means "slender", "white", "fair", or "pure". Caoilainn originated as a name in the 6th century, concurrent with the Irish female saint, Saint Caolainn.

Notable people with the name include:

- Caoilinn Hughes (born 1985), Irish novelist and short story writer
- Caoilinn Springall (born 2013), Irish actress

== See also ==
- Caley (given name), a list of people with the given name
- Callan (name), a list of people with the given name and surname
- Caolan (given name), a list of people with the given name
- Caoilfhionn (given name), a list of people with the given name
