= Kayleigh (disambiguation) =

"Kayleigh" is a 1985 song by Marillion.

Kayleigh may also refer to:

== People ==
- Kayleigh (given name), a list of people with the given name
- Layla Kayleigh (born 1985), British-American television presenter, actress, and philanthropist

== See also ==
- Caley (given name), a list of people with the given name
- Caylee (given name), a list of people with the given name
- Cayley (disambiguation)
- Kaley (disambiguation)
- Kaylee (disambiguation)
- Cèilidh, traditional Scottish and Irish social gathering
