= William Cayley =

William Cayley may refer to:

- Sir William Cayley, 1st Baronet (1610–1681) of the Cayley baronets
- Sir William Cayley, 2nd Baronet (1635–c. 1708) of the Cayley baronets
- William Cayley (MP) (died 1768), MP for Dover
- William Cayley (Royal Navy officer) (1742–1801)
- William Cayley (Canadian politician) (1807–1890), Canadian politician and lawyer

== See also ==
- Cayley (disambiguation)
- William Calley
- William Cawley (disambiguation)
