= Dakers =

Dakers is a surname. Notable people with the surname include:

- Kaylee Dakers (born 1991), Canadian breaststroke swimmer
- Lionel Dakers (1924–2003), English cathedral organist

== See also ==
- Daker, another surname
