= Robert Potter (translator) =

English translator, poet, critic and pamphleteer (1721–1804)

Robert Potter M.A.
- Born: 1721; Podimore, Somerset
- Died: 9 August; Lowestoft
- Resting place: Lowestoft
- Education: Sherborne School, Emmanuel College, Cambridge
- Alma mater: Cambridge University
- Occupations: clergyman, translator and poet
- Spouse: Elizabeth Colman (d. 1786)
- Children: Nine children
- Writing career
- Period: 1737–1742

Robert Potter (1721 – 9 August 1804) was an English clergyman of the Church of England and a translator, poet, critic and pamphleteer. He established the convention of using blank verse for Greek hexameters and rhymed verse for choruses. His 1777 English version of the plays of Aeschylus was frequently reprinted and the only one available for the next 50 years.

== Life ==
Potter was born in Podimore, Somerset, the third son of John Potter (fl. 1676–1723), a prebendary of Wells Cathedral. He studied at Emmanuel College, Cambridge and graduated BA in 1742, when he was also ordained. He married the daughter of Rev. Colman of Hardingham, Norfolk. His children included a daughter, Sarah, referred to in a letter. Potter became curate of Reymerston and vicar of Melton Parva, but the combined emoluments of these were less than £50 a year. He later became curate of Scarning, Norfolk, as well as the master of the local Seckar's School from 1761 to 1789, but spent much of his time writing and translating.

Among Potter's pupils was Jacob Mountain (1749–1825), the first Anglican bishop of Quebec.

Until 1788, Potter struggled to support his family on his meagre stipends and support from aristocratic patrons. He was at last made financially secure when he was appointed a prebendary of Norwich Cathedral through the patronage of the Lord Chancellor, Lord Thurlow, who had attended Seckar's School. According to one account, Thurlow and Potter had been schoolfellows at Seckar's, which seems unlikely, as Potter was ten years his junior. For whatever reason, when Potter approached Thurlow to ask for a £10 subscription to his Sophocles translation, he received a valuable cathedral stall instead. This meant he could resign other offices and move to Norwich. In June 1789 Lewis Bagot, Bishop of Norwich, presented Potter with the valuable vicarage of the combined parishes of Lowestoft and Kessingland, Suffolk, and in 1790 he moved again to Lowestoft, where died on 9 August 1804 and was buried in the parish churchyard.

== Publications ==
Potter published in several different genres during his long career.

=== Poetry ===
Potter published Retirement: an epistle (1747), A farewell hymne to the country. Attempted in the manner of Spenser's Epithalamion (1749 and 1750), Holkham, a poem (1758), Kymber. A monody (1759), and his collected Poems by Mr. Potter (1774).

=== Sermons ===
Potter published three sermons. On the pretended inspiration of the Methodists (1758) was answered by Cornelius Cayley in "A letter to the Rev. Mr. Potter", which in turn occasioned "An appendix to the sermon on the pretended inspiration of the Methodists. Occasioned by Mr. Cayley's letter. By the reverend Mr. Potter". "A sermon preached before the Right Worshipful the Mayor of Norwich, and the corporation, in the cathedral, on Friday, April 19, 1793" attacked Thomas Paine's Rights of Man. The third was A sermon for the first day of June 1802, being the day appointed for a general thanksgiving for peace.

=== Political pamphlets ===
In 1768 Potter wrote "A letter to John Buxton, of Shadwell, Esq; on the contests relative to the ensuing election for the county of Norfolk", and in 1775 Observations on the poor laws, on the present state of the poor, and on House of Industry, criticising the cruel treatment of the rural poor.

=== Translations ===
Potter is best remembered for his annotated English translations of Greek tragedies in blank verse. He completed the plays of Æschylus (1777), Euripides (1781–1783) and Sophocles in (1788). that remained in print throughout the 19th century. Of the three, the Aeschylus was best known and went through seven editions up to 1892. Likewise his Euripides went through six editions up to 1906; the Sophocles was reprinted in 1808 and 1880. Potter's scheme of using blank verse for Greek hexameters and rhymed verse for the choruses was widely adopted by translators.

In 1779 Potter collaborated with the politician Hans Stanley to correct and annotate Stanley's translation of Pindar's Odes. The task was completed but never published due to Stanley's suicide in January 1780.

=== Literary criticism ===
After completing his Euripides, Potter set about an essay on lyric poetry using some notes prepared for the translation of Pindar, but incorporating a defence of the work of Thomas Gray after recent criticisms of it by Samuel Johnson in his Lives of the Most Eminent English Poets. Elizabeth Montagu persuaded him to convert the project into An inquiry into some passages in Dr. Johnson's Lives of the poets: particularly his observations on lyric poetry, and the odes of Gray. In 1789, after Johnson's death, Potter published The art of criticism; as exemplified in Dr. Johnson's lives of the most eminent English poets.

== Assessment ==
The antiquary Craven Ord found Potter "narrow in his circumstances with a disagreeable wife... rather an entertaining and well-behaved gentleman, with some singularities of thinking." A letter from Sarah Burney to her sister Frances Burney on 1 August 1779 states that Samuel Johnson, Hester Thrale and their circle thought little of Potter's poetic abilities. Johnson may have called Potter's poetry "verbiage", but Horace Walpole was welcoming: "There is a Mr. Potter too, I don't know who, that has published a translation of Aeschylus, and as far as I have looked is a good poet."

== Portraits ==
There is a 1789 portrait of Potter by George Romney (painter) and an etching in the National Portrait Gallery, London.

== External sources ==
- Potter's draft autobiography is present in the National Library of Wales, Ms 125021, Wigfair 21.
- Robert Potter at the Eighteenth-Century Poetry Archive (ECPA)
- An imitation of Spenser written by Potter is available at . Retrieved 16 May 2010.
- Potter's is one of the translations covered in Reuben A. Brower's "Seven Agamemnons", Mirror on Mirror: Translation, Imitation, Parody (Cambridge, MA: Harvard University Press, 1974) ISBN 0-674-57645-4.
