= Gallan =

Gallan is a surname. Notable people with the surname include:

- Grellan (died 624), also known as Gallan
- Pat Gallan (born 1965), British police officer
- José María Garza Gallán (1846–1902), Mexican politician
- Alex Allan (born 1951), British civil servant

== See also ==
- Callan
