= Richard Cayley (Royal Navy officer) =

British Royal Navy officer

- Born: 6 October 1907
- Died: 8 January 1943 (aged 35); Off Sardinia
- Military career
- Allegiance: United Kingdom
- Branch: Royal Navy
- Service years: 1926–1943
- Rank: Commander
- Nickname: "Deadeye Dick"
- Commands: HMS P311 (1942–43); HMS Utmost (1941–42); HMS Parthian (1940); HMS Sunfish (1937–38)
- Conflicts: Second World War
- Awards: Distinguished Service Order & Two Bars

Richard Douglas Cayley, DSO & Two Bars (6 October 1907 – 8 January 1943) was one of the most decorated British submariners of the Second World War. He was first awarded the Distinguished Service Order in 1941. His prowess earned him the nickname "Deadeye Dick".

== Family and personal life ==
Richard Cayley was the son of Major General Douglas Edward Cayley and nephew of Major General Sir Walter de Sausmarez Cayley. His grandfather was Henry Cayley, who served as a surgeon and physician with the British Army in India and as honorary surgeon to both Queen Victoria and King Edward VII.

In 1933 he married Nancy Coutts.

== Naval career ==
In 1926 Richard Cayley joined the Royal Navy as a midshipman. He was promoted to sub-lieutenant in 1929, lieutenant in 1931, lieutenant commander in 1939 and commander in 1942.

Most of his naval career was spent in submarine units. In the early years of the Second World War submarines under his command, particularly HMS Utmost, sank some 70,000 tons of enemy shipping, and attacked Italian cruisers, supply ships and troop transports, mainly in the Mediterranean. On one occasion 84 depth charges were dropped in a counter-attack, but HMS Utmost escaped undamaged. In June 1942 he took command of the submarine HMS P311. For his submarine service he was awarded the Distinguished Service Order with two Bars.

In March 1943 the presumed loss of HMS P311, with Richard Cayley on board, was announced. The wreckage was reported to have been discovered off Sardinia in 2016.
