= Caley =

Caley may refer to:

== People ==
- Caley (given name), list of people with the given name
- Caley (surname), list of people with the surname

== See also ==
- Caleys, department store in Windsor, England active from 1823–2006
- George Cayley (1773–1857), English engineer, inventor, and aviator
- Glasgow Caledonian University, public university formed in Scotland in 1993
