= Kaili =

Kaili may refer to:

== Place name ==
- Kaili City, city in Guizhou, China
  - The Kaili Formation, noted for its soft-bodied fossils

== Persons ==
- Kaylee, or Kaili, female given name
- Kaili Lukan (born 1994), Canadian rugby sevens player
- Kaili Närep (born 1970), Estonian actress
- Kaili Sirge (born 1983), Estonian cross-country skier
- Eva Kaili (born 1978), Greek politician

== Other ==
- Kaili people, an ethnic group of Sulawesi, Indonesia
- Kaili languages, a group of Austronesian languages spoken by the Kaili people
