= McKayle =

McKayle is a surname. Notable people with the surname include:

- Donald McKayle (1930–2018), American modern dancer
- Camille McKayle (born 1964), Jamaican-born American mathematician

== See also ==
- Kayle, also a surname
- John McKail (1810–1871), early settler of Western Australia
- Pop McKale (1887–1967), American football and baseball player
