= George Cayley (cricketer) =

English cricketer

Sir George Allanson Cayley, 8th Baronet (31 December 1831 – 10 October 1895) was a first-class cricketer for Cambridge University and Marylebone Cricket Club.

Cayley was born at Brompton, near Scarborough, North Yorkshire, where his family had lived and held a baronetcy since the 17th century. His grandfather, the 6th baronet – also named George Cayley (1773–1857) – was among other things an early pioneer of aeronautics. George Allanson Cayley was educated at Eton and Trinity College, Cambridge. In 1859 he married his first cousin, Catherine Louisa, daughter of Sir William Worsley, 1st Baronet, of Hovingham, 25 miles from Brompton. At some point he was an officer in the Yorkshire Hussars but only achieved the rank of Lieutenant. He stood for Parliament in the Ripon constituency in the 1868 general election but was defeated by the sitting MP, Lord John Hay. He was Registrar of Deeds for the North Riding of Yorkshire 1872–95. He succeeded to the baronetcy on the death of his father, the 7th baronet, in 1883. He died at Port Said, Egypt, in 1895.

Baronetage of England
Preceded by Digby Cayley	Baronet (of Brompton); 1883–1895	Succeeded by George Everard Arthur Cayley
