= Kelleigh =

Kelleigh is a feminine given name.

== People with the name ==
Notable people with the given name Kelleigh include:

- Kelleigh Bannen (born 1981), American country music singer
- Kelleigh Greenberg-Jephcott, American author
- Kelleigh Murphy, American politician
- Kelleigh Ryan (born 1987), Canadian fencer

== See also ==
- Kelly (given name)
- Kelley
- Kayleigh (given name)
