= Daker =

Daker is a surname. Notable people with the surname include:

- David Daker (born 1935), English actor
- Jon Daker, American amateur singer

== See also ==
- Dakers, another surname
