= Digby William David Cayley =

Sir Digby William David Cayley (born 3 June 1944) is 11th Baronet Cayley, of Brompton, Scarborough, Yorkshire, England.

He succeeded to the title of 11th Baronet Cayley on 27 December 1967. He is the son of Lt.-Cdr. William Arthur Seton Cayley and Natalie Maud Grey.

== Life ==
Cayley was educated at Malvern College, Worcestershire, and Downing College, Cambridge, where he read Classics and graduated with a BA and master's degrees. He also gained a PGCE from Cambridge in 1968.

He was assistant master at Portsmouth Grammar School in Hampshire from 1968 to 1973 and at Stonyhurst College in Blackburn, Lancashire from 1973 to 1981.

Between 1981 and 1989, he worked as an antique dealer in Cambridge, before becoming assistant master at Marlborough College, Wiltshire in 1989. After taking a post at Abingdon School, Oxfordshire in 1990, he returned to Marlborough College in 1994, as assistant master in classics, and stayed until 1997.

Cayley is a descendant of Sir George Cayley, 6th Baronet, a pioneer of aerodynamics and aeronautical engineering.

He represented Wiltshire County in Target Rifle competitions at Bisley.

Baronetage of England
Preceded by Kenelm Cayley	Baronet (of Brompton); 1967–Present	Incumbent
