= Douglas Edward Cayley =

British Army general (1870–1951)

Major-General Douglas Edward Cayley CB CMG
- Portrait by Walter Stoneman, 1919
- Born: 15 July 1870; India
- Died: 19 December 1951 (aged 81); Aldershot, Hampshire, England
- Military career
- Allegiance: United Kingdom
- Branch: British Army
- Service years: 1890–1920
- Rank: Major-General
- Unit: Worcestershire Regiment
- Commands: 29th Infantry Division; 88th Brigade; 4th Battalion, Worcestershire Regiment
- Conflicts: Second Boer War; First World War
- Awards: Companion of the Order of the Bath; Companion of the Order of St Michael and St George; Mentioned in Despatches; Order of the White Eagle, 3rd Class (Serbia); Order of the Crown (Belgium); Croix de guerre (Belgium); Croix de guerre (France)

Major-General Douglas Edward Cayley, CB, CMG (15 July 1870 – 19 December 1951) was a British Army officer of the First World War who played an important part in the evacuation of soldiers from Gallipoli.

== Family ==
Douglas Edward Cayley was a son of Henry Cayley, who served as a medical officer in the British army in India. Among his siblings were Major General Sir Walter de Sausmarez Cayley (1863–1952) and Rear Admiral Henry Priaulx Cayley (1877–1942).

His son Richard Douglas Cayley (1907–1943) was a distinguished submarine officer during the Second World War.

== Personal life ==
Douglas Edward Cayley was born in India, where his father was serving, on 15 July 1870. He was educated at Clifton College and the Royal Military College, Sandhurst.

In 1906 he married Jessie Eyre Duff Gibbon, daughter of Sir William Duff Gibbon, a tea planter in Ceylon.

== Military career ==
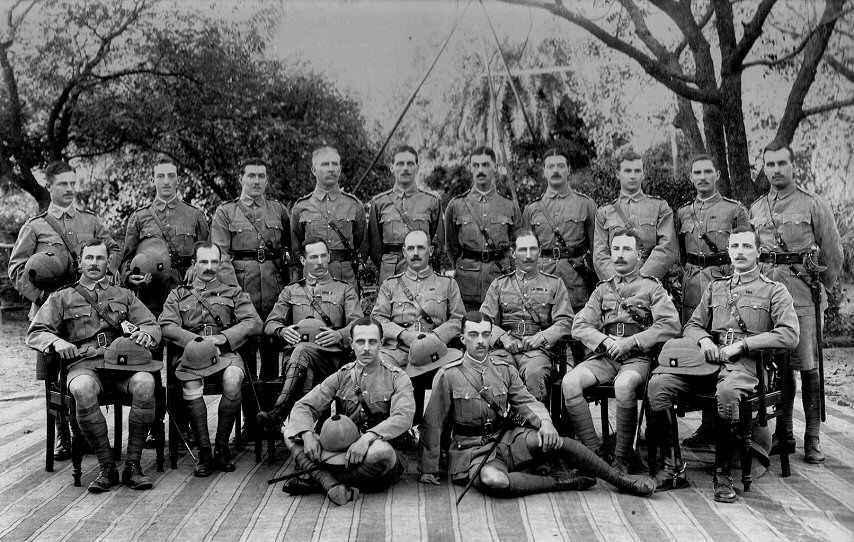
Officers of the 2nd Battalion, Worcestershire Regiment, at Jhansi, India, December 1911. Sat in the middle row, third from the left, is Major Douglas Edward Cayley.

Cayley enlisted in the Worcestershire Regiment as a second lieutenant on 1 March 1890. He was promoted to lieutenant on 20 February 1892, and to captain on 24 June 1899.

He served in the 1st Battalion of his regiment, which left for South Africa on board the Braemar Castle in March 1900 to serve in the Second Boer War. The battalion was based at Ladybrand.

Following the end of this war, he left South Africa on the SS Kildonan Castle, which arrived at Southampton in October 1902. For his service he received the Queen's medal with three clasps and the King's medal with two clasps.

In 1904 he was promoted to major, and, in April 1914, to lieutenant colonel, when he became commanding officer (CO) of the 4th Battalion, Worcestershire Regiment.

He was one of the few officers who served throughout the Gallipoli campaign. In June, as the campaign was being fought, he was promoted to the temporary rank of brigadier general and assumed command of the 29th Division's 88th Infantry Brigade. In July 1916 he led his brigade as the Battle of the Somme commenced and was promoted in January 1917 to brevet colonel as a reward "for distinguished service in the field". Later that year he was gassed during fighting near Monchy-le-Preux in April. He was gassed again in the Battle of Passchendaele later in the year. After recovering he took command of the 110th Infantry Brigade of the New Army's 21st Division in January 1918 but in March, the same month in which he was promoted to substantive colonel, he was given command of the 29th Division with the temporary rank of major general.

In 1919 he was made a Companion of the Order of the Bath (CB). For his army service during the war he was awarded the Order of the White Eagle of Serbia (3rd class with swords), the Croix de Guerre of France and Belgium and the Order of the Crown of Belgium.

== Later life ==
Cayley, upon giving up his rank of major general, reverted to temporary brigadier general and took command of a brigade, both of which he relinquished on 20 November 1919. He was then granted the honorary rank of major general and retired from the army with effect from the same date. He later settled in Hampshire.

During the Second World War he was senior air raid warden for the Yateley district. In 1947 he became a Life Governor of Clifton College. He died at Aldershot, Hampshire on 19 December 1951.

== Bibliography ==
- Maj A.F. Becke,History of the Great War: Order of Battle of Divisions, Part 1: The Regular British Divisions, London: HM Stationery Office, 1934/Uckfield: Naval & Military Press, 2007, ISBN 1-847347-38-X.
- Maj A.F. Becke,History of the Great War: Order of Battle of Divisions, Part 3a: New Army Divisions (9–26), London: HM Stationery Office, 1938/Uckfield: Naval & Military Press, 2007, ISBN 1-847347-41-X.
- Davies, Frank (1997). Bloody Red Tabs: General Officer Casualties of the Great War 1914–1918. London: Pen & Sword Books. ISBN 978-0-85052-463-5.
