= Henry Cayley =

British Army physician in colonial India (1834–1904)

Henry Cayley CMG FRCS
- Born: 20 December 1834
- Died: 19 March 1904 (aged 69)
- Military career
- Allegiance: United Kingdom
- Branch: Indian Medical Service; British Army
- Service years: 1857-1887; 1900
- Rank: Deputy Surgeon-General; Colonel
- Conflicts: Second Boer War
- Awards: Honorary Surgeon to Queen Victoria and to Edward VII; Companion of the Order of St Michael and St George

Henry Cayley (20 December 1834 – 19 March 1904) was a British medical doctor who was Deputy Surgeon-General in the British Army in India. He was appointed Professor of Military Medicine at the Army Medical School, Netley. He was Honorary Surgeon to Queen Victoria and King Edward VII.

== Early life and family ==
Cayley was born into a prominent family in Stamford, Lincolnshire, the fourth son of Edward Cayley (1782–1868), a Stamford banker, and Frances (née Twopeny).

In 1862, he married Letitia Mary Walters (1839–1920), daughter of the Rev. Nichols Walters. They had two daughters and six sons, including Sir Walter de Sausmarez Cayley and Douglas Edward Cayley, both of whom served as senior officers in the Gallipoli Campaign. His eldest daughter, Mary Louisa, married Sir Charles Campbell MacLeod and his younger daughter, Evelyn Wynn, married Maj.-Gen. Sir Hayward Reader Whitehead.

== Career in India ==
After studying medicine at King's College, London, Henry Cayley joined the Indian Medical Service in 1857 as an Assistant Surgeon. From 1858 to 1864 he was in charge of the 2nd Sikh Police Corps at Gorakhpur near the border with Nepal. From 1864 to 1866 he was Joint Civil Surgeon at Simla, the summer capital of British India. After holding the post of Civil Surgeon at Burdwan and then Howrah, he was appointed joint commissioner at Ladakh in 1867. The native government of Ladakh had accepted an army officer in the post only on condition that a medical officer was selected. Henry Cayley's duties there were both political and medical. In December 1867 a newspaper commented that "the reported assassination of Assistant-Surgeon H Cayley, the British representative at Ladak, was without foundation; and some very interesting notes by him respecting that remote region have just been published."

In 1870 he was a member of a British mission to Yarkand, where Ladakh had trading links.

His appointment ended in 1871, when he went on leave in England. There he extended his medical knowledge, particularly though studies in ophthalmology at Moorfields Eye Hospital. Shortly after his return to India, he was appointed Superintendent of the Eye Infirmary at Calcutta and Professor of Ophthalmic Surgery in Calcutta Medical College.

== England and South Africa ==
He left India permanently in 1884. In 1885, he was made a member of the Medical Board at the India Office and the War Office. He formally retired from the Bengal army in 1887.

In 1889 the Professor of Military Medicine at the army medical school at Netley Hospital fell ill, and Henry Cayley was invited to step in. He took over as Professor the next year, retiring in 1897. While at Netley his pastimes included sailing: his yacht Kathleen, moored there, was stolen in 1895 while he was away in Scotland.

In 1891, he was made Honorary Surgeon to Queen Victoria, and he retained this position when Edward VII came to the throne.

In 1893 he contributed a chapter on tropical liver diseases to Hygiene and Diseases of Warm Climates. In 1896 he wrote a pamphlet, Guide to Travellers on the maintenance of health in unhealthy countries.

On the outbreak of the Second Boer War he volunteered for service with the army. He was granted the temporary rank of colonel in April 1900, as he was sent out in charge of the Scottish National Hospital at Kroonstad in the Orange Free State. While there he suffered serious injuries as a result of a fall from his horse.

In 1900, he was made a Companion of the Order of St Michael and St George (CMG). He died on 19 March 1904 at Weybridge, Surrey.
