= Clan Kelly =

Scottish clan

- The coat of arms that Alexander Nisbet attributed to the Kellys of the Earldom of Kellie
- Motto: Turris Fortis Mihi Deus (God is a strong tower to me)
- no longer has a chief, and is an armigerous clan

Clan Kelly is a Scottish clan. The clan does not have a chief recognised by the Lord Lyon King of Arms, therefore the clan has no standing under Scots Law. Clan Kelly is considered an armigerous clan, meaning that it is considered to have had at one time a chief who possessed the chiefly arms, however no one at present is in possession of such arms. The only evidence for clan Kelly is a reference to Kelly of that ilk by Alexander Nisbet, who blazoned the arms or, a saltire sable between four fleurs-de-lis azure.

The surname Kelly has multiple different origins, with the name originating in England, Ireland and Scotland. In Ireland, the name originates from the name ‘O ceallaigh’ or ‘son of Ceallaigh’ with ceallaigh meaning ‘strife’ and due to the surname's popularity in Ulster as they ruled as the Kings of Uí Maine, has led to speculation that it is the same Kellys as in Scotland, due to the proximity of the Irish Province to Scotland and the Kellys being noted as having Celtic origins.

Alternative theories to the name's origin points to Kelloe, the name of two places, one in Durham, and another in Berwickshire, as well as Kellah, a place name in Northumberland. An early Scottish bearer of the name was William de Kellaw, who was bailiff to Alexander III in 1278. Another was Richard de Kellow, who is recorded in 1338 as a witness to a charter in Roxburghshire.

The modern spelling of Kelly originated around Fife and Agus with two minor holdings bearing the name, Kellie Castle and with John de Kelly being the Abbot of nearby Arbroath in 1373.

The Mackellies from Galloway and Wigtownshire are of celtic descent, and its of them that the attributed arms of a black saltire between four blue fleur de lis all on a gold field is awarded. They ruled the Earldom of Kellie, sworn to Clan Erskine.

== See also ==
- Kelly (surname), definitions of the various origins of the surname
