= Kaeli McEwen =

American content creator and social media influencer

- Born: 10 May 2000 (age 26)
- Occupations: Content creator, Social media influencer
- Years active: 2020–present

Kaeli Mae McEwen (born May 10, 2000), known professionally as Kaeli Mae, is an American content creator and social media influencer from Seattle, Washington, known for her TikTok videos about cleaning and organizing and contributing to the "Clean Girl" Internet aesthetic. She has Type 1 diabetes. Her fame was attributed to an increase in use of the name Kaeli for newborn girls in the United States in 2023.
