= Cornelius Cayley =

British religious writer and preacher

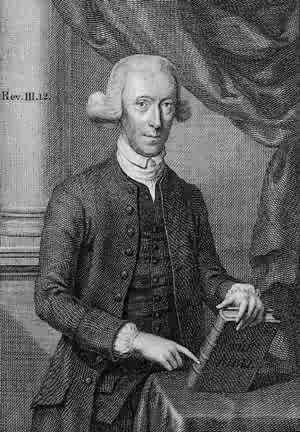
Cornelius Cayley

Cornelius Cayley (23 April 1727 – 1779) was a British religious writer and preacher.

== Family ==
He was a great-grandson of Sir William Cayley, the first of the Cayley baronets. His parents were Cornelius Cayley (1692-1779), a barrister who was involved in the prosecution of Jacobites after the Jacobite rising of 1715 and became Recorder of Hull, and Elizabeth Smelt (1695-1750).

== Life ==
At the age of 19 he became a clerk in the household of Frederick, Prince of Wales. Hoping for promotion to a diplomatic position, he took lessons in foreign languages, painting, dancing and music, but his application for the post of under-secretary to the British ambassador in Paris was unsuccessful. This was a major disappointment, and he sought consolation in the pleasure of London social life. This appears to have been a period when he lived beyond his means: in his 1779 Will, his father lamented that "the extravagance and ill conduct of my late son Cornelius has put it out of my power to make adequate provision for my daughters." Cornelius Cayley wrote in his autobiography The Riches of God's Grace that "these studies, with public diversions, dress and gaiety, took up all my thoughts, and so immersed my mind in pleasure, that religion was entirely neglected... very few persons in that great metropolis (London) pursued a larger round of pleasures than what I did," though he added that his sense of shame stopped him from breaking "out into open licentiousness." His parents urged him to go to church and take communion, but he resisted.

A religious crisis followed. Under the influence of James Hervey he started attending the Tabernacle at Moorfields. He had a frightening vision in which death vied for his soul. Soon after he went with one of his brothers to a ball, and his brother died within three days. He was devastated, and turned more and more to religion, but never finding in the official Anglican church the answers to his needs. In 1751 he heard George Whitefield preach and had a conversion experience. Soon after this he started preaching, both during his vacations and at other times. After the death that year of the Prince of Wales, he was kept on in the household of the Dowager Princess, Princess Augusta of Saxe-Gotha, but he was criticised for the periods he took off work for preaching, and eventually told to choose between preaching and retaining his post. He resigned his clerkship in 1757 and devoted himself full-time to his religious work. The first version of his autobiography appeared the following year.

In 1772 he toured Holland, Flanders and France: the Leeds Weekly Newspaper published in instalments his account of these travels: it was subsequently issued in book form. On his return to England he went to "his little retirement near Leeds", and probably spent his last years there.

The date of his death in uncertain: the wording of his father's will makes it clear that it was before his father died on 12 November 1779.

== Chief writings ==
- The Riches of God's Grace, Displayed in the Life and Conversion of Cornelius Cayley 1st edition 1757; 3rd, expanded, edition 1778
- The Seraphical Young Shepherd and a Small Bunch of Violets 1762
- The Amethyst; or some Beams of Eternal Light 1763
- The Day-Star of Glory rising in the Hearts of the Saints 1769
- The Olive Branch of Peace and the Shulamite: a poem 1771
- A Tour thorough Holland, Flanders, and part of France 1772
- An Evangelical Dialogue 1780

== Sources ==
- Stephen, Leslie, ed. (1887). "Cayley Cornelius" . Dictionary of National Biography. Vol. 9. London: Smith, Elder & Co.
- The Riches of God's Free Grace, Displayed in the Life and Conversion of Cornelius Cayley, 3rd Edition, 1778
