= Kylie McCarthy =

English-born Welsh footballer

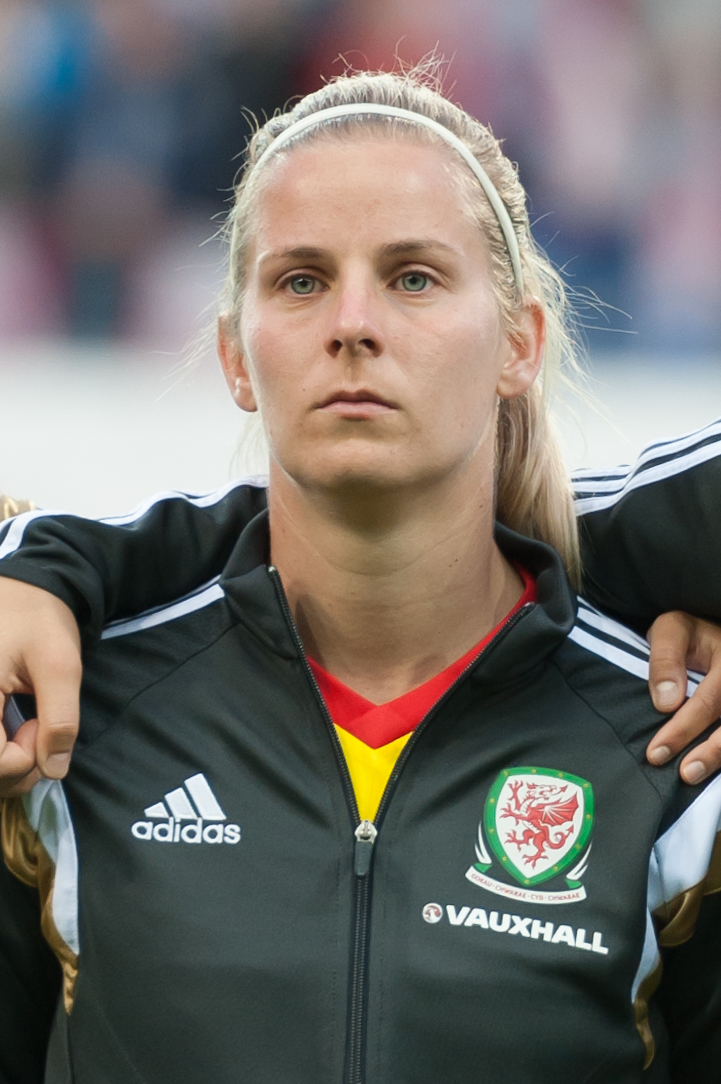

Personal information
- Date of birth: 25 September 1987 (age 39)
- Place of birth: Carshalton, England
- Height: 5 ft 4 in (1.63 m)
- Position: Defender

Team information
- Current team: Lewes L.F.C.

Youth career
- 1998–2003: Wimbledon Ladies

Senior career*
Years	Team	Apps	(Gls)
2003–2004	AFC Wimbledon Ladies		
2004–2006	Fulham Ladies		
2006–2013	Chelsea Ladies	28	(0)
2007	→ Richmond Kickers Destiny (loan)	5	(0)
2008	→ Richmond Kickers Destiny (loan)	4	(0)
2010	→ Colchester United Ladies (loan)		
2014	Millwall Lionesses		
2015–2017	Reading W.F.C.	7	(0)
2017–2018	Watford Ladies	4	(0)

International career^{‡}
2008	England U23		
2010–	Wales	35	(0)
- * Club domestic league appearances and goals ‡ National team caps and goals as of 22:53, 9 January 2014 (UTC)

Kylie McCarthy (née Davies; born 25 September 1987) is an English-born Welsh female international footballer. She plays as a centre back for FA Women's Championship club Lewes L.F.C. for whom she signed in September 2017, and has represented the Wales women's national football team at senior level.

== Club career ==
Davies began playing football at aged six, and joined the women's section of Wimbledon FC as a 10-year-old in 1998. In summer 2004, Davies was approached by Fulham. She decided to stay with AFC Wimbledon but changed her mind when approached again in September 2004. After two years at Fulham, Davies moved to Chelsea in 2006.

During the 2007 and 2008 off-seasons, Davies played in the American W-League for Richmond Kickers Destiny. With Chelsea dormant ahead of the 2011 FA WSL season, Davies featured for Colchester United Ladies.

When Casey Stoney left Chelsea for Lincoln Ladies, Davies inherited the Chelsea captaincy. She transferred from Chelsea to Millwall Lionesses in January 2014, following a brief loan spell.

== International career ==
Davies represented England at the Under-15, 17, 19, 21 and 23 levels. However, she was called into the Wales squad in March 2010 as her grandfather had been born in Pontardawe. Davies made her senior debut for Wales as a 90th-minute substitute, against Belgium that month.

Davies also represented Great Britain at the 2007 Summer Universiade in Bangkok, while a student at Loughborough University.

== Honours ==
Individual

- Welsh Footballer of the Year: 2015
