= Kayli Barker =

American racing driver

- Born: July 25, 1997 (age 28)
- Occupation: race car driver

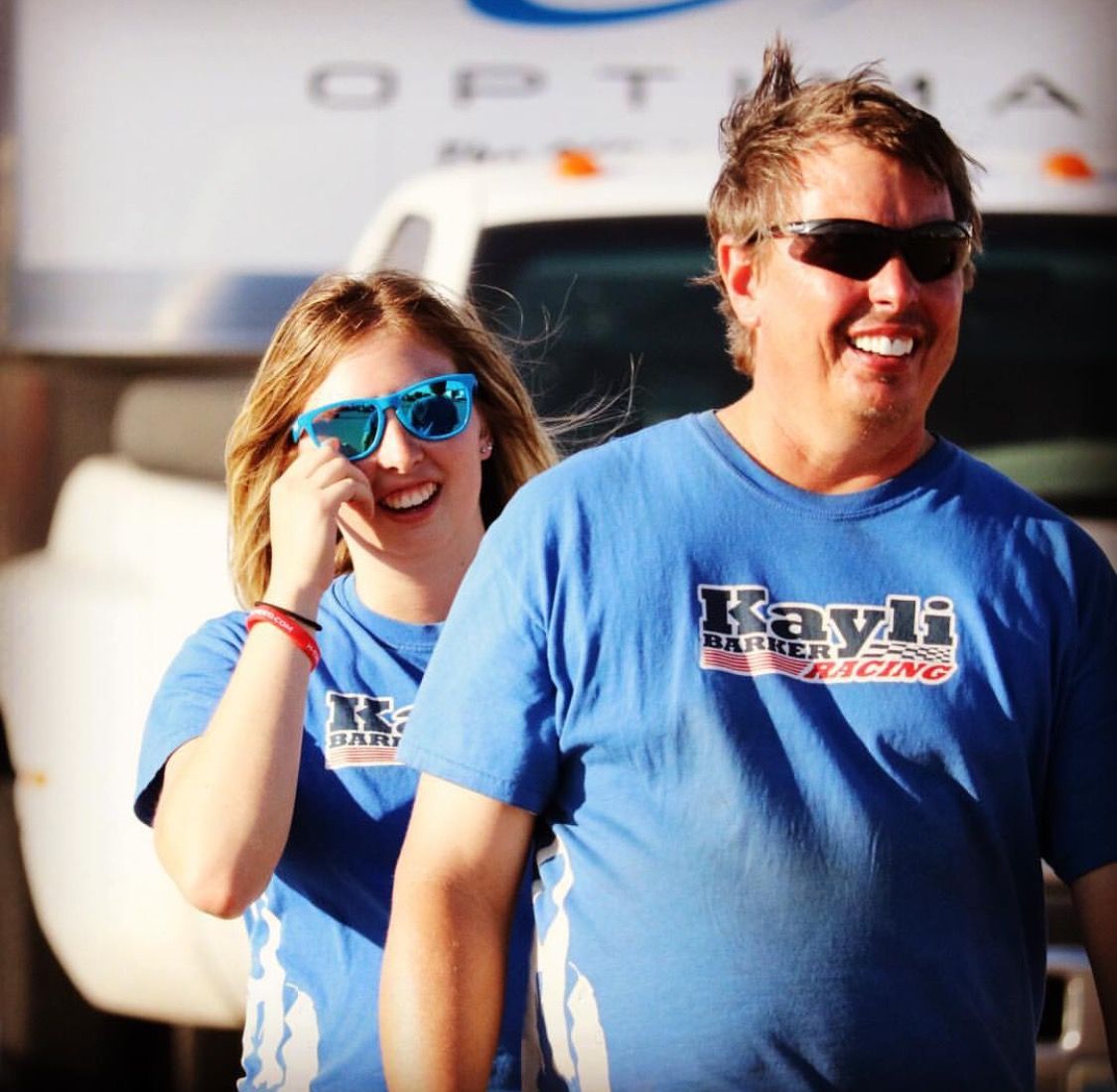
Barker at the Las Vegas Bullring in 2015

Kayli Barker (born July 25, 1997) is an American race car driver based in Las Vegas, Nevada. In October 2013 at the Bullring at the Las Vegas Motor Speedway, Barker became the first female champion of one of the track's three NASCAR classes. For the 2014 racing season, Barker joined the Sigma Racing team along with Jay Beasley and Donny St Ours, racing in the super late model division. Her crew chief for racing her super late model is Dana Stahl.

Barker is the daughter of Ron Barker who raced super stocks at the Las Vegas Motor Speedway. She is the spokesperson for Project 150, a Las Vegas nonprofit organization that helps local homeless, disadvantaged and displaced high school students stay in school and graduate.

== Racing titles ==
- 2013: First female to win a NASCAR championship at the Bullring at Las Vegas Speedway, wins Super Stock championship
- 2013: Rookie of the Year, Super Late Division
- 2012: New Record for Youngest Female to win NASCAR Whelen All-American Series Super Stock Division
- 2012: Bullring Spring Sizzler champion
- 2012: Rookie of the Year, Super Stock Division
- 2011: Finished 4th Las Vegas Motor Speedway Open Competition
- 2011: Qualified 10th out of 46 cars at the Street Stock Shootout at Orange Show Speedway
- 2011: Charger Division- Finished 9th, 5th, 7th, and 6th in Four Local Races
- 2011: 25 Wins- 18 in a row, 36 of 40 (top 3) 38 of 40 (top 5)
- 2011: 4th in National Points, Top Female
- 2011: 1st Female to Win Two Track Championships in Las Vegas History
- 2011: Las Vegas Motor Speedway Bullring Bandolero Outlaw Champion
- 2011: Nevada State Bandolero Outlaw Champion
- 2010: 3rd at Las Vegas Motor Speedway Bandolero Outlaw Division
- 2009: 11 wins, 31 out of 37 (3rd place), 36 of 37 (top 5)
- 2009: 10th in National Points, First Female to Reach Top 10
- 2009: Youngest Female Track Champion in Las Vegas History
- 2009: LVMS Bullring Bandolero Bandit Champion
- 2009: Nevada State Bandolero Bandit Champion
- 2008: 6th at Las Vegas Motor Speedway
- 2007: 7th at Las Vegas Motor Speedway
- 2006: 7th at Las Vegas Motor Speedway
- 2006: Nevada State Bandolero Bandit Champion
