= Caley Hall =

New Zealand artist

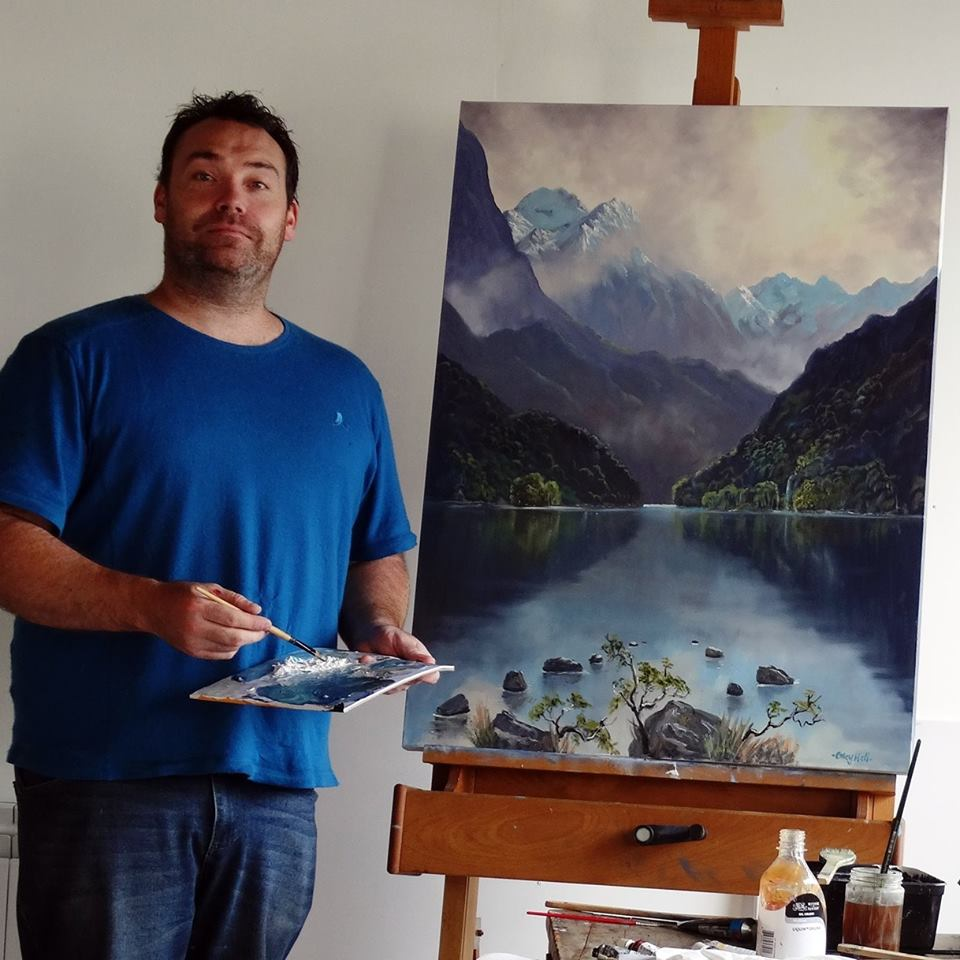
- Caley Hall at work in home studio
- Born: Caley Hall; December 22, 1975; Invercargill, New Zealand

Caley J. Hall (born 1975) is an artist from New Zealand who specializes in oil painting and is well known for his Fiordland landscapes and expressionist abstracts. A largely self-taught artist, he has learned techniques and takes inspiration from other New Zealand artists, including renowned Queenstown-based painter Tim Wilson, Canterbury wilderness artist Nathanael Provis and Central Otago-based painter Peter Beadle. He exhibited his large abstracts at the Peppers Bluewater Resort in Tekapo in 2012.

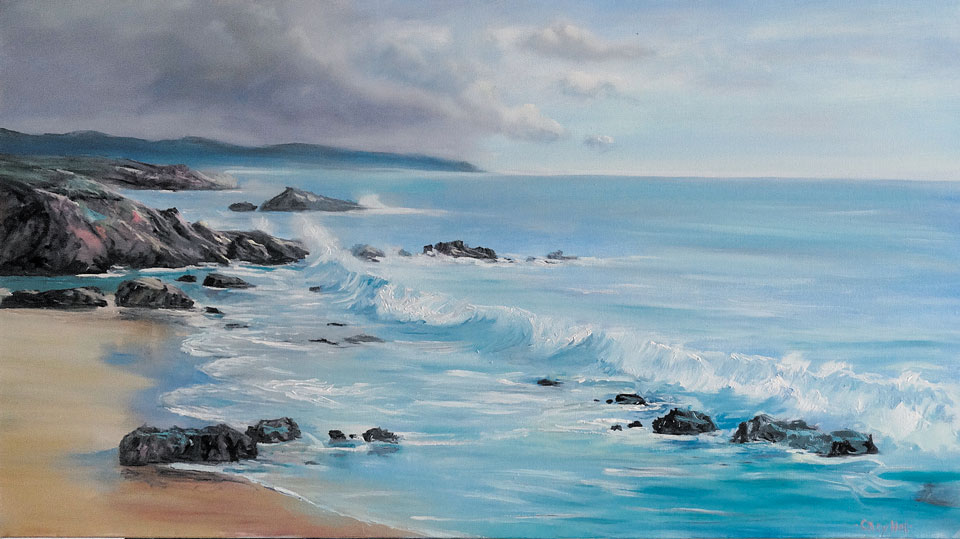
Painting a Seascape by Caley Hall, a New Zealand Landscape artist

Hall has written a book, “Jackson and the Plum Tree”, about his Highland cow Maggie and his Kunekune Jackson.

Hall has been featured in the New Zealand media numerous times, first in 1999 for giving then New Zealand Prime Minister Jenny Shipley a "cheeky" kiss on the cheek during a visit to the Earnslaw. Since then, he has been recognised for his contribution to communities in the region and internationally through fund raising, donations and art lessons.In November 2016, it was announced that he would be the first artist in residence on a new ship dedicated to international wildlife and marine conservation.

Hall's contributions to the community were formally recognised in 2018 and 2019 at the Kiwibank New Zealander of the Year Awards for making a difference in his community through charity work. The Fiordland Art Society present Caley Hall with an Honorary Life Membership in 2019 at the annual exhibition in Te Anau.

Caley Hall exhibited his largest 'work in progress' $120,0000 painting in 2019 which was reported on by the Ensign newspaper in Gore. He exhibited a collection of extremely large oil paintings which were mostly all still in the unfinished stage and the general public at the Mandeville Aviation Museum art exhibition were allowed to work on the huge master oils with him. The exhibition was called 'Southern Scenes'.
