= Kelly Wilson (disambiguation) =

Kelly Wilson (born 1985), is a female Australian basketball player

Kelly Wilson may also refer to:

- Kelly Schmedes (née Kelly Wilson, born 1983), American soccer player
- Kelly-Anne Wilson (born 1975), South African fencer
- Kelly Pace-Wilson (born 1973), American tennis player
- Kelly Wilson, of the Wilson sisters, New Zealand horse trainers

== See also ==
- Disappearance of Kelly Dae Wilson (born 1974), American female teenager who was last seen in 1992
