= Disappearance of Kelly Dae Wilson =

American teenager who went missing in 1992

Kelly Wilson
- Wilson at age 17
- Born: Kelly Dae Wilson; May 18, 1974; Gilmer, Texas, U.S.
- Disappeared: January 5, 1992 (aged 17)
- Status: Missing for 34 years, 9 months and 2 days
- Height: 5 ft 7 in (1.70 m)
- Parents: Robbie Wilson (father); Cathy Carlson (mother)

Kelly Dae Wilson (born May 18, 1974) was an American teenager who went missing on January 5, 1992, from Gilmer, Texas.

== Disappearance ==
Locations
1 Buffalo Street near Wilson's workplace.

Wilson was last seen at about 8:30 p.m. on January 5, 1992, as she was leaving her workplace to go to a nearby bank to deposit her paycheck, but she never returned home. The next morning her stepfather found her car at her workplace, and the tires had been slashed and were flat. Her belongings, including her purse, were inside the car, but her keys were missing. Wilson was last seen wearing a purple rugby shirt with red, gold and white insignia and white cuffs and collar, with stonewashed cutoff blue jeans with brown loafers, and she was wearing an assortment of rings.

== Investigation and aftermath ==
The Wilson disappearance remains unsolved. A man named Michael Biby was eventually arrested as a suspect in the tire-slashing incident, but was considered to be not linked to Wilson's disappearance. Wilson's boyfriend at the time, Chris Denton, was named by police as a prime suspect in her disappearance, but he was never charged in the case; Denton died of cancer in 2004. In 1994, Sergeant James Brown, along with seven other individuals were indicted by a grand jury, but the case was dismissed. Some of the defendants were found to be guilty of sexually abusing their own children.

== See also ==
- List of people who disappeared mysteriously (2000–present)
