= Kelly Bennett =

Zimbabwean cricketer (born 1971)

Personal information
- Full name: Kelly Bryan Bennett
- Born: 21 May 1971 (age 55); Salisbury, Rhodesia
- Batting: Right-handed
- Bowling: Right-arm off break

Domestic team information
- Years: Team
- 1995/96: Young Mashonaland

Career statistics
Competition	FC
Matches	3
Runs scored	61
Batting average	10.16
100s/50s	0/0
Top score	20
Catches/stumpings	1/–
- Source: ESPNcricinfo, 20 July 2021

Kelly Bryan Bennett (born 21 May 1971) is a former Zimbabwean cricketer. Born in Salisbury (now Harare), he played three first-class matches for Young Mashonaland during the 1995–96 Logan Cup.
