= Kayle (exegete) =

Medieval Jewish exegete

Kayle (Yiddish or Hebrew: קֵילְא, pronounced /keɪlə/) was a Biblical exegete who super-commentated on Rashi.

She lived in the late Middle Ages in Germany. Kayle is the only woman known to have composed a Hebrew super-commentary, and demonstrates "learning and intricacy" with a "deft reading of Rashi".

== Work ==
Four of her comments survive in MS Zurich Heid. 26 (f. 22r, 28r, 41r), copied in Ljubljana in 1515 and containing a collection of super-commentaries on Rashi.

- Gen. 28:10, And Jacob left Beersheba. Rashi explains that Jacob left because Isaac had hated the women of Canaan, but "Kayle answered, it was because Rebecca had said, 'I hate my life . . . if Jacob takes one of these women, why should I live?' and because Esau had left for Ishmael (Gen. 28:9)".
- Gen. 28:15, What I said to you. Rashi explains that this means "what I said concerning you" but "Kayle answered, if so, it would have been in the present tense".
- Gen. 33:10, And you have shown me favor. Rashi explains that Esau had "appeased" Jacob. Kayle says that Rashi did not mean to imply that Esau had done anything wrong.
- Gen 45:24, Do not argue on the way. Rashi gave "Another explanation: do not take long steps, and enter the city by day" but "Kayle answered: do not take long steps because they say (Taanit 10b, Berakhot 43b) that long steps weaken the eyesight".

== Date ==
Many of the other comments in the collection appear to date to the time of Yaakov Levi Moelin (1365–1427). Kayle is given an honorific for the dead, suggesting that she had died by 1515, and possibly by 1434, which year is given by MS Zurich's scribe as the date of the manuscript which had served as his source.

== Name ==
William Henry Lowe (1848–1917) speculates that the medieval Jewish name "Kayle" is a corruption of Gayle, from Abigail. Ephraim Zalman Margolioth (1762–1828) and others argue that Kayle is Germanic, possibly a corruption of Gayle but deriving from geil, meaning "happy".
