= Kelly Metcalfe =

Canadian cancer researcher and professor

Academic background
- Education: BScN, University of Western Ontario; PhD, 2002, University of Toronto
- Thesis: Prophylactic bilateral mastectomy in Ontario (2002)

Kelly A. Metcalfe is a Canadian scientist and a professor at the University of Toronto and at Women's College Hospital. Her work's focus is on understanding the clinical and psychosocial implications of genetic testing for BRCA gene mutations in women, men and their families.

== Early life and education ==
Growing up in Ontario, Metcalfe graduated from St. Joseph's Catholic High School in 1990 and went on to earn her nursing (BscN) degree at the University of Western Ontario. While completing her undergraduate degree, Metcalfe became interested in cancer research after the discovery of the BRCA1 (BReast CAncer one) and BRCA2 genes in 1994 and 1995 respectively. As such, she accepted a research nurse position at Women's College Hospital (WCH) where she became one of the first nurses to study the impact of genetic predispositions to cancer. While researching at WCH, she also completed her PhD in medical science in 2002 at the University of Toronto (U of T).

== Career ==
Upon earning her PhD, Metcalfe returned to WCH and accepted a faculty position at U of T. In 2004, she led a research team in surveying half of 120 women in Ontario who had preventive double mastectomies between 1991 and 2000. Between 2007 and 2011, Metcalfe received funding to help researchers understand the differences in uptake of cancer prevention options in Canadian women with a BRCA1 or BRCA2 mutation. Through this, Metcalfe became the first to investigate the predictors of contralateral breast cancer in women with a BRCA1 or BRCA2 mutations. As such, she received another grant in 2012 while working as U of T's Bloomberg Nursing interim director of research to develop and test a decision support tool for post-mastectomy breast reconstruction.

At the same time, Metcalfe was appointed the Lawrence S. Bloomberg Faculty of Nursing Limited-Term Professor in Cancer Genetics and became an Adjunct Scientist at the Familial Breast Cancer Research Institute at the Women’s College Research Institute. In these roles, she continued to focus on the prevention and treatment of breast and ovarian cancers in high-risk women by collaborating with the Canadian Breast Cancer Foundation and the Canadian Institutes of Health Research. Through these partnerships, she aimed to interview 1200 women with young-onset breast cancer to evaluate the contributions of 25 known breast cancer-causing genes in that population. Metcalfe was subsequently elected an International Fellow of the American Academy of Nursing in 2016. Following her election, Metcalfe was recognized locally with an election to the Royal Society of Canada’s College of New Scholars, Artists and Scientists and was named a Fellow of Canadian Academy of Health Sciences. She also received U of T's Rising Star Alumni Award. That same year, Metcalfe received another grant to fund her study, Breast cancer treatment in women with PALB2 mutations.

In 2018, Metcalfe was appointed Acting Associate Dean, Research & External Affairs for a one year term while Linda McGillis Hall was on administrative leave. Following her one year term, Metcalfe became the co-Principal investigator on a project entitled "Outcomes Associated with Direct Rapid Genetic Testing at Time of Breast Cancer Diagnosis." Her integral role in "investigating the clinical and psychosocial implications of genetic testing for BRCA mutations in women and men" subsequently earned her the Wendy Lack Women of Action Scientific Award. She was also listed among the top 25 nurse researchers in Canada.

== Awards ==
- Fellow, Canadian Academic of Health Sciences (2017)
- Rising Star Award, University of Toronto Faculty of Medicine (2017)
- Member, College of the Royal Society of Canada (2017)
- Scholarship into Practice Award, Council of Ontario University Programs in Nursing (2016)
- Fellow of the American Academy of Nursing (2016)
- Outstanding Paper Award, Women’s College Research Institute (2015)
- Award for Excellence in Nursing Research, Canadian Association of Schools of Nursing (2014)
- Excellence in Cancer Prevention and Early Detection Award, the Oncology Nursing Society (2008)
