= Caolán =

Masculine given name of Irish origin

Caolán (Irish pronunciation: [ˈkiːlˠaːnˠ, ˈkeː-]) is a masculine given name of Irish origin, derived from the Irish word "caol-" ("slender, narrow [and] fine"). The name has a number of Anglicisations, including "Kelan", "Keelan" and "Kealan".

Notable people with the name Caolán, Kelan, and Keelan include:

== Caolán ==
- Caolan Boyd-Munce (born 2000), Irish footballer
- Caolan Lavery (born 1992), Canadian-Northern Irish footballer
- Caolan McAleer (born 1993), Irish footballer
- Caolan McColgan (born 2002/2003), Gaelic footballer
- Caolan Mooney (born 1993), Gaelic and Australian rules footballer
- Caolan Robertson (born, ~1996) Irish-born journalist
- Caolan Ward (born 1992), Gaelic footballer

== Keelan ==
=== As forename ===
- Keelan Cole (born 1993), American footballer
- Keelan Doss (born 1996), American footballer
- Keelan Giles (born 1997), Welsh rugby union player
- Keelan Harvick (born 2012) American cart racer
- Keelan Johnson (born 1989), Canadian footballer
- Keelan Lebon (born 1997), French footballer
- Keelan Molloy (born 1998), Irish hurler
- Keelan O'Connell (born 1999), English association footballer
- Keelan Sexton (born 1997), Gaelic footballer
- Keelan White (born 2001), Canadian football player
- Keelan Williams, Welsh footballer and brother of Neco Williams

== See also ==
- Callan (name), a list of people with the given name and surname
- Caoilfhionn (given name), a list of people with the given name
- Keelin Shanley (1968–2020), journalist, newsreader and RTÉ presenter
