= Caley (surname) =

Caley is a surname.

Notable people with the surname include:

- Braeden Caley, Canadian politician
- Earle R. Caley (1900–1984), American chemist
- George Caley (1770–1829), English botanist and explorer of Australia
- John Caley (1760–1834), English archivist and antiquarian

== See also ==
- Caley (given name), a list of people with the given name
- Caley (disambiguation), a list of articles with the title
- Cale (name), a list of people with the given name and surname
