= Lois Roche =

Association football player (born 1993)

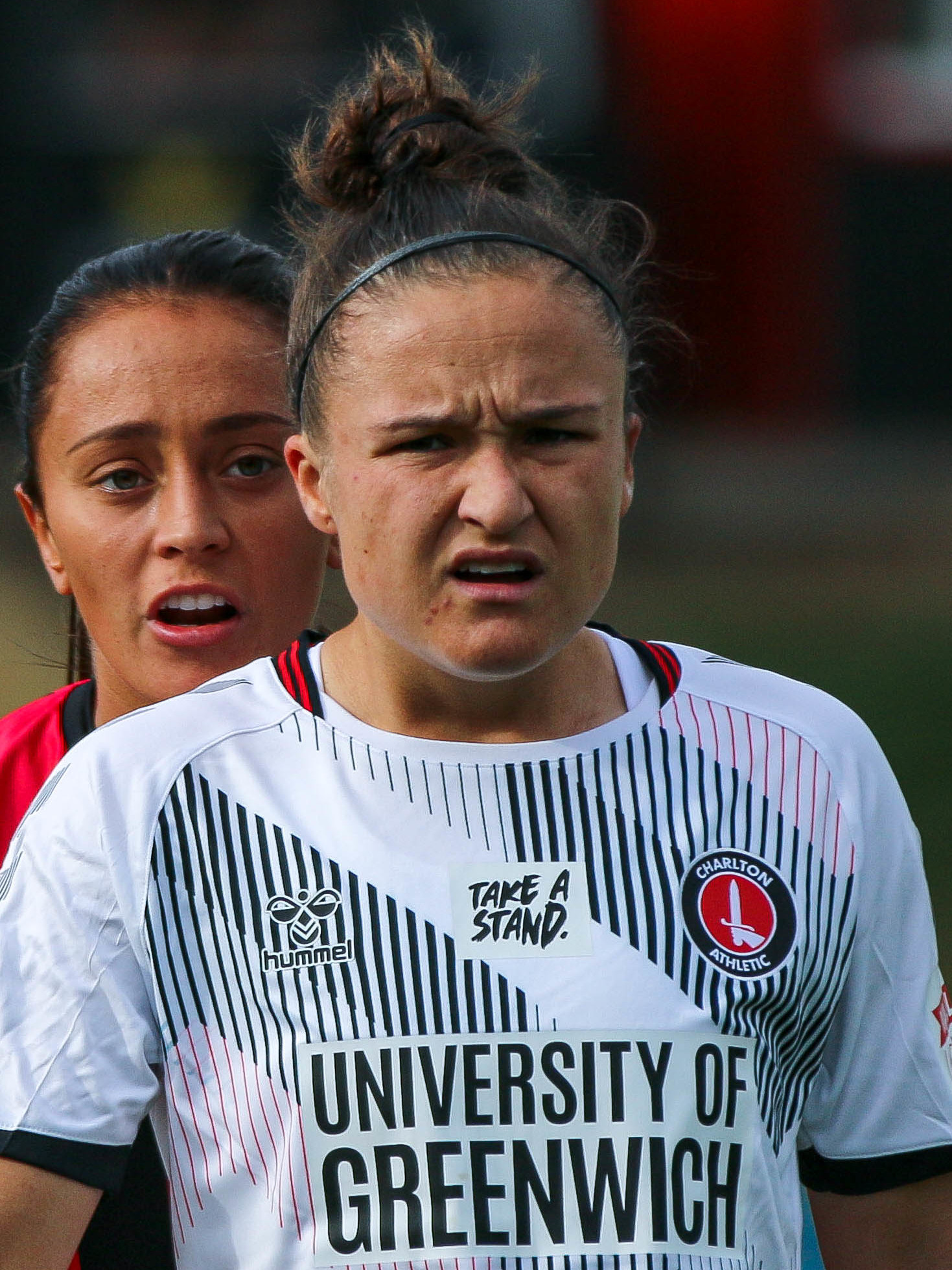
- Roche in 2021 in Charlton Athletic

Personal information
- Full name: Lois Jade Roche
- Date of birth: 18 June 1993 (age 33)
- Place of birth: London, England
- Height: 1.68 m (5 ft 6 in)
- Position: Midfielder

Team information
- Current team: Lewes
- Number: 18

Youth career
- Arsenal
- Chelsea
- Queen's Park Rangers

Senior career*
Years	Team	Apps	(Gls)
2012–2016	Reading	67	(14)
2017	Åland United	22	(5)
2018–2020	CF Florentia	23	(1)
2020	Røa IL	4	(0)
2021–2023	Charlton Athletic	33	(1)
2023–	Lewes	30	(5)

International career
2010	Republic of Ireland U17	11	
2011–2012	Republic of Ireland U19	10	
- * Club domestic league appearances and goals as of 19 August 2025

Lois Jade Roche (born 18 June 1993) is a former footballer who played as a midfielder for FA Women's National League South club Lewes. Born in England, she represented the Republic of Ireland internationally at youth level.

== Early life ==
Roche was born and raised in England but chose to play for the Republic of Ireland at youth international level. She played as a youth for Arsenal, Chelsea and Queens Park Rangers.

== Career ==
She became a player for Reading in 2012, where she played for four years, scoring fourteen goals in 67 matches. In 2017, she took the opportunity to play in a foreign league for the first time, joining Finnish Naisten Liiga club Åland United.

At the end of the season she decided to move to Italy, to play for Florentia, who were currently at the top of the Serie B table, in the second part of their 2017–18 season.

In September 2020 she made her debut in Norway for Røa IL.

Roche joined Charlton Athletic in 2021. At the end of her contract, she joined Lewes in 2023.
