= Caoilfhionn Ní Bheacháin =

Irish academic

Caoilfhionn Ní Bheacháin (also known as Caoilfhionn Vaughan) is an Irish academic.

== Biography ==
Ní Bheacháin is a faculty member and lecturer in Communications at Kemmy Business School, University of Limerick. She studied at Trinity College Dublin and NUI Galway. Her research has covered cultural history of the Irish Free State, media and business communication, marketing and ethics.
