= Henry Douglas Cayley =

Henry Douglas Cayley, OBE, (20 January 1904 – 31 March 1991) was a British banker born in Bombay. He joined the National Bank of India Limited in London in 1922, transferring to its eastern staff in 1926. He was Deputy Exchange Controller, Reserve Bank of India, 1939–48, and rejoined National Bank of India in 1948. He was appointed to their London head office in 1952, rising to become Chief General Manager 1964–69 and Director 1966–72, National & Grindlays Bank Ltd.

In 1940 he married Nora Innes Paton (1909–2011).
