= Kaylie Kaitschuck =

American contemporary textile and fiber artist

- Born: 1995 (age 30–31); Dearborn, Michigan, United States
- Citizenship: American
- Education: College for Creative Studies; Cranbrook Academy of Art
- Known for: Textile art

Kaylie Kaitschuck (born 1995) is an American contemporary textile and fiber artist whose work centers on machine embroidery and mixed fiber techniques. Her practice explores memory, emotion, and narrative through densely layered, map‑like compositions. Kaitschuck has exhibited internationally in solo and group exhibitions in the United States, Europe, and Asia.

== Early life and education ==
Kaylie Kaitschuck was born in Dearborn, Michigan, United States. She earned a Bachelor of Fine Arts (BFA) in Fiber and Textile Design from the College for Creative Studies in Detroit in 2018. She later completed a Master of Fine Arts (MFA) in Fiber at the Cranbrook Academy of Art in Bloomfield Hills, Michigan, graduating in 2021.

== Career ==
Kaitschuck's artistic practice is grounded in the use of machine embroidery as a drawing tool. Working primarily with thread and felt, she produces complex compositions that often resemble fragmented maps or visual diaries. Her work frequently incorporates references to personal experience, popular culture, and imagined environments, resulting in scenes that combine narrative elements with abstract structure.

She has presented solo and two‑person exhibitions at venues including Gaa Projects (Cologne, Germany), Hiromart Gallery (Tokyo, Japan), Goldfinch Gallery (Chicago), and Playground Detroit (Detroit). Her work has also been shown in group exhibitions and art fairs such as NADA New York, SCOPE Miami, and exhibitions associated with Library Street Collective and Cranbrook Art Museum.

== Style and themes ==
Critics and curators have described Kaitschuck's work as a hybrid of storytelling and cartography, where embroidery functions as a method of recording psychological and emotional states. Her compositions often juxtapose recognizable symbols with surreal or dreamlike imagery, blurring distinctions between reality and imagination. The dense accumulation of stitched marks has been interpreted as a reflection on memory, anxiety, and the nonlinear nature of personal experience.

== Recognition ==
Kaitschuck's work has been featured in juried art publications, including New American Paintings (Midwest and MFA Editions). She has received several awards and grants, such as support from the Detroit Artist Talent Fund, a Red Bull House of Arts Microgrant, and the Robert C. Larson Art, Design, and Architecture Venture Award.
