= Kellie Wilson (model) =

American model

- Born: Eleanor Charlienne Wilson; June 2, 1942; Washington, D.C., United States
- Died: September 14, 1973 (aged 31)
- Occupation: Model
- Years active: 1964–1973
- Spouse: Bob Mayo
- Modeling information
- Height: 1.72m or 5"7ft
- Hair color: Black
- Agency: Dorian Leigh (Paris)

Kellie Wilson (1942 - September 1973) was an American model who worked in the 1960s and early 1970s.

== Biography ==
Wilson was born to American parents in 1942 in Washington, DC and was raised by her mother Eleanor Wilson in Hawaii, Michigan, and Chicago between 1942 and 1963. She studied Psychology at the University of Chicago and fashion design at Chicago Art Institute. In 1964 she moved to New York City to pursue a career in the fashion industry, moving to Paris and later London.

In 1970 she married her English partner, Bob Mayo in Amsterdam. She was diagnosed with cancer in the same year and successfully underwent treatment returning to work the same year. Diagnosed again in 1973, she eventually died of cancer in September that year.

== Modelling career ==
Wilson was spotted in New York by the French photographer Jeanloup Sieff and eventually moved to Paris and signed with the Dorian Leigh agency. Wilson in her early modelling career 'worked her own combination of print-magazine editorials, catalogs, and advertisements - and runway - showroom, shows and department stores- to support herself.' Wilson eventually moved to London and resided in Chelsea. She was known to model for Paco Rabanne, Pierre Cardin, Nina Ricci and Andre Courreges. In 1966, she modelled for Rabanne's debut show, '12 unwearable dresses'.

There she would earn the nickname Kellie, for her personal style, which incorporated a large amount of the shade 'Kellie Green'. She was then shot by Richard Avedon, Clive Arrowsmith, Bert Stern and Brian Duffy. There she met and befriended fellow model Donyale Luna. She also worked for the popular London designers Jean Muir, Mary Quant and Ossie Clark and appeared in Vogue UK, the Sunday edition of the Daily Telegraph and Ebony. In 1966, she covered the Telegraph supplement cover in a yellow Jean Patou cape-dress and in the fashion editorial a Yves Saint Laurent quilted floral coat for the Telegraph, shot by Tom Kublin. In November 1966, she was shot in a purple satin set for Quant. In 1967 she modelled for the Apple Boutique in London with Pattie Boyd for Vogue UK, shot by Ronald Traeger and for Bert Stern for Vogue UK in 1969 in a Gres blue and yellow bathing suit and Emanuel Ungaro bubble cape.
