= Amber-Keegan Stobbs =

English footballer (born 1992)

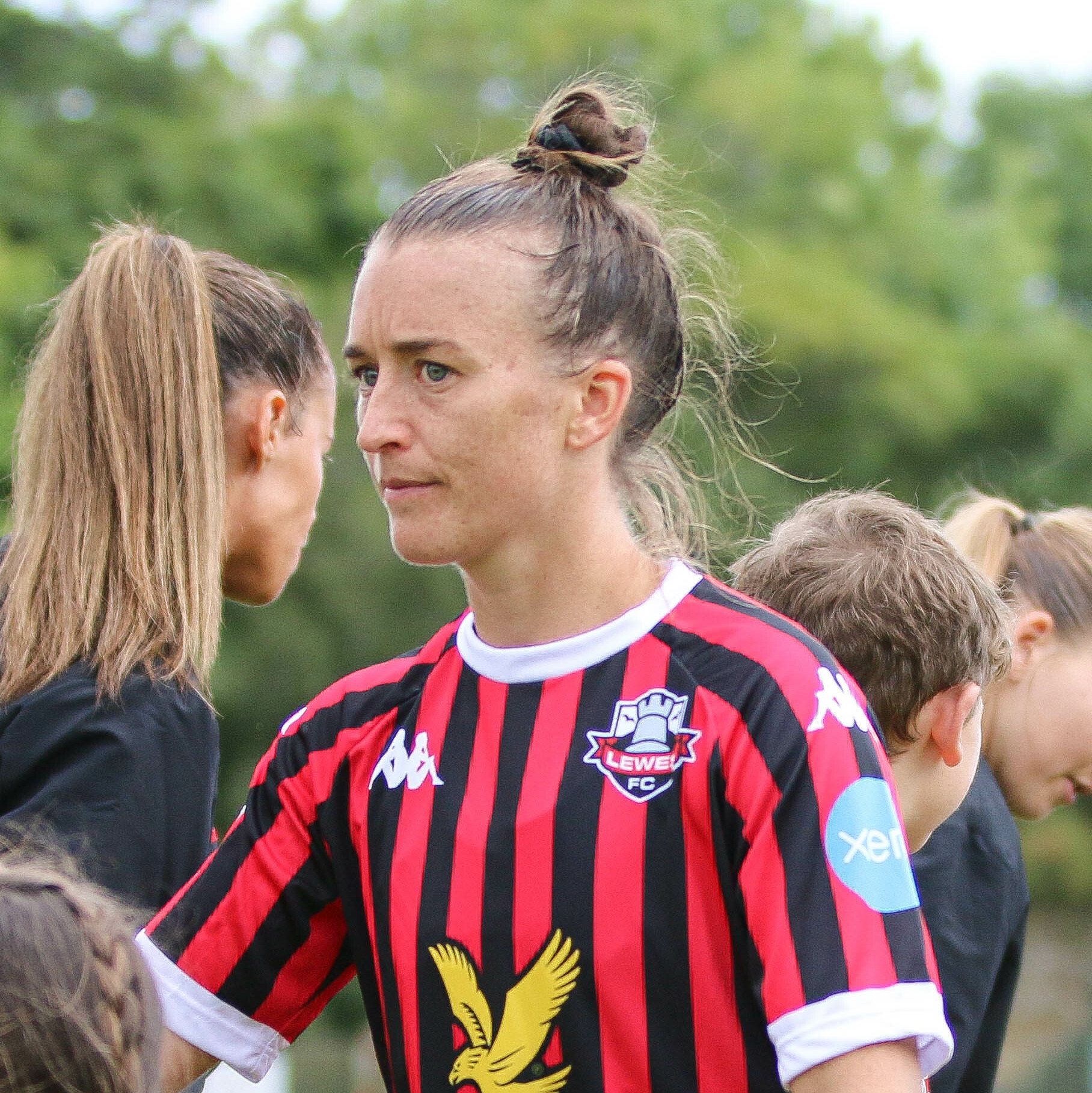
- Playing for Lewes FC in 2022

Personal information
- Full name: Amber Keegan Stobbs
- Date of birth: 21 October 1992 (age 34)
- Place of birth: London, England
- Height: 5 ft 3 in (1.60 m)
- Positions: Midfielder; forward

Team information
- Current team: Durham W.F.C.
- Number: 21

Youth career
- Chelsea
- Arsenal

College career
| Years | Team | Apps | (Gls) |
| 2010–2014 | Hofstra Pride | 66 | (9) |

Senior career*
| Years | Team | Apps | (Gls) |
| 2014–2015 | Washington Spirit | | |
| 2016 | Reading | 8 | (0) |
| 2017 | Everton | 5 | (0) |
| 2017–2018 | West Ham United | 6 | (1) |
| 2018–2019 | Charlton Athletic | 18 | (1) |
| 2019–2021 | Crystal Palace | 18 | (2) |
| 2021–2022 | Watford | 20 | (0) |
| 2022–2023 | Lewes | 13 | (1) |
| 2023–2025 | Newcastle United | 0 | (0) |
| 2025- | Durham W.F.C. | | |
- * Club domestic league appearances and goals as of 00:40, 19 March 2023 (UTC)

Amber-Keegan Stobbs (born 21 October 1992) is an English professional footballer who plays as a forward and midfielder for Women's Super League 2 club Durham W.F.C.

== Playing career ==
=== Youth and college ===
Stobbs started playing football at age six. After attending Warlingham School she joined Arsenal Women before moving on to Chelsea Ladies while in school. In 2010, she traveled to the United States and enrolled at Hofstra University, playing football for the Hofstra Pride for five seasons. During her time at university, she registered 66 appearances, scoring nine goals, and thirteen assists.

==== Washington Spirit ====
During her time at Hofstra, Stobbs previously played for Washington Spirit Reserves in the American USL W-League where she helped the team win the national championship in 2015.

=== Senior Club ===
==== Reading ====
In December 2015, Stobbs signed with Reading F.C. of the FA WSL 1. Reading would struggle during the 2016 season, with Stobbs earning 8 appearances.

==== Everton ====
In February 2017, Stobbs signed with Everton who were competing in the FA WSL 2 ahead of the FA WSL Spring Series. Later that month, she made her debut for the Toffees in the 8–1 win over Brighouse Town in the FA Women's Cup. Everton would go on to win the Spring Series, with Stobbs registering five appearances.

==== West Ham United ====
Ahead of the 2017–18 season, Stobbs joined West Ham United competing in the FA Women's Premier League Southern Division.

==== Watford ====
Stobbs made twenty appearances for Watford.

==== Lewes ====
She joined Lewes FC in July 2022, making 13 appearances for the club.

==== Newcastle United ====
Stobbs moved to Newcastle United in July 2023. She served as captain for the club's first season in the Women's Championship.

==== Durham ====
On 6 July 2025, it was announced that Stobbs had joined Durham, with her being unveiled at Finchale Priory.

== Personal life ==
Stobbs is the director of Equal Focus Football, which works with and develops girls' football and opportunities within local neighbourhoods and supports equity in sport.

Stobbs has a Bachelor's degree in Psychology from Hofstra University.

Stobbs is named after Newcastle United former player and Manager, Kevin Keegan.
