= Walter de Sausmarez Cayley =

British Army general (1863–1952)

Major-General Sir Walter de Sausmarez Cayley KCMG CB DL
- Born: 8 August 1863
- Died: 21 July 1952 (aged 88); Crowthorne, Berkshire
- Burial place: Crowthorne, Berkshire
- Military career
- Allegiance: United Kingdom
- Branch: British Army
- Service years: 1883–1920
- Rank: Major-General
- Unit: West Yorkshire Regiment
- Commands: 39th Infantry Brigade; 13th (Western) Division
- Conflicts: Fourth Anglo-Ashanti War; Second Boer War; North-West Frontier; First World War
- Awards: Knight Commander of the Order of St Michael and St George; Companion of the Order of the Bath; Mentioned in Despatches; Commander of the Order of Karađorđe's Star (Serbia)

Major-General Sir Walter de Sausmarez Cayley, KCMG, CB, DL (8 August 1863 – 21 July 1952) was a British Army officer who served in Africa towards the end of the 19th century, and later in Mesopotomia and Gallipoli during the First World War.

== Family and early life ==
Walter de Sausmarez Cayley was the eldest son of Henry Cayley, Deputy Surgeon-General with the Bengal Army and honorary surgeon to Queen Victoria and King Edward VII. Among his siblings were Douglas Edward Cayley, who also served with distinction in the Gallipoli Campaign, and Henry Priaulx Cayley, a naval officer who rose to the rank of rear admiral in the Royal Australian Navy. He was born in India in 1863 and baptised at Gorakhpur.

He was educated at Marlborough College and the Royal Military College, Sandhurst.

In 1896 he married Constance Blakeney (1870 to 1966), daughter of the Revd. Richard Paul Blakeney, Rector of Bridlington and a Canon of York Minster.

== Military career ==
In March 1883 he was commissioned as a lieutenant into the West Yorkshire Regiment and was promoted to captain in May 1890.

He served in the Ashanti campaign (1895–1896) in what is now Ghana, which led to the annexation of Ashanti territory by Britain. In October 1896 he became adjutant of the 1st (Volunteer) Battalion of his regiment.

For his part in the Second Boer War he received the Queen's South Africa Medal with three clasps. In 1901 he reached the rank of major. He was subsequently posted to India, taking part in operations on the North-West Frontier in 1908.

He was promoted to lieutenant colonel in March 1910 and took command of a battalion of his regiment and in June 1913 was promoted again, to colonel. After commanding the battalion for four years he was placed on half-pay.

Later that year, with the outbreak of World War I, he assumed command of the 39th Infantry Brigade with the temporary rank of brigadier general, to which he had been promoted in August 1914, and went with the brigade to Gallipoli. Several months after the withdrawal of Allied forces from l Gallipoli he was promoted to temporary major general in August 1916 and took part in the Mesopotamian campaign as commander of the 13th (Western) Division, and remained there until the end of the First World War. He was made a Companion of the Order of the Bath and Companion of the Order of St Michael and St George in 1916, and a Knight Commander of the Order of St Michael and St George in 1917. For his services in the First World War, he was also awarded Serbia's Order of Karađorđe's Star. His major general's rank became substantive in June 1918.

== Later life ==
Sir Walter de Sausmarez Cayley retired from the army in April 1920.

In his last decades he lived at Crowthorne, Berkshire, and in 1939 he was deputy lieutenant of Berkshire.
