= Laura May Walkley =

Welsh footballer (born 1991)

Personal information
- Date of birth: 19 May 1991 (age 35)
- Place of birth: Neath, Wales
- Height: 5 ft 0 in (1.52 m)
- Position: Attacking midfielder

Team information
- Current team: Briton Ferry Llansawel Ladies

Youth career
- Arsenal

Senior career*
Years	Team	Apps	(Gls)
2010–2012	Swansea City		
2012–2013	Cardiff Met.		
2013	Bristol Academy	0	(0)
2013–2014	Cardiff Met.	0	(0)
2014–2017	Reading	29	(0)
2017	London Bees	1	(0)
2017–	Watford Ladies	2	(0)

International career^{‡}
2011–	Wales	22	(0)
- * Club domestic league appearances and goals as of 13:36, 8 February 2017 (UTC) ‡ National team caps and goals as of 13:36, 8 February 2017 (UTC)

Laura May Walkley (born 19 May 1991) is a footballer who plays as a midfielder for the Wales national team. She made her debut for Wales in March 2011 against Chile.
