= Caley (given name) =

Unisex given name

Caley is a unisex given name of Irish origin, derived from the Gaelic name Caoilainn. The name means "slim" and "fair".

Notable people with the name include:

- Caley Chelios (born 1993), American ice hockey reporter, studio analyst, and radio color commentator
- Caley Hall (born 1975), New Zealand painter
- Caley McGinty (born 2000), English professional golfer
- Caley Reece (born 1979), Australian Muay Thai kickboxer

== See also ==
- Caley (surname), list of people with the surname
- Cale (name), list of people with the given name and surname
- Caylee (given name), list of people with the given name
- Kaley (disambiguation), list of articles with the name
- Kaylee (disambiguation), list of people with the given name
- Kayleigh (given name), list of people with the given name
