= Kelly Pace =

Kelly Pace may refer to:

- Kelly Pace (tennis) (born 1973), American tennis player
- Kelly Pace (footballer) (born 1991), Maltese footballer
