= Kelly-Anne =

Kelly-Anne is a given name. Notable people with the name include:

- Kelly-Ann Baptiste (born 1986), Tobagonian track and field sprint athlete
- Kelly-Anne Billingy (born 1986), Trinidad and Tobago female volleyball player
- Kellyanne Conway (born 1967) American political consultant
- Kellyanne Farquhar, Scottish television actress
- Kelly-Anne Lyons (born 1985), American actress
- Kelly-Ann Nadeau (born 1998), Canadian ice hockey player
- Kelly Anne Shepherd (born 1970), Australian botanist
- Kelly-Anne Smith (born 1979), English radio personality and voice actress
- Kelly-Ann Way (born 1964) Canadian retired track cyclist and road bicycle racer
- Kelly-Anne Wilson (born 1975), South African fencer.
- Kelly-Ann Woodland (born 1981), Scottish newsreader and journalist
