= Caoilfhionn Nic Pháidín =

Irish author and academic

Dr. Caoilfhionn Nic Pháidín is an author and academic, previously of Dublin City University, Dublin, Ireland. She served on the government agency Coimisiún na Gaeltachta (the Gaeltacht Commission) from 2000 to 2002. She is also a co-founder of the Irish language publishing firm Cois Life.

== Education and career ==
Nic Pháidín has an M.A. and Ph.D. in Irish from University College Dublin. She has held editing and research positions at An Gúm, Comhar, the Department of Education, The Irish Times, and the Royal Irish Academy. She was the director of Fiontar, an Irish language school in Dublin City University, from 1996 to 2006 and a senior lecturer in the school until 2015. She has been an Irish language consultant for the Oxford English Dictionary since 1985. She is also series editor of the monograph series Lúb ar Phár. Her research interests include the development of Gaeltachts (Irish speaking areas) in Ireland, the contemporary development of the Irish language, and twentieth century print media.

In 1995, Nic Pháidín co-founded Cois Life, an Irish language academic and literary publisher, along with Seán Ó Cearnaigh. She is currently the co-director of Cois Life. Cois Life receives funding from the Arts Council of Ireland and Clár na Leabhar Gaeilge.

Nic Pháidín was a member of Coimisiún na Gaeltachta from 2000 to 2002. Coimisiún na Gaeltachta was a government agency appointed to provide recommendations on how to strengthen the role of Irish in Gaeltacht communities.

== Publications ==
Books by Nic Pháidín include:

- Caoilfhionn Nic Pháidín. "Lessons from Gaelic-Medium Higher Education in Scotland". In Caoilfhionn Nic Pháidín and Donla Uí Bhraonáin (ed.). Ollscolaíocht Ghaeilge: Dúshláin agus Léargais - Páipéir Chomhdhála / University Education in Irish: Challenges and Perspectives, Fiontar, Dublin City University, 2004. pp. 43–51.
- Caoilfhionn Nic Pháidín (2004). Foclóir Fiontar/Dictionary of Terminology. Gaeilge-Béarla/English-Irish. Fiontar, DCU. ISBN 1-872327-42-7.
- Caoilfhionn Nic Pháidín (1999). Dinnseanchas na mBlascaodaí. Cois Life. ISBN 1-901176-13-4.
- Caoilfhionn Nic Pháidín (1998). Fáinne an Lae agus an Athbheochan (1898-1900). Cois Life. ISBN 1-901176-09-6.
- Caoilfhionn Nic Pháidín (1996). Cnuasach Focal ó Uibh Rathach. Royal Irish Academy. ISBN 0-901714-57-7.
- Caoilfhionn Nic Pháidín, ed. (1992). An Chaint sa tSraidbhaile. Comhar. ISBN 0-9518056-0-6.

As editor:

- Caoilfhionn Nic Pháidín (ed.) (2016) Séanna. Cois Life. ISBN 978-1-907494-64-2.
- Caoilfhionn Nic Pháidín, Seán Ó Cearnaigh (2008) (eds.) A New View of the Irish Language. Cois Life. ISBN 978-1-901176-82-7.
- Caoilfhionn Nic Phaidín (ed.) (1996) Séanna. Cois Life. ISBN 9781901176056.
