= Caylee =

Caylee is a feminine given name of unknown origin.

Notable people with the name include:

- Caylee Anthony (2005–2008), American toddler and murder victim
- Caylee Cowan (born 1998), American actress and executive producer
- Caylee Hammack (born 1994), American country music singer-songwriter
- Caylee Turner, ring name of Christina Crawford (born 1988), American professional wrestler
- Caylee Watson (born 1994), American swimmer from the Virgin Islands

== See also ==
- Caley (given name), a list of people with the given name
- Carlee (given name), a list of people with the given name
- Cayley (surname), a list of people with the surname
- Kaylee (given name), a list of people with the given name
- Kayleigh (given name), a list of people with the given name
- Kayla (name), a list of people with the given name
