= Kaley =

Kaley may refer to:

== People ==
=== Given name ===
- Kaley Cuoco (born 1985), American actress
- Kaley Doyle (born 2001), American professional ice hockey goaltender
- Kaley Fountain (born 1988), American association footballer
- Kaley Nolz (born 1995/1996), American politician

=== Surname ===
- John R. Kaley (1918–2005), American businessman and politician

== Places ==
- Kaley, Iran (also known as Kalley), village in Kermanshah Province

== See also ==
- Caley (given name), a list of people with the given name
- Caylee (name), a list of people with the given name
- Cayley (disambiguation)
- Kalay, Sagaing Region, Myanmar
- Kayleigh (disambiguation)
