= Kayleigh Pearson =

English model

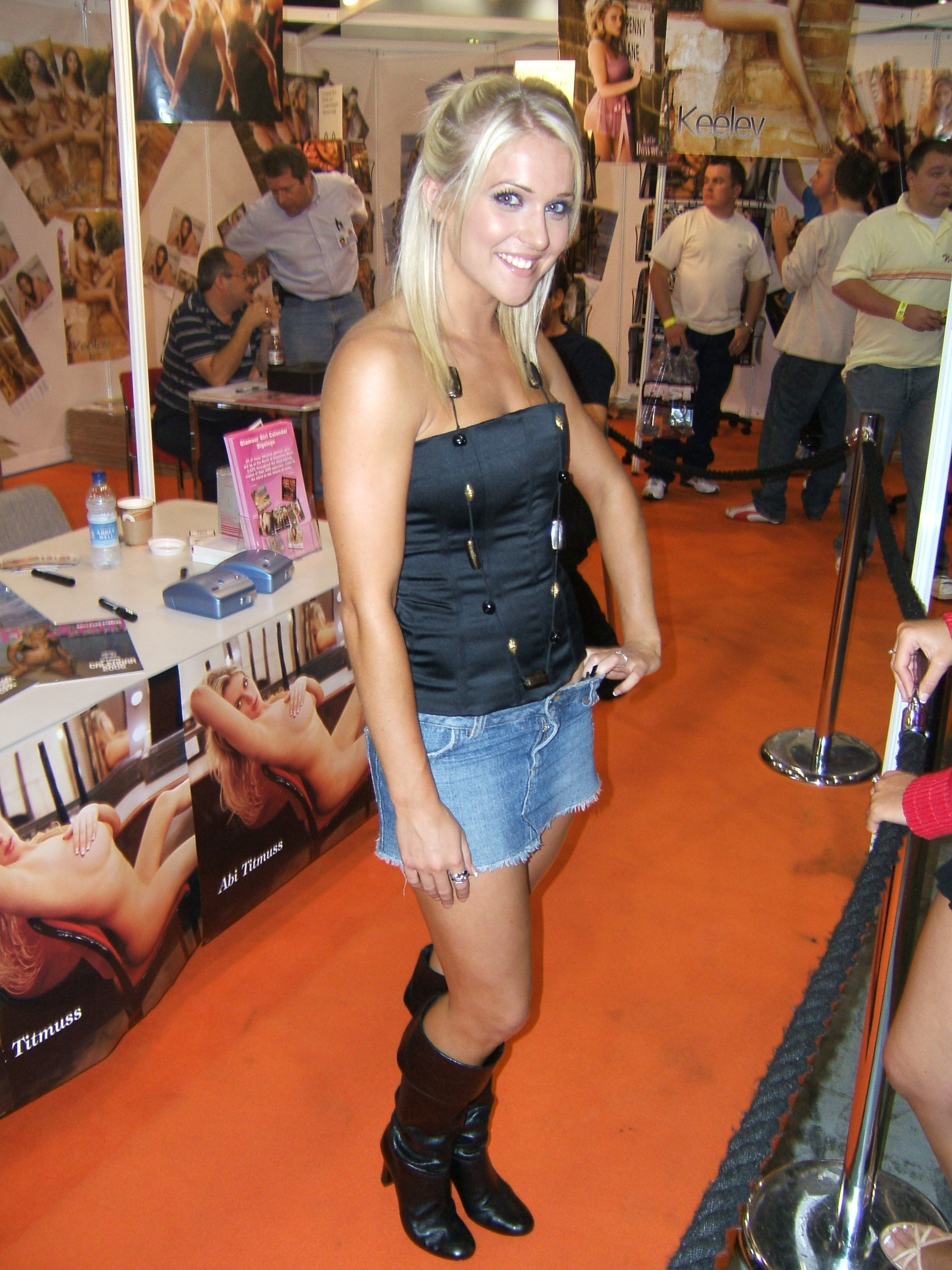
- Pearson at Excel London, 2005
- Born: Kayleigh Emma Pearson; 25 June 1985 (age 41); Bath, Avon, England
- Other name: Hannah May Rose
- Occupation: Model
- Modelling information
- Height: 5 ft 4 in (1.63 m)
- Hair colour: Blonde
- Eye colour: Blue
- Agency: International Model Management (IMM)

Kayleigh Emma Pearson (born 25 June 1985) is an English model who is most famous for winning FHM's second High Street Honey competition, in 2003.

Born in Bath, Somerset, she was named after the Marillion song "Kayleigh" when it was in the charts in 1985, which her mother heard on the radio while in hospital after giving birth. Raised in Bewdley, she attended Bewdley High School and studied sports science at the University of Worcester.

Pearson was the winner of FHM's High Street Honeys competition in 2003. Her audition photo had been originally taken to send to her then-boyfriend, a soldier, to boost his morale while he was stationed in Iraq.

Pearson released a single in 2004 with The Girls of FHM called "Do U Think I'm Sexy?" which reached No. 7 in the charts. In 2006, she had her breast size increased from 34B to 34DD, and first appeared topless in Nuts magazine.

Pearson is one of the original Candy Girls of the CandyCrib. Along with Louise Cliffe, Claire Andrisani, Natalie Oxley, Jerri Byrne, Hannah Joy Lewis, Jodie Nicholls and Krystle Gohel, she spent most of 2005 living in the CandyCrib – a reality TV show featuring the UK's top glamour models.
