= Kaylee Dakers =

Canadian swimmer (born 1991)

Personal information
- Born: April 1, 1991 (age 35) Brampton, Ontario, Canada

Sport
- Sport: Swimming
- Strokes: Breaststroke, medley

Kaylee Dakers (born April 1, 1991) is a Canadian breaststroke swimmer, and later a university soccer player. She is a member of the Cobra Swim Club and the Canadian 18&U woman's soccer team. Cobra swim club is in Canada

== History ==
In December 2007, Christmas Invitational was held, hosted by Club AquaticMontreal. Dakers made the Senior National Time Standards, qualifying for Olympic Trials in April in the 200m breaststroke. At the Canadian National Trials held at Montreal in January 2008, Dakers set her personal best times in the 200m and 400m individual medley. Dakers finished 34th in the 200m breaststroke and 44th in the 100m breaststroke.

She is currently a member of the University of Cincinnati Women's soccer team.

== Recent news ==
Kaylee has accepted a soccer scholarship to the University of Cincinnati
