= Callan =

Callan is a masculine given name and surname of Irish and Scottish origin. It can derive from Ó Cathaláin ("descendant of Cathalán") or be an Anglicized form of the Gaelic Mac Allin or Mac Callin.

Notable people with the name include:

== Surname ==
- Aela Callan, Australian news reporter
- Alan Callan (1946–2014), American businessman, musician, and filmmaker
- Clair A. Callan (1920–2005), American politician from Nebraska
- Colm Callan (born 1923), Irish rugby player
- Curtis Callan (born 1942), American physicist
- Dave Callan (born 1975) Irish-Australian comedian
- David Callan, Australian standup comedian
- Dennis Callan (1932–2006), Welsh footballer
- H. G. Callan (1917–1993), British biologist
- Hughie Callan (1881–1917), Australian footballer
- James Callan (1947–2024), American Roman Catholic priest, cofounder of Roman Catholic splinter group Spiritus Christi
- James L. Callan (1910–1991), American businessman and politician from Wisconsin
- John Callan O'Laughlin (1873–1949), American military journalist
- John Fullarton Callan, Canadian politician from Ontario
- John S. Callan (1890–1950), American politician from Nebraska
- K Callan (born 1942), American actress
- Michael Callan (1935–2022), American actor
- Michael Feeney Callan, Irish writer, filmmaker, and painter
- Nicholas Callan (1799–1864), Irish priest and physicist
- Oliver Callan, Irish radio satirist
- Paul Callan (born 1939), British print journalist
- Peter M. Callan (1894–1965), American politician
- Philip Callan (born 1837), Irish MP
- Ricky Callan (1961–2016), Scottish actor
- Robert Emmet Callan, American Army Coast Artillery officer
- Thomas J. Callan (1853–1908), American soldier at the Battle of Little Big Horn
- Tim Callan (born 1984), Australian footballer

== Title ==
- George Agar, 1st Baron Callan (1751–1815), Anglo-Irish politician and peer

== Given name ==
- Callan Beasy (born 1982), Australian rules footballer
- Callan Chythlook-Sifsof (born 1989), American Olympic snowboarder
- Callan Elliot (born 1999), New Zealand professional footballer
- Callan McAuliffe (born 1995), Australian actor
- Callan Mulvey (born 1975), Australian actor
- Callan O'Keeffe (born 1996), South African racing driver
- Callan Pinckney (1939–2012), American fitness advisor
- Callan Potter (born 1984), Australian mixed martial artist
- Callan Rydz (born 1998), English professional darts player
- Callan Ward (born 1990), Australian rules footballer

== Fictional characters ==
- Eileen Callan, a character in the UK soap opera Family Affairs
- David Callan, the titular character of Callan

== See also ==
- Callum (name), a list of people with the given name and surname
- Caolan (given name), a list of people with the given name
- Caoilfhionn (given name), a list of people with the given name
