= Murder of Kayleigh Haywood =

British murder case of a 15-year-old following online grooming that occurred in 2015

Kayleigh Haywood
- Born: 6 August 2000; England
- Died: 15 November 2015 (aged 15); Ibstock, Leicestershire, England
- Cause of death: Blunt force trauma
- Body discovered: 18 November 2015
- Parent(s): Stephanie Haywood and Martin Whitby

The murder of Kayleigh Haywood, a 15-year-old girl from Measham, Leicestershire, took place in November 2015, following online grooming by Luke Harlow, a 27-year-old man who had contacted her on the social networking website Facebook.

== Background ==
Harlow and Kayleigh exchanged 2,643 text messages following an initial contact on Facebook. Two weeks following the first contact, Kayleigh agreed to meet Harlow at his house in Ibstock, Leicestershire, on 13 November 2015. Upon meeting, Harlow supplied Kayleigh with large quantities of alcohol and touched her sexually. He then informed his neighbour, 29-year-old Stephen Beadman, that he had a "bird" at his house.

== Murder ==
Beadman raped Kayleigh while she was drunk, before beating her to death with a brick. She was reported missing and a search was conducted to find her. Her body was found five days later in lakeside undergrowth near Ibstock. On 24 November 2015, an inquest heard that Kayleigh Haywood had died as a result of head and facial injuries, and her body had to be identified by dental records. A post-mortem examination also confirmed that she had been raped.

== Legal proceedings and aftermath ==
On 20 November 2015, shortly after Stephen Beadman had been arrested in connection with the disappearance and ultimately the murder of Kayleigh Haywood, Leicestershire Police announced that he had been charged with rape and murder, and that Luke Harlow had been charged with grooming and two counts of having sexual activity with a child. Both were remanded in custody to await trial.

Beadman admitted the murder of Kayleigh Haywood on 5 April 2016, while Harlow admitted the grooming and sexual activity charges, but denied a charge of false imprisonment, meaning that he would face a Crown Court trial on that charge, while Beadman's sentencing would be delayed until afterwards. Harlow was found guilty of that charge on 28 July 2016, with his sentencing and that of Beadman being heard 1 July 2016. Harlow was sentenced to 12 years in prison, while Beadman received a life sentence with a minimum term of 35 years, making him ineligible for parole until 2050. Harlow was found to have groomed two other girls online, aged 13 and 15, both of whom believed he was their boyfriend.

Stephen Beadman died in prison on 8 April 2021. An inquest concluded that Beadman took his own life by applying a ligature to his neck. Beadman was also bullied in prison and had a history of self-harm.

== Media portrayal ==
The grooming and murder of Kayleigh Haywood resulted in Kayleigh's Love Story, a film produced by Leicestershire Police and Affixxius Films which was shown to schoolchildren in Leicestershire and Rutland. A second documentary was screened on Channel 5, entitled Murder on the Internet.

== See also ==
- List of solved missing person cases (post-2000)
- Internet homicide
