= Henry Priaulx Cayley =

- Born: 29 December 1877; Clifton, Bristol, England
- Died: 31 December 1942 (aged 65); Chelsea, London, England
- Military career
- Allegiance: United Kingdom; Australia
- Branch: Royal Navy (1891–12); Royal Australian Navy (1912–31)
- Service years: 1891–1931
- Rank: Rear Admiral
- Commands: HMAS Melbourne (1927); Flinders Naval Depot (1922–23); HMAS Sydney (1919–22)
- Conflicts: Boxer Rebellion; First World War

Rear Admiral Henry Priaulx Cayley (29 December 1877 – 31 December 1942) was a British Royal Navy officer who transferred to the Royal Australian Navy in 1912, rising to flag rank.
