= Kayleigh Hines =

English footballer

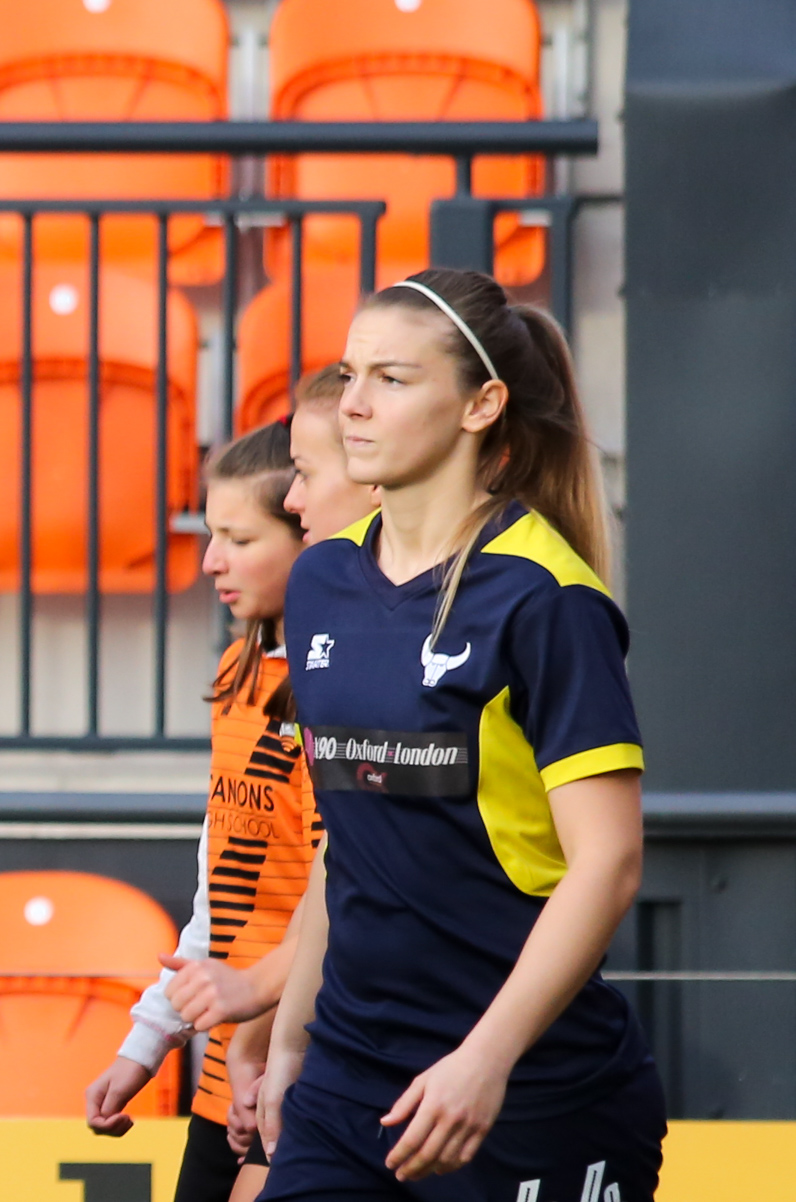
- Hines in 2017

Personal information
- Full name: Kayleigh Hines
- Date of birth: 27 February 1991 (age 35)
- Place of birth: Reading, England
- Position: Midfielder

Team information
- Current team: Peterborough United
- Number: 41

Youth career
- Reading
- Arsenal
- St Albans

Senior career*
Years	Team	Apps	(Gls)
	Millburn Magic	0	(0)
2014–2015	Oxford United	41	(7)
2016–2017	Reading	18	(0)
2017–2018	Oxford United	9	(6)
2019-2022	Oxford United	17	(6)
2022-2024	Loughborough Lightning		
2024-2026	Peterborough United		
- * Club domestic league appearances and goals as of 12:51. 15 October 2022 (UTC)

Kayleigh Hines (born 27 February 1991) is a retired English footballer who played as a midfielder for Peterborough United. She previously played for Reading.

== Early life ==
Hines began playing football at age 8 and eventually joined a local boys' team where she played until the age of 12. She then joined the Reading F.C.'s Centre of Excellence. As a teenager, Hines played for Arsenal Academy and St Albans. At the age of 18, she travelled to New Jersey in the United States where she played for Women's Premier Soccer League (WPSL) side Millburn Magic. Named to the WPSL's All-East First Team in 2010, Hines also coached the Millburn Magic Under-9 summer select team.

== Playing career ==
=== Oxford United, 2014–2015 ===
Hines signed with Oxford United in the FAWSL 2 for the league's inaugural season. In June 2014, she scored a goal from 40 yards out against Durham helping Reading win 2–1. Oxford finished the regular season in ninth place with a 3–12–3 record. Hines made 22 appearances for the club and scored two goals during the 2014 season.

Returning for the 2015 season, Hines scored a brace against Reading leading Oxford United to a draw in April. She finished the season with seven goals in 17 appearances. Oxford United finished sixth in the season.

=== Reading FC, 2016– ===
In December 2015, it was announced that Hines had signed a professional contract with Reading F.C. in FA WSL 1. Of her signing, Reading manager Kelly Chambers said, 'I have known of Kayleigh's ability for a long time. It's great to get her signature on the dotted line, she will bring a different dimension to our team that maybe we have been lacking previously."
