= Cayley baronets =

Title in the Baronetage of England

The Cayley Baronetcy, of Brompton in the County of York, is a title in the Baronetage of England. It was created on 26 April 1661 for William Cayley, who had earlier fought as a Royalist in the Civil War. His great-great-great-grandson (the title having descended from father to son), the sixth Baronet, was a pioneer of aeronautical engineering and also represented Scarborough in the House of Commons. The baronetcy descended in the direct line until the death of his great-great-grandson, the tenth Baronet, in 1967. The late Baronet was succeeded by his second cousin once removed, the eleventh and (as of 2007) present holder of the title. He is the great-grandson of Digby Cayley, second son of the seventh Baronet.

== Cayley baronets, of Brompton (1661) ==
- Sir William Cayley, 1st Baronet (1610–1681)
- Sir William Cayley, 2nd Baronet (1635–c. 1708)
- Sir Arthur Cayley, 3rd Baronet (c. 1654–1727)
- Sir George Cayley, 4th Baronet (c. 1707–1791)
- Sir Thomas Cayley, 5th Baronet (1732–1792)
- Sir George Cayley, 6th Baronet (1773–1857)
- Sir Digby Cayley, 7th Baronet (1807–1883)
- Sir George Allanson Cayley, 8th Baronet (1831–1895)
- Sir George Everard Arthur Cayley, 9th Baronet (1861–1917)
- Sir Kenelm Henry Ernest Cayley, 10th Baronet (1896–1967)
- Sir Digby William David Cayley, 11th Baronet (born 1944)

The heir apparent to the baronetcy is Thomas Theodore William Cayley (born 1997), eldest son of the 11th Baronet by his second wife, Cathryn Mary Russell.
