= 1893 New Year Honours =

British Victorian royal appointments

The 1893 New Year Honours were appointments by Queen Victoria to various orders and honours to reward and highlight good works by members of the British Empire. They were published on 2 January 1893.

The recipients of honours are displayed here as they were styled before their new honour, and arranged by honour, with classes (Knight, Knight Grand Cross, etc.) and then divisions (Military, Civil, etc.) as appropriate.

== British Empire ==
=== Knight Bachelor ===
- John Tankerville Goldney, Chief Justice of Trinidad.

=== Order of the Star of India ===
==== Knight Commander (KCSI) ====
- Anthony Patrick MacDonnell, CSI, Indian Civil Service, Chief Commissioner of the Central Provinces.
- Kumarapuram Sheshadri Aiyar, CSI, Dewan of Mysore.

==== Companion (CSI) ====
- Trevor John Chichele Plowden, Indian Civil Service, Resident at Hyderabad.
- Raja Udai Pratap Singh, of Bhinga in Oudh.
- George Robert Elsmie, Indian Civil Service, Senior Financial Commissioner in the Punjab.
- John Frederick Price, Indian Civil Service, Chief Secretary to the Government of Madras.

=== Order of Saint Michael and Saint George ===
==== Knight Commander of the Order of St Michael and St George (KCMG) ====
- Hubert Edward Henry Jerningham, CMG, Lieutenant-Governor and Colonial Secretary of the Colony of Mauritius.
- Anthony Colling Brownless, CMG, Chancellor of the University of Melbourne.
- Major George Sydenham Clarke, Royal Engineers, CMG, late Secretary to the Colonial Defence Committee.

==== Companion of the Order of St Michael and St George (CMG) ====
- Captain Sir Baldwin Wake Walker, Bt, Royal Navy, for services as Senior Naval Officer engaged in the protection of the Newfoundland Fisheries.
- Francesco Vella, Collector of Customs and Superintendent of the Ports of the Island of Malta.
- William Robinson Boothby,, Sheriff of South Australia.
- Charles Anthony King-Harman,, Auditor-General of the Island of Barbados.
- Samuel Yardley, Secretary to the Agent-General in London for the Colony of New South Wales.
- Major Arthur Herbert Kenney, Royal Engineers, for services as British Representative on the Joint Commissions for the delimitation of the Boundaries between the Colonies of the Gambia and Sierra Leone, respectively, and the adjoining French Possessions, under the Anglo-French Agreement of 10 August 1889.

=== Order of the Indian Empire ===
==== Knight Commander (KCIE) ====
- His Highness Sher Mahomed Khanji Jorawar Khanji Lohani, Dewan of Pahlanpur.
- Mir Jam Ali Khan, CIE, Jam of Las Bela.
- Major-General Edwin Henry Hayter Collen, CIE, Indian Staff Corps, Secretary to the Government of India in the Military Department.
- Raja Amir Hassan of Mahmoodabad.
- Lieutenant-Colonel William Brereton Hudson, CIE, Commandant of the Bihar Light Horse.

==== Companion (CIE) ====
- William Benjamin Oldham, Indian Civil Service, Commissioner of Chittagong.
- Nawab Amir-ud-din Ahmed Khan Bahadur, Fakhar-ud-Daula, Chief of Loharu.
- Maharaja Harbullub Narayan Singh, of Sonbarsa, Bengal.
- Colonel Kenneth James Loch Mackenzie, Indian Staff Corps, Commissioner of Berar.
- Colonel William Gordon Cumming, Royal Engineers, Chief Engineer and Secretary to the Chief Commissioner of Burma.
- Lieutenant-Colonel George Frederick Leycester Marshall, Royal Engineers, Chief Engineer and Joint Secretary to the Lieutenant-Governor of the Punjab.
- Sardar Jagat Singh, Sardar Bahadur, of Kalalwala.
- Edward Horace Man, Deputy Superintendent of the Andamans.
- Nourojee Maneckjee Wadia.

=== Promotions ===
Royal Navy

Captains to the rank of Rear-Admiral

- Edmund John Church, ADC.
- Walter Stewart, CB ADC.
- John Reginald Thomas Fullerton, ADC.
- Charles Barstow Theobald.

Commanders to Captain

- Henry Hart Dyke.
- Richard Penrose Humpage.
- Frank Finnis.
- Vernon Archibald Tisdall.
- William Leckie Hamilton Browne.
- Arthur William Edward Prothero.
- Percy Moreton Scott.
- George Le Clerc Egerton.
- His Royal Highness George Frederick Ernest Albert, Duke of York, KG.

Lieutenants to Commander

- Ewen Francis Domville.
- Ernest Duncombe.
- Stanley Talbot Dean-Pitt.
- Alfred Fulling Welldon.
- Charles William Thomas.
- Reginald Purves Cochran.
- William Francis Tunnard.
- Frederick Rigaud Gransmore.
- Douglas Austin Gamble.
- Cecil Burney.
- Thomas Philip Walker.
- Frederic Edward Errington Brock.
- Ian Mackenzie Fraser.
- Frederick Henry Peere Williams Freeman.
- Robert Henry Simpson Stokes.
- Richard Henry Peirse.

Sub-Lieutenants to Lieutenant

- Harry Owens Tracey.
- Eustace Le Trebe Leatham
- John Richard Le Hunte Ward.
- Godfrey Edwin Corbett.
- Walter Henry Cowan.
- John Garnet Armstrong.
- Cecil John Twistleton-Wykeham-Fiennes.
- Robert Sterling.
- Ernest Kindersley Loring.
- Llewellyn Griffiths.
- Lawrence Hill Richardson.
- Edward Stafford Houseman.
- Francis Gerard St. George Brooker.
- Thomas Drummond Pratt.
- Godfrey Tuke.
