= Henry Bayly =

Henry Bayly may refer to:

- Henry Bayly, birth name of Henry Paget, 1st Earl of Uxbridge (second creation) (1744–1812)
- Henry Bayly (British Army officer, born 1769) (1769–1846), lieutenant governor of Guernsey
- Henry Bayly (British Army officer, born 1790) (1790–1867)
- Henry Bayly (MP for Malmesbury), member of parliament in 1586 and 1589
- Henry Bayly (cricketer) (1850–1903), Australian cricketer

== See also ==
- Henry Bailey (disambiguation)
- Henry Baillie (1803–1885), British politician
- Henry Bayley (1777–1844), English clergyman
- Henry Baley (died 1701), ship's captain for the Hudson's Bay Company
- Henry Bayle (1917–1991), French diplomat
