= Henry Bailey =

Henry Bailey may refer to:

== People ==
- Henry Bailey (sport shooter) (1893–1972), American sport shooter
- Henry Bailey (Canadian politician) (1818–1897), politician in Nova Scotia
- Henry Bailey (American football) (born 1973), former American football wide receiver
- Henry Bailey (Australian politician) (1876–1962), Australian politician
- H. C. Bailey (Henry Christopher Bailey, 1878–1961), English author of detective fiction
- Henry Hamilton Bailey (1894–1961), British surgeon
- Henry Bailey (footballer) (1897–1965), English football goalkeeper

== Other ==
- Henry Bailey (sternwheeler), an 1888 sternwheel steamboat that operated on Puget Sound

== See also ==
- Henry Bayley (1777–1844), English clergyman
- Henry Baillie (1803–1885), British politician
- Henry Baley (died 1701), ship's captain for the Hudson's Bay Company
- Henry Bayle (1917–1991), French diplomat
- Henry Bayly (disambiguation)
- Harry Bailey (disambiguation)
