= Cayley Illingworth =

Archdeacon of Stow from 1862 until his death

Cayley Illingworth FRS (11 April 1759, in Nottingham – 23 August 1823, in Scampton) was Archdeacon of Stow from 1808 until his death.

Illingworth was the third son of William Illingworth, Esq a tradesman from Notthingham; his younger brother was William Illingworth (archivist) and his nephew was Admiral Juan Illingworth, he was a nephew to William Cayley (MP) and was named after his mothers family Cayley baronets. His uncle was his sponsor and patron as per the book "A topographical account of the parish of Scampton in the county of Lincoln" published by himself in 1810.

He was educated at Pembroke College, Cambridge and ordained in 1782. He held livings at Barrow upon Humber, Epworth and Scampton. He received the degree of Doctor of Divinity (DD).

== Notes ==
Church of England titles
| Preceded by Robert Wharton | Archdeacon of Stow; 1808–1823 | Succeeded by Henry Bayley |
