= Elinor Jenkins =

British female poet (1893–1920)

Elinor May Jenkins (1893–1920) was a British war poet.

== Early life ==
She was born on 3 September 1893, in Bombay, India. Her parents were Sir John Lewis Jenkins KCSI (1857–1912), a civil servant who became Vice President of the Indian Viceroy's Council, and Florence Mildred Trevor (1870–1956).

The Jenkins had seven children, Arthur Lewis Jenkins (1892–1917), Elinor May Jenkins (1893–1920), Evan Meredith Jenkins (1896–1985), Joyce Angharad Jenkins (1897–1983), David Llewellyn Jenkins (1899–1969), John (Jock) Vaughan Jenkins (1903–1936) and Owain Trevor Jenkins (1906–1996).

The family returned to Britain in 1901 and lived in 'The Beehive', Littleham, Exmouth, Devon, where she attended Southlands School in Exmouth. On the death of her father the family moved to live at Sussex House, Kew Road, Surrey.

== Poetry ==
Her First World War poetry was published as Poems by Sidgwick and Jackson in 1915, and reissued in 1921 with 16 later poems as Poems: to which are now added last poems, and a portrait.

One review in the Western Daily Press noted that "Miss Jenkins writes with deep feeling concerning the departure of dear ones for the war, indeed there is throughout these verses an outpouring of sympathy and love for the men with the valour to dare and the fortitude to die for their country's sake" and "they are weighted with solemn musings and imaginings, and the richness of the language and the appropriateness of metres should win admirers of Miss Jenkins's work." The Asiatic Review notes that "This little book of song introduces us to one who, we venture to predict, will be ranked high among the Singers of our land. A sad lilt pervades most of these poems: they are mournful, like the times, and whisper of family bereavement and personal sorrow."

The review in The Scotsman said: "Though there is one piece in this book about lovers walking in a garden and one about feather boats set sailing in a pool; though in form many of the pieces are sonnets, and only one is set in terms of an epitaph; yet thewhole book, by its tone and themes, is elegiac. Nearly every piece in it mourns about some aspect of the war or of the distress it has caused to those who show a brave face at home while those dear to them are in the field."

Another review in The Evening Star said "In 'The Last Evening' she depicts with tender grace and sincere emotion the feelings aroused by the departure of her soldier brother. It is the picture of a family dinner party from which the young warrior goes straight to the war."

Among the legions of beleaguering fears,

Still we sat on and kept them still at bay,

A little while, a little longer yet,

And wooed the hurrying moments to forget

What we remembered well,

—Till the hour struck—then desperately we sought

And found no further respite—only tears

We would not shed, and words we might not say.

We needs must know that now the time was come

Yet still against the strangling foe we fought,

And some of us were brave and some

Borrowed a bubble courage nigh to breaking,

And he that went, perforce went speedily

And stayed not for leave-taking.

But even in going, as he would dispel

The bitterness of incomplete good-byes,

He paused within the circle of dim light,

And turned to us a face, lit seemingly

Less by the lamp than by his shining eyes.

So, in the radiance of his mastered fate,

A moment stood our soldier by the gate

And laughed his long farewell—

Then passed into the silence and the night.

The review in Country Life described 'H.S.T. Requiescat'

Now he is safe from any further ill,

Nor toils in peril while at ease we sit,

Yet bides our loss in thinking of him still,—

Of sombre eyes, by sudden laughter lit,

Darkened till all the eternal stars shall wane;

And lost the incommunicable lore

Of cunning fingers ne'er to limn again

And restless hands at rest for ever more.

as "a piece of exquisite writing." It was written for her uncle, Lieutenant Harry Spottiswoode Trevor, son of Sir Arthur Trevor, who was killed in action aged 26.

'Epitaph on a Child left buried abroad' was included in Poems from India, by Members of the Forces (1945).

Father, forget not now that we must go,

A little one in alien earth low laid;

Send some kind angel when Thy trumpets blow

Lest he should wake alone, and be afraid.

Her poems were later included in several First World War anthologies, such as Welsh Poets (1917), and reprinted several times in the 21st century.

She also wrote a poem for her brother before she died.

Finis.
Soldier and poet, we you loved bring laurel,
Bring burnished laurel and sharp-scented bay;
Bays to the poet, laurels to the soldier,
The last vain gifts before we go our way.

All your sweet songs dumb in the dust lie with you,
All your great deeds, ash on war's altars lie;
Now we that loved you crown you once and leave you,
Poet and soldier, greeting and good-bye.

== War work and death ==
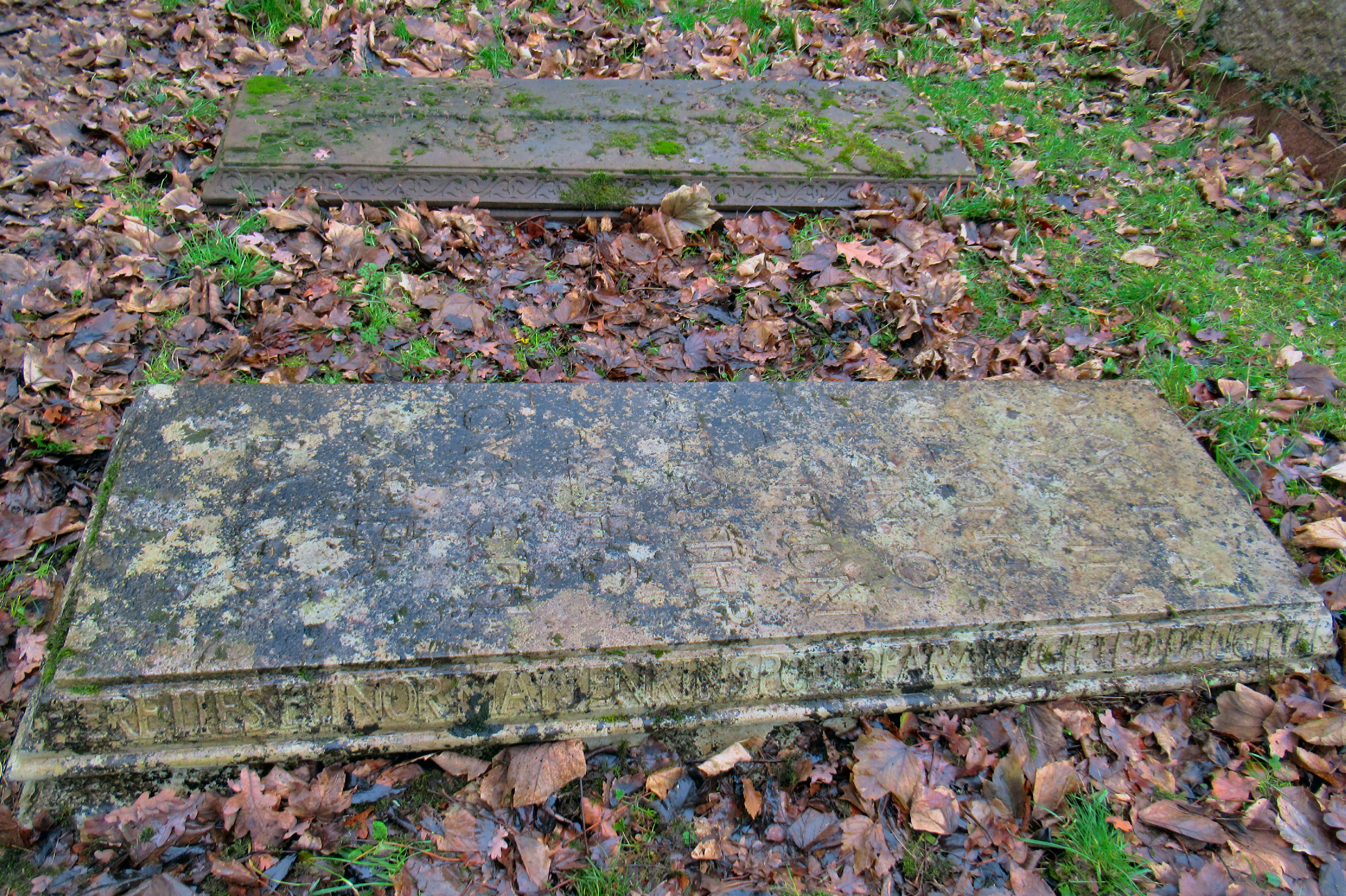
Grave in Richmond Cemetery

In World War I she was employed in 1917 as a clerk in the Censor's Department in MI5, and was still working when she died.

She died on 28 February 1920 of influenza during the Spanish flu epidemic, in a nursing home at 38 Mount Ararat Road, Richmond; her place of residence was still listed as Sussex House. She is buried in Richmond Cemetery next to her brother, Arthur Lewis Jenkins (1892–1917), who was also a war poet, together with other members of her family. Her funeral service was taken by her uncle, Rev N Llewelyn Jenkins. The Western Mail reported her death: "She had only been ill for a fortnight, and her death was quite unexpected. She has fallen a martyr to her country's cause, for there is no doubt that her death was hastened, if not caused, by her devotion to her war work at the Censor's Department. A host of Welsh people lament the passing of a most talented poetess."

On the side of her grave is the inscription "Here lies Elinor May Jenkins, Poet, Dear and gifted daughter of Sir John Jenkins and .... Died 28 February 1920". The inscription on top of her grave, in Greek, is from Callimachus's elegy for Heraclitus of Halicarnassus: "αἱ δὲ τεαὶ ζώουσιν ἀηδόνες, ᾗσιν ὁ πάντων ἁρπακτὴς Ἀίδης οὐκ ἐπὶ χεῖρα βαλεῖ." which has been translated by William Johnson Cory as

"Still are thy pleasant voices, thy nightingales, awake;

For Death, he taketh all away, but them he cannot take."

Heraclitus – via Wikisource.

== Books ==
- Poems, Sidgwick and Jackson (1915)
- Poems: To which are Now Added Last Poems, and a Portrait, Sidgwick and Jackson (1921)
- Poems, HardPress Publishing, ISBN 978-1314315554 (2013)
- Poems, Leopold Classic Library (2015)
- Poems (Classic Reprint), Forgotten Books, ISBN 978-0483792289 (2018)
