= Christopher Laurence =

English Anglican clergyman

John Harvard Christopher Laurence (15 April 1929 - 21 February 2025) was an English Anglican clergyman who was Archdeacon of Lindsey from 1985 until 1994.

Laurence was educated at Christ's Hospital, Trinity Hall, Cambridge and Westcott House, Cambridge. He was an officer in the Royal Lincolnshire Regiment from 1948 to 1950. After a curacy at St Nicholas, Lincoln he was Vicar of St George, Scunthorpe from 1959 to 1973. He was St Hugh's Missioner for the Diocese of Lincoln from 1974 to 1979; and the Bishop of London's Director of Clergy Training, from 1979 to 1985.

He died in 2025, aged 95.

== Notes ==
Church of England titles
Preceded by Bill Dudman	Archdeacon of Lindsey; 1985 – 1994	Succeeded by Roderick Wells
