= 1899 Birthday Honours =

In celebration of the birthday of Queen Victoria

The Queen's Birthday Honours 1899 were announced on 3 June 1899 in celebration of the birthday of Queen Victoria. The list included appointments to various orders and honours of the United Kingdom and British India.

The list was published in The Times on 3 June 1899 and the various honours were gazetted in The London Gazette on 3 June 1899, and on 13 June 1899.

The recipients of honours are displayed or referred to as they were styled before their new honour and arranged by honour and where appropriate by rank (Knight Grand Cross, Knight Commander etc.) then division (Military, Civil).

It was announced in the list that The Queen had been pleased to confer the title of Lord Mayor upon the Mayor of the City of Bristol.

== Baronet ==
- The Right Honourable Samuel James Way, Chief Justice of South Australia
- Thomas Brooke, Esq.
- Samuel Hoare, Esq., MP
- Thomas Salt, Esq.
- Professor John Scott Burdon Sanderson
- John Usher, Esq.

== Knight Bachelor ==
- Lawrence Alma-Tadema, RA
- Walter Armstrong, Director of the National Gallery of Ireland
- William Mitchell Banks, MD, FRCS
- John Edmund Barry, President of Dublin Chamber of Commerce
- Herbert Hardy Cozens-Hardy, one of the Justices of Her Majesty's High Court of Justice
- Alured Dumbell, Judge of the Chancery Division of the High Court of Justice and Clerk of the Rolls for the Isle of Man
- Charles Bowman Logan, W.S., Society of Writers, Deputy-Keeper of the Signet of Scotland
- James Creed Meredith, LL.D, Secretary of the Royal University of Ireland
- Thomas Morel, ship- and coalowner and Mayor of Cardiff
- Walter Murton, CB, solicitor to the Board of Trade
- Henry Evelyn Oakeley, late Chief Inspector of Schools, Education Department
- William Pollitt, Railway Company Manager
- John Francis Rotton, QC, Legal Adviser to the Local Government Board
- John Sibbald, physician, Lunacy Commissioner in Scotland
- Joseph Frizelle, late Chief Justice of the High Court of the Punjab
- William Fischer Agnew, Recorder of Rangoon
- Lawrence Hugh Jenkins, Chief Justice of the High Court of Bombay
- John Alexander Boyd, Chancellor of the High Court of the Province of Ontario
- Thomas Crossley Rayner, Chief Justice of the Colony of Lagos
- Robert Alexander Taylor of Coleraine
- Matthew Harris, Mayor of the City of Sydney, New South Wales
- Thomas Jackson, Hong Kong

Other 1899 Knights Bachelor

- Herbert Ashman, Lord Mayor of Bristol (15 November)
- George Farwell, judge of the High Court (28 November)
- Franklin Lushington, Chief Magistrate, Metropolitan Police courts (28 November)

== The Most Honourable Order of the Bath ==
=== Knight Grand Cross of the Order of the Bath (GCB) ===
==== Civil division ====
- The Right Honourable Sir Charles Stewart Scott, GCMG, CB, Ambassador Extraordinary and Minister Plenipotentiary at Saint Petersburg.
- Henry Morton Stanley, Esq, MP

==== Military division ====
- General Sir John Forbes, KCB, Bombay Cavalry.
- Admiral Sir Walter James Hunt-Grubbe, KCB.
- Admiral the Honourable Sir Edmund Robert Fremantle, KCB CMG.
- Admiral Sir John Ommanney Hopkins, KCB.
- General Sir Robert Biddulph, GCMG KCB, Royal Artillery, Governor and Commander-in-Chief, Gibraltar.

=== Knight Commander of the Order of the Bath (KCB) ===
==== Civil division ====
- Colonel John Farquharson, CB, Royal Engineers, late Director-General of the Ordnance Survey.
- George Herbert Murray, Esq CB, Secretary to the General Post Office.
- William Henry Preece, Esq CB, Consulting Engineer to the General Post Office.
- Michael Foster, Esq, Secretary to the Royal Society.

==== Military division ====
- Lieutenant-General Frederick Arthur Willis, CB (since deceased).
- Major-General and Honorary Lieutenant-General Henry Radford Norman, CB
- Major-General and Honorary Lieutenant-General Alexander Hugh Cobbe, CB
- Lieutenant-General Robert Gordon Rogers, CB, Indian Staff Corps.
- Lieutenant-General Benjamin Lumsden Gordon, CB, Royal (late Madras) Artillery.
- Major-General Cornelius Francis Clery, CB, Deputy-Adjutant-General to the Forces.
- Vice-Admiral Cyprian Arthur George Bridge.

=== Companion of the Order of the Bath (CB) ===
Civil Division

- James Samuel Gibbons, Esq, Chairman of the Prison Commissioners, Ireland.
- William Graham Greene, Esq, Admiralty.
- Thomas John Pittar, Esq, Principal of the Statistical Department of the Custom House.
- William Tucker, Esq, Assistant-Secretary to the Education Department.
- Captain Thomas Henry Tizard, Royal Navy.

Military division

- Surgeon-General Albert Augustus Gore, late-Principal Medical Officer in India.
- Colonel Hugh Sutlej Gough, CMG, half-pay.
- Lieutenant-Colonel and Colonel James Hay, Indian Staff Corps.
- Colonel Morgan Samuel Crofton, DSO, Assistant Adjutant-General in South Africa.
- Lieutenant-Colonel and Colonel James Cook, Indian Staff Corps.
- Lieutenant-Colonel and Brevet Colonel Samuel Job Lea, Army Service Corps, Deputy-Assistant Adjutant-General, Headquarters, Ireland.

== Order of the Star of India ==
=== Companions of the Order of the Star of India (CSI) ===
- Henry Farrington Evans, Esq., Indian Civil Service.
- Lieutenant-Colonel John Muir Hunter, Indian Staff Corps.

== Order of St Michael and St George ==
=== Knights Grand Cross of the Order of St Michael and St George (GCMG) ===
- Sir Walter Joseph Sendall, K.C.M.G., Governor and Commander-in-Chief of the Colony of British Guiana.

=== Knights Commander of the Order of St Michael and St George (KCMG) ===
- Frederick Mitchell Hodgson, Esq., C.M.G., Governor and Commander-in-Chief of the Gold Coast Colony.
- David Wilson Esq,. C.M.G., Governor and Commander-in-Chief of the Colony of British Honduras.
- Major Henry George Elliot, Chief Magistrate of Tembuland, Transkei, and Pondoland, in the Colony of the Cape of Good Hope.
- Henry Moore Jackson, Esq., C.M.G., Colonial Secretary of Gibraltar.

=== Companions of the Order of St Michael and St George (CMG) ===
- Colonel Edward Robert Prevost Woodgate, C.B., lately Commandant of the West African Regiment, for services rendered while in command of the Forces on the occasion of the Expeditions (1898) against the Sierra Leone insurgents.
- Captain the Honourable Maurice Archibald Bourke, R.N., for services as Senior Naval Officer engaged in the protection of the Newfoundland Fisheries.
- John Pickersgill Rodger, Esq., British Resident, Selangor.
- John James Graham, Esq., Secretary to the Law Department of the Colony of the Cape of Good Hope.

== Order of the Indian Empire ==
=== Companions of the Order of the Indian Empire (CIE) ===
- Robert Giles, Esq.
- Frederick Augustus Nicholson, Esq., Indian Civil Service.
- Vishwanathi Patankar Madhava Rao, Member of the Mysore State Council.
- Henry Blois Hawkins Turner, Esq.
- Lieutenant-Colonel Walter Gawen King, M.B., Indian Medical Service.
- James Sykes Gamble, Esq.
- Khan Bahadur Cursetji Rustamji Thanawala, Diwan of Ratlam.
- George William Forrest, Esq.
- Captain Frank Popham Young, Indian Staff Corps.
- Reginald Hawkins Greenstreet, Esq.
- Khan Bahadur Kazi Jalal-ud-Din Khan, Akhundzada of Kandahar.
- Charles Leslie Sutherland, Esq.

== Royal Red Cross ==
- Miss Isabella Smith, Royal Naval nursing service
