= Lord Jenkins =

Lord Jenkins may refer to:

- David Jenkins, Baron Jenkins (1899–1969), British judge and Lord of Appeal in Ordinary
- Roy Jenkins, Baron Jenkins of Hillhead (1920–2003), British statesman and writer
- Hugh Jenkins, Baron Jenkins of Putney (1908–2004), British Labour Party politician and campaigner

== See also ==
- John Jones Jenkins, 1st Baron Glantawe (1835–1915), Welsh businessman and Liberal Party politician
- Patrick Jenkin, Baron Jenkin of Roding (1926–2016), British Conservative Party politician
