= David Scott (priest) =

Church of England priest

David Scott (19 June 1924 – 31 August 1996) was Archdeacon of Stow from 1975 to 1989.

Scott was educated at Trinity Hall, Cambridge and Ripon College Cuddesdon; and ordained in 1953. After a curacy at St Mark, Portsmouth he was Assistant Chaplain at the University of London. He held incumbencies at Brumby, Boston and Hackthorn. He was Priest in charge of North Carlton from 1978 to 1989; and a member of the General Synod of the Church of England from 1978 to 1980.

== Notes ==
Church of England titles
Preceded by Sidney Harvie-Clark	Archdeacon of Stow; 1975–1989	Succeeded by Roderick Wells
