= Al Gore (disambiguation) =

Al Gore (born 1948) is an American politician, former U.S. vice president (1993–2001) and Nobel laureate.

Al Gore may also refer to:

- Albert Gore Sr. (1907–1998), father of Al Gore, Jr., also a former U.S. politician
- Albert N. Gore, Democratic candidate in the 2012 United States Senate election in Mississippi
- Alan Gore (1926–2006), an Australian-born British architectural designer and garden historian
- Albert Augustus Gore (1840–1901), Irish surgeon-general
