= Robert Wharton =

Robert Wharton or Warton may refer to:

- Robert Wharton, 16th-century Bishop of Hereford
- Robert Wharton (Philadelphia) (1757–1834), mayor of Philadelphia, Pennsylvania
- Robert Warton (abbot) or Parfew (died 1557), English Benedictine abbot
- Robert Warton (umpire) (1847–1923), cricket umpire
- Robert Wharton (priest) (1751–1808), Archdeacon of Stow
