= William Illingworth =

William Illingworth may refer to:

- William H. Illingworth (1844–1893), English photographer
- William Illingworth (archivist) (1764–1845), English lawyer and archivist
