= Juan Illingworth =

English-born naval officer, general, and Ecuadorian admiral (1786–1853)

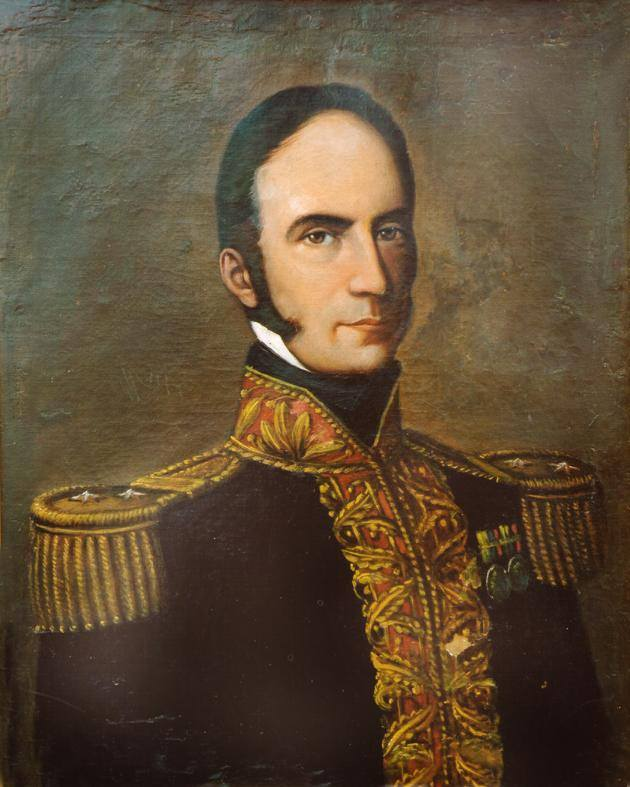
- Born: John Illingworth Hunt; March 10, 1786; Stockport, County of Chester, Kingdom of Great Britain
- Died: August 2, 1853 (aged 67); Hacienda Chonana, Daule, Ecuador
- Spouse: María Mercedes Décima-Villa y Cossío
- Military career
- Allegiance: United Kingdom; Chile; Gran Colombia; Ecuador
- Branch: Royal Navy; Chilean Navy; Navy of Gran Colombia; Navy of Ecuador
- Service years: 1801–1850
- Rank: Captain (Royal Navy); Commodore / Admiral (Chile & Ecuador); General of Independence; Rear Admiral (honorary rank Peru)
- Nickname: Silver Face (Cara de Plata)
- Commands: Corvette Rosa de los Andes; Combined Gran Colombia–Peru Squadron; Maritime Department of Guayaquil
- Conflicts: Napoleonic Wars; Spanish American wars of independence Second siege of Callao; Gran Colombia–Peru War; March Revolution (Ecuador)

Juan Illingworth (born John Illingworth Hunt; 10 March 1786 – 2 August 1853) was an English-born naval officer, privateer, general of independence, and later an Ecuadorian admiral and statesman. He served successively in the Royal Navy, the Chilean Navy, the armed forces of Gran Colombia, and the Republic of Ecuador, and is regarded by Ecuadorian historiography as a founding figure of the country's naval tradition and an early builder of the Ecuadorian state.

== Early life and Royal Navy service ==
John Illingworth Hunt was born in Stockport, County of Chester, on 10 March 1786, the son of Abraham Illingworth, Esq. and Mary Hunt. He was the nephew of Abraham's brother the Archdeacon Cayley Illingworth and William Illingworth, Esq (archivist) and great nephew of William Cayley (MP) and descendant of the Cayley and St Quintin baronets part of the gentry from Nottinghamshire and Yorkshire.

He entered the Royal Navy in 1801 at the age of fifteen and began his career as a midshipman during the height of the Napoleonic Wars.

He served aboard several major warships of the British fleet, including the 74-gun HMS Venerable, which was wrecked in a storm off Torbay in 1804, and the 98-gun HMS St George. He later served aboard HMS Surveillante, a captured French frigate, participating in the British naval operations against Denmark during the Second Battle of Copenhagen in 1807 and subsequent engagements associated with the Napoleonic conflict.

In 1809 he was involved in operations connected to the Peninsular War, including transport missions associated with Arthur Wellesley, later Duke of Wellington. Between 1809 and 1811 he distinguished himself in daring coastal actions along the Bay of Biscay, repeatedly attacking and disabling French shore batteries, feats noted in contemporary British naval histories.

He was promoted to lieutenant and later served in the East Indies during the British campaign in Java (1811), returning to Europe after extensive service in Asia. Following the end of the Napoleonic Wars, he took leave from the Royal Navy and traveled in France and Spain, acquiring fluency in French and Spanish before declining further British service in peacetime.

=== Marriage and family ===
In 1823 Illingworth married María Mercedes Décima-Villa y Cossío in Guayaquil, following a canonical dispensation issued on 8 January of that year.

She was born in Guayaquil on 1 December 1799 and was the daughter of Vicente Décima-Villa, a native of Cádiz who served as Procurador General and Alcalde Ordinario of Guayaquil, and María Gertrudis Cossío y Pérez de Villamar. The couple had several children and established their residence at the Chonana estate along the Daule River.

== Spanish American wars of independence ==
=== Service to Chile ===
In 1817 Illingworth traveled to South America and entered the service of the Republic of Chile. In 1819 he was appointed commander of the corvette Rosa de los Andes, operating under a Chilean letter of marque as a privateer against Spanish royalist shipping in the Pacific.

Between 1819 and 1821 he conducted an extensive maritime campaign along the coasts of Peru, Panama, and the Pacific regions of present-day Colombia and Ecuador. His actions included the capture of enemy vessels, the disruption of royalist supply routes, amphibious assaults on coastal fortifications, and the liberation of several towns along the Pacific littoral. These operations materially contributed to weakening Spanish control in the region and facilitating patriot advances inland.

During combat in 1820 he suffered a severe facial wound that left a permanent scar, later covered by a silver plate, earning him the sobriquet “Silver Face” (Cara de Plata).

=== Service to Gran Colombia ===
After the loss of the Rosa de los Andes in 1820, Illingworth entered the service of Gran Colombia and was granted the rank of colonel. He took part in land operations during the final campaigns for the liberation of the territory of Quito, including actions preceding the decisive Battle of Pichincha (24 May 1822), which secured independence for the region that would later become Ecuador.

Following the incorporation of the territory into Gran Colombia, he was appointed civil and military chief of the Department of Guayaquil and later Intendant General of Guayaquil. By decree of Simón Bolívar in October 1822, he organized and directed an early naval school in Guayaquil, an institution regarded by Ecuadorian historiography as a precursor to the modern Ecuadorian Navy.

=== War with Peru (1828–1829) ===
During the Gran Colombia–Peru War, Illingworth was responsible for the maritime defense of Guayaquil against the Peruvian naval blockade. Despite limited resources, he organized the city's defenses and resisted prolonged naval pressure. After months of blockade and worsening conditions, Guayaquil capitulated under honorable terms in January 1829.

He later submitted voluntarily to a court-martial to account for his conduct during the defense of the port and was fully acquitted, the tribunal recognizing the exceptional strategic difficulties he had faced.

== Ecuadorian republic and political life ==
Following the dissolution of Gran Colombia in 1830, Illingworth opposed the secessionist movement led by Juan José Flores and was briefly exiled to Peru. His properties, including the Chonana estate, were confiscated but later restored following a change in government.

After returning to Ecuador, he withdrew temporarily from military life and dedicated himself to agriculture and industrial projects in the Guayaquil region. During the March Revolution of 1845, which overthrew Flores, he accepted command responsibilities in the Guayas district and contributed to the consolidation of the new republican order.

He later served as a deputy to Congress, promoted agricultural societies, and supported early industrial initiatives in Guayaquil, including mechanical and foundry enterprises.

== Death and posthumous treatment ==
Illingworth died on 2 August 1853 at his Chonana estate in Daule, Ecuador. He was initially buried in the church of Daule. Due to disputes over his Anglican faith, his remains were later removed, prompting legal and political controversy. Ultimately, his widow recovered his remains, which were transferred to Guayaquil.

In the twentieth and twenty-first centuries, the Ecuadorian state formally recognized his historical importance. His remains were eventually placed beneath a naval monument in Guayaquil, and he is honored as a foundational figure of the Ecuadorian Navy.

=== Legacy ===
Juan Illingworth is commemorated in Ecuadorian naval institutions, historical works, and public monuments. Ecuadorian historiography regards him as a founding figure of the national navy, a key military leader of independence, and an important early statesman of the republic.

=== Family ===
According to Robles y Chambers, they had several children, including Juana Illingworth Décima-Villa, Juan Francisco Illingworth Décima-Villa, and Carolina Illingworth Décima-Villa. Through his descendants, the Illingworth family became integrated into the civic, political, and philanthropic elite of Guayaquil during the late nineteenth and twentieth centuries. Several of his descendants later held prominent roles in Ecuadorian political, academic, and philanthropic institutions.
