= William Stonehouse =

Former Archdeacon of Stow

William Brocklehurst Stonehouse, D.C.L. (b Manchester 14 April 1793 – d Owston 18 December 1862) was Archdeacon of Stow from 1862 until his death.

Stonehouse matriculated at Corpus Christi College, Oxford in 1812, graduating B.A. in 1816. He held for many years the living at Owston.

== Notes ==
Church of England titles
Preceded by Henry Bayley	Archdeacon of Stow; 1844–1862	Succeeded by John Giles
