= Archdeacon of Stow and Lindsey =

Church of England ecclesiastical office

The Archdeacon of Stow and Lindsey is a senior ecclesiastical officer in the Church of England Diocese of Lincoln.

== History ==
The Archdeaconry of Stow is an ancient division of Lincoln diocese; the first archdeacons are recorded from around 1092 (the time around which archdeacons were first appointed across the English church) and were among eight archdeacons in the exceptionally large diocese. The Archdeaconry of Lindsey was created on 22 December 1933 from the Stow archdeaconry and merged back into the Archdeaconry of Stow in 1994. The merged archdeaconry was named "the Archdeaconry of Stow and Lindsey".

== List of archdeacons ==
=== High Medieval ===
Some of the earliest archdeacons are occasionally referred to by several variations of the title, including Archdeacon of the West Riding (of Lindsey), and of Lindsey.

- bef. 1092 – ?: Hugh (Note: Hugh and Osbert are not listed with a territorial title; rather Hugh was Osbert's direct predecessor and Osbert is listed alongside the other seven archdeacons, so his territory can be deduced.)
- bef. 1133 – bef. 1134: Osbert (son of Hugh)
- bef. 1134 – aft. 1152: William son of Osbert
- bef. 1158 – bef. 1161: Roger de Almaria
- bef. 1161 – bef. 1187: Richard de Almaria
- bef. 1187 – aft. 1200: Alexander
- bef. 1200 – aft. 1208: William de Firsby
- bef. 1214 – aft. 1219 (res.): William de Thornaco (became Archdeacon of Lincoln)
- bef. 1219 – bef. September 1219 (res.): John of York
- bef. September 1219 – aft. 1222: Hugh de Sancto Edwardo
- bef. 1223 – 10 November 1223 (d.): William son of Fulk II
- bef. 1224 – aft. 1236: William of Canterbury
- bef. 1239 – bef. 1240: W.
- bef. 1240 – aft. 1241: Gilbert
- bef. 1242 – aft. 1262: Michael de Benington
- bef. 1264 – aft. 1279: Simon de Barton
- bef. 1280 – aft. 1285: Antony de Sauzthorp
- bef. 1289 – aft. 1291: Durand of Lincoln
- 30 December 1291 – bef. 1301 (res.): Joceline Kirmington

=== Late Medieval ===
- 13 January 1301 – 1301 (res.): William Ockham
- 13 July 1301 – bef. 1303 (d.): William Langwath
- 30 December 1303 – bef. September 1320: William Ockham (again)
- 26 January – bef. June 1320 (res.): Adam de Brome (ineffective royal grant)
- 16 June 1320 (grant): Richard Northwode (ineffective royal grant)
- ? – bef. 1332 (res.): Walter Stauren
- 9 January – 8 February 1332 (exch.): John Islip
- 8 February – 25 December 1332 (res.) & 1–5 January 1333 (exch.): Simon Islip
- 5 January 1333 – bef. 1334 (d.): John Nassington
- 6 November 1334 – bef. 1335 (res.): John Ragenhill or John Longespey de Regenhill
- 19 March – 9 April 1335 (exch.): Thomas Ripplingham
- 9 April 1335 – bef. 1339 (d.): John Bekingham
- 17 February 1339 – 31 December 1346 (exch.): Henry Chaddesden
- 31 December 1346 – ?: Henry Motoun
- ? – 1 March 1386 (exch.): Thomas Chandos
- 1 March 1386 – 7 June 1401 (d.): Thomas Aston
- bef. 1402 – bef. 1419 (d.): Hugh Hanworth
- 18 March 1419 – bef. 1427 (res.): Thomas Brouns (became Archdeacon of Berkshire)
- 8 July 1427 – bef. 1433 (res.): Stephen Wilton
- 29 May 1434 – 1442 (res.): William Lyndwood (became Bishop of St David's)
- bef. 1443 – 1448 (res.): William Scrope
- ? – 1452 (d.): Peter Irford or Beverlay
- 10 April – bef. September 1452 (res.): Lawrence Booth
- 20 September 1452 – 12 November 1454 (exch.): Edmund Booth
- 13 November 1454 – ?: William Witham
- 15 December 1460 – 1468 (res.): John Collinson (became Archdeacon of Bedford)
- 7 December 1468 – 26 June 1471 (exch.): Thomas Downe
- 26 June 1471 – 1475: Edmund Sheriffe
- 23 August 1477 – 1478 (res.): John Blithe (became Archdeacon of Huntingdon)
- 14 November 1477 – 8 December 1496 (d.): William Sheffield
- 20 May 1497 – ?: Robert Frost
- 24 November 1506 – bef. 1507 (d.): William Smith
- 14 December 1507 – 9 January 1543 (d.): Edward Derby

=== Early modern ===
- 15 January – July 1543 (res.): Anthony Draycot (became Archdeacon of Huntingdon)
- 24 August 1543 – 8 March 1553 (d.): Christopher Massingberd
- June 1553 – bef. 1554 (deprived): John Aylmer (deprived)
- 29 March 1554 – bef. 1559 (deprived): John Harrison (deprived)
- 1559 – 1562 (res.): John Aylmer (restored; became Archdeacon of Lincoln)
- 1563 – bef. 1576 (d.): Roger Kelke
- 26 January 1576 – 6 March 1582 (res.): Thomas Sparke
- 7 March 1582 – 4 August 1610 (d.): John Fermery
- 16 August 1610 – 6 September 1629 (d.): Alexander Chapman
- 14 September 1610 – bef. 1610: John Hills (failed installation)
- 14 September 1629 – bef. 1641 (d.): Nicholas Walker
- 14 August – 21 November 1641 (res.): James Duport
- 15 November 1641 – bef. 1677 (d.): Stephen Luddington
- 3 March 1677 – 1683 (res.): Byrom Eaton (became Archdeacon of Leicester)
- 5 September 1683 – 1684 (res.): John Gery (became Archdeacon of Buckingham)
- 4 November 1684 – 29 April 1712 (d.): John Hutton
- 22 July 1712 – 3 September 1730 (d.): Lawrence Echard
- 13 November 1730 – bef. 1751 (d.): Squire Payne
- 26 April 1751 – bef. 1765 (d.): William Bassett
- 5 September 1765 – 15 March 1791 (d.): John Towne
- 19 March 1791 – 19 January 1808 (d.): Robert Wharton
- 11 March 1808 – 28 August 1823 (d.): Cayley Illingworth
- 29 September 1823 – 12 August 1844 (d.): Henry Bayley
- 14 September 1844 – 18 December 1862 (d.): William Stonehouse

=== Late modern ===
- 1863 – 5 February 1867 (d.): John Giles, Rector of Willoughby
- 1867 – 10 December 1893 (d.): Edward Trollope, Rector of Leasingham (also Bishop suffragan of Nottingham from 21 December 1877)
- 1894–1897 (d.): George Perry, Rector of Waddington
- 1897 – 14 May 1912 (d.): John Bond, Vicar of St Peter-in-Eastgate (with St Margaret, Lincoln (until 1902) then Precentor at Lincoln Cathedral (from 1902)
- 1912–1913 (res.): George Jeudwine, Rector of Harlaxton (became Archdeacon of Lincoln)
- 1913–1921 (deprived): John Wakeford, Precentor at the Cathedral (deprived)
- 1921–1937 (res.): Ernest Blackie, Precentor at the Cathedral (also Bishop suffragan of Grantham {1930–1935} then Bishop suffragan of Grimsby {1935–1937}; became Dean of Rochester)

In 1933, the Archdeaconry of Lindsey was split from Stow archdeaconry

- 1937–1951 (res.): Arthur Greaves, Bishop suffragan of Grimsby and Precentor at the Cathedral
- 1951–1954 (res.): Mervyn Armstrong, Rector of Epworth and of Wroot (became Provost of Leicester)
- 1954–1962 (ret.): Lawrence Ashcroft, Vicar of Burton-on-Stather
- 1963–1967 (res.): Michael Roy Sinker
- 1967–1975 (ret.): Sidney Harvie-Clark, Vicar of Hackthorn and Rector of Cold Hanworth (afterwards archdeacon emeritus)
- 1975–1989 (ret.): David Scott, Vicar of Hackthorn with Cold Hanworth (also Priest-in-Charge of North and South Carlton {from 1978})
- 1989–1994: Roderick Wells (became Archdeacon of Stow and Lindsey)

==== Archdeacons of Lindsey ====
- 1934 – 27 October 1940 (d.): Herbert Parry, Rector of Bigby
- 1941 – 8 September 1948 (d.): Nathaniel Railton, Rector of Bigby (until 1943) then of Potter Hanworth
- 1948 – 21 June 1960 (d.): Lisle Marsden, Vicar of Great Grimsby (until 1951) then a canon residentiary
- 1960–1971 (ret.): Clifford Jarvis, a canon residentiary (afterwards archdeacon emeritus)
- 1971 – 29 September 1984 (d.): Bill Dudman, a canon residentiary
- 1985–1994 (ret.): Christopher Laurence (afterwards archdeacon emeritus)

==== Archdeacons of Stow and Lindsey ====
- 1994–2001 (ret.): Roderick Wells (or Archdeacon of Stow and Archdeacon of Lindsey; previously Archdeacon of Stow; afterwards archdeacon emeritus)
- 2001–2006 (res.): Tim Ellis (became Bishop suffragan of Grantham)
- April 2007 – 7 September 2014 (res.): Jane Sinclair
- 10 October 2015 – 2022 (ret.): Mark Steadman
- 18 July 2022 – present: Alyson Buxton

== Sources ==
- Greenway, Diana E. (1977), Fasti Ecclesiae Anglicanae 1066–1300, vol. 3, pp. 44–47
- King, H.P.F. (1962), Fasti Ecclesiae Anglicanae 1300–1541, vol. 1, pp. 17–19
- Horn, Joyce M.; Smith, David M. (1999), Fasti Ecclesiae Anglicanae 1541–1857, vol. 9, pp. 21–23
