= 1898 New Year Honours =

Appointments by Queen Victoria

The 1898 New Year Honours were appointments by Queen Victoria to various orders and honours to reward and highlight good works by members of the British Empire. They were published on 1 January 1898.

The recipients of honours are displayed here as they were styled before their new honour, and arranged by honour, with classes (Knight, Knight Grand Cross, etc.) and then divisions (Military, Civil, etc.) as appropriate.

== Order of the Star of India ==
=== Knights Commander (KCSI) ===
- His Highness Maharaja Lokindra Bhawani Singh Bahadur of Datia
- Arthur Charles Trevor, CSI, Indian Civil Service.
- John Frederick Price, Esq, CSI, Indian Civil Service.

=== Companions (CSI) ===
- Henry Evan Murchison James, Esq, Indian Civil Service.
- James Knox Spence, Esq, Indian Civil Service.
- Michael Finucane, Esq, Indian Civil Service.
- Charles William Odling, Esq, Chief Engineer and Public Works Secretary to the Government of the North-West Provinces and Oudh.
- Raja Tasadduk Rasul Khan, of the Bara-Banki District of Oudh.
- James Austin Bourdillon, Esq, Indian Civil Service.
- Alexander Walmesley Cruickshank, Esq, Indian Civil Service.
- Thomas William Holderness, Esq, Indian Civil Service.
- David Norton, Esq, Indian Civil Service

== Order of the Indian Empire ==
=== Knights Grand Commander (GCIE) ===
- His Highness Maharaja Sir Prabhu Narayan Singh Bahadur, of Benares, KCIE
- His Highness Sir Sher Muhammad Khan, Diwan of Palanpur, KCIE

=== Knights Commander (KCIE) ===
- Baba Khem Singh Bedi, of Kallar, CIE
- Brigade-Surgeon-Lieutenant-Colonel George King, CIE, MB
- Arthur Wilson, Esq, Legal Adviser and Solicitor, India Office

=== Companions (CIE) ===
- Charles Stewart Crole, Esq, Indian Civil Service.
- Sahibzada Muhammad Bakhtiyar Shah
- Raja Balwant Singh of Awa
- Benjamin Robertson, Esq, Indian Civil Service.
- Duncan James Macpherson, Esq, Indian Civil Service.
- John Campbell Arbuthnott, Esq, Indian Civil Service.
- Robert Warrand Carlyle, Esq, Indian Civil Service.
- Henry Cecil Ferard, Esq, Indian Civil Service.
- Captain John Ramsay, Indian Staff Corps.
- Robert Batson Joyner, Esq, Superintending Engineer, Public Works Department, Bombay.
- Charles George Palmer, Esq, Superintending Engineer, Public Works Department, North West Provinces and Oudh.
- Surgeon-Lieutenant-Colonel Samuel John Thomson, Indian Medical Service.
- Lieutenant-Colonel David Parkes Masson
- Surgeon-Major Frederick Fitzgerald MacCartie, MB, Indian Medical Service.
- Rai Bahadur Bipin Krishna Bose
- Virchand Dipchand, of Ahmedabad, Esq

== Order of St Michael and St George ==
=== Knights Commander (KCMG) ===
- Robert Baxter Llewelyn, Esq, CMG, Administrator of the Colony of the Gambia.
- The Honourable Pieter Hendrik Faure, Secretary for Agriculture of the Colony of the Cape of Good Hope.
- The Honourable James Penn Boucault, Judge of the Supreme Court of the Colony of South Australia.

=== Commanders (CMG) ===
- Captain Ronald McFarlane (late 9th Lancers), in recognition of services in connection with the suppression of the revolt of Matabeles in Rhodesia.
- Robert Henry Sawyer, Esq, Member of the Executive Council and House of Assembly of the Bahama Islands.
- John Anderson, Esq, MA, of the Colonial Department.
