= Lisle Marsden =

Archdeacon of Lindsey

Edwyn Lisle Marsden, M.A. (Lambeth) (20 September 1886 - 21 June 1960) was Archdeacon of Lindsey from 1948 until his death.

Marsen was educated at The King's School, Chester after which he a clerk with the National Provincial Bank. He was ordained Deacon in 1912, and Priest in 1913. After a curacy in Spalding he was a Chaplain to the British Armed Forces from 1917 to 1919 during which time he was mentioned in dispatches. He was Vicar of Pinchbeck from 1918 to 1921; Aspull from 1921 to 1928. He became the incumbent at St Michael and All Angels, Wigan in 1928; and of Great Grimsby in 1951. He was Proctor in Convocation from 1942 to 1948, and again from 1951 until his death.

== Notes ==
Church of England titles
Preceded by Nathaniel Gerard Railton	Archdeacon of Lindsey; 1948 – 1960	Succeeded by Alfred Clifford Jarvis
