= Clifford Jarvis (priest) =

(Alfred) Clifford Jarvis (6 February 1908 – 21 November 1981) was an Anglican priest.

Jarvis was educated at Sudbury Grammar School, Fitzwilliam House Cambridge and Lichfield Theological College. After a curacy in Brightlingsea he held incumbencies at Horningsea, Coddenham, Elsfield and Algarkirk. He was Archdeacon of Lincoln 1958 to 1960 and then of Lindsey to 1971.

Church of England titles
Preceded by Kenneth Healey	Archdeacon of Lincoln; 1958– 1960	Succeeded by Arthur Smith
Preceded by Lisle Marsden	Archdeacon of Lindsey; 1960 – 1971	Succeeded by Bill Dudman
