= Frederick Price (civil servant) =

Indian politician

Sir John Frederick Price KCSI (3 October 1839 – 12 June 1927) was an Indian civil servant and translator who served as a member of the Madras Legislative Council.

== Early life ==
Price was born to John Price on 3 October 1839. He had his education at Melbourne University and qualified for the Indian civil service.

== Career ==
Price joined the Indian civil service in 1862 and served till 1897. He also served as Chief Secretary of the Government of Madras. He was made a Companion of the Order of the Star of India in the 1893 New Year Honours, and upgraded to a Knight Commander of the Order of the Star of India in the 1898 New Year Honours.

== Works ==
- Pillai, Ananda Ranga (1904). The Private Diary of Ananda Ranga Pillai, Volume I. Translated by J. Frederick Price; K. Rangachari. Madras: Government Press.
- Pillai, Ananda Ranga (1907). The Private Diary of Ananda Ranga Pillai, Volume II. Translated by J. Frederick Price; K. Rangachari. Madras: Government Press.
