= Mark Steadman (priest) =

English Anglican priest (born 1974)

Mark John Steadman (born 20 May 1974) is a British Anglican priest. He was Archdeacon of Stow from 2015 to 2021. Since 2021, he has been chief of staff to the Archbishop of York.

== Early life and education ==
Steadman was born on 20 May 1974. He studied law at the University of Southampton, graduating with a Bachelor of Laws (LLB) degree in 1995. His first career was as a barrister, and he was called to the bar at Inner Temple in 1996. In 1999, he entered Westcott House, Cambridge to train for ordained ministry. He also studied theology at Christ's College, Cambridge, and graduated with a Bachelor of Arts (BA) degree in 2001.

== Ordained ministry ==
Steadman was ordained in the Church of England as a deacon in 2002 and as a priest in 2003. After a curacy at St Mary's Church, Portsea he was Priest in charge at St Philip's Church, Avondale Square, Camberwell from 2005 until 2012, and also Area Dean of Bermondsey from 2008 to 2011. He served as chaplain to the Bishop of Southwark from 2011 until 2015. Then 2015 to 2021, he was Archdeacon of Stow in the Diocese of Lincoln. In November 2019, he was additionally appointed acting Dean of Lincoln.

In June 2021, he was appointed chief of staff to Stephen Cottrell, the Archbishop of York. He also holds a licence to officiate in the Diocese of York.

Church of England titles
Preceded by Jane Sinclair	Archdeacon of Stow; 2015–2021	Succeeded by Alyson Buxton
