= Lawrence Ashcroft =

Archdeacon of Stow (1954–1962)

Lawrence Ashcroft (1901–1996) was the Archdeacon of Stow from 1954 to 1962.

Ashcroft was educated at Durham University and Lichfield Theological College; and ordained in 1927. After curacies in Ulverston and Egremont he was Secretary of the British and Foreign Bible Society. He was Vicar of St Saviour, Retford from 1934 to 1940; a Chaplain to the Forces from 1940 to 1943; and Rector of St Michael, Stoke, Coventry from 1943 to 1953.

He died on 18 May 1996.

== Notes ==
Church of England titles
Preceded by Mervyn Armstrong	Archdeacon of Stow; 1954 – 1962	Succeeded by Michael Roy Sinker
