= Harry Bailey (disambiguation) =

Harry Bailey (1922–1985) was an Australian psychiatrist.

Harry Bailey may also refer to:

- H. E. Bailey (1900–1976), Oklahoma politician
- Harry Bailey (footballer) (1870–1930), footballer for Leicester Fosse
- Harry Bailey (American football) (born c. 1987), American college football coach
- Harry Paul Bailey (1913–1979), professor of earth sciences
- Harry Bailey (Coronation Street)
- The Host (Canterbury Tales), or Harry Bailey, a character in Geoffrey Chaucer's poem The Canterbury Tales
- Harry Bailey, younger brother of the protagonist in the movie It's a Wonderful Life

== See also ==
- Henry Bailey (disambiguation)
- Sir Harold Walter Bailey (1899–1996), English linguist
