= George Frederick Leycester Marshall =

English entomologist

Major-General George Frederick Leycester Marshall CIE (27 March 1843 Bridgnorth, Salop – 7 March 1934) was the son of William Marshall (a clergyman) and his wife Louisa Sophia, also brother of C. H. T. Marshall and uncle of Guy Anstruther Knox Marshall. He became a colonel in the Indian Army and was a naturalist interested in the birds and butterflies of India. Marshall described several new species of butterflies, along with Lionel de Nicéville, and discovered the white-tailed iora, sometimes referred to as Marshall's iIora. He wrote The butterflies of India, Burmah and Ceylon.

Marshall retired from the Royal (late Bengal) Engineers in November 1897. Marshall married Elizabeth Huntley Muir (1851, Agra - 1913) at Allahabad in 1874. One son George Leycester Knox (born 1875) died young at Simla on 20 July 1883. Marshall was made CIE in the 1893 New Year Honours.

== Works ==
- 1870. A monograph of the Capitonidae or Scansorial Barbets - by Charles H.T. Marshall and George F.L. Marshall.
- Marshall, G.F.L. (1877). Birds' nesting in India. A calendar of the breeding seasons, and a popular guide to the habits and haunts of birds. Calcutta: Calcutta Central Press. OCLC 562551302.
- 1883 with de Nicéville, L. Butterflies of India, Burmah and Ceylon. Vol. 1. Repr. 1979, New Delhi, 327 pp.
- 1886. The Butterflies of India, Burmah and Ceylon. Vol. 2. Repr. 1979, New Delhi, 332 pp.
- 1890. The butterflies of India, Burmah and Ceylon. Vol. 3. Repr. 1979, New Delhi, 503 pp.

== Arms ==
Coat of arms of George Frederick Leycester Marshall
Notes Confirmed by Sir Arthur Vicars, Ulster King of Arms, 2 November 1907. Crest On a wreath of the colours a stag's head erased paly Or and Gules attired Sable. Escutcheon Per pale Argent and Azure a cross moline counterchanged on a chief Ermine three pallets Gules. Motto Veritas Vincit
