= William Witham =

English archdeacon (died 1472)

William Witham or Wytham (died 1472) was an Archdeacon of Stow (1454-1455), Archdeacon of Leicester (1458-1472), Dean of the Court of Arches (1448-c. 1453), and Dean of Wells Cathedral (1467-1472).

== Family and background ==
William Witham was one of the younger sons of Robert Witham and his wife Margaret, né Skendelby, and born in or about the town of Grantham. Robert Witham was a member of the lower gentry in Lincolnshire. He was most commonly described as an esquire in the medieval sources. He was a collector of the subsidy of 1428 and he served parliamentary elector in 1432. He was also on the Commissions of sewers, and a justice of the peace in Kesteven. The Witham family around Kesteven and Grantham were supporters of Richard, Duke of York during his early rising at Dartford in February, 1452. Robert and his kinsman John were both brought before the Court of King’s Bench late in 1452 and charged with riot, but both were among those pardoned by King Henry VI in the aftermath.

William likely had five brothers that survived to adulthood; Thomas, Robert, Henry, Richard, and John. Thomas Witham would rise the highest among his siblings and become Chancellor of the Exchequer under Henry VI and Edward IV, and was a member of Richard of Gloucester’s council of the north. William Dugdale wrote in his heraldic work that Robert was the rector of Terrington; Henry was a Knight of Rhodes, Richard was also a priest, and John’s occupation is unnamed, but he was the only sibling to sire children. The Witham family were likely distant relations of the Wythom family of Boston, and might attribute some of their early political rise to their cousin Hugh Wythom or Witham, a Member of parliament and wealthy merchant trader with the Hanseatic League. The politics of the Wars of the Roses likely divided the family after 1452, as Hugh was a consistent supporter of Henry VI and was an investigator into the risings at Dartford on behalf of the crown.

== Education and time at Oxford ==
William became a student at the University of Oxford sometime in the 1430s. He received his bachelors by 1439, and his doctorate in civil law in 1444. He served as principal of Pembroke College in 1436, then called Broadgates Hall, and transferred to Great White Hall (later of Jesus College) in 1438. On 30 August 1441, when Witham was principal of White Hall, there was a riot among the students at Oxford. Students from southern England rioted and broke the windows of Witham’s residence in their violence against the northern students, calling them “Scots dogs.” The following day, armed northern and southern students met in Broadgate hall and continued their violence, with many of the southerners wounded. While riots and violence were somewhat common at medieval Oxford, the severity of violence was inconsistent. The anonymous chronicle, known as Benet’s Chronicle, that records this riot is the sole document that describes the incident. Historian Michael Hicks argued that Witham was a probable author of the original version of the chronicle due to the inclusion of Witham’s name, the chronicle's sympathetic portrayal of the House of York, including their description of the failed 1452 uprising. The most recent edited version of the Chronicle does not consider Witham as a possible author.

Witham continued his studies at Oxford until after 1449, at which time he was keeper of the Four Keys Chest. He assisted in updating of accounts and rolls kept in the Langton chest, which had fallen into disrepair from neglect, in May of 1449. During his time at Oxford, Witham was a notable pluralist. He held multiple benefices in the English Church from 1447 until his death. The first pair of benefices he held at the same time was as a canon of Lincoln Cathedral, in the [[Prebendary|prebend] of Carlton-cum-Thurlby, and a canon of St Paul's Cathedral, London, prebendary of Chamberlainwood. He had been appointed the Dean of the Court of Arches 5 October 1448, and served in that capacity until c.1453. Witham appears to have left the university sometime after 1449, though why is unclear. It is likely that he left due to an increase in consultations as a legal scholar and civil lawyer that drew him away from the University.

== Diplomatic service ==
Witham called into diplomatic service by the crown at least twice over his career. Bishops and noted clergymen were commonly included in diplomatic delegations, but Witham was likely included for his legal knowledge, as his highest rank in the church before 1467 was as Archdeacon of Leicester. Witham first served as part of a diplomatic envoy to the Hanseatic League. His distant cousin Hugh Wythom, may have had a role in his selection, as Hugh was an active trader with the cities of the League. English relations with the Hanseatic states were sour in the 1440s due to conflicts over taxes on foreign merchants in both polities. The English brought this to a greater head when Robert Winnington seized over a hundred ships in a great trade fleet, many of which belonged to Hanse merchants. In the fallout, Prussia ordered that all the Englishmen in Prussia be arrested, and a Wendish ship captured two English representatives, secretary Thomas Kent and merchant John Stocker, at sea. The two were part of an envoy sent to negotiate in 1450, and both were taken to Lübeck and placed on house arrest. Witham was part of the envoy sent in early 1451 to negotiate compensation for the English seizure of the ships and establish long term trading terms. The 1451 conference failed to resolve the tensions between England and the League, though they did plan to meet again the following year. Witham was not part of future delegations.

Witham’s second known service as a diplomat was as part of an envoy to Scotland in 1462 under Richard Neville, Earl of Warwick. William’s appointment was likely due to the influence of his brother, Thomas, who had long been in the service of the Neville family. Following the Battle of Towton, Henry VI fled north into Scotland, seeking protection from Mary of Guelders, then Queen regent of Scotland. Edward IV and the Earl of Warwick sought to divide Mary’s interests in protecting the former Henry VI after Edward’s coronation. Among the several attempted diplomatic meetings, Witham was included in a delegation to meet with the Queen to discuss potential alliances, including a potential marriage between Mary and Edward IV himself. Witham was part of the delegation at the meeting at Carlisle in July 1462, but the Bishop of St. Andrews, James Kennedy, stymied any progress on establishing friendly relations between England and Scotland. Again, Witham does not appear in any future delegations.

== Ecclesiastical career and death ==
William’s rise to greater clerical power was due to a mix of political favor and his knowledge as a doctor of civil law, rather than for any personal piety. A. Compton Reeves writes that “the deanship of Wells was likely a source of income while he was engaged elsewhere.” When he was granted the prebend of Chamberlainwood as a canon of St. Paul’s, Witham’s patron was no less than King Henry VI himself, though he was likely supported by his brother Thomas, and the Earl of Salisbury. Witham did not receive patronage directly from the crown after this appointment. However, Witham was connected enough to continue to hold multiple clerical positions across England to the end of his life. In February 1453, William received papal dispensation to hold up to three normally incompatible benefices simultaneously. William was appointed Rector of St Michael, Cornhill, in London in July 1454, and he would hold this position until his death. He further held positions as Rector of Craster, Northumberland, three successive prebendaries in Lincoln Cathedral (Stow, Keton, and Banbury), and was a canon of Newarke College in Leicester. He was appointed Archdeacon of Leicester in 1458 and was made Dean of Wells in 1467. William would hold both positions until his death in 1472.

As a Doctor of Civil Law, William served in multiple important court cases throughout his career, typically as an adjudicator, or as a witness or recorder of a deposition. One case involved accusations of treasonous behavior against Ralph, Lord Cromwell in 1454. A priest known as Robert Colynsone accused Cromwell of plotting treason, claiming he learned it from a John Wylkyng, who had himself been executed for high treason. Cromwell presented one deposition taken with Witham, stating that the priest was known to have sexually assaulted women in the parish of Christ Church, and in the diocese of Leicester had preached “perilous matier”, meaning speech against the King. Witham also served in a number of wills proved in Lincolnshire, such as Richard Archer of St. Andrew’s Parish, whose will proved 12 March 1454. Witham was also present for a confession from Thomas Hull of Hertford for his assistance to another man accused of necromancy and heresy. During his time as Dean of Wells, Witham also served as an adjudicator in a case between two nuns of Godstow Abbey. The two nuns, Margaret More and Alice Nunny argued and brought suit to papal courts that each was the rightfully elected Abbess in 1470; the case was ultimately decided for Alicy Nunny by papal representatives in 1474, but by then Witham had been dead for two years.

Witham also served in multiple convocations in the archdiocese of Canterbury in the 1450s and 1460s. The records do not indicate how many times Witham attended the convocation, but he was certainly present at the convocation in early 1453, and again at the one in mid-1463. The convocation of 1453 was summoned to grant the king a subsidy. At one point, Witham served as a point of contact between the convocation and the Mayor and alderman of London, and later he was appointed to inform the bishops in the House of Lords of the decision of the convocation. The convocation of 1463 was more tenacious, and Witham played a smaller role. The convocation was summoned again to grant the new King a subsidy, but also petitioned for a reformation of the church, and requested the King release certain clergymen who were imprisoned by the King. Witham’s role was to serve as a member of a committee to revise a charter suggested by the convocation pushing reform of the church, though the report gives limited specific details.

Witham himself may not have held substantial political power, but he was influential enough to be consulted on important matters of law, and to receive multiple lucrative ecclesiastical appointments. There are no surviving records that attest to Witham’s piety or his effectiveness as an administrator. Even though Witham had widespread clerical holdings and familial connections, he was buried in Wells Cathedral after his death on 16 July 1472. The epitaph next to his tomb states that he was a “jewel of the church...a nobleman...a cheerful host...a source of council, and a champion of the church.” While the panegyric likely overstates his case, Witham did serve extensively in church, crown, and personal interests across England throughout his life.
