= Jenkins Committee on Company Law =

Company law committee

The Jenkins Committee on Company Law was a Company Law Committee, chaired by Lord Jenkins and formed under the tenure of John Rodgers (Parliamentary Secretary to the Board of Trade). It was formed in November 1959 with terms of reference To review and report upon the provisions and workings of: the Companies Act 1948; the Prevention of Fraud (Investments) Act 1958 and Registration of Business Names Act 1916

Aspects covered included takeovers; the duties of directors and the rights of shareholders

In January 1960 the committee invited comment on a range of subjects including: Incorporation of Companies and Memoranda of Association.

It reported in 1962.
