= William Henry Preece =

Welsh electrical engineer (1834–1913)

Sir William Henry Preece
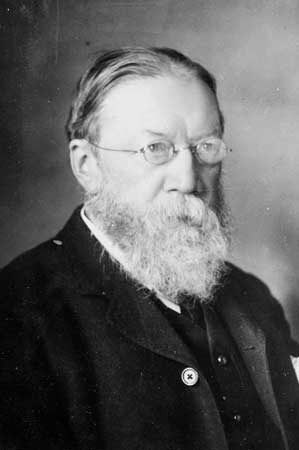
- Sir William Henry Preece
- Born: 15 February 1834; Caernarfon, Gwynedd, Wales
- Died: 6 November 1913 (aged 79)
- Education: King's College London
- Engineering career
- Discipline: Civil, Electrical,
- Institutions: British Association for the Advancement of Science (president, Section G), Institution of Civil Engineers (president), Institution of Electrical Engineers (president), Society of Telegraph Engineers (president)

Sir William Henry Preece KCB FRS (15 February 1834 – 6 November 1913) was a Welsh electrical engineer and inventor. Preece relied on experiments and physical reasoning in his life's work. Upon his retirement from the Post Office in 1899, Preece was made a Knight Commander of the Order of the Bath (KCB) in the 1899 Birthday Honours. That same year, he was elected an International Member of the American Philosophical Society.

== Biography ==
Preece was born in Caernarfon (Gwynedd), Wales. He was educated at King's College School and King's College London. Preece studied at the Royal Institution in London (Great Britain) under Michael Faraday. He later was the consulting engineer for the Post Office (1870s). He became Engineer-in-Chief of the British General Post Office in 1892. He developed several improvements in railroad signalling system that increased railway safety. Preece and Oliver Lodge maintained a correspondence during this period. Upon Lodge's proposal of "loading coils" applied to submerged cables, Preece did not realise that "Earthing" would extend the distance and efficiency.

== Telegraphy ==
In 1889 Preece assembled a group of men at Coniston Water in the Lake District in Lancashire and succeeded in transmitting and receiving Morse radio signals over a distance of about 1 mile (1.6 km) across water.

Preece also developed a wireless telegraphy and telephony system in 1892. Preece developed a telephone system and implemented it in England. A similar telephone system was patented in the United States by Alexander Graham Bell in 1876. In 1885, Preece and Arthur West Heaviside (Oliver Heaviside's brother) experimented with parallel telegraph lines and an unwired telephone receiver, discovering radio induction (later identified with the effects of crosstalk).

Preece blocked publication of some of Arthur and Oliver Heaviside's work. There was a long history of animosity between Preece and Oliver Heaviside. Oliver considered Preece to be mathematically incompetent, an assessment supported by the biographer Paul J. Nahin: "Preece was a powerful government official, enormously ambitious, and in some remarkable ways, an utter blockhead." Preece's motivations in suppressing Heaviside's work were more to do with protecting Preece's own reputation and avoiding having to admit error than any perceived faults in Heaviside's work.

== Radio ==
In 1897, with Marconi radio experiments from Lavernock Point in south Wales to the island of Flat Holm, Preece became one of Marconi's most ardent supporters. He made various efforts to support Guglielmo Marconi in the wireless field. Preece gained financial assistance from the Post Office to help expand Marconi's work. Preece believed incorrectly that the Earth's magnetic field was critical in the propagation of radio waves over long distances.

He had a long-standing rivalry with Oliver Heaviside over his understanding of electricity. It was derisively referred to as "the drain-pipe theory" by Heaviside, because Preece relied on an analogy between electricity and water for thought experiments. Reportedly, he rejected and never understood James Clerk Maxwell's advances to mathematical physics, and insisted that adding inductance to a telegraph line could only be detrimental, even while Maxwell's and Heaviside's theory and experiments showed that inductance could help.

Preece once stated, conveying sentiments later expressed by Edwin Armstrong,

True theory does not require the abstruse language of mathematics to make it clear and to render it acceptable [...] All that is solid and substantial in science and usefully applied in practice, have been made clear by relegating mathematic symbols to their proper store place – the study.

— Preece's inaugural speech as president of the Institution of Electrical Engineers in 1893

Preece served as president of the Institution of Civil Engineers between April 1898 and November 1899.

Professional and academic associations
Preceded by John Wolfe-Barry	President of the Institution of Civil Engineers; April 1898 – November 1899	Succeeded by Douglas Fox
