= Arthur Lewis Jenkins =

British soldier, pilot and poet (1892 - 1917)

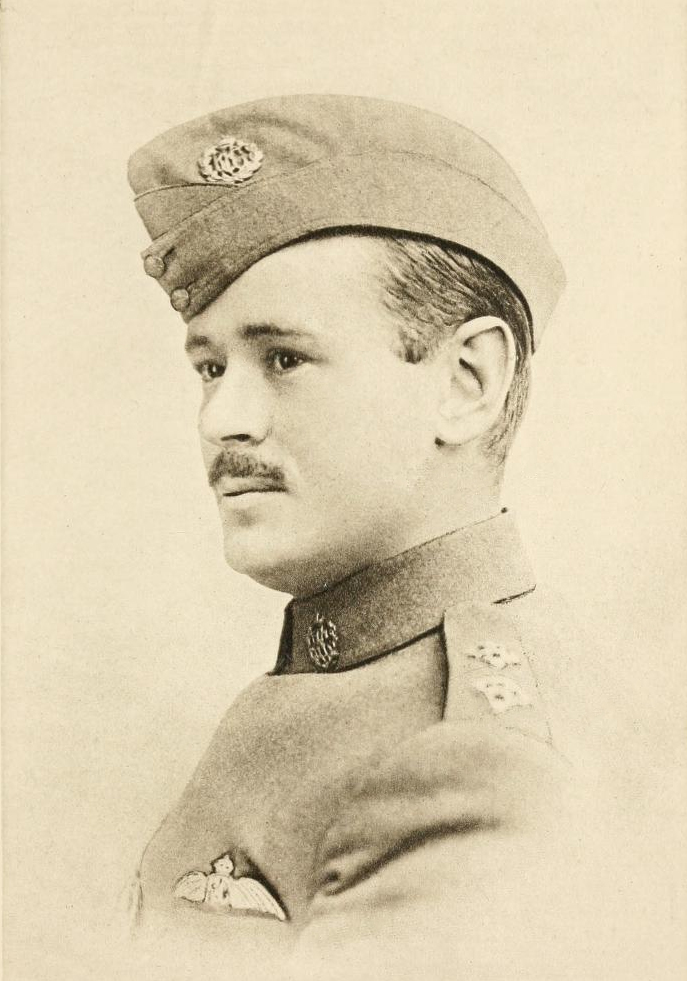
Arthur Lewis Jenkins

Arthur Lewis Jenkins (1892–1917) was a British soldier, pilot and one of the original war poets.

== Early life ==
He was born on 9 March 1892, in Barton Regis, near Bristol, Gloucestershire. His parents were Sir John Lewis Jenkins KB KCSI (1857–1912), a civil servant who became Vice President of the Indian Viceroy's Council, and Florence Mildred Trevor (1870–1956). He attended Packwood Haugh School (which was then located in Warwickshire), as did his four brothers. In 1905 he won a Foundation Scholarship to Marlborough College (1905–1911), where he was head boy, played rugby and was a member of the Officers' Training Corps (OTC). In 1910 he won a classical scholarship to Balliol College, Oxford, matriculating in 1911 and taking a Second in Honour Moderations in 1913. The family lived at 'The Beehive', Littleham, Exmouth, Devon; on the death of his father they moved to live at Sussex House, Kew Road, Surrey (now in London). Lady Jenkins later moved to Kennington, Kent.

== Career ==
Although probably destined to enter the Indian Civil Service, he left Balliol to join the British Army. In September 1914 he was commissioned as Second-Lieutenant into the Duke of Cornwall's Light Infantry. He served in India, Aden, where he was in charge of a machine-gun section, and Egypt. His section was disbanded so in May 1917 he joined as a Lieutenant in the Royal Flying Corps, doing his training in Egypt. When he was posted back to England in August he was sent for training in night flying. He was killed while night flying on duty at Helperby, Yorkshire, on 31 December 1917.

== Poetry ==
He had poems published in the Marlborough school magazine and then in Punch and The Westminster Gazette. His recollections of campaigning in Aden are recorded in 'Arabia,' written just before he left Aden for Palestine; it was published in Punch. His poem 'The Inn of the Sword', "A mysterious romantic ballad of a dark challenge taken up", was published in the 1917 edition. His poem 'Happy Warriors' was published in The Westminster Gazette.

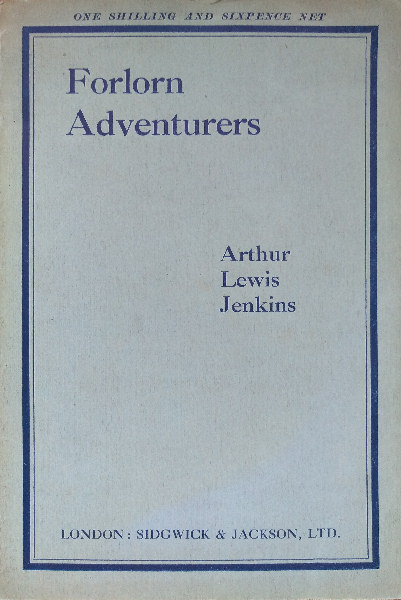

After his death his collection of poems, Forlorn Adventurers and other poems was published in 1918. His poems were included in anthologies of World War I poems, such as 'The Spirit of Womanhood', 'Outposts' in The Muse in Arms (1917), War Verse (1918) and The Valiant Muse (1936). His poem 'Sending' was published in The Children's Story of the War (1918).

Virginia Woolf, reviewing his poems in The Times Literary Supplement, wrote that he was "a poet and a sportsman who loved the wind and the sea, and would always take the fighting chance." The Western Mail, reporting his death, noted that "he, too, like the other gallant hearts that have gone before him, has found 'a fuller life'."

In his poem 'Bondage' he wrote

Oh, I am sick of ways and wars,
And the homeless ends of the earth,
I would get back to the northern stars,
And the land where I had birth.
The wine of war is bitter wine,
And I have drunk my fill;
My heart would seek its anodyne
In homely things and still.

=== Happy Warriors ===
Clear came the call; they leapt to arms and died,
As in old days the heroes prayed to do;
Great though our sorrow, greater yet our pride,
O, gallant hearts in you.

Surely they sleep content, our valiant dead,
Fallen untimely in the savage strife:
They have but followed whither duty led,
To find a fuller life.

Who, then, are we to grudge the bitter price
Of this our land inviolate through the years,
Or mar the splendour of their sacrifice
That is too high for tears....

God grant we fail not at the test—that when
We take, mayhap, our places in the fray,
Come life, come death, we quit ourselves like men,
The peers of such as they.

=== Arabia ===
An aching glare, a heat that kills,
Skies hard and pitiless overhead,
And, ever mastering lesser ills,
Sad bugles keening comrades dead;
Fever and dust and smiting sun,
In sooth a land of little ease;
Yet now my service here is done
I think on other things than these.

Dawn on the desert's shortlived dew,
Blue shadows on the silver sand,
Grey shimmering mists that still renew
The magic of the hinterland;
Sunsets ablaze with crimson fire,
Pale moons like plates of beaten gold,
Soft nights that fevered limbs desire,
And stars whereto our stars are cold;

Sharp rattling fights at peep of day,
Machine-guns searching scrub and plain,
Red lances questing for the prey,
And shrapnel puffs that melt again;
Swift shifting stroke and counterstroke,
Advance unhurrying and sure,
Until the stubborn foeman broke—
These are the memories that endure.

Heigh-ho! I would not stay – and yet,
Now that the trooper's fairly in,
With vain unreasoning regret
I turn my journey to begin;
For through the haze of dust and heat
That veils the desert and the town,
Still glimmers something strange and sweet,
The afterglow of old renown.

== Memorials ==
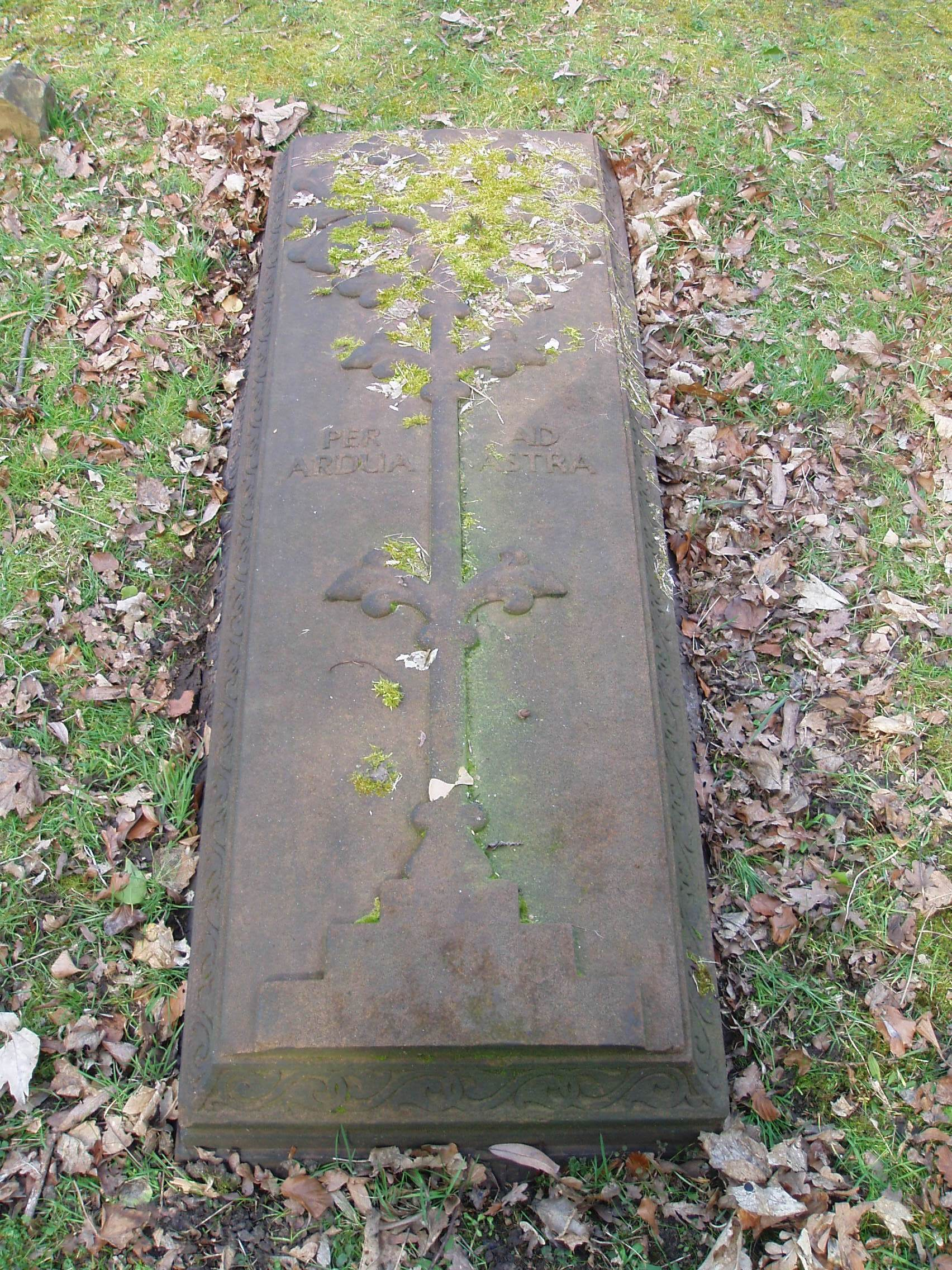
Grave of Arthur Lewis Jenkins in Richmond Cemetery.

He had a military funeral with the band of the East Surrey Regiment playing, and is buried in Richmond Cemetery next to his sister, Elinor May Jenkins (1893–1920), who was also a war poet. The inscription on his grave is "Per ardua ad astra".

He is commemorated on the memorials at the Marlborough College Memorial Hall, Balliol College, Packwood Haugh School, and St Anne's Church, Kew.

== Books ==
- Forlorn Adventurers and other poems, Sidgwick and Jackson (1918)

== Works about Jenkins ==
- Biographical note in St. John Adcock, Arthur (1920). For Remembrance: Soldier Poets who Have Fallen in the War. Hodder and Stoughton.
