= John Hutton (priest) =

17th-18th century English Priest

John Hutton was an English priest in the late 17th and early 18th centuries. Born in Sedgwick, he was educated at The Queen's College, Oxford. Hutton held livings at Hannington, Farthingstone and Wappenham. He was Archdeacon of Stow from 1683 until his death on 29 April 1712.
