= Leonard Edgcombe =

Leonard Edgcombe (died 1696) was a ship's captain with the Hudson's Bay Company who made a number of voyages into Hudson Bay and James Bay on behalf of the company. He had Henry Baley as a chief mate for a time prior to 1692 and this mariner became an important link with the area for the Hudson's Bay Company.
