= Herbert Parry =

English religious leader

Herbert Thomas Parry (1869–1940) was Archdeacon of Lindsey from 1934 until his death.

Parry was educated at Ellesmere College, Worcester College, Oxford and St Aidan's College, Birkenhead. Parry was ordained Deacon in 1893, Priest in, 1894 and began his career as Curate of St Mary and all Saints, Chesterfield. He was appointed Rector of Bigby in 1897, Proctor in Convocation in 1929 and Prebendary of Lincoln Cathedral in 1931; and held all three posts until his death on 27 October 1940;

== Notes ==
Church of England titles
| Preceded by Inaugural incumbent | Archdeacon of Lindsey; 1934 – 1940 | Succeeded by Nathaniel Gerard Railton |
