= William Spottiswoode Trevor =

Recipient of the Victoria Cross

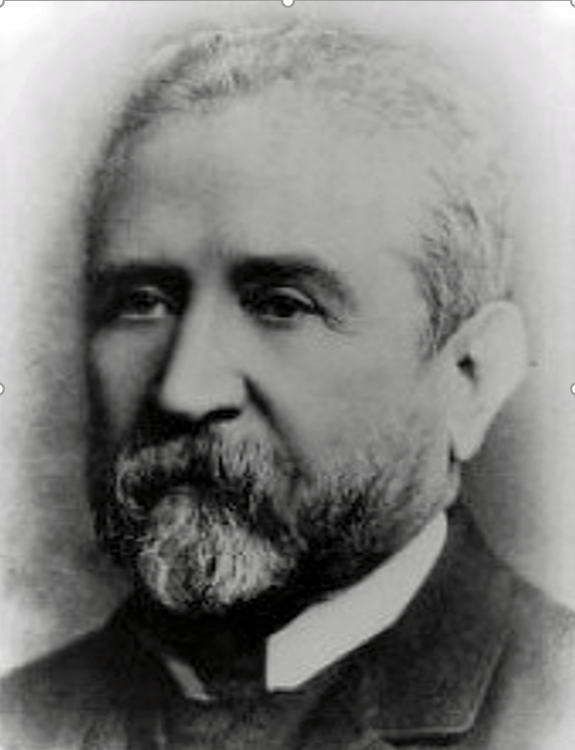
- Major-general William Spottiswoode Trevor
- Born: 9 October 1831; Calcutta, British India
- Died: 2 November 1907 (aged 76); Westminster, London
- Burial place: Kensal Green Cemetery
- Military career
- Allegiance: United Kingdom
- Branch: Bengal Army; British Army
- Rank: Major General
- Conflicts: Bhutan War; Indian Mutiny; Second Anglo-Burmese War
- Awards: Victoria Cross
- Other work: Railway administrator

Major General William Spottiswoode Trevor VC (9 October 1831 – 2 November 1907) was a recipient of the Victoria Cross (VC), the highest and most prestigious award for gallantry in the face of the enemy that can be awarded to British and Commonwealth forces.

== Details ==
Trevor was the son of Robert Salusbury Trevor and Mary Spottiswoode. His father, a captain with the 3rd Bengal Cavalry, was murdered in Kabul during the First Anglo-Afghan War, at the time of the assassination of the British Envoy, Sir William Macnaghten. Trevor, along with his mother and siblings, had accompanied his father to Afghanistan and were amongst the hostages held by the Afghans following the 1842 retreat from Kabul. They were rescued following General Pollock's reoccupation of Kabul in 1842. A younger brother was Sir Arthur Trevor.

Educated at Edinburgh Academy and Addiscombe Military Seminary, Trevor was commissioned second lieutenant in the Bengal Engineers in December 1849. After further training, he arrived in India in 1852 and took part in the Second Anglo-Burmese War, where he was twice wounded and mentioned in dispatches. After undertaking survey work in Burma, he transferred to Bengal in October 1857, where he served during the Indian Mutiny. Promoted captain in August 1858, he was then involved in engineering projects in Bengal.

In February 1865 Trevor joined the Bhutan field force as field engineer. He was a 33 years old major in the Bengal Engineers, Bengal Army during the Bhutan War when the following deed took place on 30 April 1865 at Dewan-Giri, Bhutan for which he was awarded the VC in a joint citation with Lieutenant James Dundas:

For their gallant conduct at the attack on the Block-house at Dewan-Giri, in Bhootan, on the 30th of April, 1865. Major-General Tombs, C.B., V.C., the Officer in command at the time, reports that a party of the enemy, from 180 to 200 in number, had barricaded themselves in the Block-house in question, which they continued to defend after the rest of the position had been carried, and the main body was in retreat. The Block-house, which was loop-holed, was the key of the enemy's position. Seeing no Officer of the storming party near him, and being anxious that the place should be taken immediately, as any protracted resistance might have caused the main body of the Bhooteas to rally, the British force having been fighting in a broiling sun on very steep and difficult ground for upwards of three hours, the General in command ordered these two Officers to show the way into the Block-house. They had to climb up a wall which was 14 feet high, and then to enter a house, occupied by some 200 desperate men, head foremost through an opening not more than two feet wide between the top of the wall and the roof of the Block-house. Major-General Tombs states that on speaking to the Sikh soldiers around him, and telling them in Hindoostani to swarm up the wall, none of them responded to the call, until these two Officers had shown them the way, when they followed with the greatest alacrity. Both of them were wounded.

After recovering from his wounds, Trevor became superintending engineer at the Bengal Presidency, and was made brevet major in May 1866. Promoted lieutenant-colonel in August 1874, he held a number of engineering roles in India, and in December 1875 was appointed chief engineer of British Burma, a post he held for five years. He was promoted brevet colonel on 19 August 1879, and in 1880 became director-general of Railways. He then served as secretary to the government of India in the Public Works Department from February 1882 until his retirement from the army in February 1887, with the honorary rank of major-general.

Trevor married Eliza Ann Fisher, daughter of the Reverend Henry Sanderson Fisher of the Indian Ecclesiastical Service at St Andrews Church Darjeeling, in a ceremony conducted by the bride's father, on 19 June 1858. Before Eliza died in 1863, the marriage produced 3 daughters: Mildred Charlotte Mary Trevor (1859–1860); Lylee Grace Trevor (1860–1878) and Florence Mary Trevor (1862–1934), who later married Colonel Maule Campbell Brackenbury.

Trevor died on 2 November 1907 aged 76 at his home in Westminster, London, and is buried at Kensal Green Cemetery.

His Victoria Cross is displayed at the Royal Engineers Museum, Gillingham, Kent.
