= Christopher Massingberd =

English Anglican priest

Christopher Massingberd was an English Anglican priest in the 16th-century.

Massingberd graduated LLB from the University of Cambridge. He was incorporated at Oxford in 1537.

Massingberd was Rector of Abington-juxta-Shengay from 1511 to 1515. He held the offices of Canon, Treasurer, Precentor and Chancellor of Lincoln Cathedral. He was Archdeacon of Stow from 24 August 1543 until his death on 8 March 1553.
