= John Lewis Jenkins =

British imperial administrator

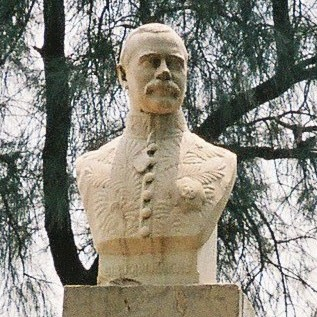
Bust of Sir John Lewis Jenkins at Coronation Park, Delhi.

Sir John Lewis Jenkins KB KCSI (22 July, 1857 - 13 January, 1912) was a British administrator in the Imperial Civil Service.

== Biography ==
He was born the son of James Jenkins of Llangadog, and educated at Wadham College, Oxford.

Jenkins joined the Imperial Civil Service in 1879. He served as Commissioner of Land Revenue and Reporter General of External Commerce in Bombay and later Commissioner of Commerce in Bombay between 1903 and 1906. He served as a Member of the Council of the Governor of Bombay between 1909–10 and held the office of Member of the Council of the Governor-General of India between 1910 and 1912. In 1911 he read the All-India address of welcome to George V at the Delhi Durbar. That same year he was made a Knight Commander of the Order of the Star of India. He died suddenly in 1912 at the age of 54 following brain trouble.

== Personal life ==
He married Florence Mildred Trevor (1870-1956), daughter of Sir Arthur Trevor, on 18 November 1890 in Karachi, Bombay Presidency, British India. Their children were Arthur Lewis Jenkins (1892–1917), Elinor May Jenkins (1893–1920), Sir Evan Meredith Jenkins (1896–1985), Joyce Angharad Jenkins (1897–1983), David Llewelyn Jenkins (1899–1969), John Vaughan Jenkins (1903–1936) and Sir Owain Trevor Jenkins (1907–1996).
