= Bill Dudman =

William Robert (Bill) Dudman ( 4 December 1925 – 29 September 1984) was Archdeacon of Lindsey from 1975 until his death.

Dudman was educated at King's College, Taunton; the University of Hull and Lincoln Theological College. After three years in the Royal Navy he was ordained Deacon in 1952; and Priest in 1953. After curacies at Shiregreen, Wombwell and Frodingham he was Industrial Chaplain to the Bishop of Lincoln from 1957 to 1971. He was Fourth Canon Residentiary of Lincoln Cathedral from 1971; and its Treasurer from 1975.

== Notes ==
Church of England titles
| Preceded by Alfred Clifford Jarvis | Archdeacon of Lindsey; 1960–1971 | Succeeded by John Harvard Christopher Laurence |
