= Robert Giles (civil servant) =

Robert Giles CIE JP (27 September 1846 – 17 March 1928) was a British civil servant in colonial Bombay.

Giles was born in Grimsthorpe, the son of Archdeacon John Douglas Giles, Canon of Lincoln and Rector of Willoughby, and Sarah Elizabeth (née Allen). His brother Edward Giles CIE was also a civil servant.

Giles was a career civil servant who was stationed only in Sind. He attended Durham Grammar School and St. John's College, Cambridge, earning his B.A. in 1869 and M.A. in 1874. He was appointed to the Sind Commission in 1868. He worked for the Bombay Revenue Survey, and was Deputy Collector, Deputy Superintendent of Police, and Educational Inspector. He served as the Chief Commissioner of Sind from 1900 to 1902. He was appointed a Companion of the Order of the Indian Empire in the 1899 Birthday Honours.

He retired in April 1902 and returned to live in Midhurst, Sussex, where he was JP for West Sussex. He died in Monte Carlo, aged 81.

Government offices
Preceded by Henry Evan Murchison James	Commissioner in Sind; 1900–1902	Succeeded by Alexander Cumine
