= Thomas Crossley Rayner =

British colonial judge (1860-1914)

Sir Thomas Crossley Rayner (19 April 1860 – 22 May 1914) was a British colonial judge who became Chief Justice of British Guiana.

== Early life ==
He was born the only son of Thomas Rayner, MD of Manchester, England and matriculated from Owen's College, Manchester in 1878. He entered the Inner Temple to study law, was called to the bar in 1882 and worked as a judge on the Northern circuit.

== Legal career ==
He became a district commissioner in the Gold Coast in 1887, a magistrate in Trinidad in 1891 and briefly Governor of Tobago in 1892, a Puisne Judge in the Gold Coast in 1894 and Chief Justice of Lagos in 1895. He then moved back to the West Indies in 1902 to become Attorney General of British Guiana, where he was elevated in 1912 to the post of Chief Justice.

He was knighted in the 1899 Birthday Honours.

He published The Laws of British Guiana in 1905.

== Private life ==
He was a member of the National Footpaths Preservation Society.

He died in Georgetown, British Guiana in 1914. He had married Agnes Harrison in Manchester in 1889. Their son, Oliver Crossley Rayner, was killed in the first World War.
