= Roy Sinker =

Michael Roy Sinker (called Roy; 28 September 1908 – 8 March 1994) was Archdeacon of Stow from 1963 to 1967.

Sinker was educated at Haileybury, Clare College, Cambridge and Ripon College Cuddesdon. He was ordained in 1933. After a curacy in Dalston he was Chaplain to the South African Church Railway Mission from 1935 to 1938. He then served at Bishop's Hatfield, Dalton-in-Furness, and Saffron Walden before his time as Archdeacon; and at St Matthew, Ipswich afterwards.

== Notes ==
Church of England titles
Preceded by Lawrence Ashcroft	Archdeacon of Stow; 1954 – 1962	Succeeded by Sidney Harvie-Clark
