= Nathaniel Railton =

English priest (1886–1948)

Nathaniel Gerard Railton (10 February 1886 – 8 September 1948) was Archdeacon of Lindsey from 1941 until his death.

Railton was educated at Keble College, Oxford; and ordained in 1912. He began his career as Curate of St John, Fitzroy Square after which he was Rector of Toddington from 1916 to 1920. He became a Chaplain to the Forces in 1920 serving at Aldershot, York, Tidworth, and Gibraltar.

== Notes ==
Church of England titles
Preceded by Herbert Thomas Parry	Archdeacon of Lindsey; 1941 – 1948	Succeeded by Lisle Marsden
