= Jane Sinclair =

Anglican Archdeacon (1956–2021)

The Reverend Canon Jane Sinclair
- Rector of St Margaret's Church, Westminster
- Church: Church of England
- Diocese: Royal Peculiar
- In office: September 2016–2020
- Predecessor: Andrew Tremlett
- Successor: Anthony Ball
- Other post: Canon of Westminster (2014–2020)
- Previous post: Archdeacon of Stow and Lindsey (2007–2014)

Orders
- Ordination: 1983 (deaconess); 1987 (deacon); 1994 (priest)

Personal details
- Born: March 1956
- Died: 14 January 2021 (aged 64)
- Denomination: Anglicanism

Jane Elizabeth Margaret Sinclair (March 1956 – 14 January 2021) was a British Anglican priest. Before her retirement in 2020, she was a Canon of Westminster from 2014, and Rector of St Margaret's Church, Westminster from 2016. She had served as Archdeacon of Stow and Lindsey between 2007 and 2014.

== Early life and education ==
Sinclair was born in 1956. After attending schools in London, New York and then Westonbirt School, she read History at St Hugh's College, Oxford and represented the university at lacrosse, graduating in 1978. Sinclair then trained for ordained ministry at St John's College, Nottingham.

== Ordained ministry ==
She was a deaconess at St Paul's, Herne Hill from 1983 to 1986; a Lecturer in Liturgy at St John's College, Nottingham from 1986 to 1993; a Canon Residentiary and Precentor at Sheffield Cathedral from 1993 to 2003. In 1995 Sinclair was elected to General Synod, and also server on the Liturgical Commission with involvement in the revision of the Psalter for Common Worship. From 2001 Sinclair was a member of the Cathedral Fabric Commission for England. Sinclair was Vicar of Rotherham Minster from 2003 to 2007; and Archdeacon of Stow & Lindsey from 2007 to 2014.

In 2014 it was announced that she would be appointed a Canon of Westminster based at Westminster Abbey, taking on the role of Canon Steward. She was installed as a canon of Westminster on 7 September 2014. In January 2016 it was announced that Sinclair would change roles within the Chapter, becoming Rector of St Margaret's from 1 September 2016.

Sinclair retired in April 2020 after five and a half years at the Abbey.

Jane Sinclair died on Thursday 14 January 2021.

== Styles ==
- 1987–2007: The Reverend Jane Sinclair
- 2007–2014: The Venerable Jane Sinclair
- 2014–2020: The Reverend Canon Jane Sinclair

Church of England titles
Preceded by Tim Ellis	Archdeacon of Stow; 2007–2014	Succeeded by Mark Steadman
