= John Giles (priest) =

Anglican priest

Archdeacon John Douglas Giles (28 November 1812 – 5 February 1867) was an Anglican priest who was Archdeacon of Stow from 1862 until his death.

Giles was born in Wedmore and educated at Corpus Christi College, Oxford. He held livings at Swinstead, Belleau and Willoughby.

In 1845, he married Sarah Elizabeth Allen. They had at least seven children, including civil servants Robert Giles CIE JP and Edward Giles CIE who both served in British India.

He died in Willoughby, aged 54.

Church of England titles
Preceded by William Stonehouse	Archdeacon of Stow; 1862–1867	Succeeded by Edward Trollope
