= Sidney Harvie-Clark =

English Archdeacon

The Ven. Sidney Harvie-Clarke (26 July 1905 – 13 February 1991) was Archdeacon of Birmingham from 1947 until 1967; and then Stow until 1975

He was educated at St Paul's School, London; Jesus College, Cambridge and Westcott House, Cambridge; and ordained in 1931. He held curacies at St Mary, Gateshead and St Mary, Portsea. He held Incumbencies in Jarrow, Edinburgh, Wishaw, and Harborne.

Church of England titles
Preceded by Geoffrey Francis Allen	Archdeacon of Birmingham; 1947 – 1967	Succeeded by Vernon Nicholls
Preceded by Michael Roy Sinker	Archdeacon of Stow; 1967 – 1975	Succeeded by David Scott
