= Byrom Eaton =

Anglican archdeacon (1613–1703)

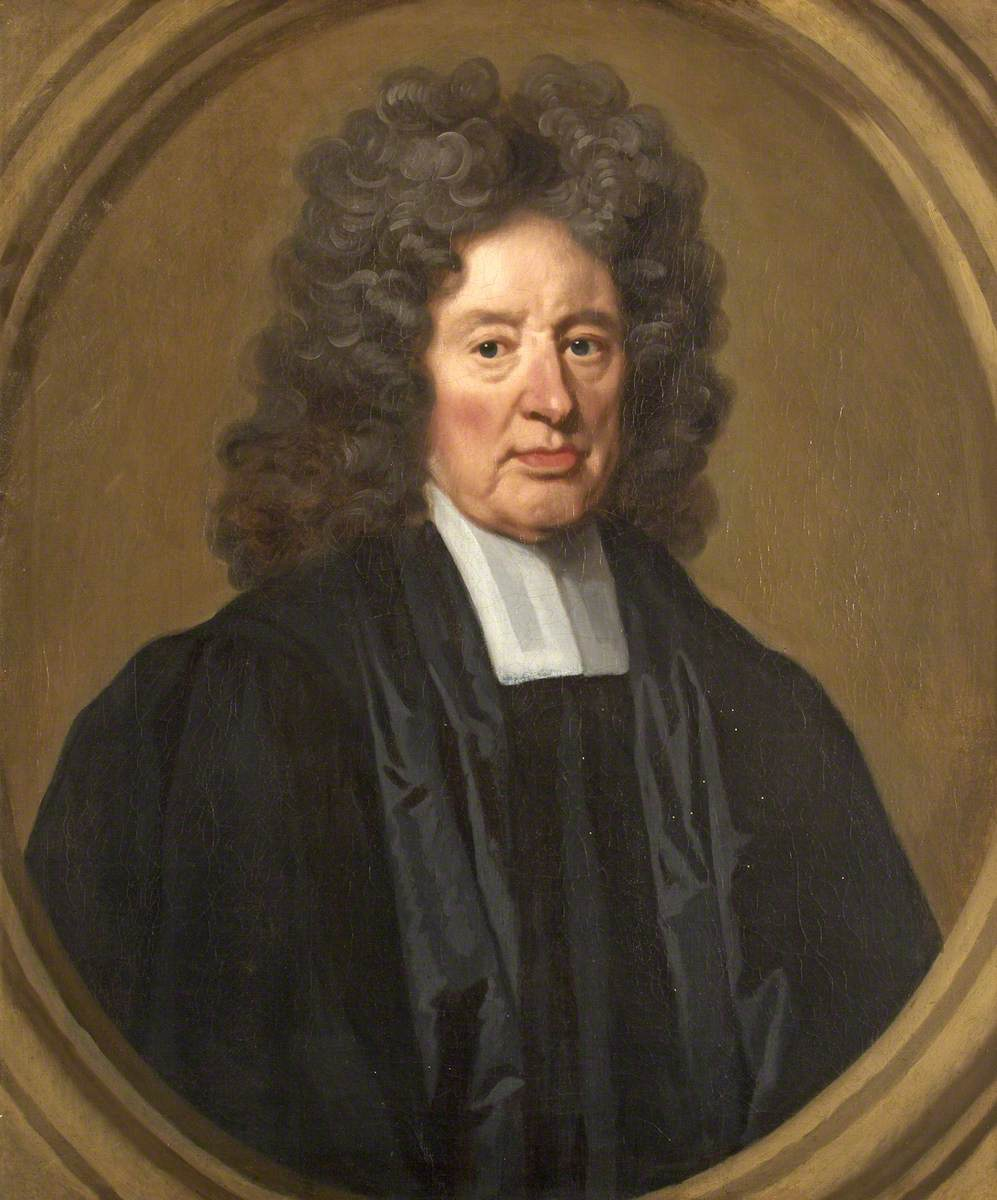
A portrait probably of Byrom Eaton

Byrom Eaton D.D. (1613–1703) was an English priest.

Eaton was born in Grappenhall and educated at Brasenose College, Oxford. He was Principal of Gloucester Hall from 1662 and 1692; and Rector of Nuneham Courtney from 1660. He was Archdeacon of Stow from 3 March 1677 until his resignation in 1683; and Archdeacon of Leicester from 1683 until his death.
