= Evan Meredith Jenkins =

British colonial administrator (1896–1985)

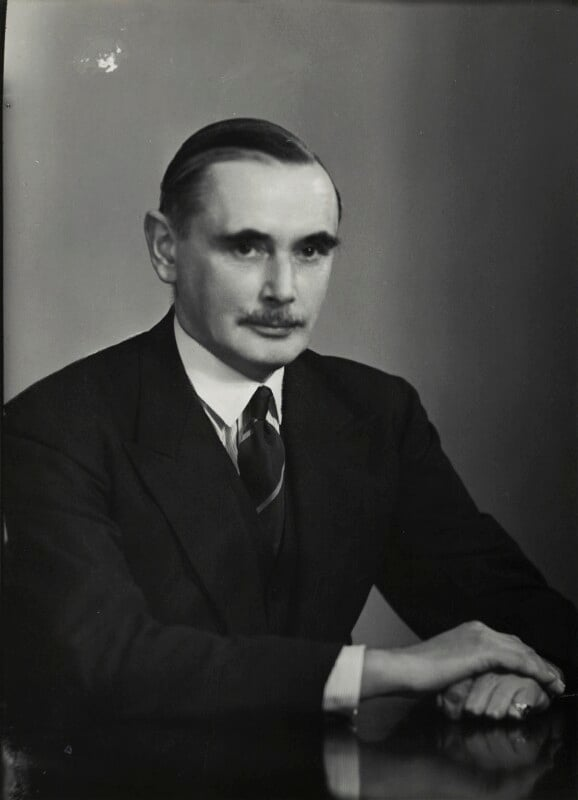
Jenkins in 1946

Sir Evan Meredith Jenkins GCIE KCSI (2 February 1896 – 19 November 1985) was a British colonial administrator and the last governor of the Punjab Province of British India.

== Life ==
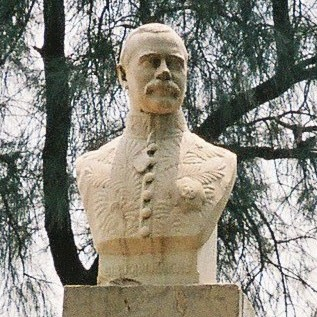
Bust of Evan Jenkins' father Sir John Lewis Jenkins at Coronation Park, Delhi.

He was a son of Sir John Lewis Jenkins and his wife Florence Mildred, second daughter of Sir Arthur Trevor, and a brother of David Jenkins, Baron Jenkins. He was educated at Rugby School and Balliol College, Oxford. He joined the Indian Civil Service in 1920 and held various posts in the Punjab commission and Central Secretariat. In 1937 he was appointed Chief Commissioner of Delhi and in 1943 he was made secretary to the Viceroy and Governor-General of India. He served as the last Governor of the Punjab in British India from 8 April 1946 to August 1947.

Due to boycotts engulfing the Punjab, on 2 March 1947 Malik Khizar Hayat Tiwana resigned as Prime Minister of the province and Jenkins, as Governor, assumed direct control of the Punjab until the day of partition, 14 August 1947.

== Sources ==
- "Sir Evan Meredith Jenkins (1896-1985), Governor of the Punjab". National Portrait Gallery (UK).
