= Roderick Wells =

English Anglican priest (1936–2025)

Roderick John Wells (17 November 1936 – 10 December 2025) was an English Anglican priest, who was Archdeacon of Stow in the Diocese of Lincoln from 1989 to 2001.

Wells was an Insurance clerk from 1953 to 1955; a Radar Mechanic in the RAF from 1955 to 1957; and an Assistant Master at Chester Choir School from 1957 to 1959. He then completed a BA at Durham University and a MA at the University of Hull. After a curacy at St Mary-at-Lambeth from, 1965 to 1971; Rector of Skegness from 1971 to 1978; Team Rector of Grimsby from 1978 to 1989; Area Dean of Cleethorpes from 1983 to 1989; Archdeacon of Stow from, 1989 to 2001, and of Lindsey from 1994 to 2001.

Wells died on 10 December 2025, at the age of 89.

== See also ==
Church of England titles
Preceded by David Scott	Archdeacon of Stow; 1989–2001	Succeeded by Tim Ellis
