= Charles Barstow Theobald =

Royal Navy officer

Admiral Charles Barstow Theobald (5 August 1843 – 25 December 1905) was a Royal Navy officer.

Theobald entered Royal Navy as a cadet in 1857, and fought in the First Taranaki War, being a member of HMS Niger's landing party which attacked the Omata stockade. For the service he was promoted and received the New Zealand War Medal.

Promoted lieutenant in 1863, he was the lieutenant of the pinnace of HMS Wasp which participated in the capture of an Arab slave ship off Zanzibar. Theobald was wounded in the action and was promoted to commander.

Theobald was promoted to captain in 1873 and rear-admiral in January 1893. Retired in August 1893, he was promoted on the retired list to vice-admiral on 13 July 1899, and to admiral in 1904.

He died in Woodbridge.
