= William Illingworth (archivist) =

English lawyer and archivist

William Illingworth (1764 – 21 February 1845) was an English lawyer and archivist, who was an active editor of the publications of the Record Commission.

== Life ==
Illingworth was the third son of William Illingworth, a tradesman in Nottingham; Cayley Illingworth was an elder brother and his nephew was Juan Illingworth. After attending Nottingham Grammar School and Manchester Grammar School, he was articled to a Nottingham attorney named Story.

By 1788 Illingworth had established himself in practice in London as an attorney of the King's Bench. His skill in deciphering manuscripts led to his being appointed 1800 a sub-commissioner on the Royal Commission on Public Records. His character impeded his later promotion.

Illingworth was elected a Fellow of the Society of Antiquaries of London in 1805. He made a general arrangement of the public records held in the chapter house of Westminster Abbey, and in 1808 drew up a press catalogue of their contents. He went with Thomas Edlyne Tomlins to cathedrals in England and Ireland to search for original statutes; and he also inspected the state of the records in Ireland. In about 1805 he was chosen deputy-keeper of the records in the Tower of London under Samuel Lysons. When Henry Petrie succeeded Lysons as keeper in August 1819, he refused to continue Illingworth's employment as deputy-keeper, offering him instead a post as a clerk: Illingworth objected and resigned.

Working as a record agent and translator, Illingworth entered Gray's Inn on 25 June 1825, but was not called to the bar. He had hopes of becoming a sub-commissioner to the sixth Record Commission, and in May 1831 drew up a set of Observations on the Public Records of the Four Courts at Westminster, and on the measures recommended by the Committee of the House of Commons in 1800 for rendering them more accessible to the public, for the private use of the commissioners: fifty copies were printed by the board. He advised the secretary, Charles Purton Cooper, but was not appointed; and Cooper made use of Illingworth's notes without acknowledgement.

In the case of Roe v Brenton, Illingworth produced from the Lord Treasurer's Remembrancer's office an extent of the assessionable manors of the Duchy of Cornwall in the reign of Edward II; and in the case of The Mayor Burgesses and Commonalty of City of Bristol v Henry Bush he brought forward rolls of the reign of Henry VI, which established the rights of the Corporation of Bristol to all the tolls on shipping coming in and out of the port. He gave evidence to the second committee of the House of Commons regarding the record commissioners on 2 March 1836.

== Later years and death ==
Before his death Illingworth became blind and fell into poverty; and a subscription was made for him by the Incorporated Law Society. He died at 13 Brooksby Street, South Islington, London, on 21 February 1845.

== Publications ==
In 1800 Illingworth published an Inquiry into the Laws, Antient and Modern, respecting Forestalling, Regrating, and Ingrossing. He transcribed and collated the Statutes of the Realm from Magna Carta to nearly the end of the reign of Henry VIII; transcribed and printed the Quo Warranto Pleadings (Record Commission, 1818) and the Hundred Rolls (Record Commission, 1812–18), and wrote the preface and compiled in Latin the subject index to the Abbreviatio Placitorum (Record Commission, 1811). With John Caley he edited the Testa de Nevill (Record Commission, 1807), and he assisted in the preparation of the first volume of the Rotuli Scotiae (Record Commission, 1814).

Illingworth's Index cartarum de Scotia, in domo capitulari Westmonasterii was privately printed in folio by Sir Thomas Phillipps at Middle Hill about 1840.

== Notes ==
Attribution

This article incorporates text from a publication now in the public domain: Lee, Sidney, ed. (1891). "Illingworth, William". Dictionary of National Biography. Vol. 28. London: Smith, Elder & Co.
