= Robert Wharton (priest) =

English priest (1751–1808)

Robert Wharton (14 June 1751 - 19 January 1808) was Archdeacon of Stow from 1791 until his death.

Wharton was born in Durham, and was educated at Eton and Pembroke College, Cambridge. He held the living at Sigglesthorne. He was Chancellor of the Diocese of Lincoln from 1801 until his death at Nettleham.

== Notes ==
Church of England titles
Preceded by John Towne	Archdeacon of Stow; 1791–1808	Succeeded by Cayley Illingworth
