= Arthur Trevor (civil servant) =

British administrator and civil servant in British India

Sir Arthur Trevor KCSI

Sir Arthur Charles Trevor KCSI (6 April 1841 – 25 October 1920) was a British administrator and civil servant in British India.

== Early life and family ==
Trevor was born in Jalalabad, the son of Robert Salusbury Trevor and Mary Spottiswoode. At the time of his birth, his father was a captain with the 3rd Bengal Cavalry serving in the First Anglo-Afghan War. His father was murdered in Kabul in the course of the war, and his family were amongst the hostages held by the Afghans until rescued during General Pollock's reoccupation of Kabul in 1842. An elder brother was William Spottiswoode Trevor, VC.

== Career ==
He was educated at St John's School, Leatherhead and Lincoln College, Oxford before joining the Indian Civil Service in 1861. He served in various customs and revenue related roles in India, before serving as the Commissioner for Sind between 1889 and 1891. In 1894 Trevor was made Companion of the Order of the Star of India.

He became a member of the Council of Bombay in 1892, and between 1895 and 1901 he served as member of the Viceroy's Council for Railways and Public Works. He was made Knight Companion of the Order of the Star of India in the 1898 New Year Honours.

== Personal life ==
In 1867 he married Florence Mary Prescott, daughter of Colonel Cyril Jackson Prescott. His daughter Florence married Sir John Lewis Jenkins, and his grandchildren included David Jenkins, Baron Jenkins and Sir Evan Jenkins.

Government offices
Preceded by Charles Bradley Pritchard	Commissioner in Sind; 1889–1891	Succeeded by Henry James
