= Edward Horace Man =

British administrator and anthropologist

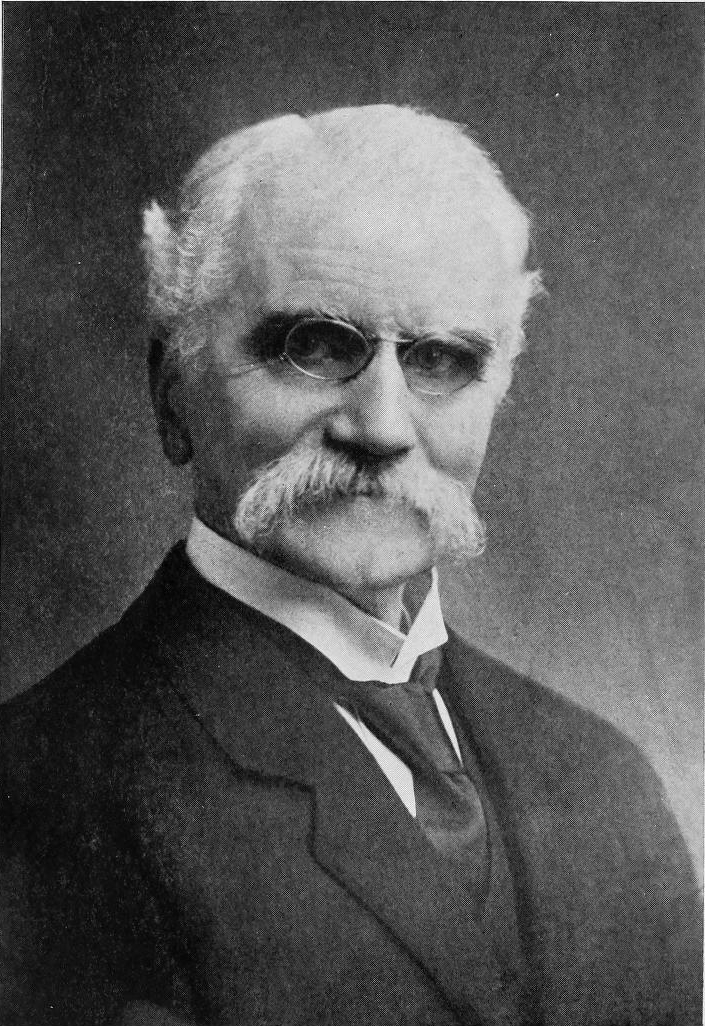
Man in 1913

Edward Horace Man (1846 – 28 September 1929) was a British administrator and anthropologist who studied the Andaman and Nicobar tribes in the 19th century. His collections of artefacts and photographs are held in the Pitt Rivers Museum.

Man was the son of Captain Henry Man of the Madras Staff Corps and Emma Martha. Captain Henry Man had helped establish the penal settlement at Port Blair and was later briefly Resident Councillor at Singapore before returning to Port Blair. Captain Henry Man took an interest in the Andamanese people and conducted some explorations of kitchen middens at some sites on the islands. Little is known of Man's early life but he joined his father in October 1869 and became an assistant superintendent at the Penal Settlement. He also served as a treasurer from 1869 to 1870 and as officer in charge of the Andaman Homes from 1875 to 1879. Between 1880 and 1882 he visited England on leave and visited various societies and passed on some of his collections to General Augustus Pitt Rivers. He also worked in the Nicobar Islands briefly. During this period he made linguistic and ethnological studies on the native people, documenting their lives with photographs. Franz Boas credits Man with having offered a slightly more nuanced ethnography of the Andamanese compared to the writings of previous travellers, including Marco Polo.

Man was influenced by correspondence with theorists like Augustus Pitt Rivers and his book Notes and Queries. Maurice Vidal Portman considered Man as the Anthropological Institute's "pet" and Henry Moseley described him as the kind of collector who might send "four or five entire Nicobar villages with all the inhabitants inside." Man retired in 1900 to England and lived at Surbiton and later Preston Park in Brighton. A monograph of his writings on the Nicobar Islands was posthumously published by his sister Amy Frances. This book The Nicobar Islands and Their People included a brief biography written by Sir David Prain. He was made CIE in 1893. His collections are distributed across museums in Cambridge, Oxford, London, Leiden, Berlin, Leipzig, Dresden, Florence, Halifax, Edinburgh, and Calcutta.
