= David Jenkins, Baron Jenkins =

British judge (1899–1969)

The Right Honourable The Lord Jenkins PC

Lord of Appeal in Ordinary

Lord Justice of Appeal

David Llewelyn Jenkins, Baron Jenkins PC (8 April 1899 – 21 July 1969) was a British judge.

== Early life and education ==
Born in Exmouth, he was the third son of Sir John Lewis Jenkins and his wife Florence Mildred, second daughter of Sir Arthur Trevor. An elder brother was Evan Meredith Jenkins, who later served as the last Governor of the Punjab.

Jenkins was educated at Charterhouse School and fought then with the 12th Battalion, Rifle Brigade (Prince Consort's Own) in the First World War. After the war, he went to Balliol College, Oxford, and graduated with a Bachelor of Arts in 1920, winning the Hertford and Ireland scholarship. Jenkins was called to the bar by Lincoln's Inn three years later and made his Master of Arts in 1928.

== Career ==
He was made a King's Counsel in 1938 and subsequently served in the Royal Army Service Corps during the Second World War. In 1945, he became a bencher and in 1946 he was nominated Attorney-General of the Duchy of Lancaster. Jenkins joined the High Court of Justice, Chancery Division in 1947 and on this occasion was created a Knight Bachelor. Two years later he was appointed a Lord Justice of Appeal and on 31 May 1949 sworn of the Privy Council. After another decade he was chosen a Lord of Appeal in Ordinary and in consequence was created a life peer under the Appellate Jurisdiction Act 1876 as Baron Jenkins, of Ashley Gardens, in the City of Westminster. He chaired the Jenkins Committee on Company Law and in 1953 became governor of Sutton's Hospital in Charterhouse.

He was unmarried and died childless. He is buried in Richmond Cemetery along with his sister Elinor Jenkins and brother.

== Arms ==
Coat of arms of David Jenkins, Baron Jenkins
Crest [On a Wreath Argent and Gules] issuant from a Circlet of Lotus Flowers and Leaves proper a Lion passant Or Escutcheon Paly of six Gules and Ermine an Orle of Leeks Or Supporters Dexter: A Wyvern Argent; Sinister: A Dragon Gules Motto Non sine jure

Legal offices
Unknown Last known title holder: Sir Herbert Cunliffe	Attorney-General of the Duchy of Lancaster; 1946–1947	Succeeded by Gerald Upjohn
