= Bihar Light Horse =

- Founded: 8 December 1862
- Disbanded: 15 August 1947
- Country: India
- Allegiance: British Raj
- Branch: Bengal Army; British Indian Army
- Type: mounted infantry
- Garrison/HQ: Muzaffarpur
- Motto(s): Nec Aspera Terrent
- Colors: Dark Blue

The Bihar Light Horse was a mounted infantry regiment of the British Indian Army. It was raised on 8 December 1862 as the Soubah Behar Mounted Rifles Volunteer Corps by indigo planters of the Tirhoot and Chapra districts in Bihar in the aftermath of the Indian Rebellion of 1857. The regiment formed a part of the cavalry reserve in the Bengal Army (until 1895) and the British Indian Army (until 1947). The regiment was disbanded on the eve of Indian independence on 15 August 1947.

The regiment was roughly equivalent to a battalion in strength (~ 400 men).

== History ==
When the Indian rebellion of 1857 broke out in India, Fred Collingridge of the Doudpur factory proposed the formation of a defence force for the British residents of Muzaffarpur. 53 Englishmen under the command of Minden James Wilson chose the civil surgeon, Dr. A. Simpson's bungalow for a defence post, calling it "Fort Pill Box" in his honour. In 1862, Collingridge and C. T. Metcalfe, a Joint Magistrate, submitted an application for the raising of a Mounted Volunteer Corps to the Commissioner of the Behar division. Sanction was obtained and on 8 December 1862, the Soubah Behar Mounted Rifles Volunteer Corps was formed. The first commandant was Major James Furlong.

The regiment was renamed the Bihar Light Horse Volunteer Corps on 29 February 1884. Its motto, adopted on 1 April 1917, "Nec Aspera Terrent" (They are not frightened of hardships). It ceased to exist as a Volunteer Corps, becoming the Bihar Light Horse Auxiliary Force, in October 1920.

=== Uniforms ===
In 1862, the uniform consisted of a light grey coat with red pipings; grey breeches with jackboots; a helmet with red plume and blue puggry; waist belt, frog, cartouche box; Cap pocket revolver case fitted on to a sword belt.

In 1875, the uniform became dark blue with white facings, white helmets, blue pantaloons with white stripes and knee boots. Hot weather uniform was white. Khaki uniforms were worn for the first time on 25 January 1894.

== Second Boer War ==
54 officers and men of the regiment were granted leave in 1900 to travel to South Africa to fight in the Second Boer War. For bravery in battle, Captain J. B. Rutherford was awarded the Distinguished Service Order. Sergeant Major C. M. C. Marsham and Corporal Percy Jones received the Distinguished Conduct Medal.

== Sources ==
- In Memory of the Bihar Light Horse, available at Bihar Light Horse
