= Henry Bayly (cricketer) =

Australian cricketer

Personal information
- Born: 19 November 1850; Dulcot, Tasmania, Australia
- Died: 7 January 1903 (aged 52); New Town, Tasmania, Australia

Domestic team information
- Years: Team
- 1870-1878: Tasmania
- Source: Cricinfo, 12 January 2016

Henry Bayly (19 November 1850 – 7 January 1903) was an Australian cricketer. He played two first-class matches for Tasmania between 1870 and 1878.

== See also ==
- List of Tasmanian representative cricketers
