= H. E. M. James =

British civil servant

Sir H. E. M. James KCIE CSI
- James in 1919

Commissioner in Sind
- In office 1891–1900
- Preceded by: Arthur Charles Trevor
- Succeeded by: Robert Giles

Personal details
- Born: Henry Evan Murchison James; 20 January 1846 Cumberland, England
- Died: 20 August 1923 (aged 77) London, England

Sir Henry Evan Murchison James KCIE CSI (20 January 1846 – 20 August 1923) was a British civil servant in the Indian Civil Service from 1865 to 1900.

He was the Commissioner in Sind from 1891 to 1900.

== Official duties ==
He formally opened Dayaram Jethmal Sind College on 15 October 1893 in Karachi.

After stepping down as commissioner, he was knighted as a knight commander of the Order of the Indian Empire in the 1901 New Year Honours List.

== Travel to China ==
In 1886–1887, James used a two-year leave to travel to China. Together with two younger Britons, the officer Francis Younghusband and the diplomat Harry English Fulford, he explored Manchuria, travelling through the frontier areas of Chinese settlement in the region and to the Changbai Mountains. He published his travel notes, and a solid dose of background information, in a book, The Long White Mountain, or, A journey in Manchuria.... Over a century later, the factual material contained in a work still served as a major source for the historians of the region.

== Named after ==
The town of Jamesabad in mirpurkhas District of Sind was named after him.

== Works ==
- H. E. M. James (1888). The Long White Mountain or A Journey in Manchuria. Longmans, Green, and Co.

Government offices
Preceded by Arthur Charles Trevor	Commissioner in Sind; 1891–1900	Succeeded by Robert Giles
