= Thomas Drummond Gilbert =

Royal Navy Admiral (1870–1962)

Admiral Thomas Drummond Gilbert, CB (né Pratt; 4 November 1870 – 24 January 1962) was a Royal Navy officer. At the time of his death, he was one of the last surviving captains in command at the Battle of Jutland.

== Life and career ==
Born Thomas Drummond Pratt, he joined HMS Britannia as a cadet in January 1884. In 1886, he went to sea as a midshipman in HMS Sultan in the Channel Squadron. He was promoted to sub-lieutenant in 1890, to lieutenant in 1893, and to commander in 1904.

During the First World War, he command HMS Yarmouth, in which he took part in the Battle of Jutland in 1916. For his services at the battle, he was commended in despatches. He was appointed a Companion of the Order of the Bath in 1918 and an Officer of the Legion of Honour the same year.

He was senior naval officer at Malta from 1919 to 1923. From 1923 to 1925, he commanded the 2nd Cruiser Squadron. He retired as a vice-admiral in 1927 and was advanced to admiral on the retired list in 1931.

He assumed the surname of Pratt in 1920.
