= Henry Baley =

Henry Baley (died 20 December 1701) was a ship's captain for the Hudson's Bay Company and became a governor of that company.

Historical knowledge of Baley shows that he was chief mate under Captain Leonard Edgcombe and had his own ship, the Prosperous, by 1692. He was involved in a number of voyages that dealt with the wresting of control of forts in the James Bay and Hudson Bay area from the French.
