= Henry Bayle =

French diplomat

Henry Bayle (30 November 1917 – 13 November 1991) was a French diplomat who notably served as the French ambassador in Trinidad and Tobago (1962–1966), Cuba (1966–1972), Pakistan (1972–1976) and East Germany (1976–1981).
