= William Cayley (MP) =

William Cayley (c.1695 — 14 February 1768), of Scampton, Lincolnshire, was a British consul in the Iberian peninsula from 1726 to 1746, Member (MP) of the Parliament of Great Britain for Dover 7 February 1752 - April 1755., and a Commissioner of Excise from 1755 to 1767.

== Family ==
His father was Simon Cayley, seventh son of Sir William Cayley, the second of the Cayley baronets.

== Spain and Portugal ==
In 1722 William Cayley went to Lisbon as secretary to Sir Thomas Saunderson, the British minister there. The following year he was appointed chargé d'affaires in Lisbon. He was British consul in Cadiz from 1726 to 1739, and then, in 1739, on the outbreak of the War of Jenkins' Ear, consul in Faro, Portugal.

There is a collection of his diplomatic correspondence from 1735 onwards in the British Library, a number of letters reporting to the Duke of Newcastle and others, including Admiral Nicholas Haddock, on ship movements and other matters of interest to the British government, particularly causes of friction between Britain and Spain.

In 1746 he sought, and obtained, permission to resign his post in Faro and return to England.

== MP and Excise Commissioner ==
In 1747 he stood unsuccessfully for Parliament for the constituency of Totnes. He sought government support for a safer seat. He was finally elected MP for Dover in 1752, with government backing. In 1754 he applied to the Duke of Newcastle for a government appointment in recognition of his work in Spain and Portugal. The following year he was appointed a Commissioner of Excise and gave up his seat in Parliament. He resigned on health grounds in early 1767.

In 1749 the manor of Scampton was devised to him by its joint coheirs. He died aged 73 in 1768 and was buried with his unmarried daughter at Ampthill, Bedfordshire. He had married and had one daughter, Sarah. He left Scampton to Richard Stonhewer with remainder to his cousins, the Cayleys of Brompton.

Parliament of Great Britain
| Preceded by Lord George Sackville; Thomas Revell | Member of Parliament for Dover; 1752 – 1755; With: Lord George Sackville | Succeeded by Lord George Sackville; Peter Burrell |
