= North Carlton, Lincolnshire =

Village and civil parish in the West Lindsey district of Lincolnshire, England

Coordinates: 53.286105°N 0.574174°W

North Carlton
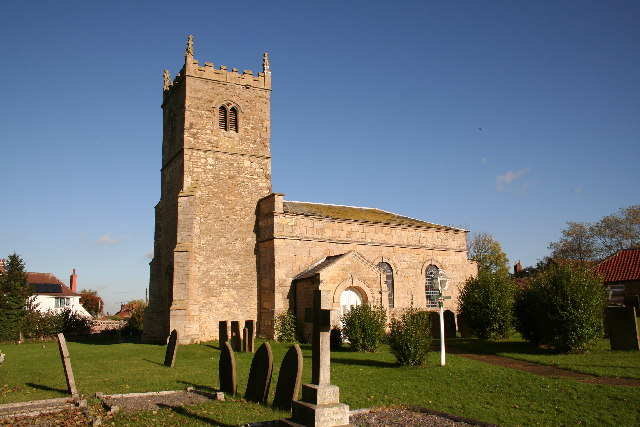
- Church of St Luke, North Carlton

- Location within Lincolnshire
- Population: 172 (2011)
- OS grid reference: SK951775
  - London: 125 mi (201 km) S
- District: West Lindsey
- Shire county: Lincolnshire
- Region: East Midlands
- Country: England
- Sovereign state: United Kingdom
- Post town: Lincoln
- Postcode district: LN1
- Police: Lincolnshire
- Fire: Lincolnshire
- Ambulance: East Midlands
- UK Parliament: Gainsborough

North Carlton is a village and civil parish in the West Lindsey district of Lincolnshire, England. The population of the civil parish at the 2011 census was 172. It is situated about 5 miles (8.0 km) north from the city and county town of Lincoln.

The church of Saint Luke is a Grade II listed building dating from the 15th century, although it was largely rebuilt in the early 1770s.

== North Carlton Hall ==
North Carlton Hall is a Grade I listed building dating from the 16th century with many alterations and additions, particularly in the 19th century.

In the 13th century the manor of North Carlton was held by William Wildeker, and was transferred to Barlings Abbey prior to 1303. The manor or grange remained in the hands of the Abbey until the dissolution, when it was granted to Charles Brandon, 1st Duke of Suffolk, who later sold it to the Monson family.
