= Albert Augustus Gore =

Irish surgeon-general

- Born: 1840; Limerick, Ireland
- Died: 10 March 1901 (aged 60–61); Shropshire, England
- Occupation: Surgeon-general
- Children: 4
- Parents: William Ringrose Gore, M.D. (father); Mary Jeners Wilson (mother)

Albert Augustus Gore CB (1840 – 10 March 1901) was an Irish surgeon-general.

== Biography ==
Gore born at Limerick in 1840, was eldest son of William Ringrose Gore, M.D., by his wife, Mary Jeners Wilson. He was educated in London, Paris, and Dublin, taking honours in science and medicine at Queen's College, Cork, in 1858, graduating M.D. at the Queen's University, Ireland, and being admitted L.R.C.S., Ireland, in 1860. He joined the army medical staff in 1861, and was appointed assistant surgeon to the 16th lancers. When the regimental service was reduced he volunteered for service in West Africa, and took part in the bombardment and destruction of the Timni town of Massougha, on the Sierra Leone river, on 10 December 1861, the attack on Madoukia on 27 December, and the storming and capture of the stockaded fetish town of Rohea on 28 December. He was mentioned in general orders for his services and for bravery in bringing in a wounded officer. In 1868, he was recommended for promotion on account of services rendered during an epidemic of yellow fever at Sierra Leone. He acted as sanitary officer to the quartermaster-general's staff during the Ashanti war in 1873, and was severely wounded in the action of 3 November near Dunquah, and again at Quarman on 17 November. After six years' service at various base hospitals and as principal medical officer of the army of occupation in Egypt (1882), Gore was appointed principal medical officer north-west district, Mhow division, central India, and afterwards in a similar position to the forces in India. In this capacity he was responsible for the medical arrangements of the Chitral and North-West Frontier campaigns of 1896 and 1897. He retired from the army in 1898, was made C.B. in 1899, and was granted a distinguished service pension.

He died at his residence, Dodington Lodge, Whitchurch, Shropshire, on 10 March 1901. He married in 1866 Rebecca, daughter of John White, by whom he had two sons and two daughters.

Gore was author of:

- ‘A Medical History of our West African Campaigns,’ 1876.
- ‘The Story of our Service under the Crown,’ 1879.
