= St Alkmund's (new) Church, Derby =

St Alkmund's Church, Derby
- St Alkmund and St Werburgh, Derby
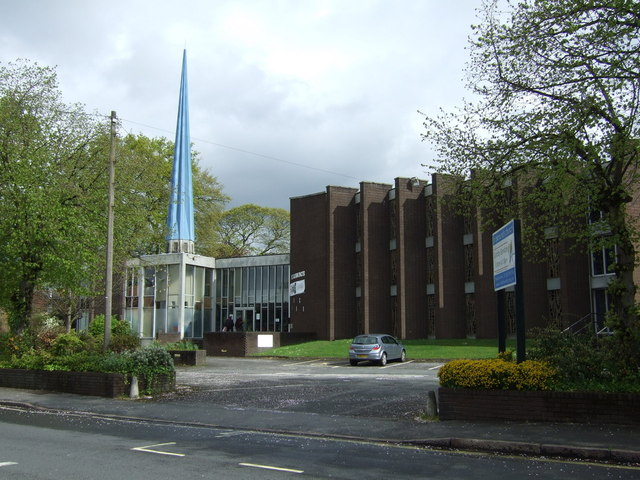

- Location within Derbyshire
- 52°55′51.7″N 1°29′08.09″W
- OS grid reference: SK 34675 37191
- Location: Derby
- Country: England
- Denomination: Church of England
- Churchmanship: Charismatic evangelical
- Website: www.stalkmunds.org

History
- Dedication: Alkmund of Derby

Administration
- Diocese: Derby
- Deanery: Derby City
- Parish: St Alkmund and St Werburgh

St Alkmund's Church is a Church of England parish church on Kedleston Road in Derby. It was built in the 1970s to replace the Victorian St Alkmund's Church which had been demolished in 1968 to enable the construction of the Derby inner ring road, St Alkmund's Way (A601).

When the Victorian church was demolished, traces of several earlier churches were revealed, stretching back to the 9th century. Artefacts found included the stone sarcophagus of Alkmund of Derby, now in Derby Museum and Art Gallery.

The new church was consecrated in 1972. The parish of St Werburgh's was combined with St Alkmund's in 1984.

In December 2017 it was announced that the incumbent Revd Canon Jean Burgess was to become the next Archdeacon of Bolton, Diocese of Manchester. In March 2020, the previous curate, James Durrant, was appointed as Associate Curate (Associate Minister) of St Alkmund's and Priest-in-Charge of St Paul's, Chester Green.

Following the death of vicar-designate Rev’d. Ian Mountford in December 2019, the church went into vacancy for a short period with Rev’d. Susie Curtis acting as Interim Associate Minister and Rev’d. Paul Desborough as curate.

On 7 November 2021 the Rev’d. Mina Munns was licensed as Vicar of St Alkmund's and works with Rev’d. James Durrant (Associate Minister). They were joined by the Rev’d. Fay Price as Assistant Curate between July 2022 and November 2025.

St Alkmund's today is an active, family-focused church who meet in the building every Sunday morning at 10am and also stream Live to their YouTube Channel. Multiple other services and activities are advertised through their social media pages on Instagram and Facebook.
