= Lorys Davies =

British Archdeacon (1936–2021)

Lorys Martin Davies (14 June 1936 – 25 February 2021) was Archdeacon of Bolton from 1992 until 2001.

== Biography ==
Davies was born on 14 June 1936, in Whitland. He received his education at Whitland Grammar School and St David's College, Lampeter. After training for ordination at Wells Theological College, he was ordained deacon in 1959 and priest in 1960. After a curacy in Tenby, he was the Chaplain at Brentwood School from 1962 to 1966; and then of Solihull School from 1966 to 1968. He was Vicar of Moseley from 1968 to 1981; a Residentiary Canon at Birmingham Cathedral from 1981 to 1992; and the Advisor to the Bishop of Manchester on Hospital Chaplaincies from 1992 to 2001

Davies died in 2021 at the age of 84.

Church of England titles
| Preceded by Bill Brison | Archdeacon of Bolton; 1992–2001 | Succeeded by John Applegate |
