= Gerald Colin =

British Anglican bishop

Gerald Fitzmaurice Colin (1913–1995) was the fourth Bishop of Grimsby in the Church of England.

== Life ==
Educated at Mountjoy School and Trinity College, Dublin, Colin was ordained in 1937. His first post was at St George's, Dublin, and after wartime service in the Royal Air Force Volunteer Reserve he became vicar of St Lawrence's, Frodingham. From 1966 he was for 13 years one of the Bishop of Lincoln's two suffragan bishops, the other being the Bishop of Grantham. He was a proctor in the Convocation of the Church of England from 1960 to 1970. Until his death he continued to serve as an assistant bishop in the Diocese of Lincoln.

== Notes ==
Church of England titles
Preceded by Kenneth Healey	Bishop of Grimsby; 1966–1979	Succeeded by David Tustin
