= Algernon Markham =

Anglican bishop, the fifth Bishop of Grantham

- Bishop of Grantham
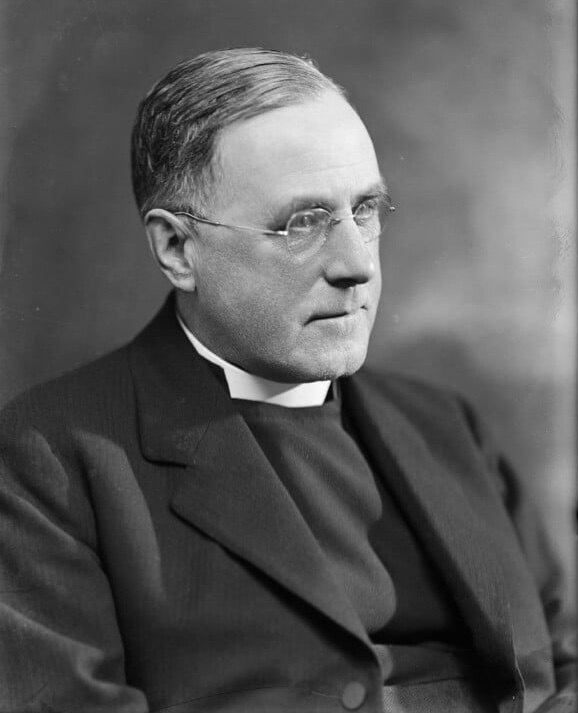
- Algernon Augustus Markham by Bassano Ltd (1937)
- Diocese: Diocese of Lincoln
- In office: 1937–1949
- Predecessor: Arthur Greaves
- Successor: Anthony Otter
- Other posts: Rector of Stoke Rochford (1933–1949); Dean of Stamford (1936–1949)

Orders
- Ordination: 1892 (deacon); 1893 (priest) by J. C. Ryle
- Consecration: 1937 by Cosmo Gordon Lang

Personal details
- Born: 15 May 1869 Saxby All Saints, Lincolnshire, United Kingdom
- Died: 27 June 1949 (aged 80) Stoke Rochford, Lincolnshire, UK
- Denomination: Anglican
- Parents: Charles & Margaret née Barton
- Spouse: Winifred née Barne
- Children: one son; four daughters
- Education: Trinity College, Cambridge

Algernon Augustus Markham (15 May 1869 – 27 June 1949) was an Anglican bishop, the fifth Bishop of Grantham (a suffragan bishop in the Diocese of Lincoln).

== Family and education ==
Markham was the fourth son of Charles Markham, Rector of Saxby All Saints (1866–1885), and of Margaret née Barton, whose family owned nearby Saxby Hall and the lordship of the manor. Algernon was born at his father's rectory, and educated at Westminster School and Trinity College, Cambridge, where he was admitted a pensioner and matriculated at Michaelmas 1888, gained his Bachelor of Arts (BA) in 1891 and Cambridge Master of Arts (MA Cantab) in 1895. He married Winifred née Barne (a granddaughter of Francis Seymour, 5th Marquess of Hertford and niece of Victor Seymour, sometime Vicar of St Stephen's, South Kensington) and they had one son and four daughters.

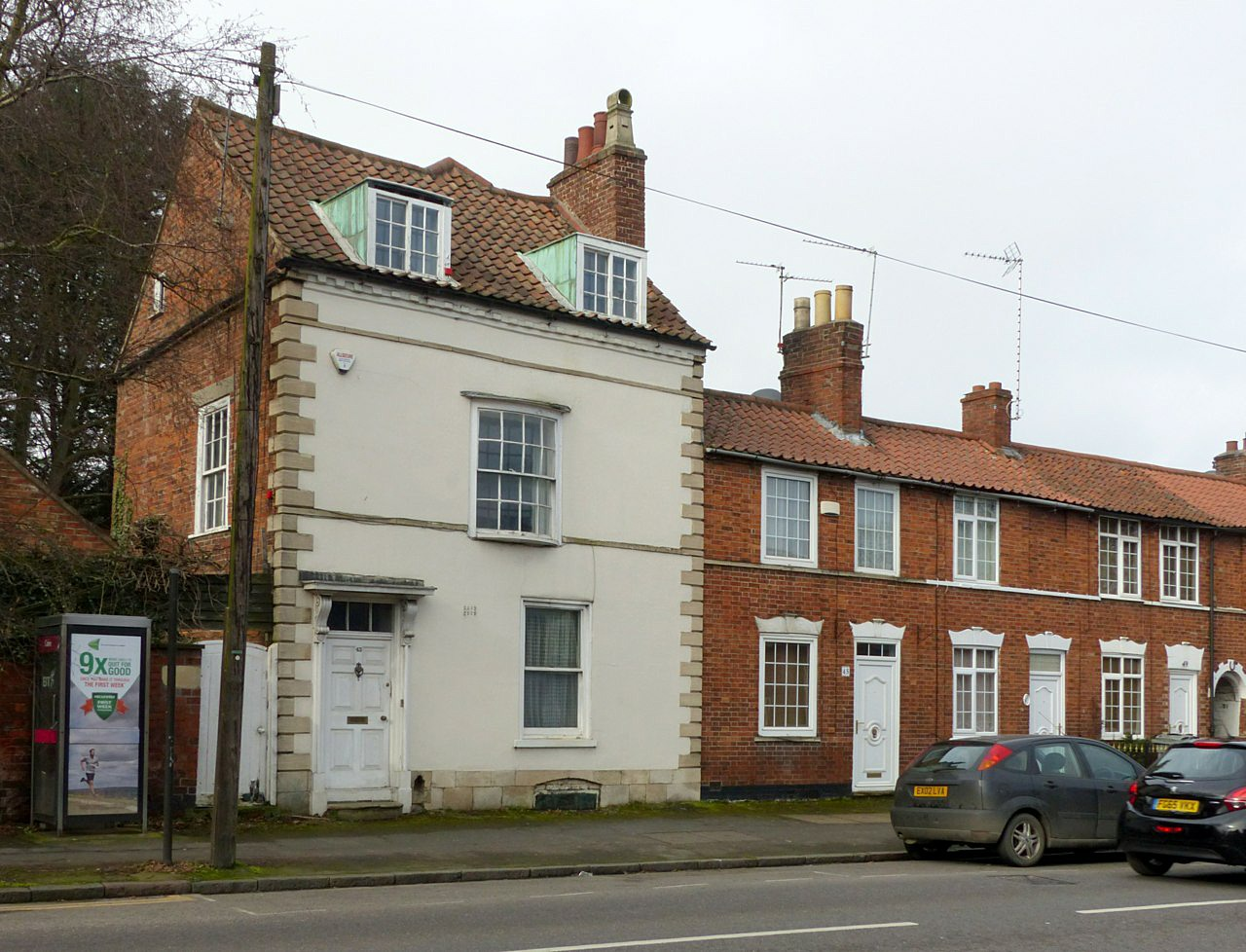
43 Manthorpe Road in February 2017

His wife died on October 30, 1967, aged 86, at Bow House in Grantham, at 43 Manthorpe Road.

== Presbyteral career ==
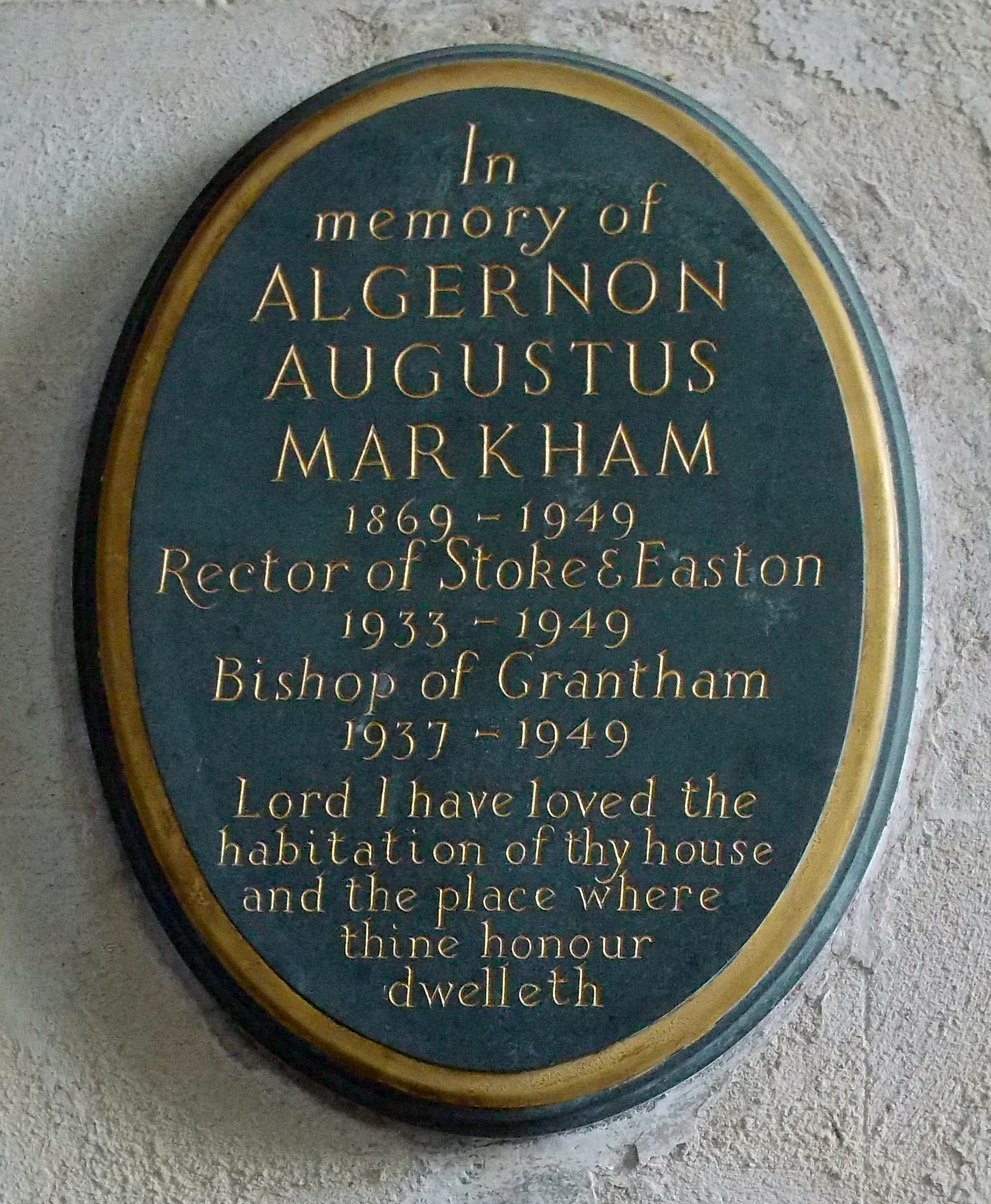
Markham's plaque at Stoke

Ordained a deacon on 12 June 1892 and a priest on 11 June 1893, (both times by J. C. Ryle, Bishop of Liverpool, in Liverpool Cathedral), his first post was as a curate in Warrington. From 1899 he was Vicar of St Jude's, Liverpool. In 1908, he married and moved to be Vicar of Grimsby, rising in time to be a Canon and Prebendary of Lincoln Cathedral from 1911 and Rural Dean of Grimsby and Cleethorpes from 1913. He moved to become Vicar of Grantham in 1928, and again served as Rural Dean (of North Grantham, 1931–1933, and of South Grantham, 1932–1933). From 1933, he was rector of St Andrew and St Mary's Church, Stoke Rochford (historically "North and South Stoke") with Easton, and he became, additionally, the incumbent (exceptionally called Dean) of Stamford at the end of 1936, before his appointment to the episcopate.

== Episcopal career ==
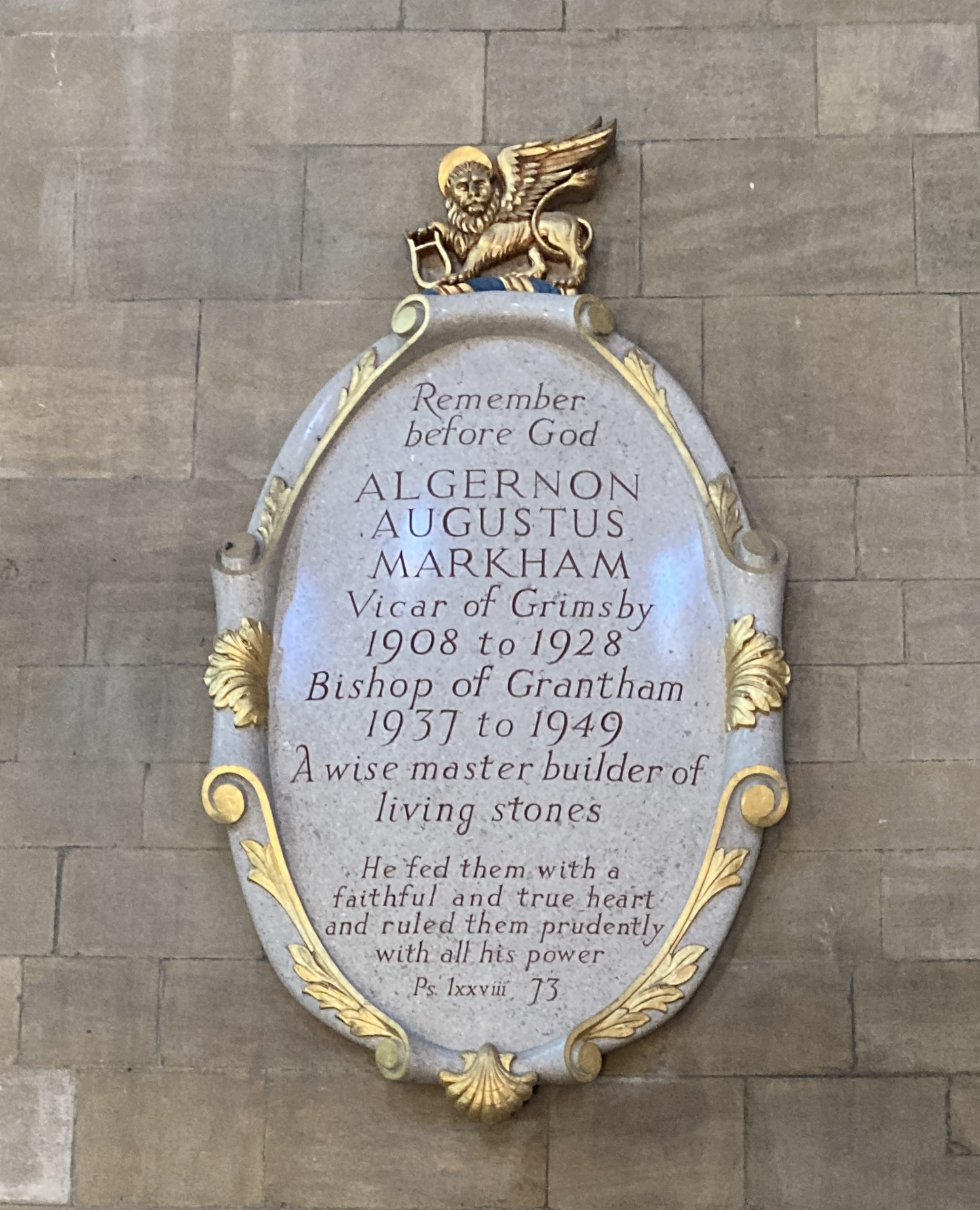
Memorial plaque to Markham in Grimsby Minster

His appointment to become Bishop of Grantham was announced on 12 November 1937 — he succeeded Arthur Greaves, who was translated to the diocese's other suffragan see, Grimsby. He took up the post with his consecration as a bishop on St Andrew's Day (30 November) by Cosmo Gordon Lang, Archbishop of Canterbury, at St Paul's Cathedral. As Bishop suffragan of Grantham, he was also appointed honorary chaplain to the diocesan Bishop of Lincoln. He died in office at his rectory in Stoke.

Church of England titles
Preceded by Arthur Greaves	Bishop of Grantham; 1937–1949	Succeeded by Anthony Otter
