= Rossdale =

Rossdale is a surname. Notable people with the surname include:

- Albert B. Rossdale (1878–1968), American politician
- David Rossdale (born 1953), British bishop
- Gavin Rossdale (born 1965), English singer, songwriter, and musician

== See also ==
- Rossdale, Edmonton
