= Jean Burgess (bishop) =

Bishop of Grimsby (born 1962)

The Right Reverend Jean Burgess
- Bishop of Grimsby
- Church: Church of England
- Diocese: Diocese of Lincoln
- In office: 2026 to present
- Predecessor: David Court
- Previous post: Archdeacon of Bournemouth (2023–2026)

Orders
- Ordination: 2003 (deacon); 2004 (priest)
- Consecration: 2026 by Stephen Cottrell

Personal details
- Born: 10 June 1962 (age 64) Derby, Derbyshire, England
- Denomination: Anglicanism
- Education: University of Nottingham

Jean Ann Burgess (born 10 June 1962) is a British Anglican bishop who has been Bishop of Grimsby (one of two bishops suffragan in the Diocese of Lincoln since 2026.

== Early life and education ==
Burgess was born on 10 June 1962 in Derby, Derbyshire, England. She was educated at Homelands School, Derby. She underwent training at the Derby School of Nursing, qualifying as a State Enrolled Nurse. She then worked a varied nursing career, first as an "intensive care of newborn nurse" (1983–1887) then as a district nurse, and finally as a nurse in GP surgery (2001–2003).

From 2000 to 2003, Burgess trained for ordination part-time on the East Midlands Ministry Training Course. She also studied theology and pastoral studies at the University of Nottingham, graduating with a Master of Arts (MA) degree in 2003.

== Ordained ministry ==
Burgess was ordained in the Church of England as a deacon in 2003 and as a priest in 2004. From 2003 to 2008, she served her curacy at St George and St Mary's Church, Church Gresley in the Diocese of Derby. She then served as interim minister, priest in charge and finally vicar of St Alkmund and St Werburgh, Derby; a charismatic evangelical church. She was also dean of women's ministry for the Diocese of Derby from 2013 to 2018.

In March 2018, she was appointed Archdeacon of Bolton in the Diocese of Manchester. She was also appointed Archdeacon of Salford effective 1 July 2020 and thereafter called "Archdeacon of Bolton and Salford". It was announced in March 2023 that Burgess was to become Archdeacon of Bournemouth in the Diocese of Winchester; she was duly collatied on 25 June 2023.

On 10 December 2025, she was announced as the next Bishop of Grimsby, a suffragan bishop in the Diocese of Lincoln. On 6 February 2026, she was consecrated as a bishop by Stephen Cottrell, Archbishop of York, during a service at Southwark Cathedral. Having legally taken up her See upon consecration, she was formally welcomed into her new diocese during as service at Lincoln Cathedral on 26 April 2026.

Church of England titles
Preceded by David Bailey	Archdeacon of Bolton and of Salford, 2020–2023; 2018–2023	Succeeded by Rachel Mann as Archdeacon of Bolton and of Salford
Preceded by Richard Brand	Archdeacon of Bournemouth; 2023–2026	TBA
Preceded by David Court	Bishop of Grimsby; 2026–present	Incumbent
