= Kenneth Healey =

Third Bishop of Grimsby

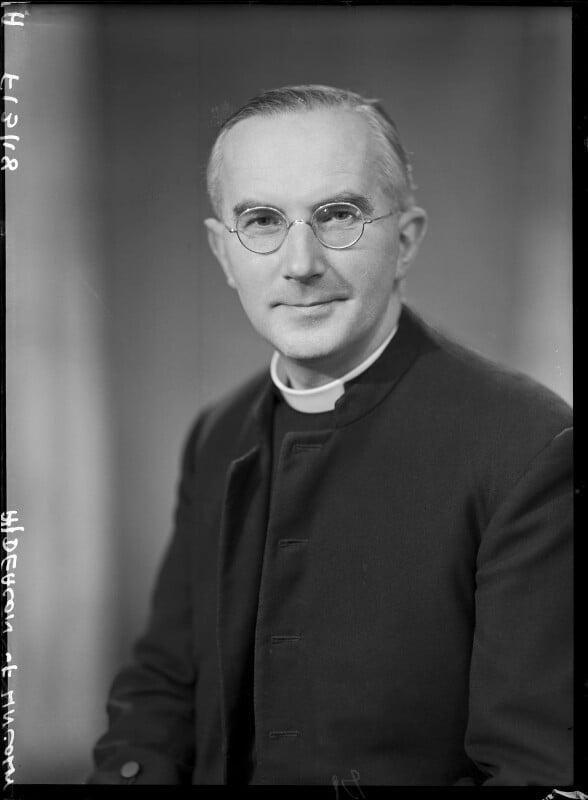
Healey in 1950

Kenneth Healey (1899–1985) was the 3rd Bishop of Grimsby, serving from 1958 to 1966.

Educated at Moulton Grammar School, he was ordained in 1932. His first post was as a Curate in Grantham after which became Rector of Bloxholm. He then served as Rural Dean of Lafford and then Archdeacon of Lincoln (1951–58). Finally, from 1966 he was one of the diocese's’s two suffragan bishops, the other being the Bishop of Grantham. Until his death he continued to serve as an assistant bishop.

== Notes ==
Church of England titles
Preceded by Arthur Ivan Greaves	Bishop of Grimsby; 1958–1966	Succeeded by Gerald Fitzmaurice Colin
