= Ernest Blackie =

British bishop

- Dean of Rochester
- Church: Rochester Cathedral
- Diocese: Rochester
- In office: 1937–1943 (d.)
- Predecessor: Francis Underhill
- Successor: Thomas Crick
- Other posts: Canon Precentor and Archdeacon of Stow (1930–1937); Bishop of Grantham (1930–1935); Bishop of Grimsby (1935–1937)

Orders
- Ordination: 1892 (priest) by Charles Ellicott (Gloucester)
- Consecration: 1930 by Cosmo Lang (Canterbury)

Personal details
- Born: 19 August 1867 Leamington Spa, Warwickshire, UK
- Died: 5 March 1946 (aged 78)
- Denomination: Anglican
- Education: University of London

Ernest Morell Blackie (19 August 1867 – 5 March 1943) was a British Anglican bishop in the 20th century.

== Early life and ministry ==
Blackie was born in Leamington Spa and educated at Cheltenham Grammar School and the University of London. Ordained priest on 13 March 1892, by Charles Ellicott, Bishop of Gloucester and Bristol, at Gloucester Cathedral, he was a curate at St Mark's Gloucester and then a minor canon at Rochester Cathedral until 1900. He later became the rector of Limpsfield and then St Paul's York Place, Edinburgh before becoming the vicar of St John the Baptist Church, Windsor and an Honorary Chaplain to the King.

== Leicester and Rochester ==
From his installation on 24 June 1921 until his 1937 move, he was Archdeacon of Stow and a residentiary canon (Canon Precentor, prebendary of Gretton) at Lincoln Cathedral. In 1930, he was additionally appointed a suffragan bishop of the Diocese of Lincoln; he was consecrated a bishop on the Feast of the Conversion of Paul (25 January) 1930 (by Cosmo Lang, Archbishop of Canterbury, at Westminster Abbey) and served five years as Bishop of Grantham. In 1935, he was then translated (within the diocese) as Bishop of Grimsby (he had taken his new See by the time of the new Grantham's consecration, 18 October 1935) before his final appointment as Dean of Rochester, a position he held from his installation on 15 December 1937 until his death in 1943.

== Marriage and family ==
In 1903 Blackie married Caroline Stewart, daughter of James Haldane Stewart Jr. and Emily Leveson-Gower of Titsey Place. Her father was the son of James Haldane Stewart senior (the 19th century ecumenical prelate) and Mary Dale, daughter of David Dale. Emily Leveson-Gower was a member of one of Britain's most aristocratic families and was a descendant of Thomas Howard, 4th Duke of Norfolk, Edmund Beaufort, 4th Duke of Somerset, Edward Seymour, 1st Duke of Somerset, Charles Brandon, 1st Duke of Suffolk, Henry Cavendish, 2nd Duke of Newcastle-upon-Tyne, Clarence, Thomas Tufton, 6th Earl of Thanet, George Plantagenet, 1st Duke of Clarence, Richard Neville, 16th Earl of Warwick or Warwick the Kingmaker William Russell, 1st Duke of Bedford and John Manners, 1st Duke of Rutland, William Cecil, 1st Baron Burghley, Thomas Cromwell, 1st Earl of Essex as well as Henry VII of England and James V of Scotland.

Blackie and his wife had five surviving children:

- John Haldane Blackie (1904–1986)
- Pauline Margaret Blackie (1906–1994) who married Charles William Fane, the son of William Vere Reeve King-Fane
- Christopher J. M. Blackie (1908–1994)
- Diana K. Blackie (1912–1917)
- Alice R. F. Blackie (1914–2002)

Church of England titles
Preceded by John Hine	Bishop of Grantham; 1930–1935	Succeeded by Arthur Greaves
New title	Bishop of Grimsby; 1935–1937	Succeeded by Arthur Greaves
Preceded by Francis Underhill	Dean of Rochester; 1937–1943	Succeeded by Thomas Crick
