= Ross Hook =

Anglican bishop

Ross Sydney Hook MC (19 February 1917 – 26 June 1996) was an Anglican bishop in the 20th century.

Educated at Christ's Hospital and Peterhouse, Cambridge, he was made a deacon on Trinity Sunday 1941 (8 June) by Cyril Garbett, Bishop of Winchester, and ordained a priest the following Trinity Sunday (31 May 1942) by Mervyn Haigh, Bishop of Winchester — both times at Winchester Cathedral. After Second World War service in the RNVR, during which he was chaplain alongside the Royal Marines at the Anzio Landings, he was appointed Chaplain of Ridley Hall, Cambridge. From here he rose rapidly in the Church hierarchy being successively Vicar of Chorlton-cum-Hardy, Rural Dean of Chelsea and a Canon Residentiary at Rochester Cathedral before being ordained to the episcopate as Bishop of Grantham in 1965. He was consecrated a bishop on 30 November 1965 by Michael Ramsey, Archbishop of Canterbury, at Westminster Abbey. He was translated to become Bishop of Bradford seven years later. Following his time in Bradford, he served at Lambeth Palace (under Robert Runcie) as Chief of Staff to the Archbishop of Canterbury (1980–1984). He lived in retirement for a few years in Romney Marsh, until a stroke caused him to move out of Kent, and died at Blandford Forum, Dorset, in June 1996 aged 79.

Church of England titles
| Preceded by Anthony Otter | Bishop of Grantham; 1965–1972 | Succeeded by Dennis Hawker |
| Preceded by Michael Parker | Bishop of Bradford; 1972–1980 | Succeeded by Geoffrey Paul |
