= Nicholas Chamberlain =

British Anglican bishop (born 1963)

The Right Reverend Dr Nicholas Chamberlain
- Bishop of Grantham
- Church: Church of England
- Diocese: Lincoln
- In office: 2015–present
- Predecessor: Tim Ellis
- Previous posts: Vicar of St George and St Hilda, Jesmond (2006–2015)

Orders
- Ordination: 1991 (deacon); 1992 (priest)
- Consecration: 19 November 2015 by Justin Welby

Personal details
- Born: 25 November 1963 (age 62) Staines, Middlesex, United Kingdom
- Denomination: Anglicanism
- Education: Christleton High School
- Alma mater: St Chad's College, Durham; Edinburgh Theological College; New College, Edinburgh

Nicholas Alan "Nick" Chamberlain (born 25 November 1963) is a British Anglican bishop. On 19 November 2015, he became the suffragan Bishop of Grantham in the Diocese of Lincoln. He had previously been vicar of the parish of St George and St Hilda, Jesmond, in the Diocese of Newcastle since 2006. Chamberlain is the first openly gay bishop in the Church of England.

== Early life and education ==
Chamberlain was born in Staines and educated at Christleton High School. He then studied English and American Literature at St Chad's College, Durham, and graduated with a Bachelor of Arts (BA) degree in 1985.

In 1988, Chamberlain entered Edinburgh Theological College, an Anglican theological college, to train for ordination. During this time he also studied theology at New College, Edinburgh (graduating with a Bachelor of Divinity (BD) degree in 1991) and undertook postgraduate research in American Literature at St Chad's College (completing his Doctor of Philosophy (PhD) degree in 1991).

== Ordained ministry ==
He was ordained deacon at Durham Cathedral in 1991. He then served in the parish of St Mary, Cockerton, in the Diocese of Durham, where he was ordained priest in 1992. He served as curate of St Francis' Church, Newton Aycliffe, in 1994 before becoming team vicar there in 1995. The team became the Great Aycliffe Team Ministry when the parish of St Andrew, Great Aycliffe was added the following year.

In 1998, he became priest in charge of St Barnabas' Burnmoor, also taking up the post of officer for Continuing Ministerial Education and Post Ordination Training in the Diocese of Durham.

On 19 November 2015, Chamberlain was consecrated a bishop by Justin Welby, the Archbishop of Canterbury.

In April 2019, he wrote an Easter devotional expressing thanks "that the silence over LGBT+ people has been broken."

In February 2026 he became acting Bishop of Lincoln following the suspension of the current bishop, Stephen Conway.

=== Views ===
In November 2023, he was one of 44 Church of England bishops who signed an open letter supporting the use of the Prayers of Love and Faith (i.e. blessings for same-sex couples) and called for "Guidance being issued without delay that includes the removal of all restrictions on clergy entering same-sex civil marriages, and on bishops ordaining and licensing such clergy".

== Personal life ==
Chamberlain was the first bishop in the Church of England to come out as gay on 2 September 2016, following threats of an outing from an unnamed Sunday newspaper. He said he was in a celibate same-sex relationship, (Note: The term "celibate relationship" is currently used in the Church of England to mean sexual abstinence; this usage is disputed. See celibacy and sexual abstinence.) as required by the bishops' guidelines, under which gay clergy must assure bishops that they are celibate and may not marry. Gay bishops are, however, permitted to enter into civil partnerships. Chamberlain also described his relationship with his partner and their commitment. "Chamberlain said he had been with his partner for many years. 'It is faithful, loving, we are like-minded, we enjoy each other’s company and we share each other’s life,' he said." Church of England Newspaper reported that he and his partner have been together for over 30 years. An overwhelming proportion of approximately 500 letters and emails prompted by his coming out were supportive.

His interests include music, reading, cycling and running; he runs in half-marathons to raise money for Christian Aid and other charities. As aforementioned, he has a partner with whom he shares his life.

== Styles ==
- The Reverend Doctor Nick Chamberlain (1991–2015)
- The Right Reverend Doctor Nicholas Chamberlain (2015–present)

== Notes ==
Church of England titles
| Preceded by Tim Ellis | Bishop of Grantham; 2015–present | Incumbent |
