= John Applegate =

British Archdeacon

John Applegate (born 1956) is a British Anglican priest who was Archdeacon of Bolton from 2002 until 2008.

He was educated at the University of Bristol and ordained in 1985. After curacies in Collyhurst and Higher Broughton he was the Rector of Lower Broughton. He was the Area Dean of Salford from 1996 to 2002; and a Lecturer at the University of Manchester from 2001. Since 2008, he has been the Director of the Learning for Mission and Ministry, Southern North-West Training Partnership.

Church of England titles
Preceded by Lorys Davies	Archdeacon of Bolton; 2002–2008	Succeeded by David Bailey
