= David Tustin =

Bishop suffragan of Grimsby from 1979 until 2000

The Rt Revd David Tustin MA(Cantab)
- Bishop of Grimsby
- Diocese: Diocese of Lincoln
- In office: 1979–2000
- Predecessor: Gerald Colin
- Successor: David Rossdale
- Other post: Honorary assistant bishop in Lincoln (2001–present)

Orders
- Ordination: 1960 (deacon); 1961 (priest)
- Consecration: 25 January 1979 by Donald Coggan

Personal details
- Born: 12 January 1935 (age 91)
- Denomination: Anglican
- Parents: John & Janet Reynolds
- Spouse: Mary Glover (m. 1964)
- Children: 1 son; 1 daughter
- Education: Magdalene College, Cambridge

David Tustin was the Bishop suffragan of Grimsby from 1979 until 2000.

He was born on 12 January 1935 and educated at Solihull School and Magdalene College, Cambridge. After a period of study at what was then Cuddesdon College (and is now known as Ripon College Cuddesdon), he was made deacon on Trinity Sunday 1960 (12 June) and ordained priest the following Trinity Sunday (28 May 1961) — both times by Stretton Reeve, Bishop of Lichfield, at Lichfield Cathedral. He embarked on an ecclesiastical career with a curacy in Stafford, after which he was Assistant General Secretary of the Church of England Council on Foreign Relations, while concurrently holding the post of Curate at St Dunstan-in-the-West, and then Vicar of St Pauls, Wednesbury. Following this he was Vicar of Tettenhall Regis from 1971–1979 which was his final appointment before his elevation to the episcopate. During his time as Vicar of Tettenhall, he served as Rural Dean of Trysull from 1976–1979. He was consecrated a bishop on 25 January 1979, by Donald Coggan, Archbishop of Canterbury, at Westminster Abbey. In retirement he continues to serve the Church as an assistant bishop within the Diocese of Lincoln. His brother-in-law was also a bishop.

Church of England titles
| Preceded by Gerald Colin | Bishop of Grimsby; 1979–2000 | Succeeded by David Rossdale |
