= Anthony Otter =

Anglican bishop who served as the sixth Bishop of Grantham, from 1949 to 1965

- Bishop of Grantham
- Diocese: Diocese of Lincoln
- In office: 1949–1965
- Predecessor: Algernon Markham
- Successor: Ross Hook
- Other posts: Dean of Stamford (1949–1971); Honorary assistant bishop (1965–1986)

Orders
- Ordination: 1925 (deacon); 1926 (priest)
- Consecration: 1949 by Geoffrey Fisher

Personal details
- Born: 8 September 1896
- Died: 9 March 1986 (aged 89) Belton, Lincolnshire, United Kingdom
- Denomination: Anglican
- Parents: Robert & Marianne
- Spouse: Dorothy
- Occupation: naval officer, missionary, writer
- Education: Trinity College, Cambridge

Anthony Otter (8 September 1896 – 9 March 1986) was an Anglican bishop who served as the sixth Bishop of Grantham (a suffragan bishop of the Diocese of Lincoln), from 1949 to 1965.

Son of Robert and Marianne, Otter was educated at Repton and Trinity College, Cambridge (he gained his Bachelor of Arts {BA} in 1920 and proceeded Cambridge Master of Arts in 1925). After wartime service with the RNVR, he completed his degree and joined the Cambridge Mission to Delhi. Upon return, he trained for the ministry at Westcott House, Cambridge and was ordained a deacon by Arthur Winnington-Ingram, Bishop of London, at St Paul's Cathedral on 20 December 1925 and a priest by William Perrin, Bishop of Willesden, at St Saviour's Hampstead on 19 December 1926.

His first post was as curate of Holy Trinity, Marylebone (1925–1931). During his curacy he was also London Secretary for SCM from 1926, and, in 1929, he married Dorothy Ramsbotham, who died in 1979. From 1931 to 1949 he was Vicar of Lowdham, serving also as chaplain of the local borstal (1931–1945), an honorary canon of Southwell Cathedral (1942–1949) and Rural Dean of Gedling (1946–1949). He was appointed Dean of Stamford, Lincolnshire (an ancient Peculiar Jurisdiction), 1949–1971) at the time of his appointment to the episcopate. He held the Deanery of Stamford jointly with the Suffragan See Diocese of Lincoln as Bishop suffragan of Grantham from his ordination and consecration as a bishop on 18 October 1949 at Southwark Cathedral by Geoffrey Fisher, Archbishop of Canterbury, until he retired in 1965. In retirement, he was licensed an honorary assistant bishop of the diocese (1965–1986). He was also a published writer. He died at home in Belton, Lincolnshire.

Church of England titles
Preceded by Algernon Markham	Bishop of Grantham; 1949–1965	Succeeded by Ross Hook
