= St Alkmund's Church, Derby =

St Alkmund’s Church, Derby
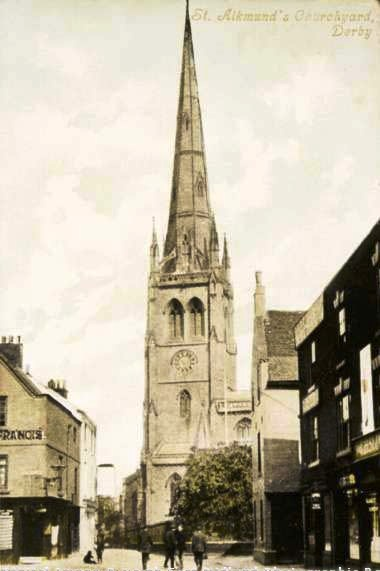
- St Alkmund’s Church, Derby in 1906

- Location within Derbyshire
- 52°55′36.48″N 1°28′42.96″W
- Location: Derby
- Country: England
- Denomination: Church of England

History
- Dedication: Alchmund of Derby

Architecture
- Architect: Henry Isaac Stevens
- Groundbreaking: 6 May 1844
- Completed: 15 September 1846
- Construction cost: £7,700 (equivalent to £776,100 in 2025).
- Demolished: 1968

Specifications
- Height: 216 feet (66 m)

Saint Alkmund's Church was a Victorian church, which stood in a Georgian square between Bridgegate and Queen Street in Derby; this was the only Georgian square in the city. The church and its yard were demolished in 1968 for construction of a road to improve traffic flow.

Churches dedicated to Saint Alkmund had been constructed on this site since the 9th century. Artefacts recovered from this site include a stone sarcophagus and remains of a 4-metre (13 ft) tall stone cross, both now held at the Derby Museum and Art Gallery.

The building was replaced with a modern church on Kedleston Road, St Alkmund’s (new) Church, Derby.

== History ==
The church was built in 1846 by the architect Henry Isaac Stevens at a cost of £7,700 on the site of several earlier churches stretching back to the 9th century all named after Saint Alkmund. It was constructed in ashlar stone in a Gothic style. Inside the church was an architectural triumph, with high pillars and stone arches. The aisle and nave were wide and the church featured a chancel. The steeple was supported by flying buttresses.

The foundation stone was laid on 6 May 1844 and the completed church was opened on 15 September 1846 by the Bishop of Lichfield.

Construction of the church caused controversy among the Catholic citizens of Derby. The 216-foot (66 m) spire was built directly in the line of sight of the Catholic St Mary's Church and, for many years, the Anglican church was referred to as "The Church of the Holy Spite". Derby painter Joseph Wright was re-buried in St Alkmund's churchyard upon completion of the building in 1846.

The church was surrounded by many two- and three-storey townhouses that lined the square and churchyard. Other buildings of interest included The Lamb Inn, opened in 1835, which featured its own brewery; a gabled sweet shop dating from the 17th century sited on the corner of the square and Bridgegate; and several shops dating to medieval times, located at the Queen Street entrance to the yard. The area was described by Sir Nikolaus Pevsner as 'A revival of 18th century unmatched, a quiet oasis.'

During the mid-1950s it was discovered that the load-bearing wood in the steeple was warping and rotting. This led to the steeple being 'capped' and the top 20 feet were removed for restoration work to be done. This was done due to structural weaknesses being found in the stonework and woodwork in the steeple itself. Plans were laid down to replace the top of the steeple, but was never completed. Along with the top of the spire, several of the Gothic detailing pieces on the roof were also removed, but no reasons for this were ever given.

== Organ ==
The previous church had an organ by Alexander Buckingham which was installed in 1825, but this was too small for the new church, so was sold by the churchwardens. A new organ was erected by private subscription at a cost of £250 (equivalent to £26,900 in 2025) and built by Forster and Andrews. It was opened on 4 November 1858. This organ was found to be inadequate, and in July 1888 it was replaced by a new instrument costing £1,200 (equivalent to £134,900 in 2025) constructed by Thomas Chambers Lewis. On 22 March 1889 the famous French organist, Alexandre Guilmant gave a recital. The organ had some modifications by John H Adkins in 1908, 1910 and 1938. A specification of the organ can be found on the National Pipe Organ Register.

=== Organists ===
- F. Fritche ca. 1843
- Josiah Davenport Norton 1858 – 1865
- William Lambe Dodd 1865 – 1887 (afterwards organist of St Peter's Church, Derby)
- Ernest William Bayley 1887 – 1903
- Norman Frederick Byng Johnson 1903 – 1907 (formerly organist of St John the Baptist Church, Beeston, afterwards organist at St Mark's Church, Swindon)
- Bernard Fowles 1907 – 1911
- F. Isherwood Plummer 1911 – 1920
- A. W. Wilford 1920 – 1927
- Leslie B. Taylor 1927 – 1933 (afterwards organist of Darley Abbey Parish)
- Frank S. Gelsthorpe 1933 – 1936
- Leslie B. Taylor 1936 – 1941 (afterwards organist of St Werburgh's Church, Derby)
- Eric G. Barringer ca. 1948
- George Moore 1959 - 1964

== Demolition and new building ==
In 1963, Derby County Borough Council announced plans to improve traffic flow in the borough of Derby. Part of this scheme was to build a road that would carve through the site of the church and the churchyard, which met with strong criticism from many Derbeians.

However, the site was issued with a compulsory purchase order and demolition began in 1968. During the works, the site of the original church was uncovered, along with a stone sarcophagus believed to be St Alkmund's and several other artefacts. These are now on display in Derby Museum and Art Gallery, together with remnants of a 4-metre (13 ft) tall stone cross carved on four sides with birds and animals, which was removed from the churchyard during the 19th century. Today, the former church site is taken over by Derby's inner ring road, called St Alkmund's Way (A601), and little trace of the church is to be found. A plaque was erected to mark the history of the church and building.

A modernistic church of the same name was built on Kedleston Road in the early 1970s to replace the original building, see St Alkmund’s (new) Church, Derby.

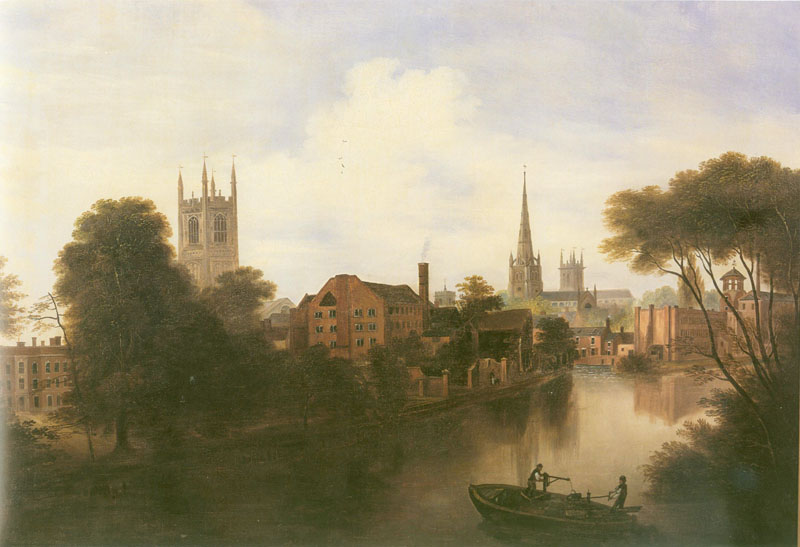
St Alkmund's Church has a spire in this painting by Robert Bradbury. This dates the painting as after 1845 and is in the collection of Derby Museum

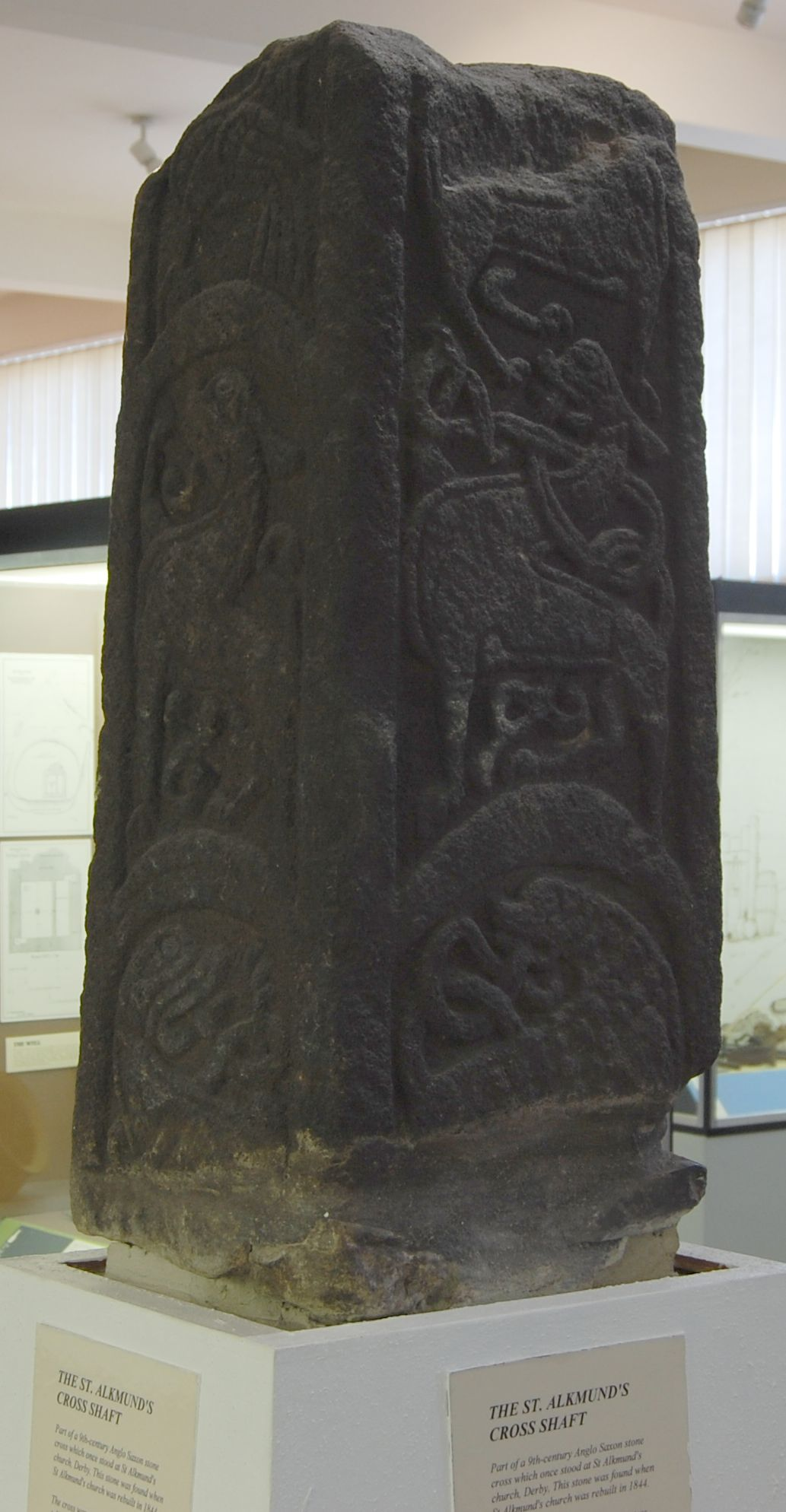
Cross shaft from St Alkmund's Church at Derby Museum and Art Gallery.

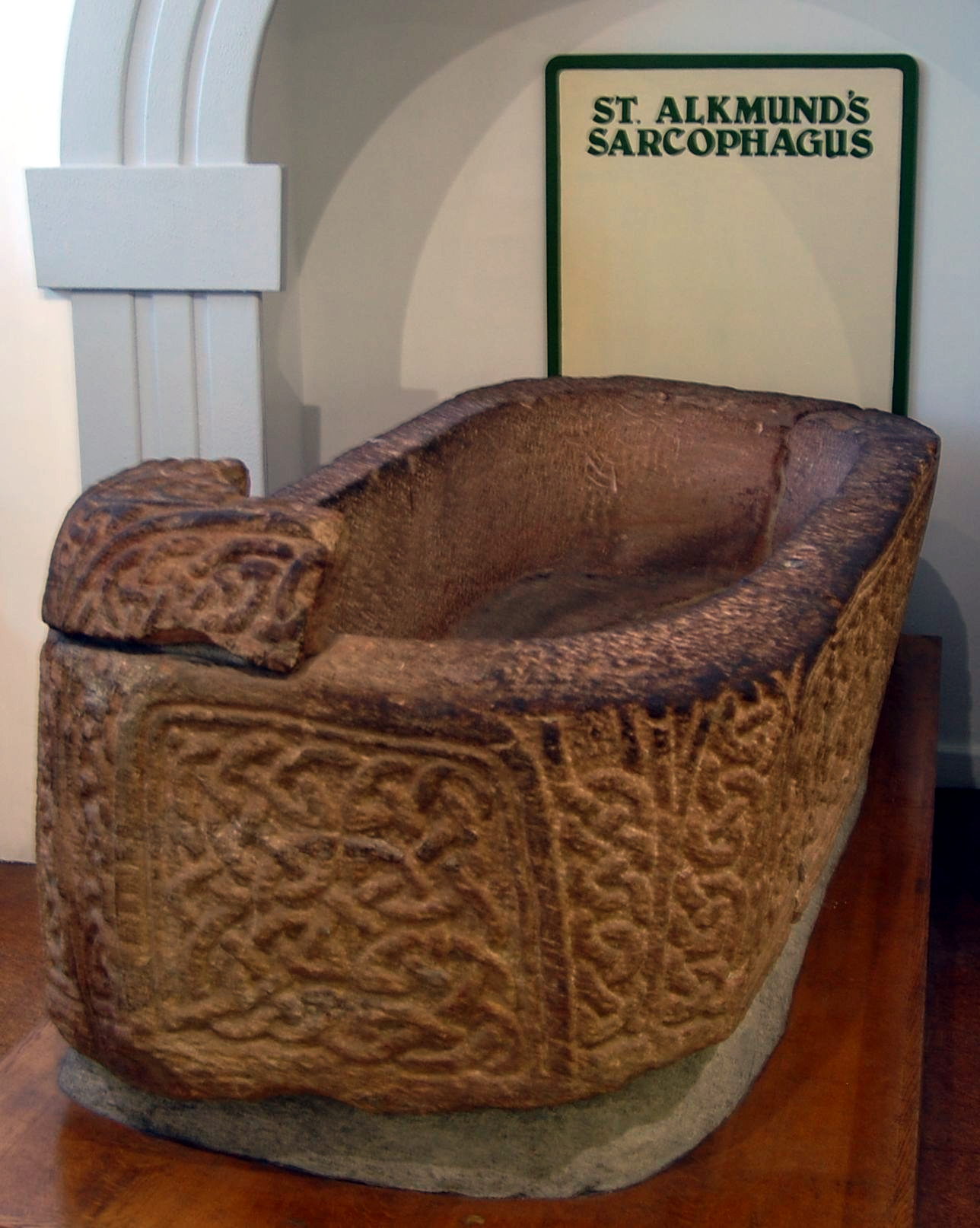
St Alkmund's Sarcophagus, at Derby Museum

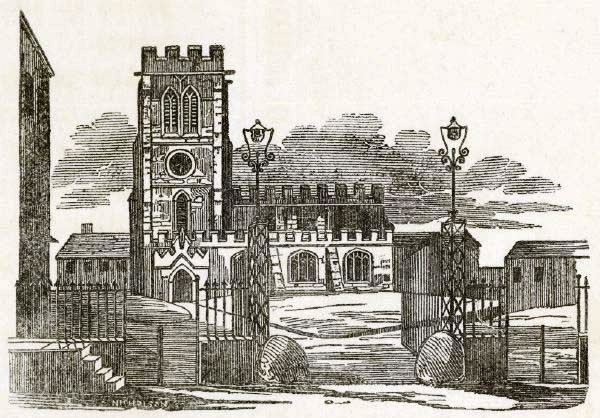
This 1750 drawing is of an older church at this site; it is from the collection of Thomas Bateman
