= Tim Ellis (bishop) =

British bishop (born 1953)

The Right Reverend Tim Ellis
- Bishop of Grantham
- Diocese: Diocese of Lincoln
- Installed: 19 February 2006
- Term ended: 26 September 2013 (retirement)
- Predecessor: Alastair Redfern
- Successor: Nicholas Chamberlain
- Other posts: Area bishop of Grantham (2010–31 January 2013); Archdeacon of Stow and Lindsey (2001–2006)

Orders
- Ordination: 1976
- Consecration: 14 February 2006

Personal details
- Born: 26 August 1953 (age 73) Yorkshire
- Denomination: Anglican
- Spouse: Susan
- Children: 3
- Education: King's College London

Timothy William Ellis (born 26 August 1953) is a retired British bishop of the Church of England. From 2006 to 2013, he was Bishop of Grantham, a suffragan bishop in the Diocese of Lincoln; he was also an area bishop from 2010 until 31 January 2013.

== Early life ==
Ellis was educated at City Grammar School, Sheffield; trained for the ministry at King's College London and at St Augustine's College, Canterbury; and took his Doctor of Philosophy (DPhil) at York University.

== Ordained ministry ==
Ordained in 1977 he began his career with a curacy in Manchester at St John's Church, Old Trafford and was then successively Vicar at Pendleton; Vicar of St Leonard, Norwood, Sheffield; Rural Dean of Ecclesfield, also Canon of Sheffield Cathedral, and finally (before his ordination to the episcopate) Archdeacon of Stow and Lindsey in the Diocese of Lincoln.

A keen Sheffield Wednesday fan and occasional blogger, he is also believed to be the first bishop to sport an earring.

Ellis was the celebrant at the first U2charist in England and organised a national vigil before the first Gulf War. He is Chair of Sheffield Faiths Together and Chair of the community-led housing organisation, East Midlands Community Led Housing Trust. He continues to serve on the Fabric Advisory Council of Sheffield Cathedral and is a member of the Advisory Panel on the Archaeology of Christian Burials in England's Standing Committee, having been vice-chair of the Council for the Care of Churches.

Ellis is now honorary assistant bishop in the Sheffield and Derby dioceses.

On 11 February 2017, Ellis was one of fourteen retired bishops to sign an open letter to the then-serving bishops of the Church of England. In an unprecedented move, they expressed their opposition to the House of Bishops' report to General Synod on sexuality, which recommended no change to the church's canons or practises around sexuality. By 13 February, a serving bishop (Alan Wilson, Bishop of Buckingham) and nine further retired bishops had added their signatures; on 15 February, the report was rejected by synod.

In December 2024, Ellis was appointed chair of the Diocesan Advisory Committee for the Diocese of Sheffield.

== Styles ==
- The Reverend Tim Ellis (1976–1998)
- The Reverend Doctor Tim Ellis (1998–2000)
- The Reverend Canon Doctor Tim Ellis (2000–2001)
- The Venerable Doctor Tim Ellis (2001–2006)
- The Right Reverend Doctor Tim Ellis (2006–present)

== Publications and articles ==
- Ellis, Timothy (1987). A History of Pendleton Church.
- Ellis, Timothy (1966). The problem of twentieth century churches. Twentieth Century Churches. York University.
- Ellis, Timothy (1993). The future of the annual conference. Churchscape, Council for the Care of Churches.
- Ellis, Timothy (1997). Leslie Thomas Moore : his life, influences, ecclesiastical architecture and preservation philosophy. University of York.
- Ellis, Timothy (2004). The theological position of the Church of England regarding the ethical curation of human remains (PDF). An annexe to the 2004 English Heritage report on the curation of human remains. English Heritage.

Church of England titles
Preceded by Alastair Redfern	Bishop of Grantham; 2006–2013	Succeeded by Nicholas Chamberlain
