= Welbore MacCarthy =

First Bishop of Grantham: 1905 until 1920

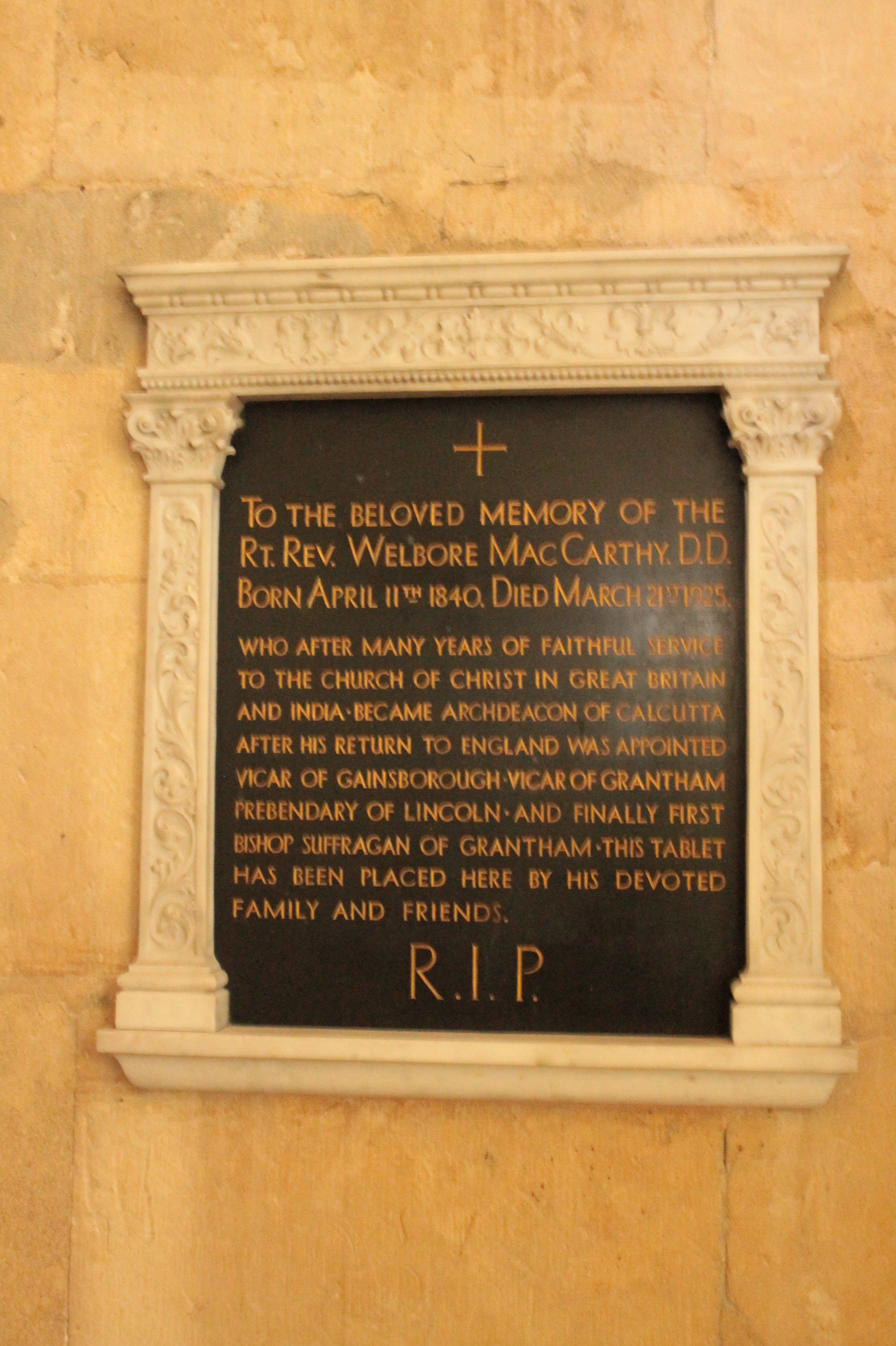
Memorial to Welbore MacCarthy. Lincoln Cathedral

Welbore MacCarthy (1840–1925) was the first Bishop of Grantham: 1905 until 1920.

== Life ==
He was born in 1840 in Cork on the southern coast of Ireland the son of Robert McCarthy (sic) and his wife Mary. They lived at Tieirs Walk in Cork with his older brothers.

He was educated at St Aidan's RC School in Birkenhead then studied Divinity at Trinity College, Dublin. He was ordained in 1868.

His first post after ordination was as a curate in Preston. From 1874 to 1898 he was a missionary priest in India, rising in time to be Archdeacon of Calcutta.

Returning to England he was Rector of Ashwell then Rural Dean of Corringham until 1905 when he was appointed to the episcopate. He was consecrated bishop on 18 October 1905 by Randall Davidson, Archbishop of Canterbury, at Westminster Abbey and served as the first Bishop of Grantham, a suffragan bishop of the Diocese of Lincoln.

He died at home, 20 Somerset Road in Ealing, on 21 March 1925. He is buried in Westminster Cemetery in Hanwell.

A memorial was erected in his memory in Lincoln Cathedral.

== Family ==
In 1872 he married Emily Fearon Delves (1847-1926).

== Notes ==
Church of England titles
Preceded by Inaugural appointment	Bishop of Grantham; 1905–1920	Succeeded by John Edward Hine
