= Fred Hoyle (priest) =

Inaugural Archdeacon of Bolton

Frederick James Hoyle (14 December 1918 – 11 February 1994) was the inaugural Archdeacon of Bolton.

He was educated at St John's College, Durham and after wartime service during World War II was ordained in 1949. He was Assistant Curate at St Paul, Withington then Curate in charge at St Martin, Wythenshawe from 1952 (Vicar from) 1960; on the Manchester Diocesan Pastoral Committee from 1965 to 1971; and then Vicar of Rochdale from 1971 until his Archdeacon's appointment.
