= David Bailey (priest) =

British Archdeacon

David Charles Bailey (born Shipley, 5 December 1952) was Archdeacon of Bolton from 2008 until 2018.

He was educated at Bradford Grammar School and Lincoln College, Oxford and ordained in 1981. After curacies in Worksop and Edgware he was the incumbent at Ellerker from 1987 to 1997; Rural Dean of Howden from 1991 to 1997; the incumbent at Beverley Minster from 1997 to 2008, and a Canon and Prebendary of York Minster from 1998 to 2008

He is a director of the Simeon Trustees, a trust established in the nineteenth century by Charles Simeon to purchase advowsons for Anglican ministers aligned with the Evangelical Anglicanism.

Church of England titles
Preceded by John Applegate	Archdeacon of Bolton; 2008–2018	Succeeded by Jean Burgess
