= Alkmund of Derby =

Prince and son of Alhred of Northumbria

Saint Alkmund
- Born: circa 770 AD
- Died: 800 AD
- Feast: 19 March

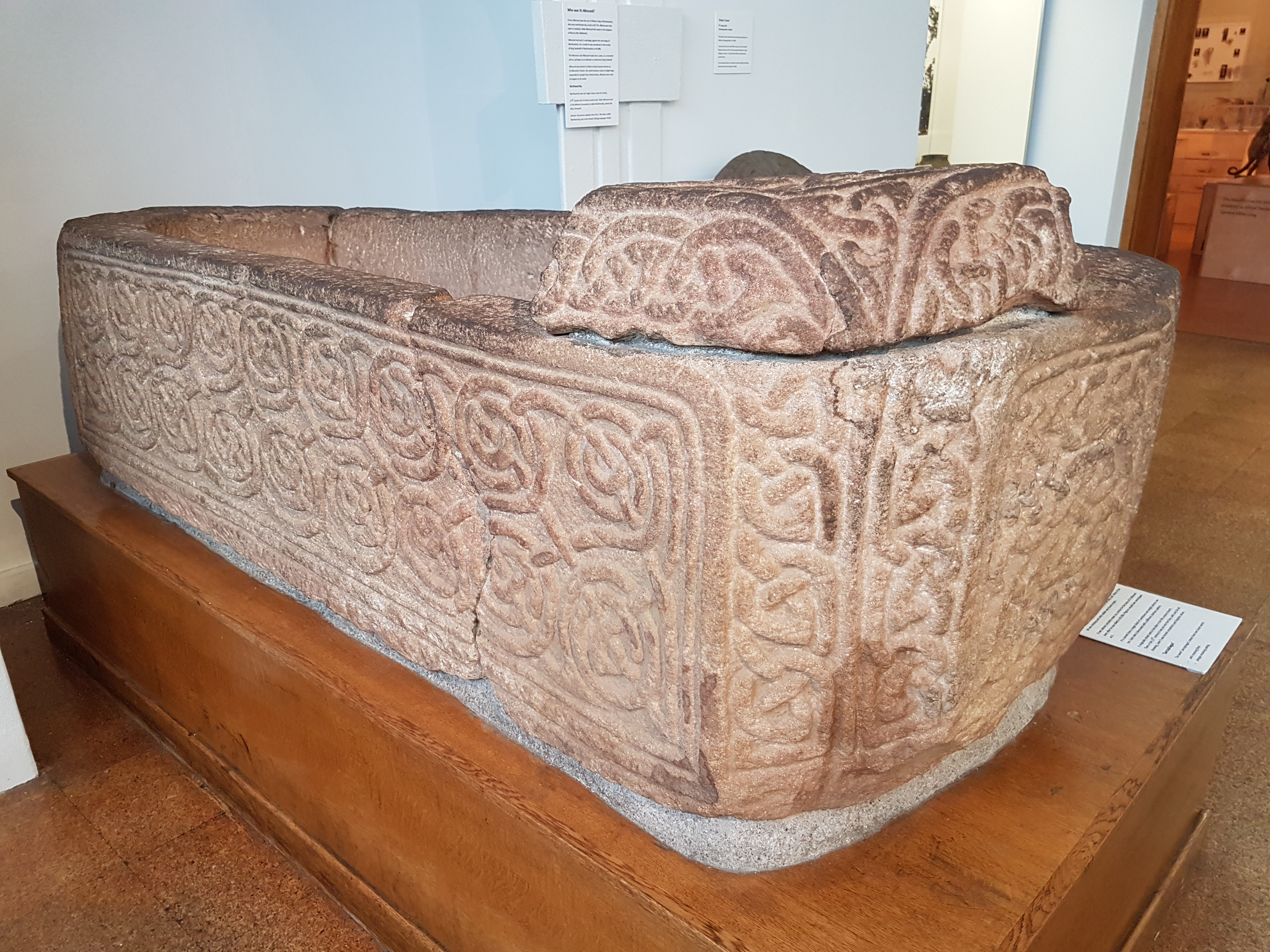
St Alkmund's sarcophagus, at Derby Museum and Art Gallery

Alkmund of Derby (or of Lilleshall), also spelt Ealhmund, Alhmund, Alcmund, or Alchmund (d. c. 800) was a son of Alhred of Northumbria, who was caught up in the kingdom's dynastic struggles.

== History ==
After more than twenty years in exile among the Picts, Alkmund returned with an army. As king, he acquired a reputation for being charitable to the poor and orphaned. He was killed about 800, for which King Eardwulf of Northumbria was held responsible. Whatever the exact circumstances, his death was regarded as a martyrdom, and Alkmund as a saint.

He was buried first in Shropshire, and then removed to "Northworthy", i.e. modern Derby, because of Viking raids.

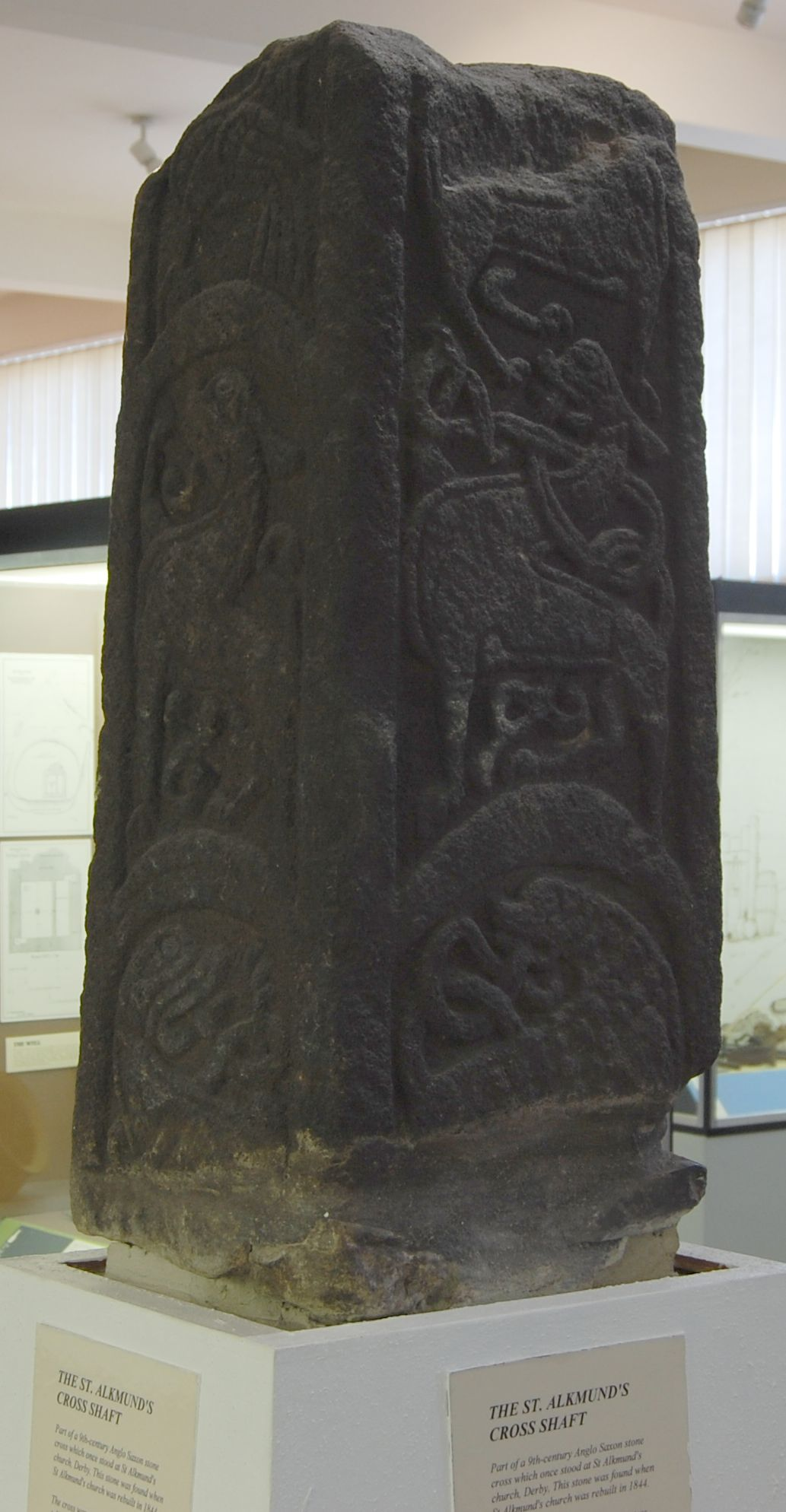
Cross shaft from the defunct St Alkmund's Church, Derby at Derby Museum and Art Gallery.

Miracles were reported at the tomb. In the early 10th century, his remains were translated to Shrewsbury, probably by Æthelflæd, Lady of the Mercians.

When St Alkmund's, Shrewsbury became the property of Lilleshall Abbey about 1145, his body was translated back to Derby.

When St Alkmund's Church, Derby was demolished in 1968, traces of several earlier churches were revealed, stretching back to the 9th century. Artefacts found included the stone sarcophagus now in Derby Museum and Art Gallery.

Six churches in England are dedicated to him, at Derby (replaced by St Alkmund's (new) Church, Derby), Duffield (Derbyshire), Shrewsbury, Whitchurch (Shropshire), Aymestrey (Herefordshire) and Blyborough (Lincolnshire).

His feast day is 19 March. However, in the Roman Catholic Diocese of Nottingham he is celebrated with a commemoration on 20 March, due to the Solemnity of St Joseph falling on 19 March.

== Gallery ==
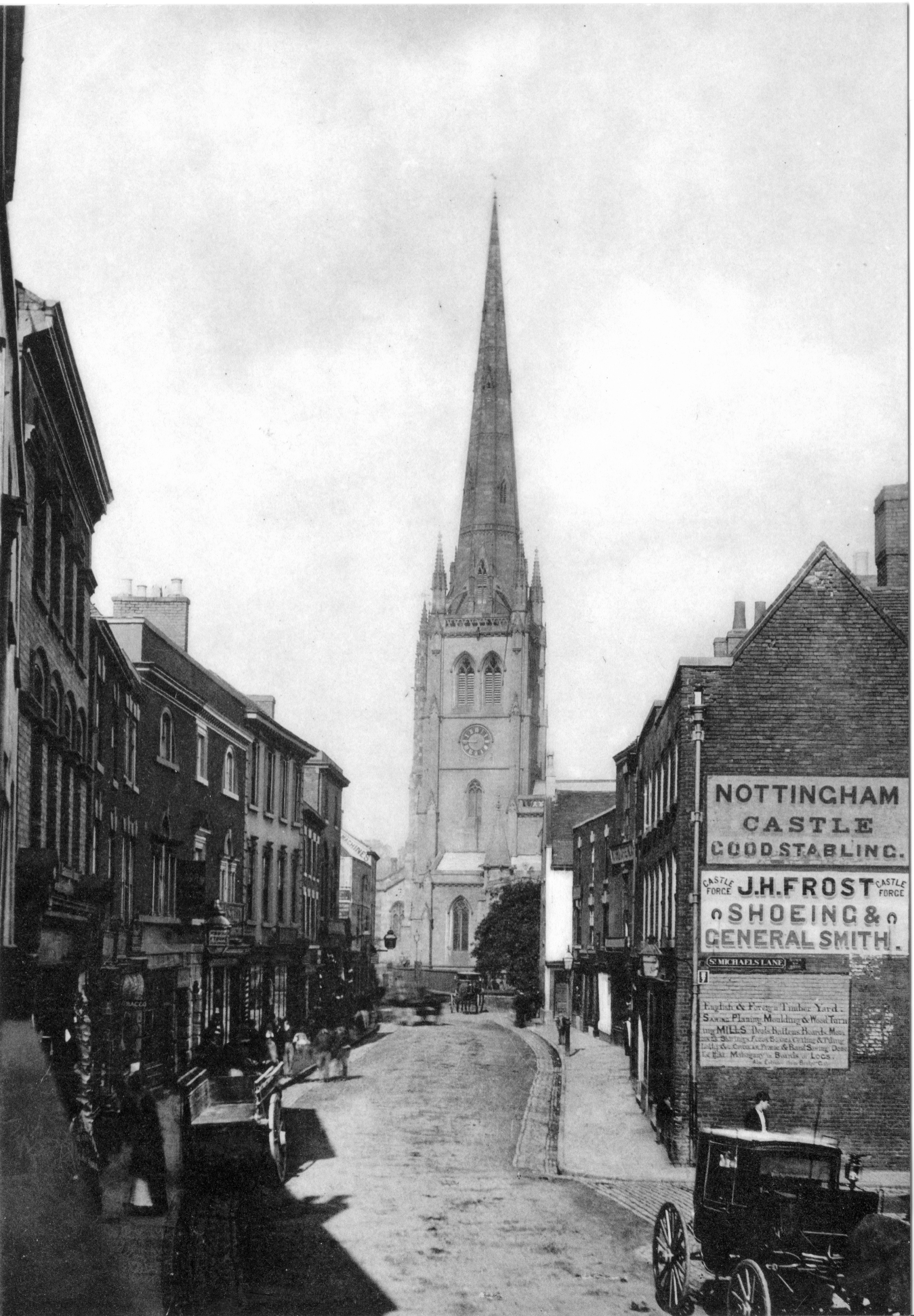
St Alkmund's Church, Derby, from Queen Street, 1882

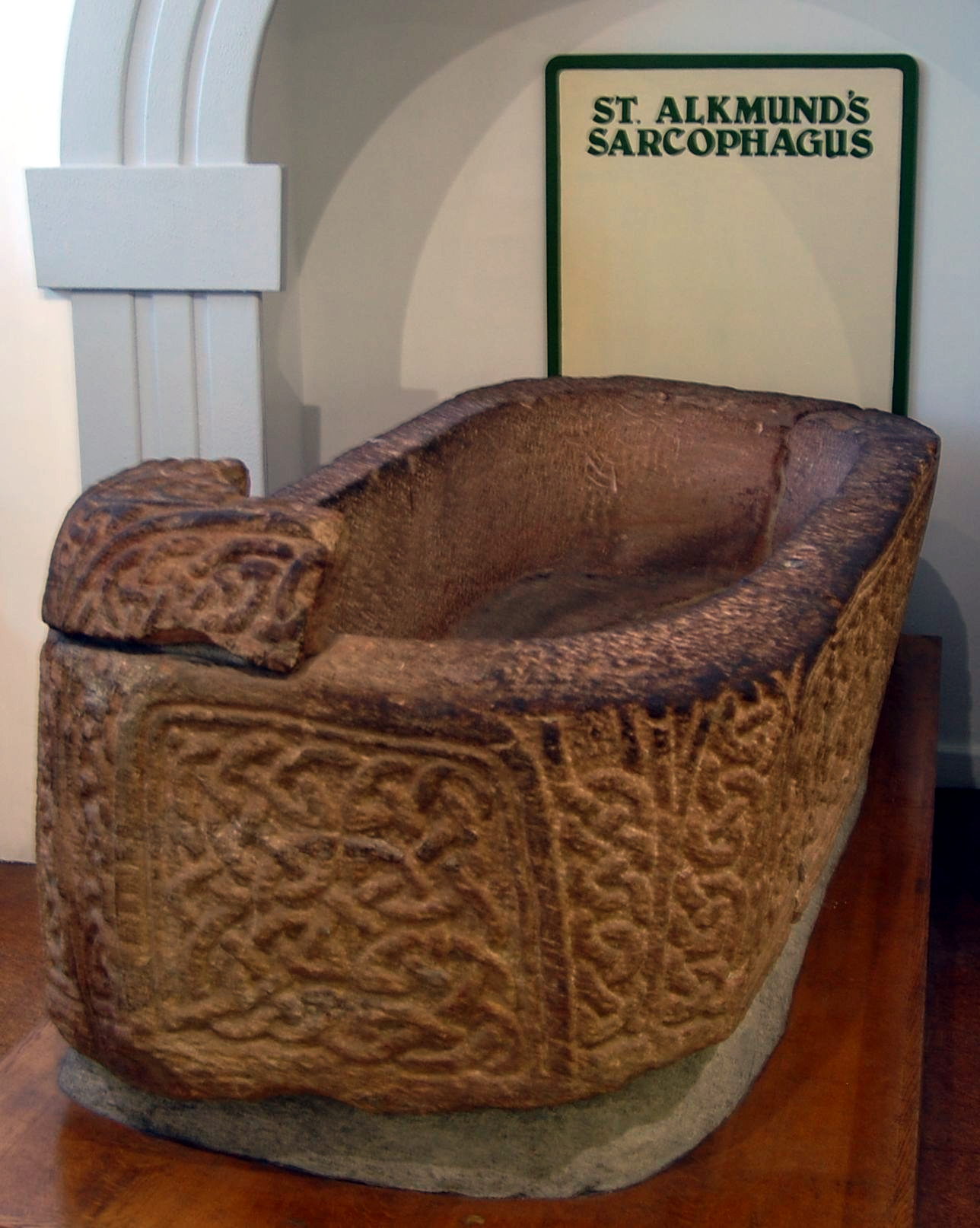
Sarcophagus of St Alkmund, Derby Museum

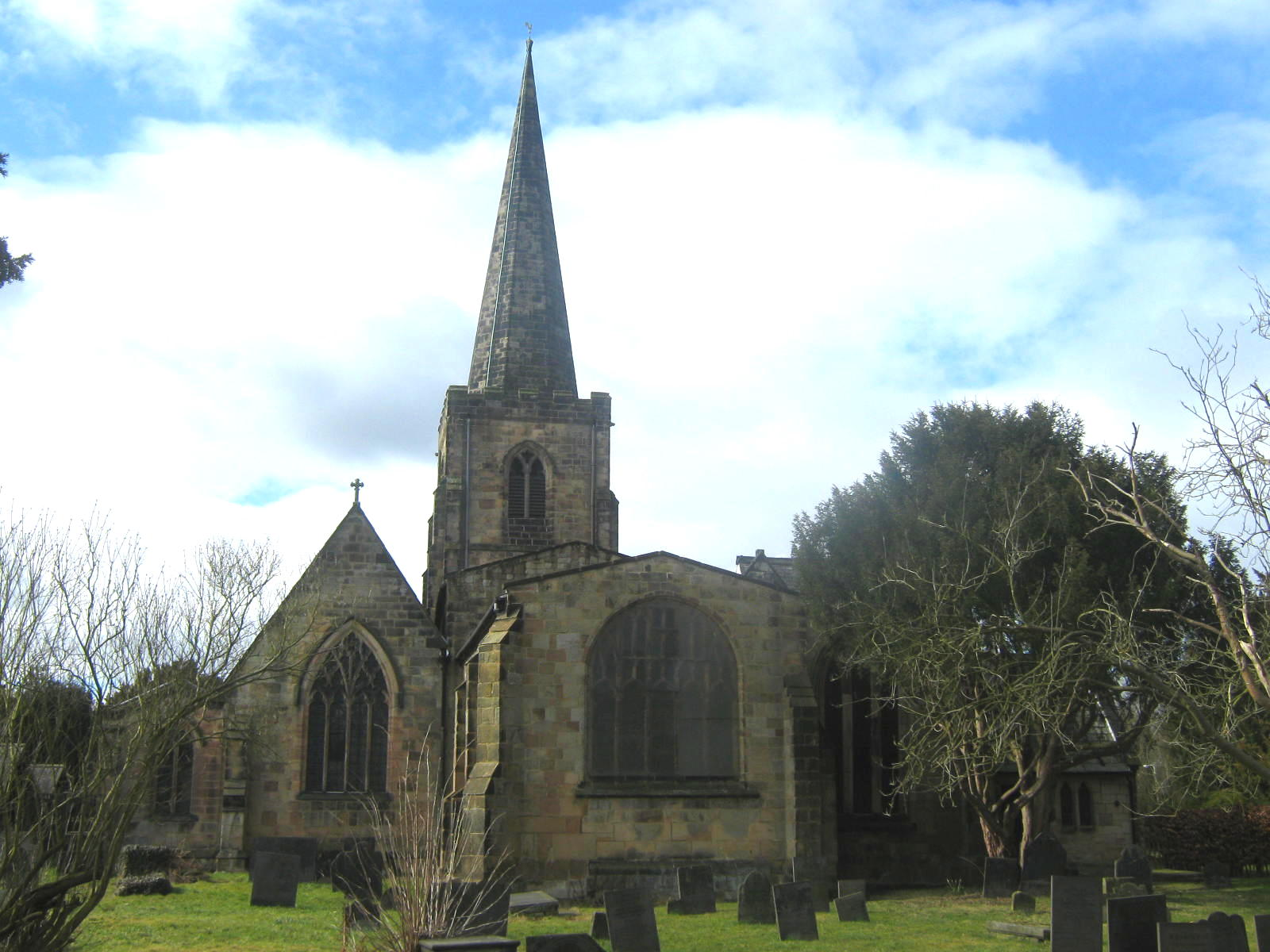
St Alkmund's Church, Duffield

== See also ==
- Alchmund of Hexham
- St Alkmund's Church, Whitchurch
