= Arthur Greaves =

Anglican bishop in the mid 20th century

- Bishop of Grimsby
- Diocese: Diocese of Lincoln
- In office: 1937–1958 (ret.)
- Predecessor: Ernest Blackie
- Successor: Kenneth Healey
- Other posts: Archdeacon of Oakham (1924–1934); Bishop of Grantham (1935–1937); Archdeacon of Stow (1937–1951)

Orders
- Ordination: 1897 (deacon); 1898 (priest) by Edward Carr Glyn (Peterborough)
- Consecration: 1935 by Cosmo Lang (Canterbury)

Personal details
- Born: 11 January 1873
- Died: 29 November 1959 (aged 86)
- Denomination: Anglican
- Education: Keble College, Oxford

Arthur Ivan Greaves (11 January 1873 – 29 November 1959) was an Anglican bishop in the mid 20th century.

He was born on 11 January 1873 and educated at Hurstpierpoint College and Keble College, Oxford. After a period of study at Ripon College Cuddesdon he was ordained: made deacon at Advent 1897 (19 December) and ordained priest the follow Advent (18 December 1898) – both times by Edward Carr Glyn, Bishop of Peterborough, at Peterborough Cathedral.

His first post was as a curate in Kettering after which became Vicar of St Mary's, Northampton before further incumbencies at Leicester and Finedon. During the First World War, he served as a Temporary Chaplain to the Forces for 15 months from June, 1917. He had been described at his interview with the Chaplain-General as 'Bright, sane, moderate, A1' and was posted to France. In September, 1918, an 'Excellent Report from BEF about his work and qualifications' was noted. He spent a year at Etaples in charge of the Military Church and 'His ability as a leader of men, his marked power as an organiser .... ‘ were praised. Although far from the front lines, Greaves could remember sheltering from German air-raids, including a 'narrow shave while waiting in a railway station, and a series of temporary sleeping quarters including a tent and a deserted bathing-machine. In September, 1918, he returned to Finedon.

He became Archdeacon of Oakham in 1924, and served until 1934 – during which time he was also a canon residentiary of Peterborough Cathedral from 1926. He first moved to the Diocese of Lincoln as Canon Residentiary of Lincoln Cathedral in 1934 (which post he retained until 1959) and Sub-Dean. He served in that diocese for the rest of his life: he was appointed suffragan bishop as Bishop of Grantham and took up his see with his consecration as a bishop on the Feast of St Luke (18 October) 1935, by Cosmo Lang, Archbishop of Canterbury, at St Paul's Cathedral. In 1937, he was translated to the diocese's other suffragan See, Grimsby; at the same time, he was appointed (as the previous bishop of Grimsby had been) Precentor of the Cathedral and Archdeacon of Stow. He was installed in those roles on 16 December 1937; he resigned as Archdeacon in 1951, and Precentor in 1959. He retired in 1958, retaining his Canonry and Precentorship until the following year, and becoming an Assistant Bishop of Lincoln until death. A keen musician, he died a year after his retirement, on 29 November 1959. His papers are housed within The National Archives.

Church of England titles
Preceded by Ernest Blackie	Bishop of Grantham; 1935–1937	Succeeded by Algernon Markham
Preceded by Ernest Blackie	Bishop of Grimsby; 1937–1958	Succeeded by Kenneth Healey
