= David Sharples =

English priest

David Sharples AKC (born 17 March 1958) is a retired priest who served as Archdeacon of Rochdale and former Archdeacon of Salford.

He was educated at King's College London and ordained after a period of study at the College of the Resurrection, Mirfield in 1983. After a curacy at St Mary the Virgin, Prestwich he was Vicar of St Anne's, Royton from 1987 to 2002; and Director of Ordinands for the Anglican Diocese of Manchester from 2002.

He retired effective 31 March 2024.

A keen supporter of Manchester City, he is married with two sons.
