= Dennis Hawker =

Eighth Bishop of Grantham

Dennis Gascoyne Hawker (8 February 1921 – 31 January 2003) was the eighth Bishop of Grantham.

Educated at Addey and Stanhope School and Queens' College, Cambridge, Hawker served in the Royal Marines during the Second World War before he was made a deacon on Trinity Sunday 1950 (4 June) and ordained a priest the next Trinity Sunday (20 May 1951) — both times by Geoffrey Fisher, Archbishop of Canterbury at Canterbury Cathedral. His first post was as a curate at St Mary and St Eanswythe's Church, Folkestone, after which he was Vicar of St Mark, South Norwood. From 1960 he was St Hugh’s Missioner for the Diocese of Lincoln and later became Vicar of St Mary and St James, Great Grimsby before appointment to the episcopate. He was consecrated by Michael Ramsey, Archbishop of Canterbury, on 29 September 1972 at Westminster Abbey; he died on 31 January 2003.

Church of England titles
Preceded by Ross Hook	Bishop of Grantham; 1972–1987	Succeeded by Bill Ind
