= David Court (bishop) =

British Anglican bishop

The Right Reverend David Court
- Bishop of Grimsby
- Diocese: Diocese of Lincoln
- In office: 2014–2025
- Predecessor: David Rossdale
- Successor: Jean Burgess
- Other posts: Rural dean of Repps and an honorary canon of Norwich Cathedral (2010–2014); Vicar of Cromer (2003–2014)

Orders
- Ordination: 7 July 1991 (deacon) by Paul Barber; 5 July 1992 (priest) by Bill Westwood
- Consecration: 25 July 2014 by Justin Welby

Personal details
- Born: 16 October 1958 (age 67) Norwich, Norfolk, United Kingdom
- Denomination: Anglican
- Spouse: Ann
- Children: 3
- Profession: former teacher
- Education: University of Southampton

David Eric Court (born 16 October 1958) is a British Anglican retired bishop. He served as the Bishop suffragan of Grimsby in the Church of England Diocese of Lincoln from 2014 until his retirement in 2025. He twice served as acting Bishop of Lincoln between May 2019 and February 2021 and in 2023.

== Early life ==
Court was born on 16 October 1958 in Norwich, England. He was educated at a comprehensive school in Norwich. He went on to study electrochemistry at the University of Southampton, graduating with a Bachelor of Science (BSc) degree in 1980 and a Doctor of Philosophy (PhD) degree in 1983. His doctoral thesis was titled "Some electrochemical studies in large molecules", and related to the medicinal opportunities of sugar. He then remained Southampton to undertake teacher training, and completed his Postgraduate Certificate in Education (PGCE) in 1984.

From 1984 to 1988, Court taught chemistry and physics at Prince William School, a secondary school in Oundle, Northamptonshire. Having become a committed Christian while at university, he left teaching and entered Oak Hill Theological College, a conservative evangelical theological college in London. He graduated with a Bachelor of Arts (BA) degree in 1991.

== Ordained ministry ==
Court was made a deacon at Petertide 1991 (7 July) by Paul Barber, Bishop of Brixworth; and ordained a priest the following Petertide (5 July 1992) by Bill Westwood, Bishop of Peterborough — both times at Peterborough Cathedral. Court served his title (curacy) in Barton Seagrave; from 1994 to 1997, he served a second curacy in Kinson before moving to become Vicar of Mile Cross, Norwich. He then moved to become Vicar of Cromer in 2003; while remaining in which post, he became Rural Dean of Repps and an honorary canon of Norwich Cathedral in 2010.

=== Episcopal ministry ===
On 9 May 2014, it was announced that Court had been appointed Bishop of Grimsby in the Diocese of Lincoln. He was duly consecrated by Justin Welby, Archbishop of Canterbury on 25 July 2014 at St Paul's Cathedral, London and installed at Lincoln Cathedral on 27 July 2014.

Between May 2019 and February 2021, during the suspension of the Bishop of Lincoln (Christopher Lowson), Court served as acting diocesan bishop of the Diocese of Lincoln. He was also acting Bishop of Lincoln in 2023, during the interregnum, in succession to Stephen Conway who had been acting bishop since Lowson retired in December 2021.

On 3 February 2025, it was announced that Court would retire, resigning his See effective 31 July.

=== Views ===
In reaction to the Living in Love and Faith process and the proposed introduction of the blessing of same-sex relationships, he stated: "I am hugely grateful to all those whose honesty and vulnerability have helped shape my own thinking on these issues of human identity and sexuality. I have had much to learn and have been changed."

== Personal life ==
Court is married to Ann, and they have three children.

== Styles ==
- Doctor David Court (1983–1991)
- The Reverend Doctor David Court (1991–2010)
- The Reverend Canon Doctor David Court (2010–2014)
- The Right Reverend Doctor David Court (2014–present)

Church of England titles
Preceded by David Rossdale	Bishop of Grimsby; 2014–2025	Succeeded by Jean Burgess
