= Thomas Crick =

Anglican priest (1885–1970)

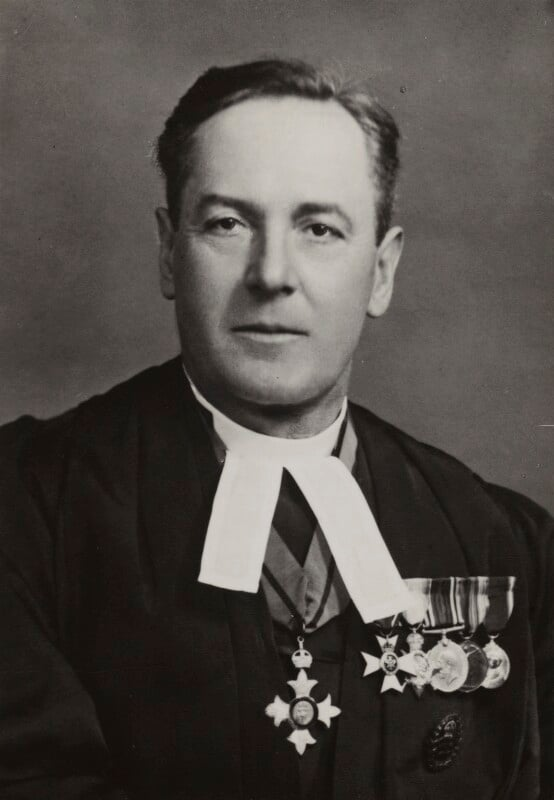
Crick in the 1930s

Thomas Crick, CB, CBE, MVO (17 March 1885 – 13 November 1970) was an Anglican priest in the middle part of the 20th century.

== Life ==
Crick was born in 1885 and educated at St Edmund's School, Canterbury and Brasenose College, Oxford. Ordained in 1909 he began his career with a curacy at Wigan after which he was a Chaplain with the Royal Navy and rose through the service to become Chaplain of the Fleet with the title of Archdeacon of the Royal Navy. An Honorary Chaplain to the King, in 1943 he was appointed Dean of Rochester, a post he held for fifteen years. He died on 13 November 1970. He is now the name of a school house at Kings School Rochester, in Kent. This is called Crick house.

Church of England titles
Preceded by Arthur Deane Gilbertson	Chaplain of the Fleet; 1938–1943	Succeeded by John Kenneth Wilson
Preceded by Ernest Morrell Blackie	Dean of Rochester; 1943–1958	Succeeded by Robert William Stannard
