= David Rossdale =

British bishop (born 1953)

The Right Reverend David Rossdale
- Bishop of Grimsby
- Diocese: Diocese of Lincoln
- In office: 2000–2013
- Predecessor: David Tustin
- Successor: David Court
- Other post: Area bishop of Grimsby (2010–2013)

Orders
- Ordination: 1981
- Consecration: June 2000

Personal details
- Born: 22 May 1953 (age 73)
- Denomination: Anglican
- Residence: Bishop's House, Irby upon Humber
- Spouse: Karen
- Children: 2 sons
- Education: Roehampton University and King's College London

David Douglas James Rossdale (born 22 May 1953) is the former Bishop of Grimsby, a suffragan bishop (and, from 2010 until 31 January 2013, an area bishop) in the Church of England Diocese of Lincoln.

== Biography ==
Rossdale was born on 22 May 1953. He was educated at St John's School, Leatherhead, King's College London and Roehampton University. He has a Master of Arts (MA) and a Master of Science (MSc).

After a period of study at Chichester Theological College, he was ordained in the Church of England as a deacon in 1981 and as a priest in 1982. He began his career with a curacy at St Laurence's Church, Upminster, in the Diocese of Chelmsford from 1981 to 1986. He was then Vicar of St Luke's, Moulsham, Chelmsford, and finally (before his elevation as bishop) Vicar of Cookham and Area Dean of Maidenhead. He retired effective 6 April 2013. Since 2013, he has been an honorary assistant bishop in the Diocese of Lincoln.

=== Views ===
On 11 February 2017, fourteen retired bishops signed an open letter to the then-serving bishops of the Church of England. In an unprecedented move, they expressed their opposition to the House of Bishops' report to General Synod on sexuality, which recommended no change to the Church's canons or practices around sexuality. By 13 February, a serving bishop (Alan Wilson, Bishop of Buckingham) and nine further retired bishops – including Rossdale – had added their signatures; on 15 February, the report was rejected by synod.

== Styles ==
- The Reverend David Rossdale (1981–1994)
- The Reverend Canon David Rossdale (1994–2000)
- The Right Reverend David Rossdale (2000–present)

Church of England titles
Preceded by David Tustin	Bishop of Grimsby; 2000–2013	Succeeded by David Court
