= Rachel Mann =

Anglican priest & poet (born 1970)

The Venerable Rachel Mann
- Archdeacon of Bolton and of Salford
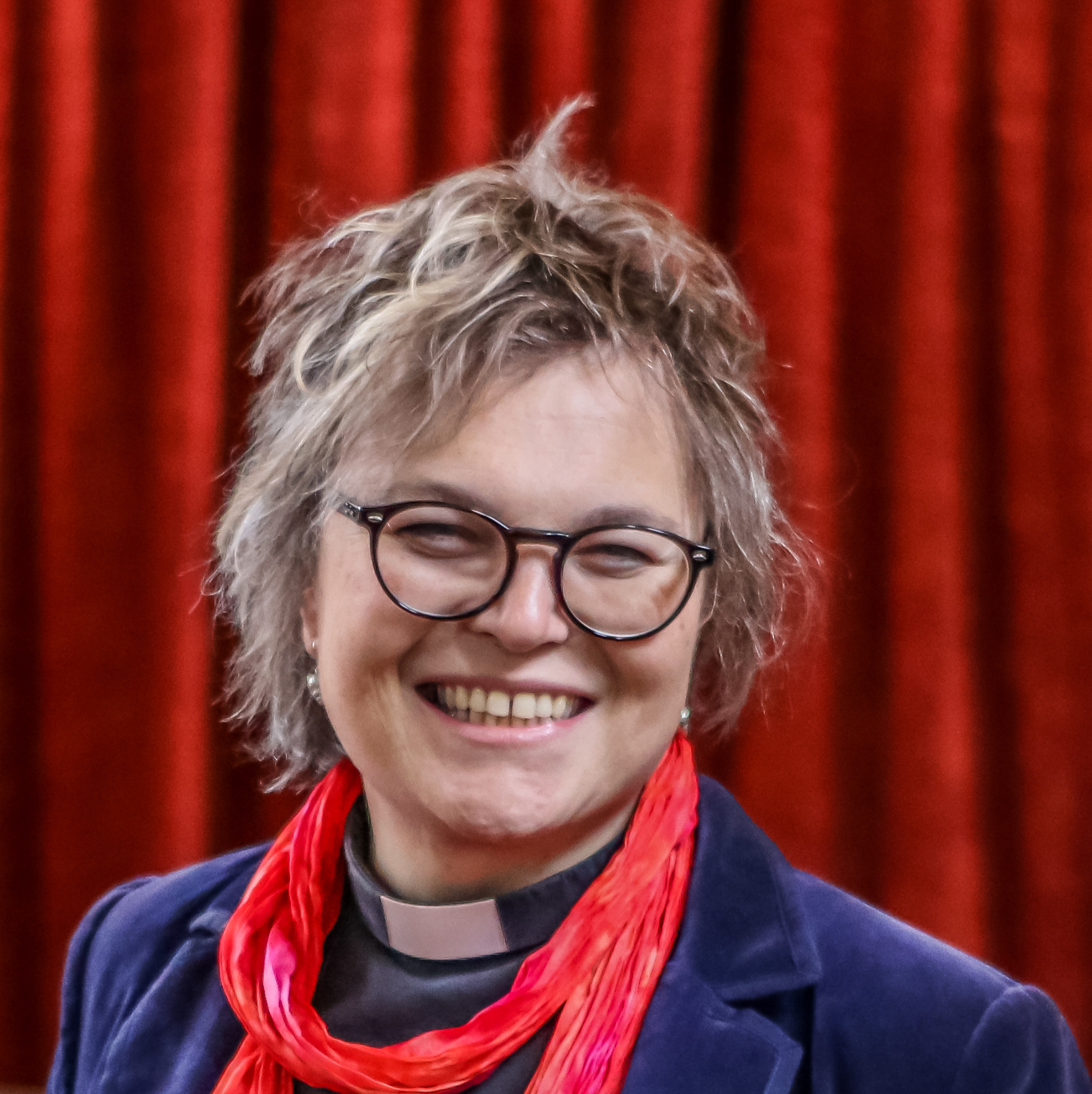
- Diocese: Diocese of Manchester
- In office: 2023–present
- Previous posts: Area Dean of Bury and Rossendale (2021–2023)

Orders
- Ordination: 2005 (deacon); 2006 (priest)

Personal details
- Born: 27 February 1970 (age 56)
- Denomination: Anglicanism
- Profession: Priest; author
- Education: Lancaster University; Queen's College, Birmingham; Manchester Metropolitan University

Rachel Mann (born 1970) is a British Anglican priest, poet and feminist theologian. She is a trans woman who writes, speaks and broadcasts on a wide range of topics including gender, sexuality and religion. She has served as Archdeacon of Bolton and of Salford (in the Diocese of Manchester) since 2023.

== Early life and education ==
Mann was born in 1970. She grew up in Worcestershire, in the village of Hartlebury, and attended Stourport-on-Severn High School. Between 1988 and 1991, she studied philosophy at Lancaster University and completed an M.A. at the same university from 1992 to 1993. She studied for a PhD in philosophy at Lancaster and was a teaching fellow from 1994 to 1996.

From 2003 to 2005, she trained for ordained ministry at Queen's College, Birmingham, an ecumenical theological college. She holds an M.A. in creative writing from Manchester Writing School and she undertook postgraduate studies in the Bible and 19th-century literature at Manchester Metropolitan University. Her doctoral thesis was titled "The representation of fecundity and barrenness in the poetry of Elizabeth Barrett Browning, Christina Rossetti, and the Bible: a critical and creative interrogation of a Christian-feminist poetics", and was completed in 2017.

== Ordained ministry ==
Mann was ordained in the Church of England as a deacon in 2005 and as a priest in 2006. She served her curacy at St Matthew's Church, Stretford in the Diocese of Manchester. Between 2008 and 2017, she was Priest-in-Charge at the Church of St Nicholas, Burnage, before being appointed its Rector in 2018. Between 2009 and 2017, she was also Resident Poet at Manchester Cathedral. In 2017, she was made an honorary canon of Manchester Cathedral. Between February 2018 and the end of its extended quinquennium in July 2021, she was a member of the General Synod of the Church of England, having been elected by the clergy of the Diocese of Manchester.

In June 2021, she left St Nicholas Burnage to become full-time Area Dean of Bury and Rossendale. In the elections for the 2021-2026 Quinquennium, Mann was re-elected as a member of the Church of England's General Synod for Manchester. On 12 June 2023, she was announced as the next Archdeacon of Bolton and of Salford; she was duly collated to those archdeaconries (in plurality) on 4 July.

=== Views ===
Mann belongs to the liberal Anglo-Catholic tradition of the Church of England, though she was brought up an Evangelical-Charismatic Christian. She supports the full inclusion of the LGBT people in the church. Between 2020 and 2024, Mann was a patron of the Open Table Network, an ecumenical Christian charity supporting worship communities for LGBT people and their allies.

On 5 February 2026 it was announced that she will be retiring from her role on 31 July 2026. This is on medical grounds following a long period of ill health and several major surgical operations.

== Author ==
She is the author of Dazzling Darkness: Gender, Sexuality, Illness & God (Glasgow: Wild Goose 2012) and The Risen Dust: Poems and Stories of Passion & Resurrection (Glasgow: Wild Goose 2013), both published by the publishing arm of the Iona Community. Mann is also a contributor to Fear and Friendship: Anglicans Engaging With Islam (Continuum 2012) and several books on liturgical theology, including Presiding Like a Woman (SPCK 2010). Her book about the First World War and Ritual, Fierce Imaginings: The Great War, Ritual, Memory & God (London: D.L.T. 2017) was shortlisted for the 2019 Michael Ramsey Prize for Theological Writing.

In 2018, she was appointed Visiting Teaching Fellow in Creative Writing and English at the Manchester Writing School, Manchester Metropolitan University. She is also a visiting scholar at Sarum College.

In 2019, Carcanet published her debut full poetry collection, A Kingdom of Love. The collection was Highly Commended in the 2020 Forward Prizes for Poetry. In 2020, her debut novel, The Gospel of Eve, was published by D.L.T.

In 2024, Mann's second collection, Eleanor Among the Saints was shortlisted for the T. S. Eliot Prize.

Mann is a regular contributor to Church Times and contributes to BBC Radio 2's Pause for Thought and BBC Radio 4's Thought for the Day, The Daily Service and Prayer for the Day. She also writes about progressive music, metal and folk for Prog, an offshoot of Classic Rock, and The Quietus.

In the 2024 series of Christmas University Challenge on BBC2, Mann represented Manchester Metropolitan University and returned in the 2025 series to represent Lancaster University.

== Awards and honours ==
- The International Michael Ramsey Prize for Theological Writing, 'Shortlisted' (2019)
- Lancaster University ‘Outstanding Alumni Award' (2023)
- The Poetry Book Society 'Spring 2024 PBS Recommendation' (2024)
- T. S. Eliot Prize (shortlisted) for Eleanor Among the Saints (2024)
- The Archbishop of York's Advent Book 2024 for Do Not Be Afraid (2024)
- Award of Merit, The Associated Church Press Awards 2024 for Festival of the Child, The Christian Century

== Selected works ==
- Mann, Rachel (2010). "Presiding from the broken middle". In Slee, Nicola; Burns, Stephen (eds.). Presiding like a Woman: Feminist Gestures for Christian Assemblies. London: SPCK Publishing. pp. 133–139. ISBN 978-0281061860.
- Mann, Rachel (2012). Dazzling Darkness: Gender, Sexuality, Illness & God. Glasgow: Wild Goose Publications. ISBN 978-1849522410.
- Mann, Rachel (2012). "The importance of offence: satire, the Church of England and Islam". In Ward, Frances; Coakley, Sarah (eds.). Fear and friendship: Anglicans engaging with Islam. London: Continuum. pp. 91–104. ISBN 978-1441101495.
- Mann, Rachel (2013). The Risen Dust: Poems and Stories of Passion & Resurrection. Glasgow: Wild Goose Publications. ISBN 978-1849522793.
- Mann, Rachel (2015). A Star-Filled Grace: Worship and Prayer Resources for Advent, Christmas & Epiphany. Glasgow: Wild Goose Publications. ISBN 978-1849524421.
- Mann, Rachel (2017). Fierce Imaginings: The Great War, Ritual, Memory and God. London: Darton, Longman & Todd. ISBN 9780232532784.
- Mann, Rachel (2018). From Now On: A Lent Course on Hope and Redemption in The Greatest Showman. London: Darton, Longman & Todd. ISBN 9780232533927.
- Mann, Rachel (2019). In The Bleak Midwinter: Advent and Christmas with Christina Rossetti. London: Canterbury Press. ISBN 9781786221629.
- Mann, Rachel (2019). A Kingdom Of Love. Manchester: Carcanet. ISBN 9781784108571.
- Mann, Rachel (2020). Christina Rossetti: New Selected Poems. Manchester: Carcanet. ISBN 9781784109066.
- Mann, Rachel (2020). Still Standing: A Lent Course Based on Rocketman. London: Darton, Longman & Todd. ISBN 9780232534917.
- Mann, Rachel (2020). Love's Mysteries: The Body, Grief, Precariousness and God. London: Canterbury Press. ISBN 9781786222817.
- Mann, Rachel (2020). The Gospel of Eve. London: Darton, Longman & Todd. ISBN 9780232534603.
- Mann, Rachel (2021). Spectres of God. London: Darton, Longman & Todd. ISBN 9781913657529.
- Mann, Rachel (2023). A Truth Universally Acknowledged:40 Days with Jane Austen. London: Canterbury Press. ISBN 9781786225030.
- Mann, Rachel (2024). Eleanor Among the Saints. Manchester: Carcanet. ISBN 9781800173811.
- Mann, Rachel (2024). Do Not Be Afraid: The Joy of Waiting in a Time of Fear. London: SPCK. ISBN 9780281090013.
