= Archdeacon of Bolton =

Ecclesiastical officer

The Archdeacon of Bolton (alternatively "Archdeacon of Bolton and Salford") is a senior ecclesiastical officer within the Anglican Diocese of Manchester. The role was created by an Order of the Bishop on 20 May 1982.

As archdeacon, they are responsible for the disciplinary supervision of the clergy within the archdeaconry of Bolton, which consists six area deaneries: Bolton, Bury, Deane, Radcliffe and Prestwich, Rossendale and Walmsley. The post is currently held by Rachel Mann.

== List of archdeacons ==
- 1982–1985: Fred Hoyle (afterwards archdeacon emeritus)
- 1985–1992: Bill Brison (afterwards archdeacon emeritus)
- 1992–2001: Lorys Davies (afterwards archdeacon emeritus)
- 2002–2008: John Applegate (afterwards archdeacon emeritus)
- 2008–2018: David Bailey (archdeacon emeritus since February 2018)
- 25 March 2018 – 25 June 2023 (res.): Jean Burgess (also Archdeacon of Salford from 1 July 2020 and thereafter called "Archdeacon of Bolton and Salford"; became Archdeacon of Bournemouth)
- Since 4 July 2023: Rachel Mann (called "Archdeacon of Bolton and Salford")

== Archdeacon of Salford ==
The Archdeacon of Salford is a similar officer in the same diocese. The first Archdeacon of Salford, from November or December 2009 until 1 July 2020, was David Sharples. He was succeeded by Jean Burgess, who remained also Archdeacon of Bolton. Upon Burgess' resignation as Archdeacon of Bolton and of Salford, her successor was again appointed to both archdeaconries. Rachel Mann was collated on 4 July 2023.
