= Bill Brison =

Anglican priest (1929–2022)

William Stanley Brison (20 November 1929 – 27 October 2022) was an Anglican priest who held senior positions on both sides of the Atlantic.

He was educated at Alfred University and Connecticut University. He trained for ordination at Berkeley Divinity School and was ordained both deacon and priest in 1957. He was Vicar of Christ Church, Bethany, Connecticut from 1957 to 1969; Archdeacon of New Haven, Connecticut from 1967 to 1969; Rector of Stamford, Connecticut from 1969 to 1972; Vicar of Christ Church, Davyhulme from 1972 to 1981; Rector of All Saints', Newton Heath from 1981 to 1985; Area Dean of North Manchester from 1981 to 1985; Archdeacon of Bolton from 1985 to 1992; with the CMS in Nigeria from 1992 to 1994; and the Team Rector of Pendleton from 1994 to 1998. During his time at Newton Heath, he was once robbed at gunpoint.

He married the love of his life Marguerite Adelia Nettleton in June 1951, they were married for 69 years, had four children, nine grandchildren and one great-grandchild. He died on 27 October 2022, aged 92. After being cared for by both his daughter and his granddaughter, he lived to see his first great grandchild.
