= Bishop of Grimsby =

Suffragan bishop in the Church of England

The Bishop of Grimsby is an episcopal title used by a suffragan bishop of the Church of England Diocese of Lincoln, in the Province of Canterbury, England. The title takes its name after the town of Grimsby in Lincolnshire; the See was erected under the Suffragans Nomination Act 1888 by Order in Council dated 15 July 1935.

== List of bishops ==
Bishops of Grimsby
From	Until	Incumbent	Notes
1935	1937	Ernest Blackie	Formerly Bishop of Grantham
1937	1958	Arthur Greaves	Formerly Bishop of Grantham
1958	1966	Kenneth Healey	
1966	1979	Gerald Colin	
1979	2000	David Tustin	
2000	6 April 2013	David Rossdale	Area bishop (2010–2013)
25 July 2014	2025	David Court	Announced 9 May 2014; acting diocesan 1 May – 20 July 2023; retired 31 July 2025.
6 February 2026	present	Jean Burgess	
