= Bishop of Grantham =

Suffragan bishop in the Anglican church

The Bishop of Grantham is an episcopal title used by a suffragan bishop of the Church of England Diocese of Lincoln, in the Province of Canterbury, England. The title takes its name after the market town of Grantham in Lincolnshire. The suffragan bishop has particular oversight of the Archdeaconry of Boston.

Nicholas Chamberlain, the present incumbent, was consecrated Bishop of Grantham on 19 November 2015. In 2016, Chamberlain announced he is gay and in a partnership, becoming the first bishop to do so in the Church of England.

== List of bishops ==
Bishops of Grantham
From	Until	Incumbent	Notes
1905	1920	Welbore MacCarthy	
1920	1930	John Hine	Archdeacon of Lincoln (from 1925); resigned his see and became an assistant bishop, at Swayne's request, to make way for Blackie.
1930	1935	Ernest Blackie	Translated to Grimsby
1935	1937	Arthur Greaves	Translated to Grimsby
1937	1949	Algernon Markham	
1949	1965	Anthony Otter	
1965	1972	Ross Hook	Translated to Bradford
1972	1987	Dennis Hawker	
1987	1997	Bill Ind	Translated to Truro
1997	2006	Alastair Redfern	Translated to Derby
2006	26 September 2013	Tim Ellis	Area bishop, 2010–2013
2013	2015	vacancy	Upon Ellis' resignation, it was announced that the see was not to be filled.
2015	present	Nicholas Chamberlain	since his consecration on 19 November 2015.
