= Wish (disambiguation) =

A wish is a hope or a desire.

Wish, WISH or The Wish may also refer to:

== Arts and media ==
=== Movies and broadcasting ===
- Wish or Hope (2013 film), a 2013 South Korean film directed by Lee Joon-ik
- Wish (film), a 2023 film from Walt Disney Animation Studios
- "The Wish" (Buffy the Vampire Slayer), a 1998 Buffy the Vampire Slayer episode
- "The Wish" (The Amazing World of Gumball), a 2019 The Amazing World of Gumball episode
- Wish Ko Lang!, Philippine drama TV series
- Eleanor Wish, a fictional character in the TV series Bosch
- Wish FM, a radio station in Merseyside, UK
- WISH-FM, a radio station (98.9 FM) licensed to Galatia, Illinois, US
- WISH-TV, a television station licensed to Indianapolis, Indiana, US
- DWNU, a radio station in Metro Manila, Philippines, branded as Wish 107.5

=== Music ===
==== Bands ====
- W.i.S.H., an Indian girl group

==== Albums ====
- Wish (The Cure album), 1992
- Wish (Feargal Sharkey album), 1988
- Wish (Joshua Redman album) or the title song (see below), 1993
- Wish (Reamonn album) or the title song, 2006
- Wish (Sutton Foster album), 2009
- Wish (Yuna Ito album) or the title song, 2008
- Wish, a 2009 album by Janice Vidal

==== Songs ====
- "Wish" (Arashi song), 2005
- "Wish" (Diplo song), 2018
- Wish (NCT Wish song), 2024
- "Wish" (Nine Inch Nails song), 1992
- "Wish"/"Starless Night", by Olivia, 2006
- "Wish", by Alien Ant Farm from ANThology, 2001
- "Wish", by Basement from Colourmeinkindness, 2012
- "Wish", by BTS from BTS World: Original Soundtrack, 2019
- "Wish", by Denzel Curry from Zuu, 2019
- "Wish", by Donna Cruz and Jason Everly, 1996
- "Wish", by Flying Saucer Attack from Flying Saucer Attack, 1993
- "Wish", by Gabi DeMartino featuring Mina Tobias from Paintings of Me, 2022
- "Wish", by Isobel Cooper from the game Rygar: The Legendary Adventure, 2002
- "Wish", by Joshua Redman from Joshua Redman, 1993
- "Wish", by Ravyn Lenae from Hypnos, 2022
- "Wish", by S.E.S. from A Letter from Greenland, 2000
- "Wish", by Soul II Soul from Volume IV The Classic Singles 88–93, 1993
- "The Wish", by Bruce Springsteen from Tracks, 1998

=== Visual art and literature ===
- Charles Wish (born 1971), American painter
- The Wish (painting), an 1840 painting by Theodor von Holst
- Wish (manga), a 1996 shojo manga series created by Clamp
- The Wish (novel), by Gail Carson Levine

== Organizations and companies ==
- Wish (charity), a UK-based mental health charity working with women
- Wish (company), an e-commerce website
- Women's Institute of Science & Humanities, Pakistan

== Other uses ==
- wish (Unix shell), a windowing shell for Tcl
- Wireless intelligent stream handling, a way to prioritize wireless network traffic
- Disney Wish, Disney cruise ship named Wish
- Toyota Wish, a minivan

== See also ==
- Wishes (disambiguation)
- Vish (disambiguation)
- Wished (film), a 2017 film
- Whish, a surname
