= List of people from the London Borough of Tower Hamlets =

This is a list of notable people associated with the London Borough of Tower Hamlets in London, England.

- Kia Abdullah – author; born in Mile End, went to school in Bow
- Damon Albarn – singer-songwriter for bands Blur, Gorillaz; born in Whitechapel
- Joe Anderson – 'All England' boxing champion of 1897
- Cheryl Baker – member of Bucks Fizz, winners of the 1981 Eurovision Song Contest, grew up in Roman Road, Bethnal Green
- Danny Boyle – film director, producer and screenwriter; lives in Mile End
- Rosa Nouchette Carey – children's novelist; born in Stratford-le-Bow
- Ashley Cole – footballer, played for Arsenal's invincibles; born in Stepney; attended Bow Boys School
- Steve Conway – singer (1920–1952), born in Bethnal Green
- Donald Crisp – Academy Award-winning actor; born in Bow
- Ralph Fiennes – actor; lives in Bethnal Green
- Clara Grant – educational pioneer and social reformer
- John Granville Harkness – major-general in the British Army of the Victorian era
- Peter Green – guitarist and songwriter, founder of Fleetwood Mac; born in Mile End
- Perry Groves – footballer, played for Arsenal; born in Bow
- Felicity Jones – actress, lives in Bethnal Green
- Isaac Julien – artist, raised in Bow
- Ledley King – former footballer; defender for Tottenham Hotspur; born in Bow
- Oona King – former Labour MP for Bethnal Green and Bow; political commentator
- Andy Lee – professional boxer; born in Bow
- Eddie Marsan – actor; grew up in Bethnal Green
- Charlotte McDonnell – comedian and musician; YouTube personality; shared a flat in Bow
- Ian McKellen – actor; lives in Limehouse
- Margaret Moran – former Labour MP for Luton South
- Graham Norton – comedian and television presenter; lives in Wapping
- Sylvia Pankhurst – suffragette and social campaigner
- Lutfur Rahman – former mayor of Tower Hamlets (2010-2015; lives in Whitechapel
- Dizzee Rascal – grime musician
- Harry Redknapp – former footballer; manager, Queens Park Rangers
- John Robertson – premier of New South Wales, Australia, on five occasions between 1881 and 1886; born in Bow
- Tinchy Stryder – grime musician
- Joakim Sundström – Swedish sound editor, sound designer and musician; has a flat south of Bow
- Danny Wallace – filmmaker, comedian, writer, actor, and presenter of radio and television; lives in Bow
- Wiley – grime musician, urban artist
- Glen Wilkie (born 1977), League 1 football player
- Amy Winehouse – jazz singer-songwriter; had a flat in Bow
- Bonnie Wright – actress

== See also ==
- List of mayors of Tower Hamlets
- List of people from London
