= Vishu (disambiguation) =

Vishu may refer to:

- Vishu, Indian festival
- Vishu, a 2022 Indian Marathi-language film by Mayur Madhukar Shinde
- Vishu Bhatnagar, Indian singer

== See also ==
- Vishnu (disambiguation)
- Vish (disambiguation)
