= Wishes (disambiguation) =

Wishes are hopes or desires.

Wishes may also refer to:

== Albums ==
- Wishes (Lari White album), 1994, or the title song
- Wishes, a Buckethead album and song
- Wishes (Jon Butcher album), or the title song
- Wishes (Rhodes album), 2015, or the title song
- Wishes (Voisper album), 2018
- Wishes (Margo Smith & Holly album), 1992
- Wishes: A Holiday Album, a 2002 jazz album by Kenny G, or the title song

== Songs ==
- "Wishes" (Human Nature song), 1996
- "Wishes" (Oh Land song), 2019
- "Wishes", a song by Beach House from the 2012 album Bloom
- "Wishes", a song by The Melons

== Other uses ==
- Wishes: A Magical Gathering of Disney Dreams, a fireworks spectacular at the Magic Kingdom theme park in Florida and at Disneyland Park in Paris
- Wishes (TV series), a Singaporean kids drama

== See also ==
- Wish (disambiguation)
