= St Margaret's House =

Community centre in Bethnal Green, London

Coordinates: 51.5298°N 0.0544°W

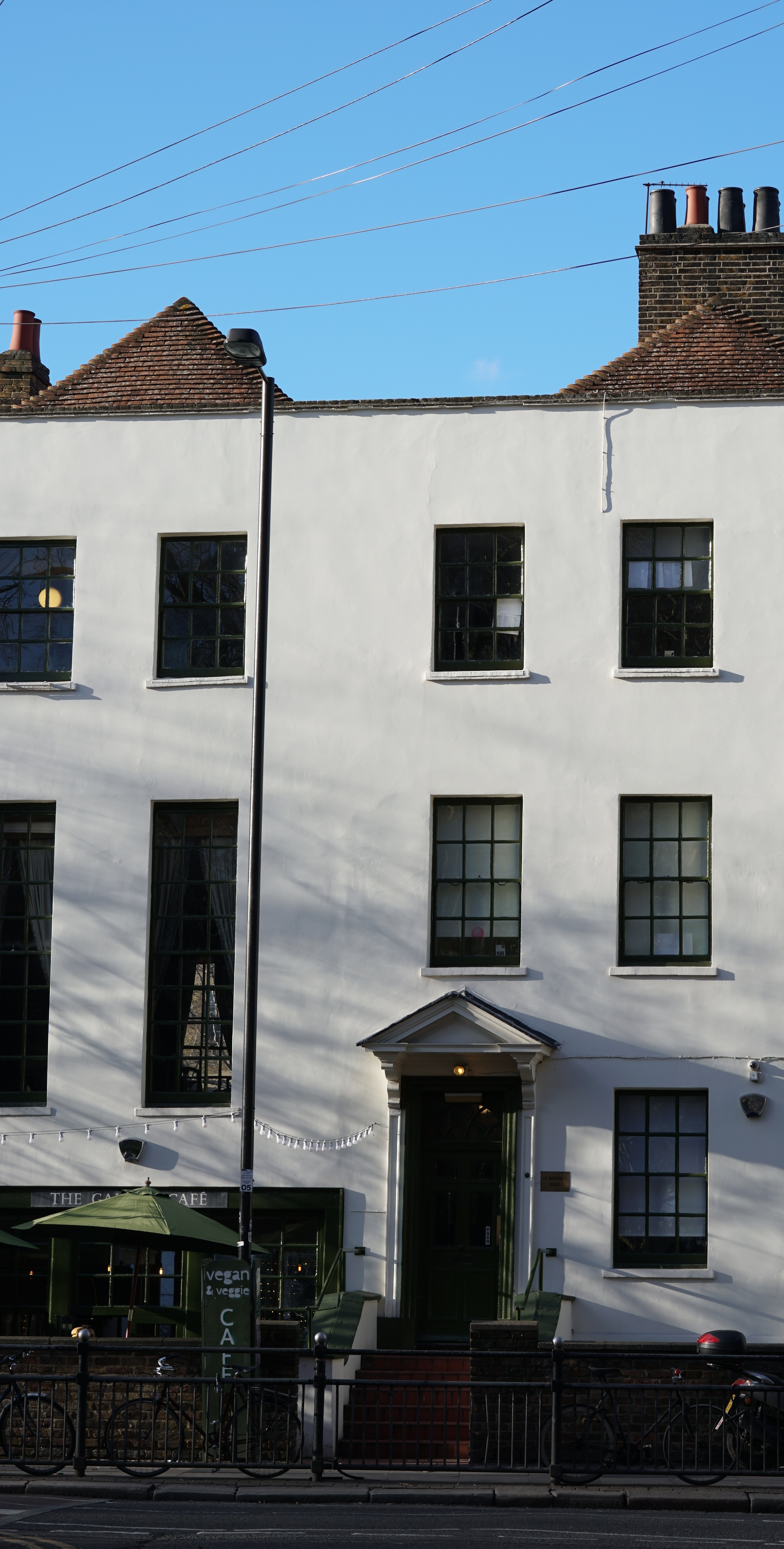
St Margaret's House

St Margaret's House is a community centre in Bethnal Green in the London Borough of Tower Hamlets. It was established in October 1889 as the Bethnal Green Ladies' Committee, with Princess Mary Adelaide, Duchess of Teck, as president. It has since become a charity supporting creativity and wellbeing in Tower Hamlets, running a variety of community projects providing spaces for residents to eat, shop, learn, create and enjoy cultural programmes.

== History ==
=== Beginnings ===
St Margaret's House began in early 1888 when Miss Elizabeth Anson distributed a leaflet in Oxford asking for support for a Ladies' Mission. What later became St Margaret's House was initially called the Bethnal Green Ladies' Committee.

Oxford House, another settlement in Bethnal Green, had formed in 1884, and in 1886 founded the Federation of Working Men's Clubs. Thus, St Margaret's House acted as the female equivalent of Oxford House.

The name for the house came in the early 1890s when the Oxford ladies took a lease for the "eminently suitable" premises at 4 Victoria Park Square, which had space for 8 or 9 residents and three living rooms, with suitable offices. On 21 March 1893, after a short service read by the Bishop of Bedford, St Margaret's House was opened by Princess Mary Adelaide.

=== Development of community work ===
The house's early pioneering work included the Children's Country Holiday Fund, the Metropolitan Association for Befriending Young Servants, district and hospital visits, a needlework scheme to employ very poor women through the winter months, and running the club for girls.

A small chapel was built by residents and on St Margaret's Day in June 1904, Bishop Winnington Ingram came to dedicate the chapel.

=== Call for residents ===
In December 1900, the Georgian town house of 21 Old Ford Road, which belonged to the Female Guardians Association, was bought by the organisation and became the centre for the settlement. On 5 May 1903, Princess Beatrice of the United Kingdom officially opened the new house.

The women living in St Margaret's House wrote to the Editor of The Spectator in February 1903 to call out for other women to become residents: "Our object is to secure two or three permanent residents to fill the place of some who have had to leave us unexpectedly." S. Talbot, a resident, wrote. To become a resident at this point, it cost 20s to 25s per week, and each woman had to undergo a three-month trial before becoming an official resident.

=== The First World War ===
The First World War resulted in fewer people signing up to be residents of St Margaret's House, and membership of the clubs dropped off because the blackout prevented girls from being able to attend.

The Hon. Mrs Whittuck, a committee member of the House, had died before the war in 1915; two years later, her executors called in the balance of her debt, which included the loan she had taken out to buy St Margaret's House. With funds limited in an already difficult time, it looked as if St Margaret's House would have to close. However, an anonymous benefactor cleared off most of St Margaret's House's debt, allowing it to remain open.

=== In between wars ===
The social upheavals following the War meant that residents were no longer ladies of independent means but working people, including teachers and librarians, helping with House activities as part of their rent.

By the early 1920s, St Margaret's House had fourteen residents, including the Head and the Bursar, six lodgers engaged in teaching or social work, two medical students and one Charity Organisation Society worker. At this point, the settlement still only housed women.

In 1924, St Margaret's House started a children's play hours scheme twice a week for over 50 children in Bethnal Green. This same year, the house also helped launch the local branch of the Industrial Christian Fellowship.

In 1929 the house secured the services of Eleanor Kelly, who was a founding member of the Association of Welfare Workers. She said of her work, "All firms who had been doing welfare work before the outbreak of war were asked to take relays of people (mostly women) to train."

=== Continued financial difficulties ===
St Margaret's House again faced financial difficulties in this period and, in 1921, it was charging £2 a term for the training of students to help improve their financial situation.

With the Great Depression, the 1930s saw a terrible period of unemployment in the East End. This meant that from 1933, St Margaret's House assisted in the running of both the Peel Grove Hobbies Centre for the unemployed and the Unemployed Men's Centre. It also started to send out food parcels to old-aged pensioners and the very poor.

=== The Second World War and post-war ===
With the outbreak of war, the Bethnal Green branch of the Citizens Advice Bureaux was organised in the House, and the House became an evacuation sub-office during the Blitz.

Half of the houses in Bethnal Green were destroyed by bombing during the Second World War, but St Margaret's House escaped serious damage. There were, however, several near misses, including an incendiary bomb which fell on the chapel roof and failed to ignite. Following the war the main house had to undergo extensive repair, including a new roof and rewiring.

In 1953, the council decided that men could live at St Margaret's House as well as women, as the number of female students wishing to take up residence at the house had declined.

Throughout the 1960s and '70s, St Margaret's House continued to face financial ups and downs, but a visit by the poet laureate, Sir John Betjeman, in 1975, helped to raise enough money to get the house through this financial crisis.

Throughout the 1980s, St Margaret's House began new, community-centred initiatives with organisations including Bethnal Green Citizens Advice Bureau, the Tower Hamlets Vietnamese Families Association, and the Activity in Retirement Workcentre.

=== Expansion ===
In June 1993, the settlement became the leaseholder of two adjoining buildings, numbers 15 and 17 Old Ford Road. With more space, the House expanded its work and, from the extra revenue generated, the House established its Community Arts Project. By 2001, with funding from both public and private sources, St Margaret's House was able to buy both these houses.

In 2006, the House opened the Gallery Café and it now manages four separate community projects out of its buildings: the Gallery Café, Ayoka Charity Shop, Yoganest and The Create Place.

St Margaret's House now includes the buildings at 15, 17, 21, 23, 27, and 29 Old Ford Road. As of March 2017, the charity has 14 trustees. 28 employees and 18 volunteers

In 2014, as part of a government scheme to help the community, St Margaret's House was chosen to train four volunteers, and they still work closely with volunteers today, who are involved across their projects.

== Current work ==
=== The Gallery Café ===
From 1900 until the late 1980s, the café was used by St Margaret's House as a place for the residents to provide social welfare services for local people. Since then, it has played host to several organisations, including a Vietnamese luncheon club, and the Rathbone society, which ran a training project for people with learning difficulties.

The space opened as a vegetarian not-for-profit, community café in 2006, and became a fully vegan café in December 2017. The café offers low-cost vegan dishes, desserts, locally ground coffee, and juices. It runs a different art exhibition each month, and hosts events including live music, spoken-word nights and comedy performances.

The café has won Best Café in Bethnal Green at the Time Out Love London Awards in 2014, 2015, and 2016, and all the profits generated by the café go straight back into St Margaret's House.

The Gallery Café has also been visited by several celebrities, including Robert Pattinson, Jarvis Cocker, Björk and Boy George.

=== The Create Place ===
The Create Place is St Margaret's House's non-profit arts studio, which works to build relationships in the community through creativity.

It is home to around twelve weekly workshops, from painting to clothes repair to shoemaking. These creative sessions are facilitated by people in the local East London community, with a lot of the workshops being run by volunteers.

=== Yoganest ===
The Yoganest is St Margaret's House's most recent project; it provides low-cost wellbeing classes for the community of Bethnal Green. The aim of the studio is to both promote wellbeing and engage members to come together and play a more active social role in the community.

The classes it offers include vinyasa flow, mum and baby yoga, and Tai Chi.

=== Ayoka ===
Ayoka is St Margaret's House's charity boutique, selling secondhand and vintage clothes, homewares, antiques, DVDs, CDs and books. The shop was runner-up in the Time Out 2018 Love London awards for best shop in Bethnal Green.

Ayoka is run completely on donations from the Bethnal Green community, and it is mostly staffed by volunteers.

== Other community projects ==
=== Women's Month ===
St Margaret's House ran a series of events for Women's Month in March 2018 to celebrate the impact women have on their local community. This included a screening of the films Vessel and Girl Rising, and a panel discussion with the social enterprises Juta Shoes, Wish Charity and Bread and Roses.

Throughout the month, an exhibition was held at the Gallery Café made up of submissions from local photographers who had taken photographs of an East London woman who inspired them. The women featured in the photographs included Gabby Edlin from Bloody Good Period and Chantal Joffe, an artist known for her expressive portraits of women and children.

=== Winter Markets ===
St Margaret's House fundraised for the women's mental health charity Wish at its 2017 Winter Market, which was East London's only ethical winter market.

=== Charities and groups ===
St Margaret's House is home to more than 27 charities and organisations, including Quaker Social Action, the British Stammering Association and the University of the Third Age.

It also offers room hire to businesses, community groups, or charities. Renting the buildings and spaces of the charity makes up a large proportion of the charity's income, enabling it to keep running community projects.

== Associated people and organisations ==
- Princess Mary Adelaide (1883–1897) – opened the house in 1983
- Mary of Teck (1867–1953) – visited St Margaret's House in 1903 to see the girls’ club
- Princess Beatrice of the United Kingdom (1857–1944) – performed the official opening of the new buildings for both St Margaret's House and the Club rooms on 5 May 1903
- Sir John Betjeman (1906–1984) – visited St Margaret's House in 1975
