= Satan's Whiskers =

Cocktail bar in Bethnal Green, London

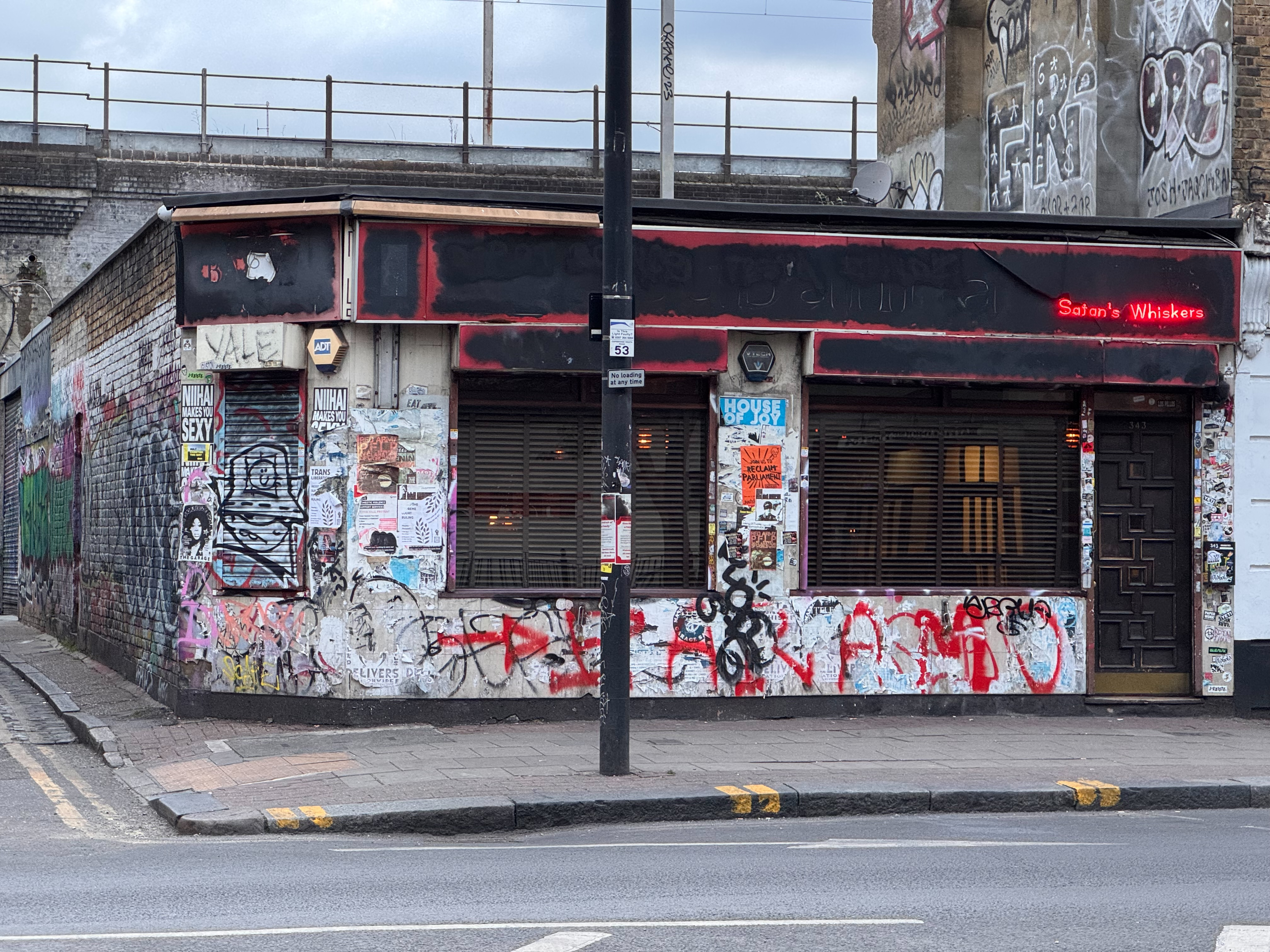
- Satan's Whiskers in 2025
- Interactive map of Satan's Whiskers

Restaurant information
- Established: November 2013; 12 years ago
- Owner: Kevin Armstrong
- Previous owners: Damian Benjamin; Fraser Chapman
- Location: 343 Cambridge Heath Road, London E2 9RA, England
- Coordinates: 51°31′47″N 0°03′22″W
- Seating capacity: 50
- Website: www.satanswhiskers.com

Satan's Whiskers is a cocktail bar in the Bethnal Green neighbourhood of East London. Founded in 2013 by bartenders and entrepreneurs Kevin Armstrong, Damian Benjamin, and Fraser Chapman, the bar specialises in classic cocktails using traditional bartending methods, with a menu that changes every day.

The bar's atmosphere is characterised by taxidermy décor on exposed brick walls, with a soundtrack mostly comprising old-school hip-hop. The bar's name comes from the gin-, vermouth-, and orange juice-based cocktail of the same name, first published in Harry Craddock's The Savoy Cocktail Book in 1930.

Often described as "London's bartender's bar", Satan's Whiskers has been ranked the best bar in the United Kingdom by Morning Advertiser's Top 50 Cocktail Bars three times, most recently in 2025, and it was named the world's 29th best bar in 2024 by The World's 50 Best Bars.

== History ==
Before co-founding Satan's Whiskers, Kevin Armstrong worked as a bartender at London bars Trailer Happiness and Milk & Honey London, the latter of which topped The World's 50 Best Bars twice. He launched Satan's Whiskers in November 2013 along with co-founders Fraser Chapman and Damian Benjamin, also seasoned London bartenders.

On the inspiration behind the bar, Armstrong said: "Opening Satan's Whiskers was in some ways a response to the types of bars that were being opened around that time. Many bars were more concept-driven or had started leaning more heavily into the techniques found in cuisine and fine dining. We wanted to do the opposite: to prove that great bars didn't need to be high concept, and the classic cocktails could still be relevant, especially if done well and in a good setting."

Armstrong cites the bar's daily-changing menu for its high bartender retention rates and sustained success over its first decade of business, remarking, "Making the same 10 or 20 drinks every day gets a little boring, but when the menu can change each day, our bartenders are always learning and perfecting recipes."

On 10 February 2025, Satan's Whiskers joined fellow London cocktail bar The Connaught Bar for a one-day pop-up at Sip & Guzzle, a cocktail bar in the Greenwich Village neighbourhood of Manhattan, New York City.

== Menu ==
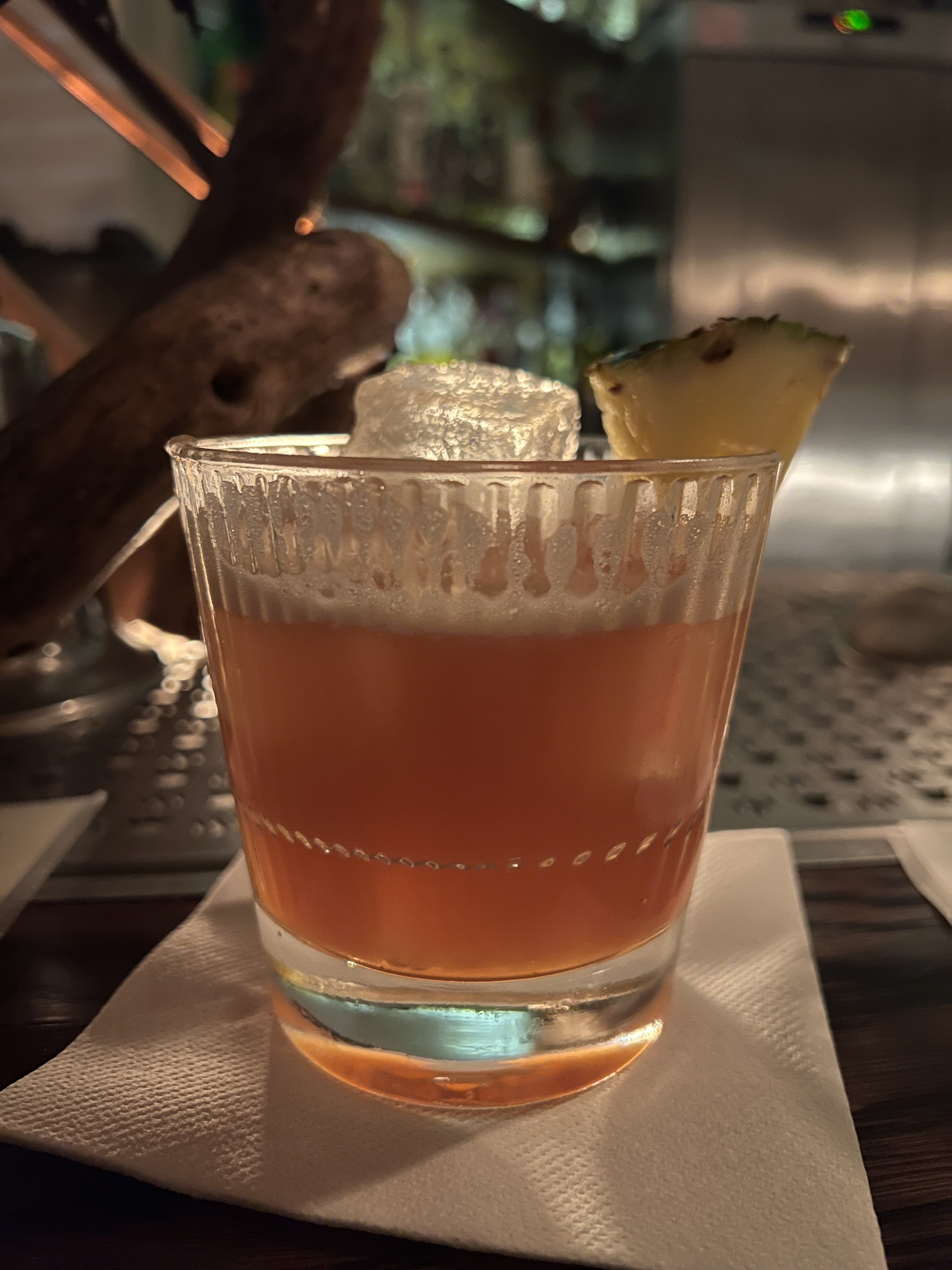
The Jungle Bird, a modern classic cocktail, served at Satan's Whiskers

Satan's Whiskers features a cocktail menu that changes on a daily basis, drawing from a catalogue of about 900 different drinks, with a focus on classic and modern classic cocktails. Customers are also encouraged to order off-menu cocktails due to the extensive drink catalogue. The bar also offers a food menu, as well as a variety of pre-batched bottled cocktails for takeaway orders.

== Reception ==
On The World's 50 Best Bars, Satan's Whiskers was ranked 29th in the world in 2024, dropping by one place from 28th in 2023. On their annual Top 50 Cocktail Bars list, Morning Advertiser named Satan's Whiskers the best bar in the United Kingdom in 2019, 2023, and 2025.

In June 2025, Bon Appétit listed Satan's Whiskers among London's seven best cocktail bars, calling it "truly your favorite bartender's favorite bar," adding, "While other bars are lacto-fermenting, clarifying, and rotovapping their cocktails together, Satan's Whiskers sticks to the vast cocktail canon, executing each drink with surgical accuracy." In May 2025, Condé Nast Traveller similarly named Satan's Whiskers one of the best cocktail bars in London, calling the bar "a very London version of a New York dive bar" and noting, "Ask a local bartender for their favourite cocktail spot and you'll hear the name Satan's Whiskers more often than not."

In 2019, British GQ also listed Satan's Whiskers among the best cocktail bars in London, writing: "Got a hankering for a Mai Tai? Go on then. Love a White Russian? You'll be hard-pressed to find somewhere that does one better. In fact, the same could be said about any of the hundreds of drinks memorised by the exceptionally talented bartenders, all of whom boast an encyclopaedic knowledge of recipes (a byproduct of the bar's daily changing list)."

Time Out London gave Satan's Whiskers a 5-star review in 2015, writing: "The less intrepid Londoner may be put off by the street view of Satan's Whiskers: it looks every bit a down-and-out dive bar. Inside though, it breaks the east London bar mould, with hip hop on the stereo, a smartly modish setting, vintage French posters on the wall and some of the best cocktails to be found in Bethnal Green's burgeoning booze scene."
