= Bethnal Green mulberry tree =

Ancient black mulberry tree

Coordinates: 51°31′57.78″N 0°2′58.4″W

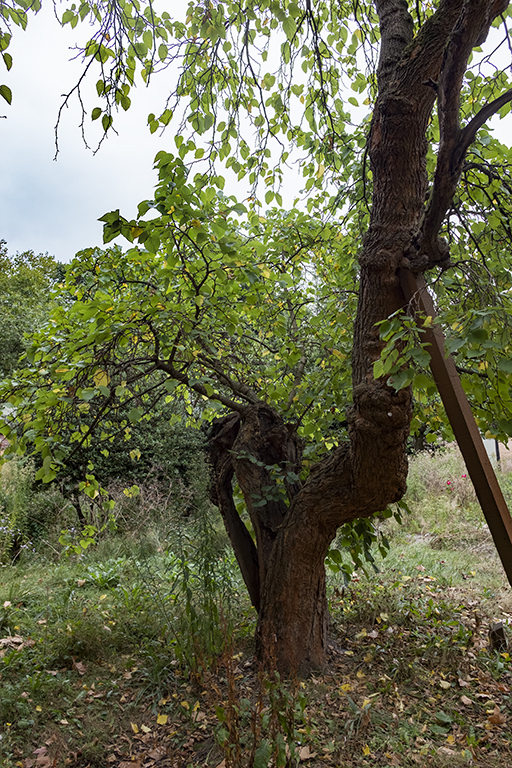
The Bethnal Green mulberry tree in 2016

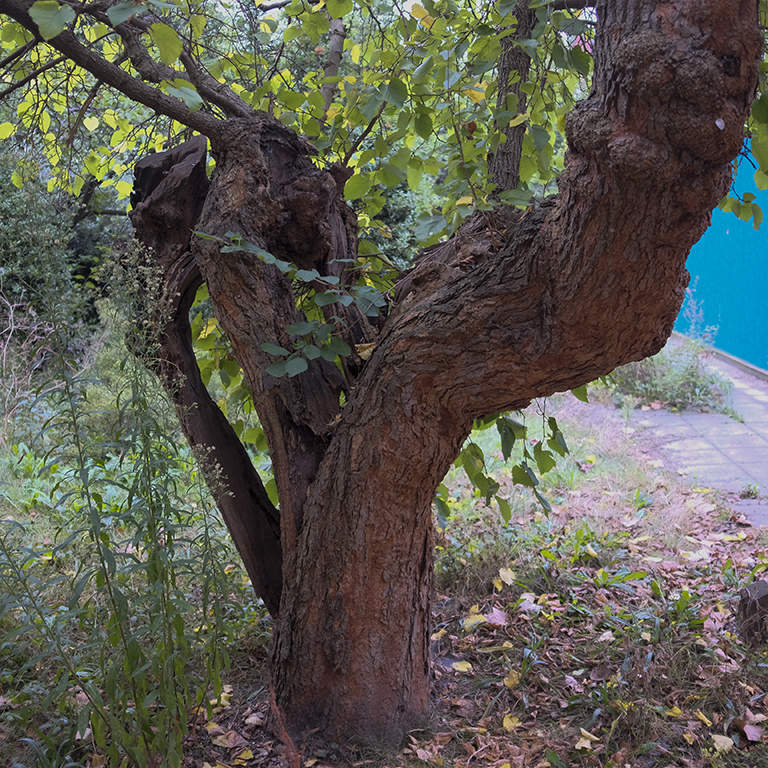
Detail of the tree

The Bethnal Green mulberry tree is an ancient black mulberry tree, in the grounds of the former London Chest Hospital, at Bethnal Green in the London Borough of Tower Hamlets.

Many British mulberry trees have associations with famous people, and while evidence sometimes survives to confirm these associations, this is not always the case. The Bethnal Green mulberry is the subject of an unconfirmed tradition linking it to the infamous Bishop Bonner – known as Bloody Bonner.

The exact age of the tree is unknown but is thought to be at least 200 years old and may be over 400 years old making it the oldest tree in the East End. If the Bishop Bonner tradition is correct, it may be around 500 years old and the oldest black mulberry in the United Kingdom.

From 2017 to 2021, the tree was the subject of a successful community campaign to resist a developer application to move the tree, an action the campaigners argued risked the death of the tree.

== The site ==
The East London site of the former London Chest Hospital, just east of Bonner Road has a long history. Roman bricks and tiles were found on the site in the mid-19th century, suggesting a high status Romano-British site.

The spot was later used as the manor house of the Manor (estate) of Stepney, which covered much of what would later become the East End. The Lords of the Manor had been the Bishops of London who held the Manor long before Domesday, with Stepney possibly part of the foundation grant of land when the Diocese of London was re-established (as the East Saxon see) in 604. The first surviving record of the Bishop's having a residence on their Stepney estate (which included Bethnal Green at that time) is from 1207.

At one time the Manor House was known as Bishop's Wood, later as Bishop's Hall. Bishop's Hall was demolished in the mid 19th century and replaced by the London Chest Hospital which was opened in 1855, by a group of mostly Quaker philanthropists. The hospital's chapel was erected adjacent to the tree.

== The tree ==
The line of Bishops who held Stepney included saints, such as Cedd and Dunstan, but in the mid-sixteenth century, Bishop Edmund Bonner – or Bloody Bonner became notorious for his persecution of Protestants, during a period of mutual intolerance. There is a tradition that Bonner sat beneath a mulberry tree while deciding which heretics to burn. In Foxe's Book of Martyrs, published in 1563, the Bishop is depicted flogging a martyr next to a sapling.

In the archive of the Royal London Hospital in Whitechapel there is an inkwell made in 1911 from a preserved slice of a tree, which is recorded as having been taken from a broken bough of a mulberry 'reputed to be that under which Bishop Bonner went to sit in the cool of the evening'. If Bonner's tree is not the current Bethnal Green mulberry tree, it could be a scion of that tree. Mulberry trees do not lose boughs until they have reached an age of around 120 years, and a young tree is unlikely to attract a tradition, even a false one, linking it to a figure from the distant past. An arbocultural assessment therefore concluded that the latest reasonable origin of the tree was from around 1800. Estimating the maximum age of veteran trees is very challenging, especially in this case, with the damage the tree had sustained over the years; but 350–400 years was seen as most likely (making it the oldest tree in the East End), with even older estimates, such as those linking the tree to Bonner, also plausible.

A photograph in the Royal London Hospital Archives shows nurses dancing round the Bethnal Green Mulberry in the hospital grounds in 1944. In 1945, in the last few months of the Second World War, a bomb fell on the adjacent chapel, the chapel was destroyed and the tree, though damaged, survived. Charring can still be seen on the tree today.

== Black mulberry ==
The black mulberry is not native to the British Isles and rarely grows from seed; it usually needs to be carefully propagated from cuttings. Once established though, black mulberry trees can be long lived, with the oldest known example, a healthy specimen at Syon House, recorded as being planted in 1548. In English folklore, mulberry is associated with patience, since the tree will not come into leaf until the risk of frost has passed. This usually happens in early to mid-May depending on conditions. The risk of frost is traditionally said to pass at St Dunstan’s Day (19th May).

Today mulberries are best known for their use as food, notably in jam, but the Romans – who introduced the tree to Britain – valued it as a medicinal plant, useful for its effects on the gastro-intestinal system. This usage was maintained by monasteries who were the main source of medical care in medieval England.

The black mulberry became associated, particularly in the East End, with the silk weaving industry, which was originally brought to England by Protestant Huguenot refugees from France in the time of Henry VIII in the early 16th century. This migration gathered pace in the 17th century, with extensive settlement in the East End – especially Bethnal Green, Bishopsgate Without and Spitalfields – making the area a major centre silk weaving centre. Silk weaving was carried out producing imported raw materials, but in the early sixteenth century, James VI and I, keen to promote the industry encouraged the widespread planting on mulberries in an attempt to end that dependence by providing a foodstuff for the silkworm. The attempt to produce British raw materials for the industry was largely unsuccessful. Despite this mulberries were still planted for ornamental purposes, being highly prized for their shade giving properties.

The importance of the textiles industry to the East End led to the inclusion of a sprig of mulberry in the coat of arms of the London borough of Tower Hamlets (together with a weavers shuttle). The mulberry is also included in tribute to the Huguenot refugees. Mulberry leaves and berries were also included in Tower Hamlets street signs for a time, with many of these surviving. In 2016, the then Bishop of London, planted a black mulberry at Christ Church, Spitalfields, describing the species as emblematic of the prosperity brought by migrants.

== Proposed site redevelopment ==
In April 2015 the London Chest Hospital closed and the site was purchased by a housing developer. In early 2017 the developer obtained permission from Tower Hamlets Council's Arboricultural team to relocate the mulberry tree, prior to submitting a planning application to redevelop the hospital and surrounding grounds. These plans were opposed by campaigners from the East End Waterway Group.

The Bethnal Green mulberry is subject to a tree preservation order, issued by Tower Hamlets Council. In 2017 a Judicial Review was brought, arguing that the age of the tree had been underestimated – that it was in fact a veteran tree, and would be covered by the National Planning Policy Framework (NPPF), which states that "development resulting in the loss or deterioration of irreplaceable habitats (such as ancient woodland and ancient or veteran trees) should be refused, unless there are wholly exceptional reasons and a suitable compensation strategy exists". It was argued that the risks associated with moving a veteran tree meant that permission to relocate it ought not to have been granted. Tower Hamlets Council agreed and the plans were temporarily suspended.

In a lecture on the mulberry tree given in March 2018, Julian Forbes Laird (of Forbes Laird Arboricultural Consultancy) described the relocation plan as "unlikely to succeed. The tree will either fall apart or die, or possibly both".

A petition titled 'Save the Bethnal Green Mulberry' was launched in 2017 by the East End Preservation Society. It had reached 10,000 signatures by September 2018. In addition, Tower Hamlets council received three hundred letters of objection. At the time of the 2011 census there were 13,683 residents in Bethnal Green.

The planning application, including relocation of the mulberry tree, went to Tower Hamlets planning committee in September 2018. Three councillors voted to reject the plans and four voted to approve (with one abstention), and the tree was agreed be relocated to the lawn in front of the old hospital entrance.

On 21 May 2021, the High Court quashed the grant of planning permission and listed building consent for the redevelopment. High Court judge Sir Duncan Ouseley said the council's planning committee had "misinterpreted" planning policy when it considered whether the tree would die if it was moved and the "material consideration was ignored".

== See also ==
- List of individual trees
