= Glen Wilkie =

English footballer

Personal information
- Date of birth: 22 January 1977 (age 49)
- Place of birth: Bethnal Green, England
- Position: Defender

Youth career
- Leyton Orient

Senior career*
Years	Team	Apps	(Gls)
1995–1996	Leyton Orient	19	(0)
- * Club domestic league appearances and goals

Glen Wilkie (born 22 January 1977) is an English former footballer. He played for Football League 1 club Leyton Orient in the 1995–1996 season.

== Career ==
Born in Bethnal Green, London, Wilkie progressed through Leyton Orient academy and made his debut for the club in 1995 at the age of 17 against Crewe away marking a young Danny Murphy. In total he appeared in nineteen matches for the Os, including four as substitute. He later went on to play in Finland for IFK Mariehamn & Hammarland IF over 4 seasons, scoring 18 goals.

== Personal life ==
In 2012, he appeared on the 25th series of Come Dine with Me, winning the Reading leg of the series.
