= Parmiter's Almshouse & Pension Charity =

- Named after: Thomas Parmiter
- Type: Charity
- Registration no.: 215087
- Headquarters: 6 Trull Farm Buildings. Tetbury, Gloucestershire
- Leader: Claire Downey

Parmiter's Almshouse & Pension Charity is a charity that has its origins in the will of Thomas Parmiter, a silk merchant from Bethnal Green.

== History ==
In his will of 28 February 1681/2, Thomas Parmiter bequeathed funds for "six almshouses in some convenient place upon the waste of Bethnal Green and further for the building of one free school houses or room, wherein ten poor children of the hamlet of Bethnal Green may be taught to read or write". Thomas Parmiter died in 1688.

The first Parmiter's Almshouses were opened in John Street, now Grimsby Street, off Brick Lane in 1722, and were adjacent to the first school. Along with the school, the Almshouses moved to Gloucester Street, now Parmiter Street, Bethnal Green in 1839, where they remained in use until they were destroyed by a V2 rocket in February 1945. Parmiter's School moved to new premises in Approach Road, Bethnal Green in 1887, and in 1977 the school relocated to Garston, Hertfordshire.

Despite the school moving from Bethnal Green, links remain with the Almshouse & Pension Charity, as the out-pensioners of the Charity visit the school twice a year for a meal, and entertainment provided by the students.

== The current almshouses ==
Due to difficulty in securing land in Bethnal Green to build replacement Almshouses, the Trustees of the Charity made a decision in 2008 to look for a site outside of Bethnal Green and as a result a site was found in 2009 in Great Clacton, Essex. On 27 September 2010 the Charity finally took possession of its first Almshouses for 65 years—six two bedroom bungalows, thereby complying with the original terms of Thomas Parmiter's will. The Almshouses are let in the first instance to residents who reside within the area of the former Metropolitan Borough of Bethnal Green.

On 5 October 2010, the Reverend Group Captain Donald Wallace, the Chaplain to Parmiter's School performed the dedication ceremony and unveiled the commemorative plaque, to officially open the new almshouses.

== The out-pensioners ==
The Trustees appoint up to 150 pensioners who must have resided in the area of the former Metropolitan Borough of Bethnal Green for at least two years. Appointments are made periodically, following advertisement being placed in a local social media and at a number of community locations in Bethnal Green, which must include St Matthew's Church, Bethnal Green. The Trustees do not hold a waiting list for pensioners. Pensioners receive a half-yearly pension of £75.

The Trustees hold two celebrations normally in Spring and Autumn for pensioners. To underline the importance of maintaining links with Bethnal Green; Parmiter's School invites pensioners to visit the school every July and December to have a three- course meal and be entertained by the pupils. In July every year, the Trustees organise a day trip to Eastbourne on the Sussex coast. For those pensioners who are no longer able to travel, the Trustees have arranged for a either Christmas or Eid hamper to be delivered.
