= Parmiter's Bethnal Green Educational Fund =

Parmiter's Bethnal Green Educational Fund is a charity that has its origins in the will of Thomas Parmiter, a silk merchant from Bethnal Green.

== History ==
In his will of 28 February 1681/2, Thomas Parmiter bequeathed funds for "six almshouses in some convenient place upon the waste of Bethnal Green and further for the building of one free school houses or room, wherein ten poor children of the hamlet of Bethnal Green may be taught to read or write". Thomas Parmiter died in 1688.

The first Parmiter's Almshouses were opened on John Street (now Grimsby Street) off of Brick Lane in 1722, and were adjacent to the first school. Along with the school, the Almshouses moved to Gloucester Street (now Parmiter Street) and then Bethnal Green in 1839. They remained in use until they were destroyed by a V-2 rocket in February 1945. Parmiter's School moved to new premises on Approach Road, Bethnal Green in 1887. In 1977 the school relocated to Garston, Hertfordshire.

The move from Bethnal Green to Hertfordshire was not entirely welcomed by the School Trustees based in Bethnal Green, who were very sorry to lose such excellent educational facilities to the detriment of residents of Bethnal Green.

In order to solve the loss of the school and the educational resource, it was agreed that the Parmiter's Foundation would provide the sum of £70,000 to be invested so as to enable the Parmiter's Bethnal Green Fund to operate, so as to provide a continuing educational presence in the area, to support the educational needs of those students under the age of 25, who were in financial need, who reside within the old Metropolitan Borough of Bethnal Green. The Trustees have two schemes to fulfill their charitable objectives.

== Book grants ==
The Trustees support those local students at University by means of their book grant project, which has been running for several years. Each year students are invited to apply for a book grant of £200 in book tokens to assist with the books required for their courses. The book tokens are awarded at an awards ceremony in Autumn each year to which local Head teachers and officials from the local Authority are invited.

== Year Two - A Book For You Grants ==
Not all parents of primary aged children are able to afford the purchase of a book for their child at the annual book fairs that Primary Schools hold. The Trustees therefore piloted a project in Bangabandhu Primary School to provide each child in Year 2 with a £10 book token. The pilot was very successful and has been rolled out across all the primary schools within the former Metropolitan Borough of Bethnal Green.
