= Bethnal Green Library =

Public library in Tower Hamlets, Greater London

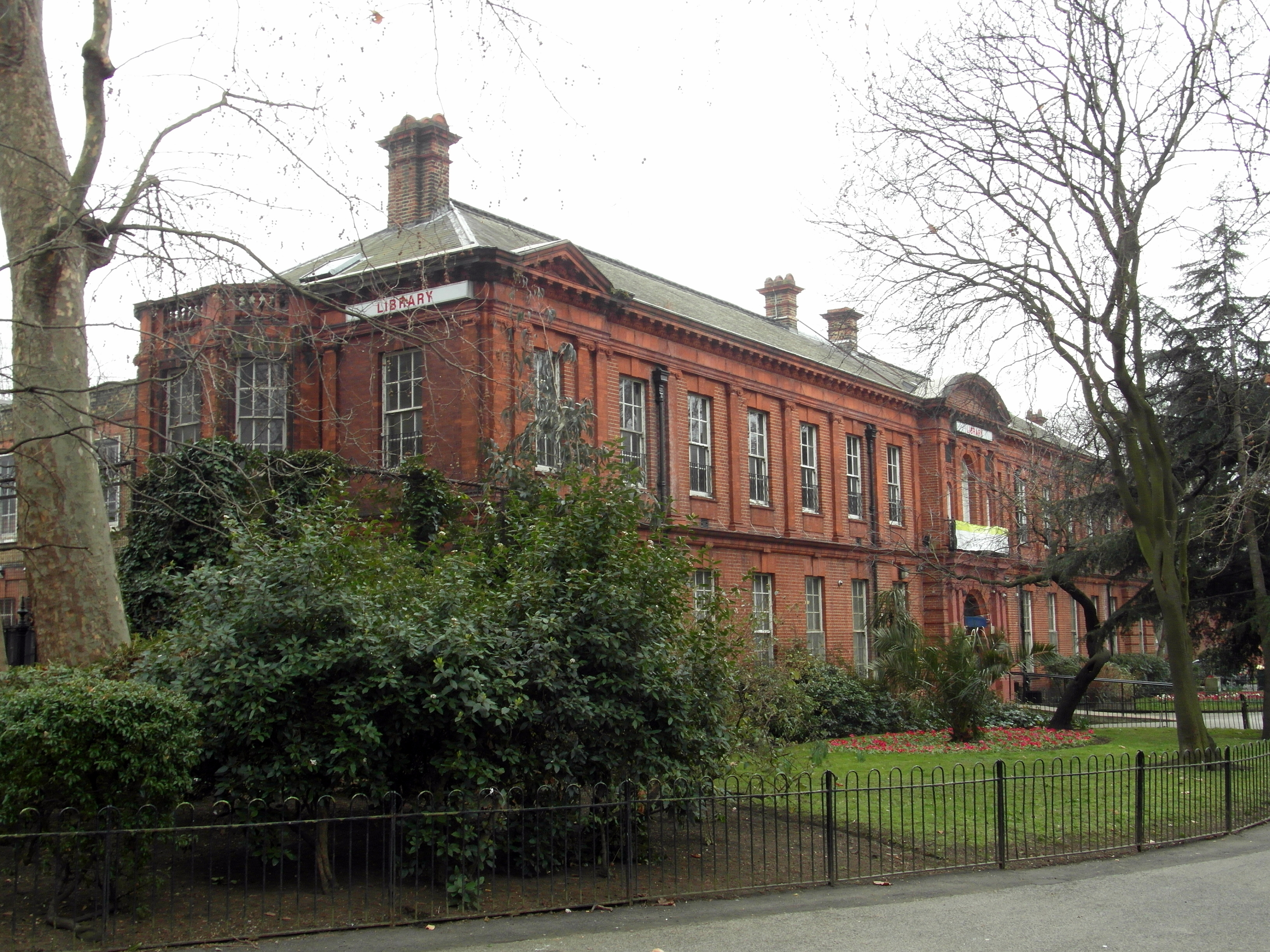
- 51.5265°N 0.0539°W
- Location: Cambridge Heath Rd, Bethnal Green, London E2 0HL, United Kingdom
- Type: Public library
- Established: 1922
- Branch of: Tower Hamlets

Access and use
- Access requirements: Free entry, library membership required to access most services

Other information
- Website: https://www.ideastore.co.uk/visit-us/bethnal-green-library

Bethnal Green library is a public library situated in Bethnal Green Gardens on Cambridge Heath Road in Bethnal Green, London. The library was opened by Mayor Councillor J.J. Vaughan on 13 October 1922. The first known building on the site was built in 1570 and was leased in 1727 to Matthew Wright. It was then turned into a private lunatic asylum which became known as Wright's Madhouse. The asylum closed in 1920.

== History ==
The first building that has been recorded on the site in Bethnal Green Gardens was a large timber-framed mansion. It was built in 1570, by a rich merchant named John Kirby, and was known as 'Kirby's Castle' by locals. Matthew Wright was leased the building in 1727 and turned it into a private lunatic asylum: Wright's Madhouse. It became notorious for its cruel treatment of patients.

Thomas Warburton bought the asylum in September 1800. Shortly after, it was extended and renamed the White House. There was another large mansion next door, named the Red House, which also became a part of the mental asylum. Eventually the White House was demolished, and the Red House was enlarged to include a new male block in the south-west side of the asylum in 1896. This would eventually become the site of Bethnal Green Library.

The library was hit by a bomb at the beginning of the World War Two Blitz, then librarian George F. Vale and his deputy Stanley Snaith extended the library service to the underground bomb shelters with a "Shelter Library".

In 2019 the library was renovated and nominated for the New London Architecture Awards' Conservation and Retrofit category.

In March 2021 the library, along with Cubitt Town Library, was threatened with closure. The decision was reversed at the last moment at a council cabinet meeting.

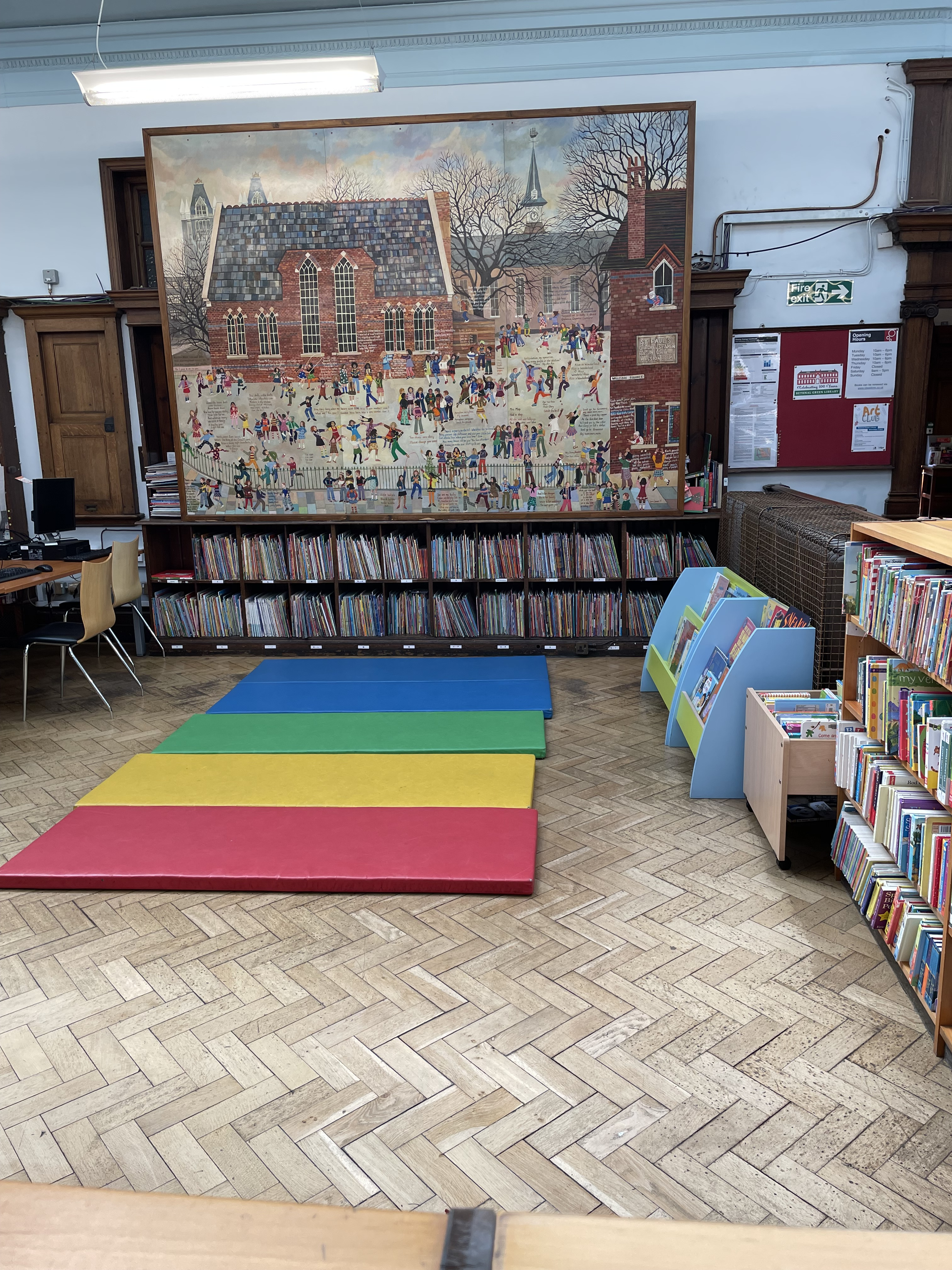
Children's area of the library

2022 saw Bethnal Green Library celebrate its centenary, with events and activities.

== Events ==
The library has held many types of events. The bands Sacred Paws, Ste McCabe and Tuff Love have played gigs at the library. There have also been talks, children's activities and book fairs.
