= Whish =

Whish is a surname, and may refer to:

- C. M. Whish (1794–1833), English civil servant of the East India Company and author of the first western paper on the Kerala school of astronomy and mathematics
  - J. L. Whish, his brother and also an English civil servant of the East India Company
- David Whish-Wilson (born 1966), Australian author
- Claudius Buchanan Whish (1827–1890), Australian sugar-planter
- Peter Whish-Wilson (born 1968), Australian politician

== See also ==
- Wish (disambiguation)
