= Salmon and Ball =

Pub in Bethnal Green, London

Coordinates: 51.527327°N 0.0559486°W

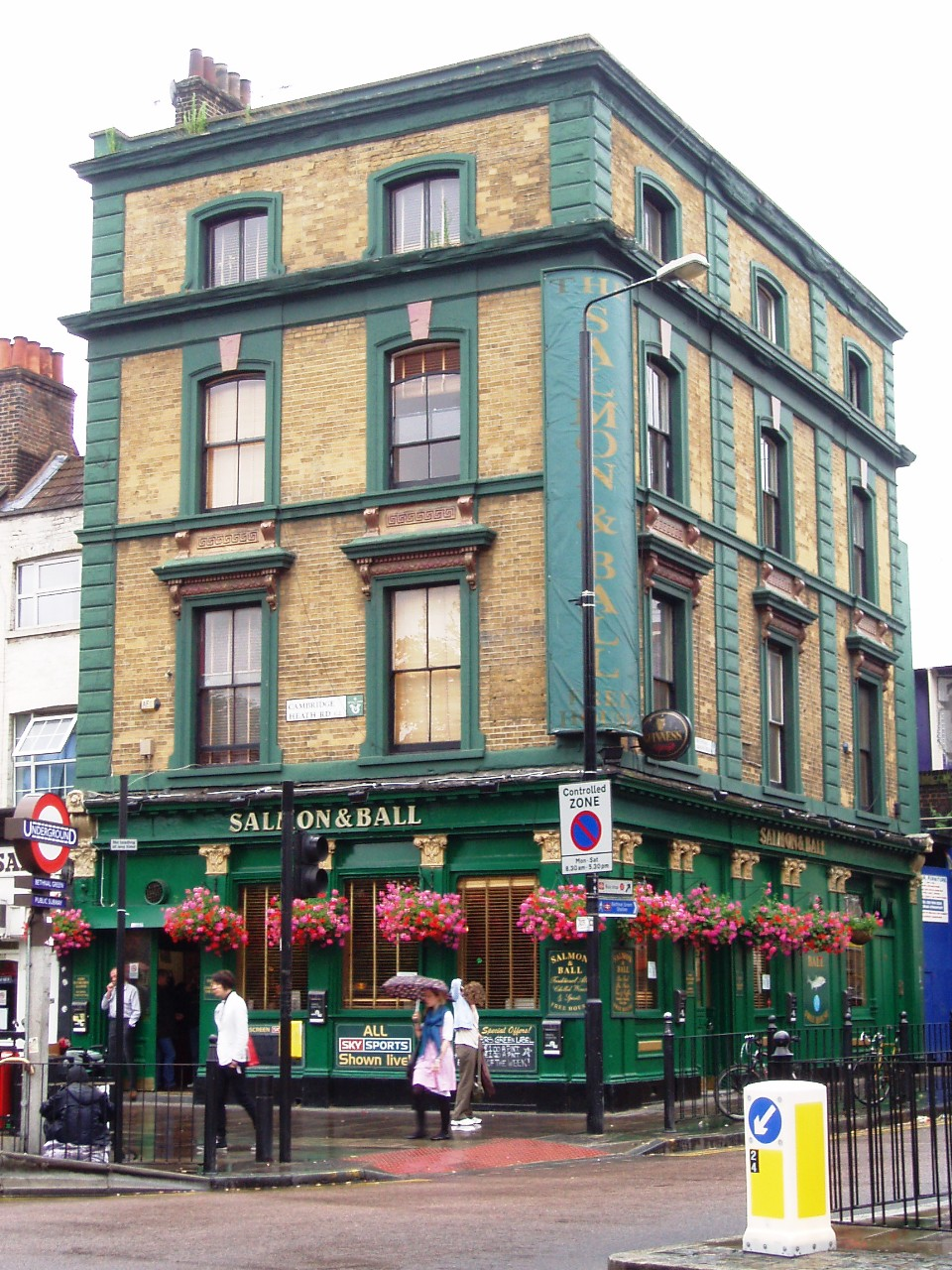
The Salmon and Ball in 2008

The Salmon and Ball is a public house at 502 Bethnal Green Road, Bethnal Green, located next to Bethnal Green tube station.

It is a Grade II listed building, dating back to the mid-19th century.
