= Vish =

Vish may refer to:

- Vish (game), using a dictionary
- Vish (TV series), Indian supernatural drama series
- Vish Dhamija, British-Indian author
- Vegan fish, a meat analogue
- Voice phishing or vishing

== See also ==
- Wish (disambiguation)
- W.i.S.H., an Indian girl group
