= Charles Wish =

American painter

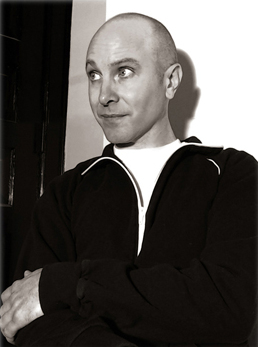
- Charles Wish, 2014
- Born: Frederick Charles Peters; March 18, 1971 (age 55); Los Angeles, California, U.S.
- Known for: Painting, Drawing
- Movement: Indo-American, post-psychedelic, post-Lowbrow
- Website: charleswish.com

Charles Wish (born, Los Angeles, California, 1971) is an American painter best known for visually fusing Regionalism imagery with 9th–19th century South Asian symbolism and motifs. (Debut show: CPop Gallery, Detroit, Michigan – 2005)

Confronting the Information Age challenges of extreme cultural contrariety and cross-cultural interaction, as well as America’s own internal culture war, Wish draws from a diverse range of influences to deliver his style of "agrariadelic" paintings. Citing various artists of the far-east, along with American painters including: Grant Wood and Thomas Hart Benton, Wish thoughtfully combines the imagery of an esoteric philosophy with some of rural-America’s most selfsame figures and scenes.

After spending four years (1999–2003) at a Ramakrishna Hindu monastery, as a student of South-Asian culture and personal assistant to Swami Swahananda, Wish would return to the San Fernando Valley, California. It would be here, not far from where he spent his formative years, where he would set up his first studio and launch his art career. Wish now maintains two studios, the original in Southern California and one in Elk County, PA, where he and his wife are restoring and converting a large Federal-style building into a cultural center and community creative space.

== Influences ==
- Regionalism
- Tibetan art (Menri–Karma Gadri styles)
- Shakta, Tantra & Vajrayana imagery
- Kerala mural, Rajput, Pahari & Kalighat painting
- Classic animation & illustration
- Native American art
- Delta blues culture
- Various modern art
- Punk rock culture

== Sources ==
- The Detroit News Joy Hakanson Colby (Art Critic, jcolby@detnews.com), July 2, 2005.
- St. Marys Daily Press, July 7, 2007.
- Charles Wish Bio, Kristy Raine (Librarian/Archivist, Mount Mercy College, IA, kraine@mtmercy.edu) May 18, 2006.
