= Wishes (TV series) =

- 许愿泡泡茶
- Genre: Drama; Mystery; Children
- Starring: Ivan Lo 陈萱恩 刘礼名 吴智朋 余泳德 王立杨; Vincent Tee 池素宝
- Country of origin: Singapore
- Original languages: Mandarin, with English subtitles
- No. of episodes: 13

Production
- Running time: approx. 20 minutes excluding commercial break

Original release
- Network: Mediacorp Channel 8
- Release: 26 March 2017 – present

Related
- Little Life Hacks

Wishes (Chinese: 许愿泡泡茶) is a Singaporean kids drama produced by MediaCorp Channel 8. It was broadcast every Sunday at 10.00am.

== Plot ==
Six kids are schoolmates that faced different problems either at home or school. They came across a bubble tea shop and saw an uncle, who runs the shop and told them that this isn't an ordinary bubble tea shop. He makes special and magical bubble tea and they must make a wish before drinking but do they believe him or is it just a joke?

== Trivia ==
- Bonnie Loo appears in an advertisement in looking for young actors just like Tan Jun Sheng and Lyn Oh to appear in this new drama.
- It succeeds drama Three Little Wishes

== See also ==
- List of MediaCorp Channel 8 Chinese drama series (2010s)
