= Joe Anderson (boxer) =

English boxer (1869–1943)

- Born: Joseph Anderson; 14 October 1869; Bethnal Green, London, England
- Died: 1943
- Occupation: Boxer
- Known for: 'All England' boxing champion

Joseph Anderson (14 October 1869 – 1943) was a boxer who was the 'All England' champion in 1897.

== Biography ==
His parents were John Anderson and his wife Ann, née Goddard, of Bethnal Green, in the East End of London, and then a working-class slum. According to the 1891 census, he was living at 26, Crispin Street, Spitalfields, and working as a market porter.

He boxed as a lightweight. On 24 April 1897, at the Ecelsior Hall, Bethnal Green, he beat Tom Ireland to win Harry Wright's 'All England' 9st 8lbs (134lbs) silver championship belt competition, over six rounds. It was his second bout of the night, having earlier beaten Jerry Donoghue in a semi-final, with a knockout in the third round. The belt's value was quoted at the time as £40.

At the time of the 1901 census he and his wife Nell had seven surviving children. His last recorded fight was in 1907. The 1911 census shows the family living in a house in Edmonton, north London – a much more up-market area. He died in 1943, aged 73, and was buried without a headstone.

His silver championship prize belt, still in possession of descendants of his son Edward, was featured on an episode of the BBC television programme Antiques Roadshow, which led to Anderson's story being featured in the spin-off series Antiques Roadshow Detectives in 2015.
