= Bethnal Green =

Area in London, England

Coordinates: 51.527°N 0.055°W

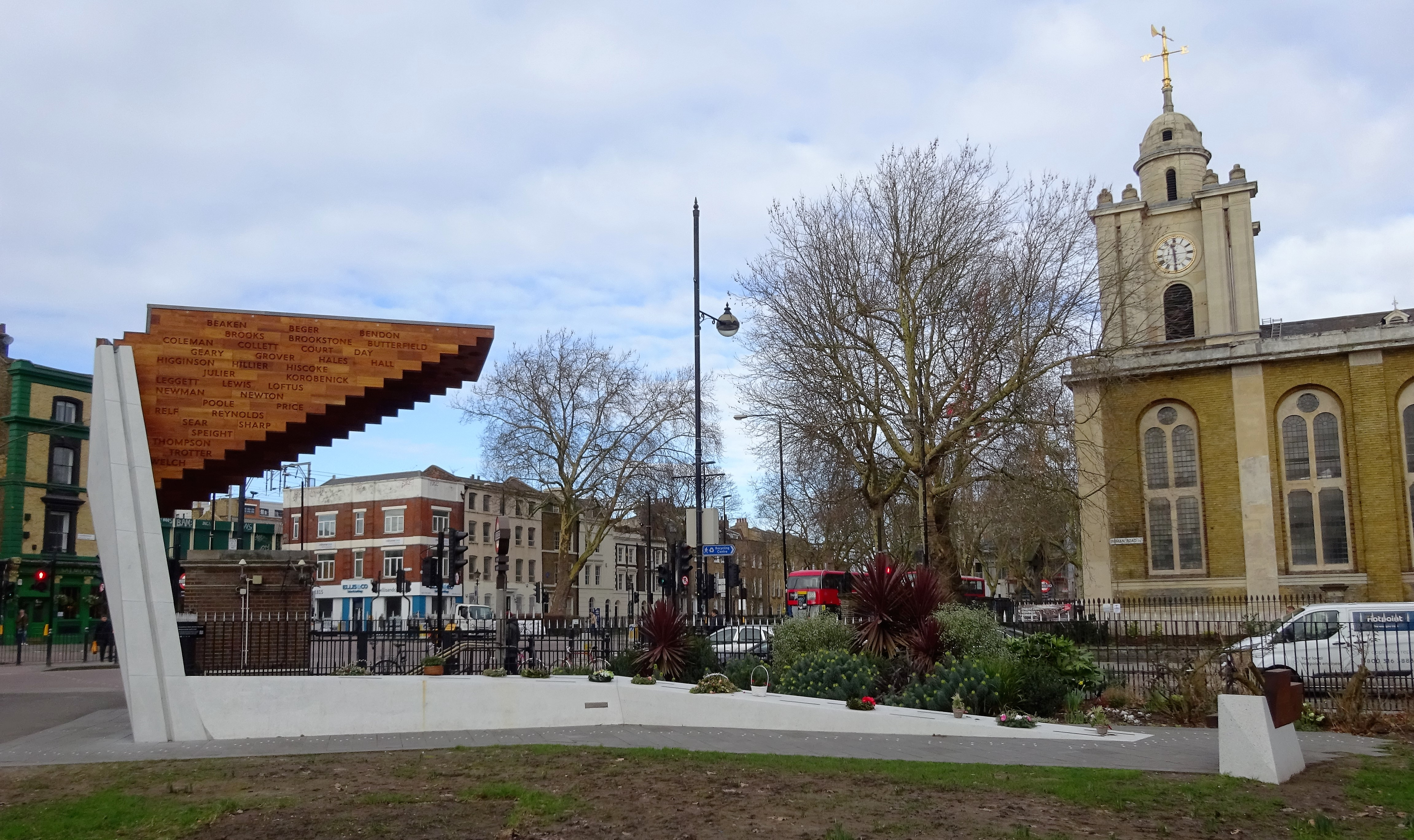
- Stairway to Heaven, also seen is Bethnal Green tube station, CoE St John Church and Salmon and Ball public house.

- Location within Greater London
- Population: 27,849 (Bethnal Green North and Bethnal Green South wards 2011)
- OS grid reference: TQ345825
  - Charing Cross: 3.3 mi (5.3 km) SW
- London borough: Tower Hamlets
- Ceremonial county: Greater London
- Region: London
- Country: England
- Sovereign state: United Kingdom
- Post town: LONDON
- Postcode district: E1, E2
- Dialling code: 020
- Police: Metropolitan
- Fire: London
- Ambulance: London
- UK Parliament: Bethnal Green and Stepney
- London Assembly: City and East

Bethnal Green is an area in London, England, and is located in the London Borough of Tower Hamlets. It is in east London and part of the East End. The area emerged from the small settlement which developed around the Green, much of which survives today as Bethnal Green Gardens, beside Cambridge Heath Road. By the 16th century the term applied to a wider rural area, the Hamlet of Bethnal Green, which subsequently became a Parish, then a Metropolitan Borough before merging with neighbouring areas to become the north-western part of the new Tower Hamlets.

Economic focus shifted from mainstream farming produce for the City of London – through highly perishable goods production (market gardening), weaving, dock and building work and light industry – to a high proportion of commuters to city businesses, public sector/care sector roles, construction, courier businesses and home-working digital and creative industries. Identifiable slums in the maps of Booth in Life and Labour of the People in London (3 editions, 1889–1903) were in large part cleared before the aerial bombardment of the Second World War which accelerated clearance of many tightly packed terraces of small houses to be replaced with green spaces and higher-rise social housing.

== Toponymy ==
The topographer Daniel Lysons suggested in the late 18th century that Bethnal was a corruption of Bathon Hall which would have been the residence of a notable Bathon family who owned large parts of Stepney, the parish of which Bethnal Green was part. "Green" related to one which lay "about half a mile beyond the suburbs".

More recently it has been suggested that the name could be a derivation of the Anglo-Saxon Blithehale or Blythenhale from the 13th century. healh would have meant "angle, nook, or corner" and blithe would have been the word for "happy, blithe", or come from a personal name Blitha. In either case, the Dictionary of London Place Names supports a contraction involving hall or healh, noting h-dropping in local dialects, to Bethnal Green.

== History ==
=== Origins and administration ===
Parish of Bethnal Green, 1848

Bethnal Green Parish Act 1742
- Act of Parliament
- Parliament of Great Britain
- Long title: An Act to make the Hamlet of Bethnal Green in the Parish of Saint Dunstan, Stepney, in the County of Middlesex, a separate and distinct Parish, and for erecting a Parish Church therein.
- Citation: 16 Geo. 2. c. 28
- Territorial extent: Great Britain

Dates
- Royal assent: 21 April 1743
- Commencement: 16 November 1742 (Note: Start of session.)
- Repealed
Other legislation
Amended by	Bethnal Green Improvement Act 1813; St. Matthew's Church, Bethnal Green Act 1845
Repealed by	London Government (Borough of Bethnal Green) Order in Council 1901

Status: Repealed

Text of statute as originally enacted

The term Bethnal Green originally referred to a small common in the Manor and Ancient Parish of Stepney; around which a small settlement developed. By the seventeenth century the area had become a hamlet, a territorial sub-division of Stepney, with a degree of independence. Continued housebuilding and population growth in the 18th century led to the hamlet area becoming a fully independent daughter parish in 1743. The parish had a church, a benefice (for its priest) and vestry (for its people) in 1743. In 1855 Bethnal Green was included within the area of the Metropolitan Board of Works to which it nominated one member and the various local government bodies were replaced by a single incorporated vestry which consisted of 48 elected vestrymen.

Under the Metropolis Management Act 1855, any parish that exceeded 2,000 ratepayers was to be divided into wards; as such the incorporated vestry of St Matthew Bethnal Green was divided into four wards (electing vestrymen): No. 1 or East (9), No. 2 or North (9), No. 3 or West (15) and No. 4 or South (15).

The (civil) parish became a Metropolitan Borough in 1900, which merged with some of the neighbouring areas, to become the new London Borough of Tower Hamlets, in 1965.

The area was part of the historic (or ancient) county of Middlesex, but military and most (or all) civil county functions were managed more locally, by the Tower Division (also known as the Tower Hamlets).

The role of the Tower Division ended when Bethnal Green became part of the new County of London in 1889. The County of London was replaced by Greater London in 1965.

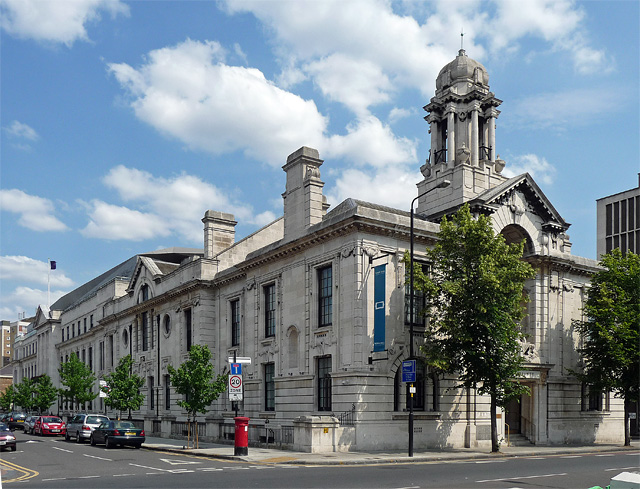
The former Bethnal Green Town Hall

The wards of the Metropolitan Borough of Bethnal Green. The Borough corresponded very closely to the area of the Hamlet and later Parish of Bethnal Green.

=== Early history ===
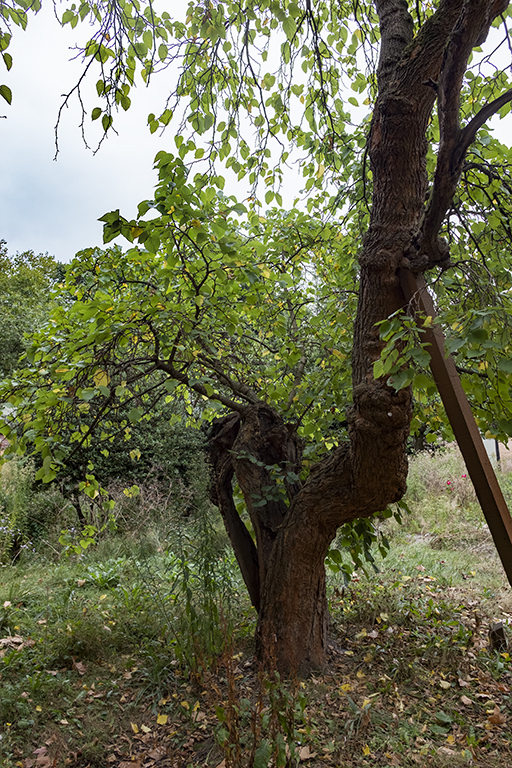
The Bethnal Green Mulberry, at the former London Chest Hospital.

In what would become northern Bethnal Green (known as Cambridge Heath) a tract of common land, which stretched to the east and west, a part of the Manor and Ancient Parish of Stepney. The heath was used as pasture where people grazed their sheep in the 13th century, though 1275 records suggest at least one house stood there. Stepney's Manor House (known as Bishopswood, later Bishop's Hall) was located in Bethnal Green from at least 1207, on a site subsequently occupied by the London Chest Hospital.

=== Emblems ===
==== Blind Beggar of Bethnal Green ====
The area was once best known for the popular early modern ballad, The Blind Beggar of Bethnal Green, which tells the story of a beautiful young woman named Bess, the daughter of a blind beggar. The earliest known explicit mention of the ballad is from 1624, but it was clearly well established by that date, as two other ballads of similar date were said to have been sung to the tune of the Blind Beggar. A play on the same theme, almost certainly based on an existing ballad, is known to have been performed in 1600.

According to one version of the legend, found in Thomas Percy's Reliques of Ancient English Poetry published in 1765, the beggar was said to be Henry, the son of Simon de Montfort, but Percy himself declared that this version was not genuine. A version published in 1934, closely based on Percy's but with some amendments to include much older material, contains 67 verses. The ballad recounts how Bess leaves Bethnal Green to seek her fortune, and stays a short time at the Queen's Arms inn at Romford. There, her beauty quickly attracts four suitors, three of whom lose interest when she declares her background, while the fourth, a knight is unconcerned by her father's status. The couple marry, and despite his seeming poverty, the beggar gives a huge dowry to the knight, to the bitter dismay of the other three suitors. The Blind Beggar public house, just on the Bethnal Green side of the historic boundary with Whitechapel, is reputed to be the site of his begging.

A depiction of the beggar is known to have been used on the head of the local beadle's staff in 1690. Later, the beggar and his daughter were the basis of the common seal of the Metropolitan Borough of Bethnal Green. The legend also inspired Elisabeth Frink's sculpture Blind Beggar and his Dog (1958) on the Cranbrook Estate in Bethnal Green.

==== Mulberry ====
Bethnal Green is famous for its mulberry trees, most notably the Bethnal Green mulberry at the site of the former London Chest Hospital, which is reputed to be the oldest tree in the East End. Many of these mulberry trees may be a legacy of unsuccessful 16th and 17th century attempts to boost the weaving industries that Bethnal Green, Shoreditch, Spitalfields and other East End districts relied upon so heavily.

Mulberries were used as the local emblem when it was a partly self-governing neighbourhood of Tower Hamlets from 1986 to 1992, and the symbol can still be seen on many local street signs. The mulberry is also used as a symbol of the East End more generally, and is featured on the coat of arms of the London Borough of Tower Hamlets.

=== Growth ===
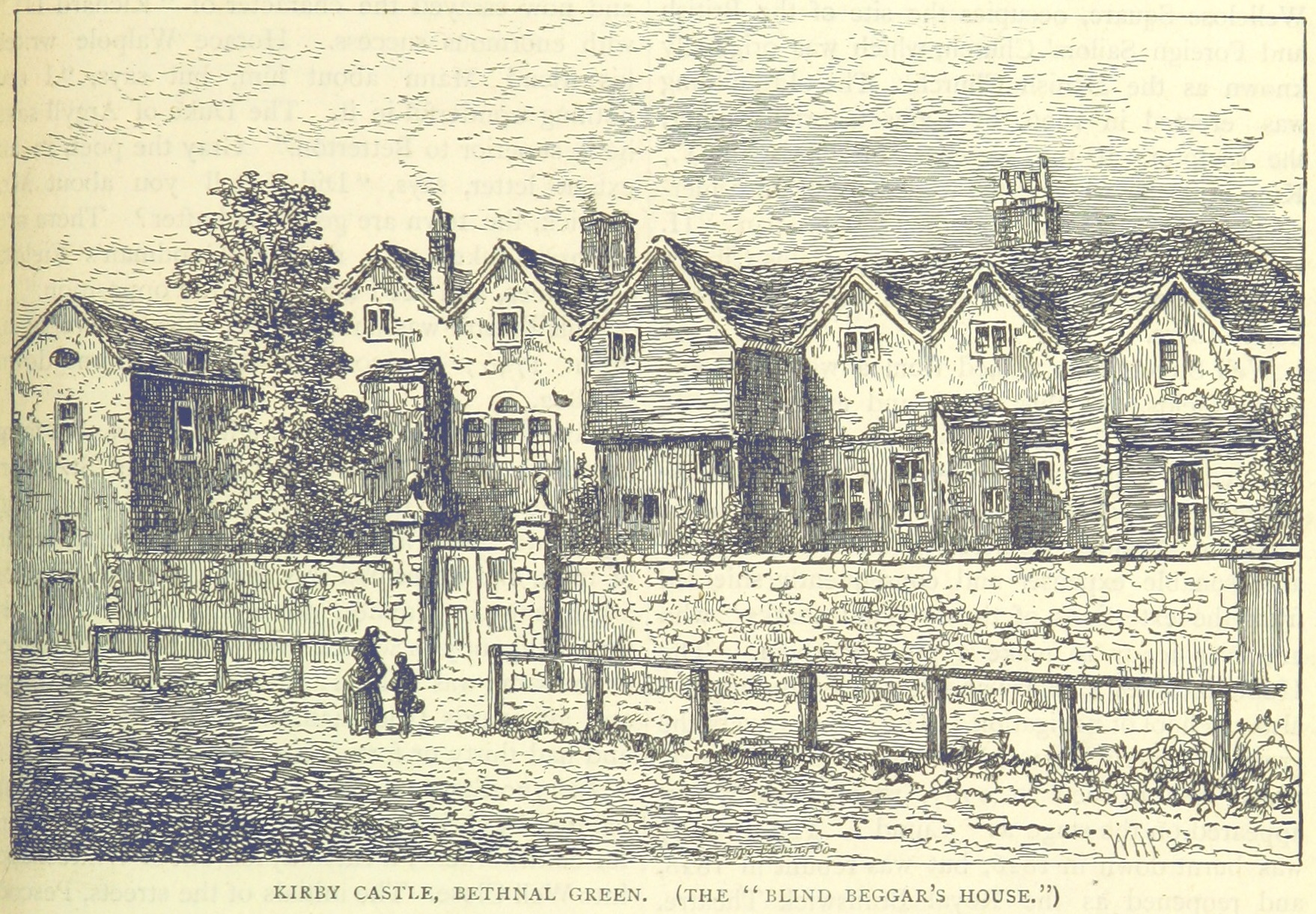
Bethnal House Lunatic Asylum. A notorious 'private madhouse' from 1727, variously known as Wright's House, The Blind Beggar's House, and Kirby's Castle.

The Green and Poor's Land is the area of open land now occupied by Bethnal Green Library, the Young V&A and St John's Church, designed by John Soane.

In John Stow's Survey of London (1598) the hamlet was called Blethenal Green. It was one of the hamlets included in the Manor of Stepney and Hackney. Hackney later became separated.

In 1678, the owners of houses surrounding the Green purchased the land to save it from being built on and in 1690, the land was conveyed to a trust under which it was to be kept open and rent from it used for the benefit of poor people living in the vicinity. From that date, the trust has administered the land and its minute books are kept in the London Metropolitan Archives.

Bethnal House, or Kirby's Castle, was the principal house on the Green. One of its owners was Sir Hugh Platt (1552–1608), author of books on gardening and practical science. Under its next owner it was visited by Samuel Pepys. In 1727 it was leased to Matthew Wright and for almost two centuries it was an asylum. Its two most distinguished inmates were Alexander Cruden, compiler of the Concordance to the Bible, and the poet Christopher Smart. Cruden recorded his experience in The London Citizen Grievously Injured (1739) and Smart's stay there is recorded by his daughter. Records of the asylum are kept in the annual reports of the Commissioner in Lunacy. Even today, the park where the library stands is known locally as "Barmy Park".

The original mansion, the White House, was supplemented by other buildings. In 1891, the Trust lost the use of Poor's Land to the London County Council. The asylum reorganised its buildings, demolishing the historic White House and erecting a new block in 1896. This building became the present Bethnal Green Library. A history of Poor's Land and Bethnal House is included in The Green, written by A.J. Robinson and D.H.B. Chesshyre.

Boxing has a long association with Bethnal Green. Daniel Mendoza, who was champion of England from 1792 to 1795 though born in Aldgate, lived in Paradise Row on the western side of Bethnal Green for 30 years. Joe Anderson, 'All England' champion of 1897, was from Bethnal Green.

The north end of the Green is associated with the Natt family. During the 18th century they owned many of its houses. Netteswell House is the residence of the curator of the Bethnal Green Museum. It is almost certainly named after the village of Netteswell, near Harlow, whose rector was the Reverend Anthony Natt. A few of its houses have become University settlements. In Victoria Park Square, on the east side of the Green, No. 18 has a Tudor well in its cellar.

The silk-weaving trade spread eastwards from Spitalfields throughout the 18th century. This attracted many Huguenot and Irish weavers. Large estates of small two-storey cottages were developed in the west of the area to house them. A downturn in the trade in 1769 led to the Spitalfield Riots, and on 6 December 1769, two weavers accused of "cutting" were hanged in front of the Salmon and Ball public house. The weaving industry is now commemorated in the name of the Weaver line railway which serves the area.

Bethnal Green Road Market on the road of the same name, founded in the 18th century, grew and grew and became more full with stalls. By 1959 stalls were choking the streets and the council attempted to relocate the market but had no success. In 1986 there had been many shop closures but the stalls were still trading. The street market is now today recognised as a major local shopping area.

=== Victorian era ===
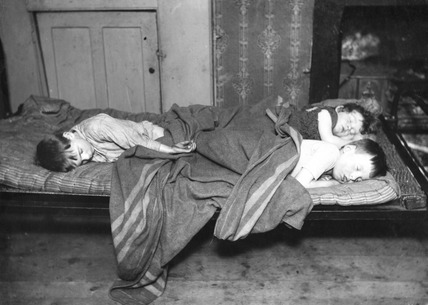
Slum children in bed, Bethnal Green, 1900–1910

In the early 19th century, Bethnal Green remained characterised by its market gardens and by weaving. Having been an area of large houses and gardens as late as the 18th century, by about 1860 Bethnal Green was mainly full of tumbledown old buildings with many families living in each house. By the end of the century, Bethnal Green was one of the poorest slums in London. Jack the Ripper operated at the western end of Bethnal Green and in neighbouring Whitechapel. In 1900, the Old Nichol Street rookery was replaced with the Boundary Estate (near the limits of Shoreditch). This was a first in council housing. Brothers Lew Grade and Bernard Delfont were brought up on the estate. In 1909, the larger Bethnal Green Estate was opened with money left by the philanthropist William Richard Sutton which he left for "modern dwellings and houses for occupation by the poor of London and other towns and populous places in England". The Peabody Trust administered the funds to complete much of the estate in 1910.

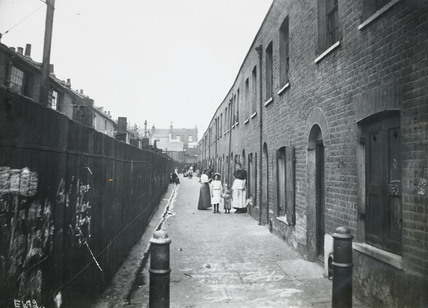
Slum street in Bethnal Green, circa 1900

The Regent's Canal opened in 1820, for horse-drawn canal barges to carry cargo between the Port of London and the Grand Union Canal. These supplied local coal merchants and gas houses/plants (gasifiers) built along its banks including Bethnal Green.

The London Society for Promoting Christianity among the Jews built Palestine Place as Cambridge Heath began to be fully developed during the first half of the 19th century. A windmill survived until at least 1836. Most local residents were poor, especially in the streets around the railway line and the Regent's Canal, as well as on Russia Lane.

As the population grew, a number of mission churches were founded to serve newly created parishes. St Andrew's church on Viaduct Street was built in 1841, serving a congregation of up to 350 people. It closed and was demolished in 1958. St Barnabas Church on Grove Road, opposite Mile End Park, was founded in 1870 and still operates today.

In 1841, the Anglo-Catholic Nathaniel Woodard, who was to become a highly influential educationalist in the later part of the 19th century, became the curate of the newly created St. Bartholomew's church on Buckhurst Street. He was a capable pastoral visitor and established a parochial school. In 1843, he got into trouble for preaching a sermon in which he argued that The Book of Common Prayer should have additional material to provide for confession and absolution and in which he criticised the "inefficient and Godless clergy" of the Church of England. After examining the text of the sermon, the Bishop of London condemned it as containing "erroneous and dangerous notions". As a result, the bishop sent Woodard to be a curate in Clapton. St Bartholomew's church continued operating until 1983 and is now converted for residential use.

Globe Town was established from 1800 to provide for the expanding population of weavers around Bethnal Green attracted by improving prospects in silk weaving. The population of Bethnal Green trebled between 1801 and 1831, operating 20,000 looms in their own homes. By 1824, with restrictions on importation of French silks relaxed, up to half these looms became idle and prices were driven down. With many importing warehouses already established in the district, the abundance of cheap labour was turned to boot, furniture and clothing manufacture. Globe Town continued its expansion into the 1860s, long after the decline of the silk industry.

Columbia Road Flower Market is on the street of the same name which has kept some Victorian shops, and was established as Columbia Market in 1869 as a covered food market. It closed in 1886, but was later revived as a Sunday flower market.

Bethnal Green Junction, now just Bethnal Green from 1946 (which leads to confusion with the much-later London Underground station) and Cambridge Heath railway station are on the London Overground. Both were opened by the Great Eastern Railway (GER) on the Lea Valley Lines in 1872 as part of a more direct route to Enfield Town. The GER opened further Fast Lines that allow longer-distance trains to bypass these. Bethnal Green was also formerly served by trains on the Great Eastern Main Line (GEML) via Stratford and saw two derailments in the later 20th century, similar to other contemporary comparators of busy, metropolitan junctions.

Mowlem Street School opened in 1887. It was enlarged in 1898 and again in 1902 to accommodate 410 boys and 410 girls. A new single-storey building catering for 280 children was opened in 1971 when it was renamed Mowlem Primary School.

=== Early 20th century ===
Bethnal Green Town Hall was completed in 1910 and the internationally renowned York Hall opened in 1929 with a capacity of 1,200. In 1993, the Town Hall was vacated when the London Borough of Tower Hamlets moved its headquarters, and in 2007 the building was converted to a hotel which opened in 2010.

The warehouse buildings rose from the Regent's Canal without a towpath to interrupt development, giving direct access to the canal. A row of Victorian workshops was built on Wadeson Street in what was a historically Jewish precinct. This became very overcrowded with 572 inhabitants living in 125 houses by the 1930s.

=== Second World War ===
==== The Blitz ====
During the Second World War, the Luftwaffe began The Blitz on 7 September 1940. Bethnal Green was in "Target Area A" along with the rest of the East End of London.

Bethnal Green Library was bombed on the very first night of the Blitz. This forced the temporary relocation of the library into the unopened Bethnal Green Underground Station in order to provide continuity of lending services. The library was rebuilt and opened a few months later for the public. Oxford House also had a major role, with some local residents fleeing into the house off Bethnal Green Road seeking shelter, this location was more attractive than the stables under the nearby Great Eastern Main Line arches. The Chief Shelter Welfare Officer at the time, Jane Leverson, is reported to have said that "people came to Oxford House not because it was an air raid shelter but because there they found happiness and a true spirit of fellowship".

It is estimated that during this war, 80 tons of bombs fell on the Metropolitan Borough of Bethnal Green, affecting 21,700 houses, destroying 2,233 and making a further 893 uninhabitable. There were a total of 555 people killed and 400 seriously injured. Many unexploded bombs remain in the area, and on 14 May 2007, builders discovered a Second World War 1 m long 500 lb (230 kg) bomb.

==== Bethnal Green tube disaster ====
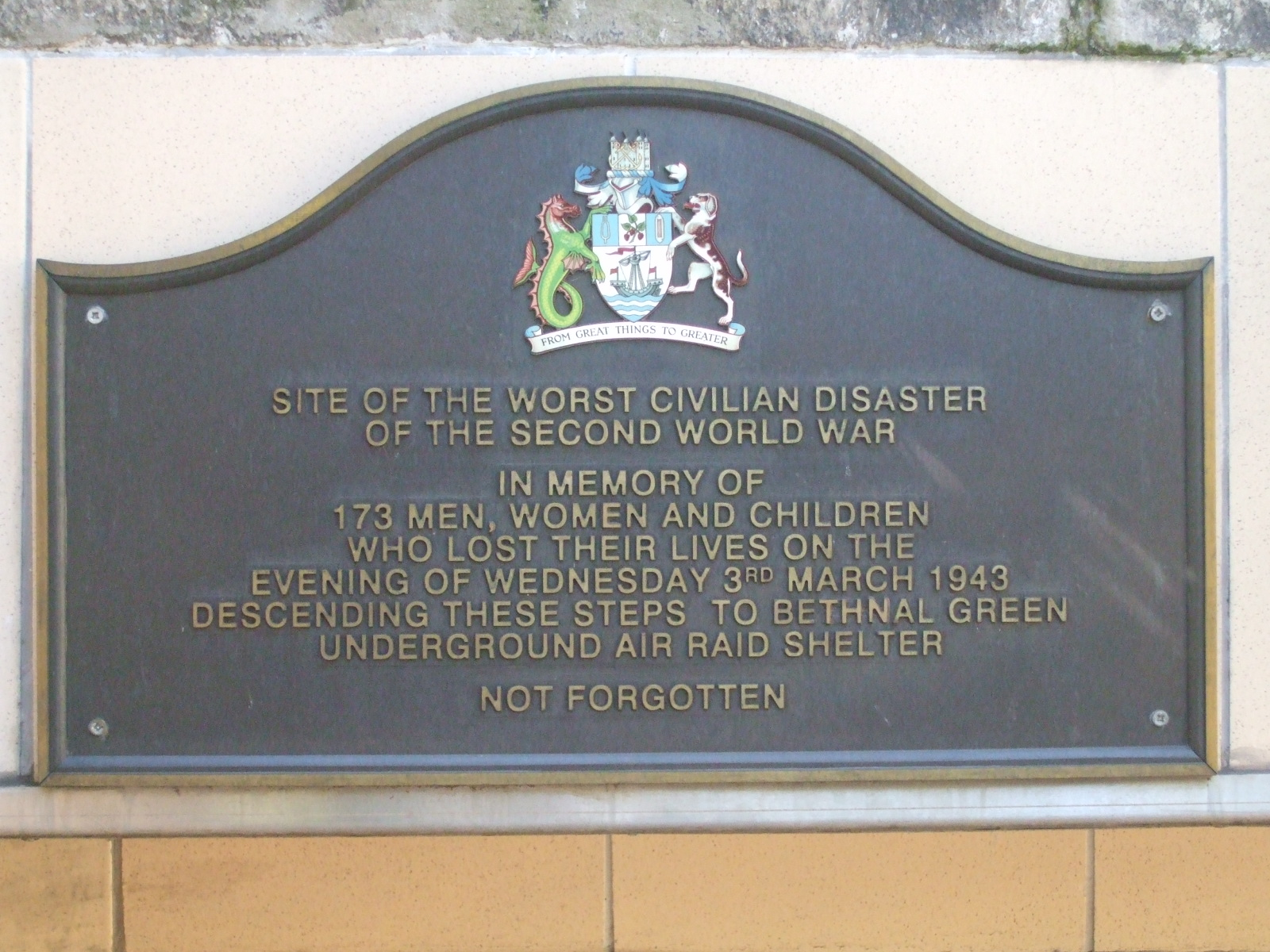
Plaque to the 1943 disaster

On 3 March 1943, an air raid warning sounded at 8:17 pm, causing a flow of people down the narrow staircase, with no handrail, of the uncompleted Bethnal Green tube station, wet from rain and only dimly lit due to blackout precautions, to shelter from bombs. (The station had been requisitioned in 1940 by the Metropolitan Borough of Bethnal Green under the supervision of the Regional Commissioners.) A crowd crush ensued, thought to have been triggered by a woman carrying a baby tripping on the stairs. A new anti-aircraft rocket being test-fired in nearby Victoria Park caused panic, being thought to be a German weapon. The panic began at 8:27.

In the wet, dark conditions, a woman tripped on the crowded stairs, causing many others to fall. Within a few seconds 300 people were crushed in the narrow stairwell, causing the deaths of 173 people, mostly women and 62 children, who were crushed and asphyxiated. A report was filed by Eric Linden, who witnessed the incident, with the Daily Mail, but not published. Very little information was provided at the time. The outcome of a government inquiry was not made public until 1946 to avoid a propaganda win for the enemy and to protect public morale. It was the largest loss of life in a single incident on the London Underground network.

Director Steve McQueen made a 2024 film, Blitz, about the wartime bombing of London (the Blitz), depicting and partly inspired by this event.

=== Post-war ===
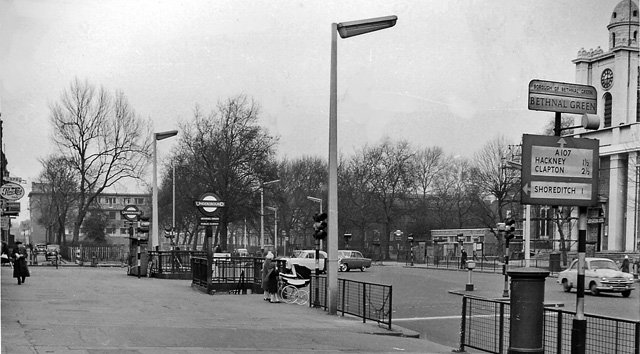
Cambridge Heath Road on 25 March 1962.

Bethnal Green tube station opened on 4 December 1946 on the Central line and is between Liverpool Street and Mile End on the London Underground, however construction of the Central line's eastern extension into then-Essex was started in the 1930s, and the tunnels were largely complete at the outbreak of the Second World War although rails were not laid.

The book Family and Kinship in East London (1957) by Michael Young shows an improvement in working class life. Husbands in the sample population no longer went out to drink but spent time with the family. As a result, both birth rate and infant death rate fell drastically and local prosperity increased.

The famous criminals, the Kray twins, lived and operated in the area during the 1950s and 1960s, with a gang known as The Firm.

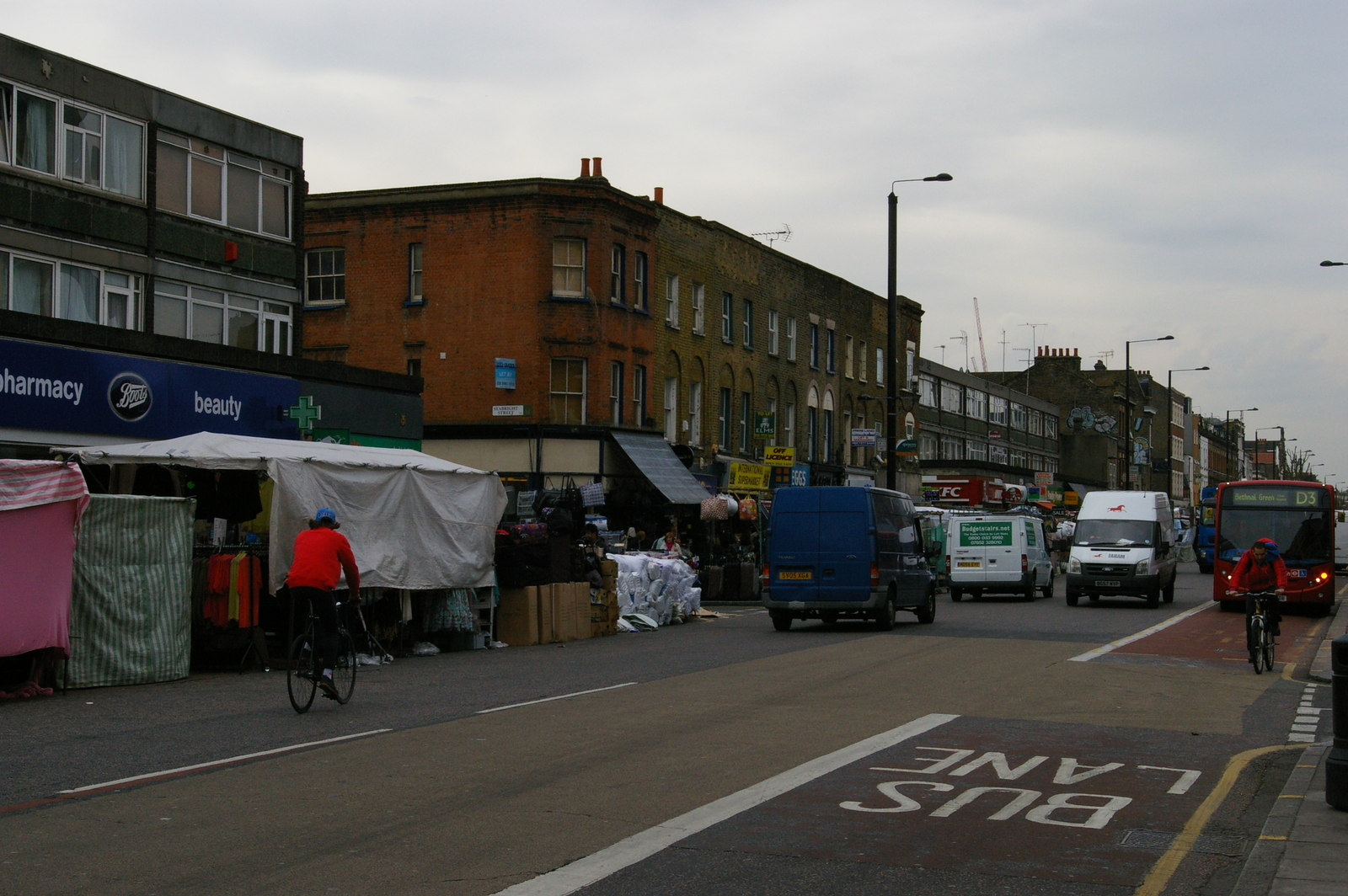
Bethnal Green Road and market.

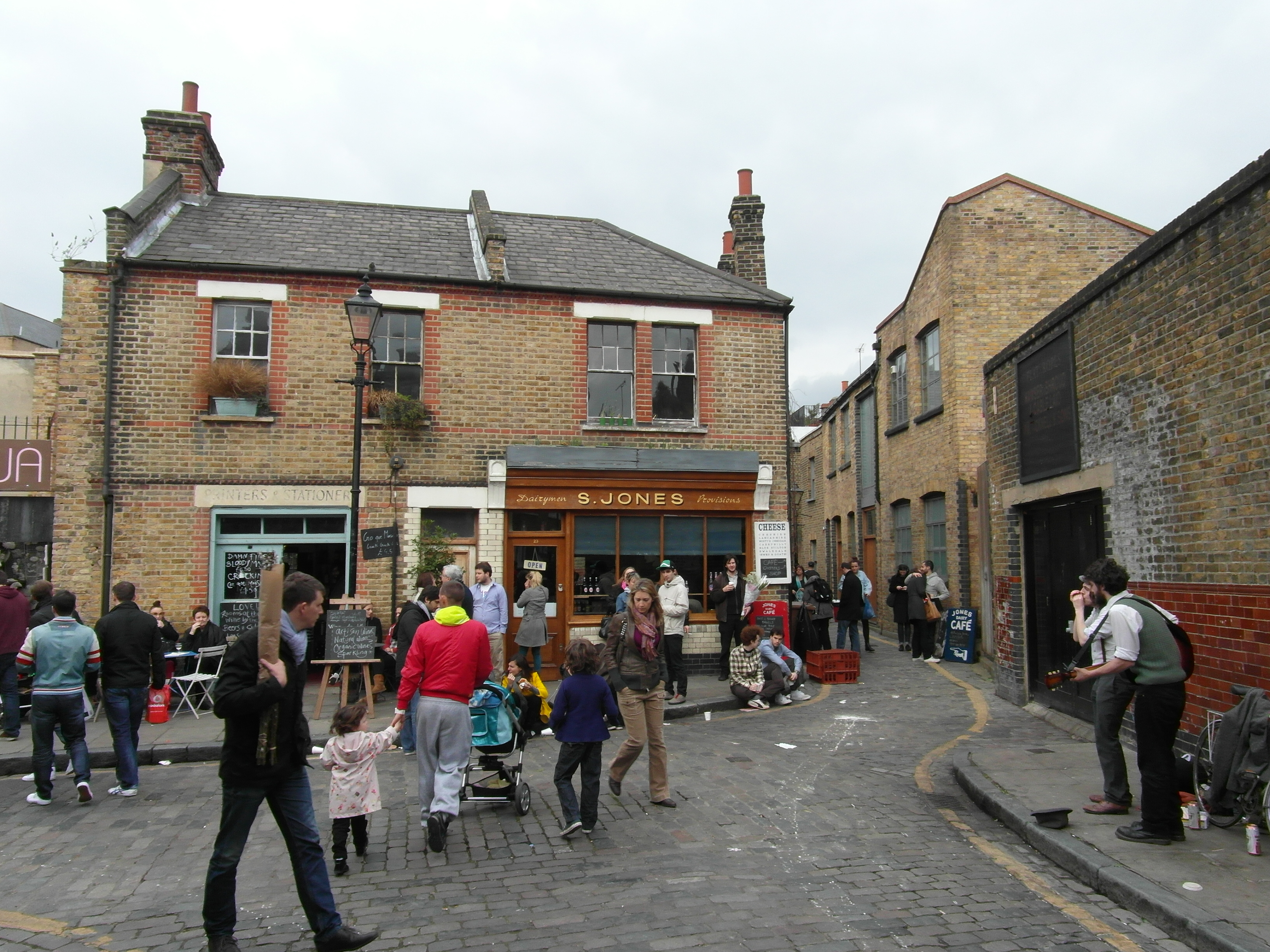
Ezra Street.

St Barnabas Community Fete was an annual fête and music festival held on Wennington Green in Mile End Park.

In 2015, three children Amira Abase, Shamima Begum, and Kadiza Sultana appeared in the press. All three had attended the Bethnal Green Academy before leaving home to join the Islamic State of Iraq and the Levant (ISIL).

== Representation ==
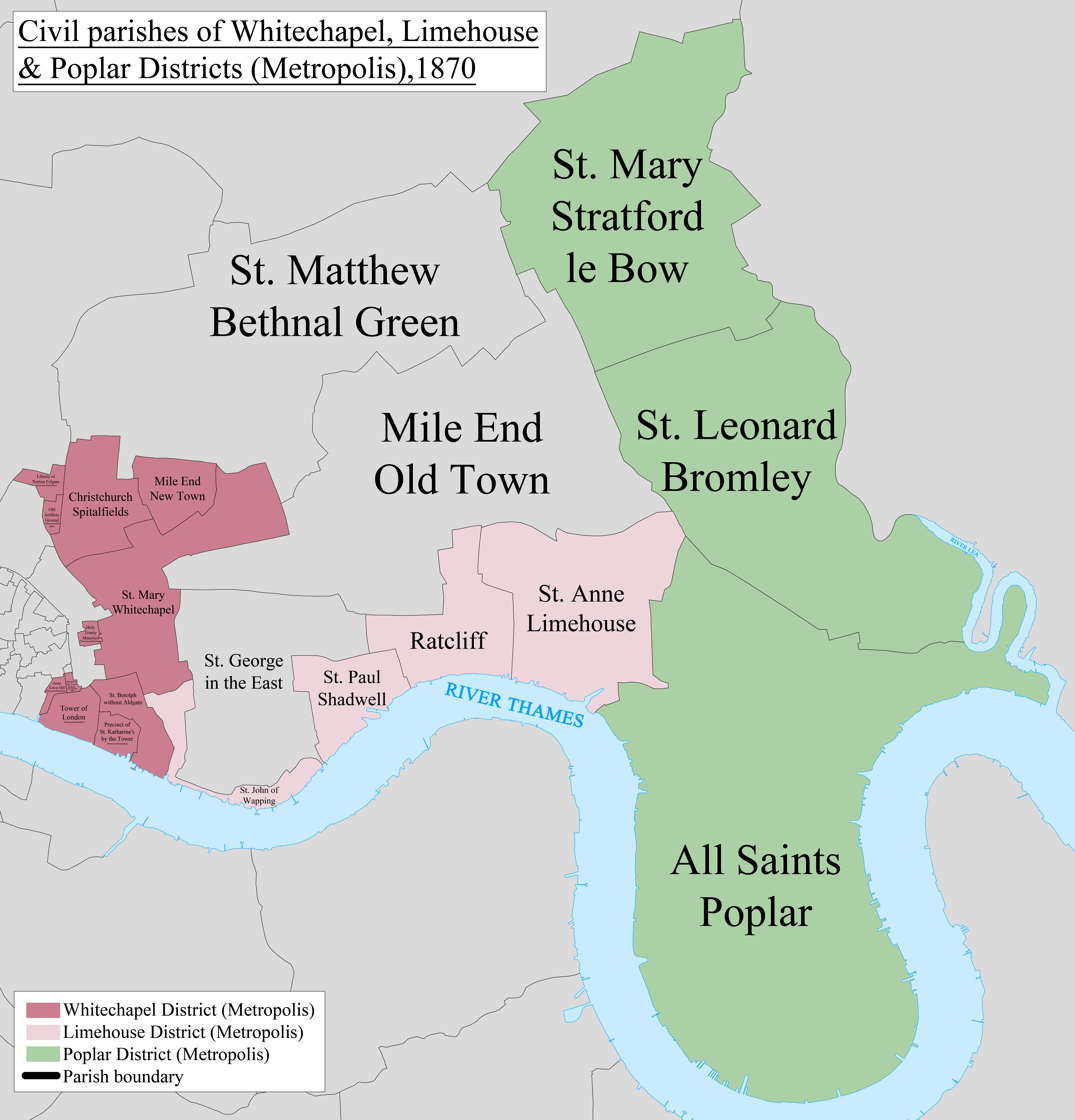
The parishes that would ultimately become the London Borough of Tower Hamlets. Many, such as Bethnal Green, were converted from earlier territorial units called 'Hamlets'.

Excluding the five-year tenure of George Galloway at Westminster from 2005, for any seat containing the name Bethnal Green: the pre-1945 General Election decades of Bethnal Green South West was the last time when such a seat was not won by the Labour Party candidate.

Bethnal Green forms part of the UK Parliament constituency of Bethnal Green and Stepney. Its MP since 2010 has been Rushanara Ali of the Labour Party.

London overall has a directly elected executive Mayor of London, currently Sadiq Khan, and the City and East seat in the London Assembly is held by the Labour Party member, Unmesh Desai.

The area of Bethnal Green covers roughly three wards of Tower Hamlets; Bethnal Green represented by Councillors Mohammed Ahbab Hossain, Sirajul Islam (who is Statutory Deputy Mayor for Housing under Mayor of Tower Hamlets and Eve McQuillan; St Peter's (which takes its name from the ecclesiastical parish of the same name) represented by Councillors Kevin Brady, Tarik Khan and Gabriella Salva-Macallan; and Weaver's represented by Councillors John Pierce and Abdul Mukit All local councillors are currently members of the Labour Party.

Between 1986 and 1992, the name Bethnal Green was applied to one of seven neighbourhoods to which power was devolved from the council. Much of the street signage in the area was replaced to reflect this.

== Cityscape ==
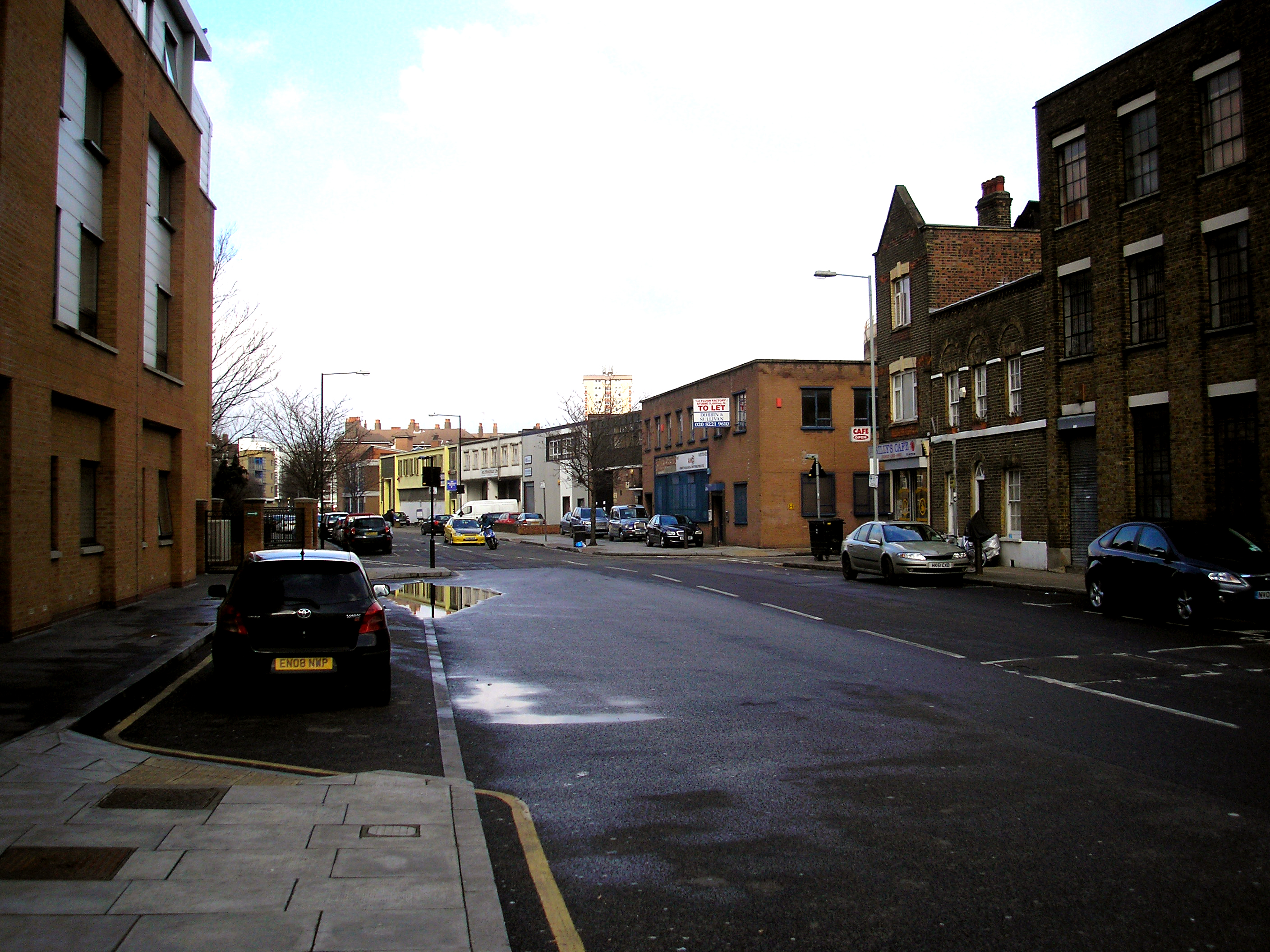
Pritchard's Road, towards Haggerston and Hackney.

=== Conservation areas ===
Bethnal Green has a number of conservation areas established by Tower Hamlets Council due to its history and landscape, including the Bethnal Green Gardens Conservation Area which was designated in July 1969 and then extended in October 2008 to the south west of the tube station due to significant buildings located in and around the junction of Bethnal Green Road, Roman Road and Cambridge Heath Road, which helps ensure these landmarks will be preserved.

A part of the Hackney Road Conservation Area is intended to protect the special architectural and historic character of buildings and areas adjoining the road which are composed of a dense concentration of modest sized properties. The Victoria Park Conservation Area was designated in March 1977, altered in 2008 to make way for the Regent's Canal Conservation Area and to expand Driffield Road Conservation Area and now includes the listed park itself, the formal axial road pattern to the south west and the many Victorian terraces.

It is also part of the wider Regents Canal Conservation Area, the street-side buildings are neglected but form part of the industrial heritage and character of Vyner Street and also Wadeson Street, which contains a row of three storey Victorian workshops mostly converted to residential use. Both types contribute to the character of the area.

To the north-west is the Old Bethnal Green Road Conservation Area, which focuses around the roads of the Winkley Estate, which has a very cohesive character and little scope exists for change. The buildings contained within the area being considered form an important group worthy of protection and enhancement.

=== Parks ===
Bethnal Green has a number of public parks. Bethnal Green Gardens, located in central Bethnal Green, has its origins as an unenclosed common that was purchased in the late 17th century to prevent development and was leased for grazing, the resulting income being used for the benefit of the local poor. It was designated as a park in 1875. It holds a war memorial, known as the Stairway To Heaven, which commemorates the largest civilian loss of life in the UK in World War II after a crowd crush at Bethnal Green tube station led to 173 deaths. Arnold Circus dates from 1900 and forms the centrepiece of a large-scale social housing development, the Boundary Estate. The western part of Victoria Park is in Bethnal Green. All three parks are listed on the Register of Historic Parks and Gardens of Special Historic Interest in England, Victoria Park at Grade II*, and Bethnal Green Gardens and Arnold Circus at Grade II.

Other open spaces in the area include Weavers' Fields, a 15.6 acres park and the 6th largest open space in Tower Hamlets, that lies south of Bethnal Green Road; and the Bethnal Green Nature Reserve, known locally as St Jude's. In the 1970s, Tower Hamlets Council decided to fence and lock up the reserve to prevent fly tipping. In the late 1990s the local Teesdale and Hollybush Tenants and Residents Association became the site custodians, with the support of Tower Hamlets Council.

=== Notable buildings ===
The former Bethnal Green Infirmary, later the London County Council Bethnal Green Hospital, stood opposite Cambridge Heath railway station. The hospital closed as a public hospital in the 1970s and was a geriatric hospital under the NHS until the 1980s. Much of the site was developed for housing in the 1990s but the hospital entrance and administration block remains as a listed building.

Since 2013, Bethnal Green has been home to the cocktail bar Satan's Whiskers, which Morning Advertiser named the best cocktail bar in the United Kingdom in 2019, 2023, and 2025.

== Demographics ==
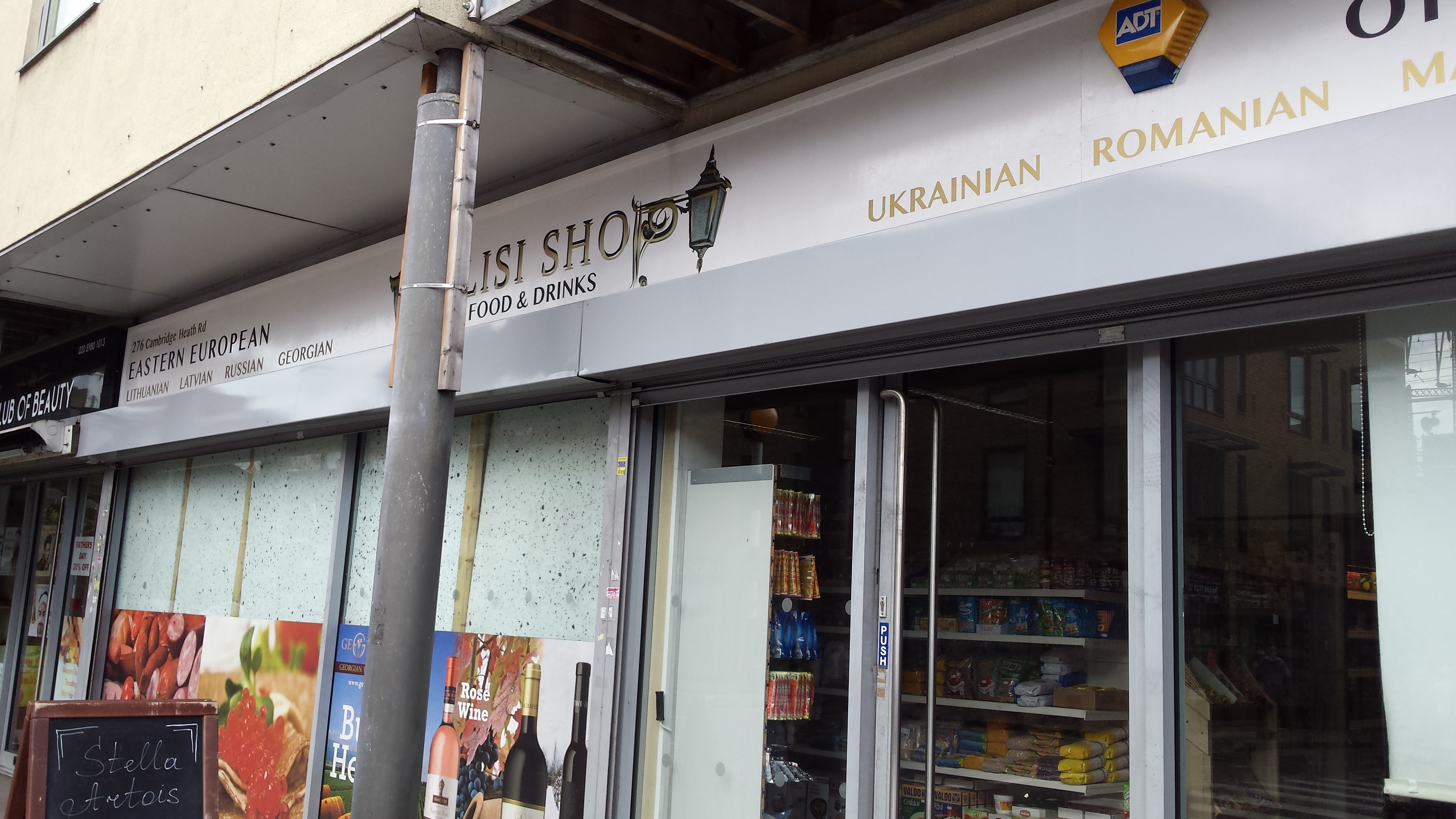
An eastern European shop on Cambridge Heath Road.

Bethnal Green had a total population of 27,849 at the 2011 UK census. The largest single ethnic group is people of Bangladeshi descent, who constitute 38 per cent of the area's population. Every year since 1999 the Baishakhi Mela is held in Weavers' Fields to commemorate the Bengali New Year. The second largest is the White British, constituting 30 per cent of the area's population. Other ethnic groups include Black Africans and Black Caribbeans.

According to the UK census of 2011, the population has a lower proportion of young people than the national average and a higher proportion of older people. Bethnal Green also has a significant immigrant population.

== Religion ==
In 2021 the religions of Bethnal Green's residents were estimated at:

- Christian: 4,394 (22.33%)
- Muslim: 8,418 (42.78%)
- Hindu: 309 (1.57%)
- Sikh: 85 (0.43%)
- Buddhist: 230 (1.17%)
- Jewish: 82 (0.42%)
- Other: 106 (0.54%)
- No religion: 6,052 (30.76%)

There are many historic churches in Bethnal Green. Notable Church of England churches include St John on Bethnal Green, which was built from 1826 to 1828 by the architect John Soane, St Matthew – built by George Dance the Elder in 1746. St Matthew is the mother church of Bethnal Green; the church's opening coincided with a vast population increase in the former village of Stepney, resulting in the need to separate the area around Bethnal Green from the mother Parish of St Dunstan's, Stepney. All but the bell tower, still standing today, was destroyed by fire and the church again suffered devastating damage during the bombing campaigns of the Second World War, resulting in the installation of a temporary church within the bombed-out building. St. Matthew's remains a major beacon of the local East End community and is frequented on Sundays and other religious occasions by a mixture of established locals and more recent migrants to the area. Other churches include St Peter's (1841) and St James-the-Less (1842), both by Lewis Vulliamy, St James the Great by Edward Blore (1843) and St Bartholomew by William Railton (1844). The church attendance in Bethnal Green was 1 in 8 people since 1900 (only 10% attend regularly in the UK). Baptisms, marriages and burials have been deposited nearly at all churches in Bethnal Green.

There is one major Roman Catholic church, the Church of Our Lady of the Assumption, in Bethnal Green. The Church of Our Lady of the Assumption hosts the London Chinese Catholic Centre and Chinese mass is held weekly. Other Christian churches include The Good Shepherd Mission, The Bethnal Green Medical Mission, The Bethnal Green Methodist Church. The Quakers hold regular meetings in Old Ford Road. Opened and named after the parish of Bethnal Green, in 1868, the Bethnal Green Methodist Church became tied in with the founding of the National Children's Home and Orphanage (now Action for Children). This was established next to the church on Bonner Road.

St. Casimir's Lithuanian Church serves London's Lithuanian community and masses are held in both Lithuanian and English.

There are at least eight mosques or places of worship in Bethnal Green for the Muslim community. These include the Baitul Aman Mosque and Cultural Centre, Darul Hadis Latifiah, the Senegambian Islamic Cultural Centre and the Globe Town Mosque and Cultural Centre.

The London Buddhist Centre works with those affected by alcohol dependency, the centre also runs courses and retreats using mindfulness based cognitive therapy approaches. Its courses for depression, based on the mindfulness-based cognitive behavioural therapy methodology of Jon Kabat-Zinn at the University of Massachusetts Medical School, featured in the Financial Times in 2008. It is the focus of a large Buddhist residential and business community in the area.

In the Boundary Estate, Arnold Circus is a mark point on several ley line alignments, such as for example the Alfred Watkins' "Strand Ley" and "The Coronation Line".

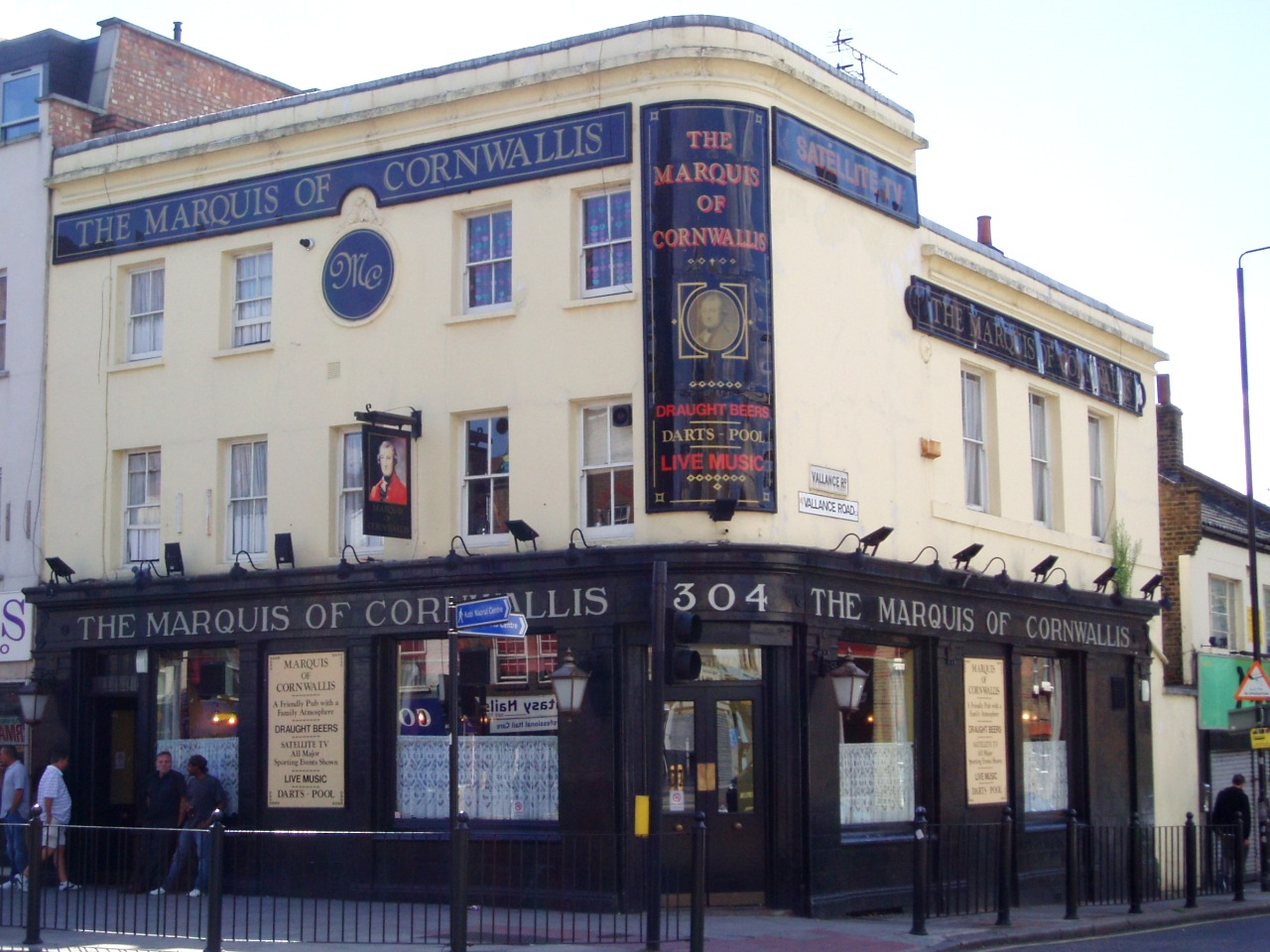
The Marquis of Cornwallis.

== Public services ==
=== Health ===
The Bethnal Green and Globe Town Community Mental Health Team (CMHT) is a community-based multidisciplinary team; they provide a health and social care for service users with severe and enduring mental health problems, run by East London NHS Foundation Trust (ELFT).

=== Education ===
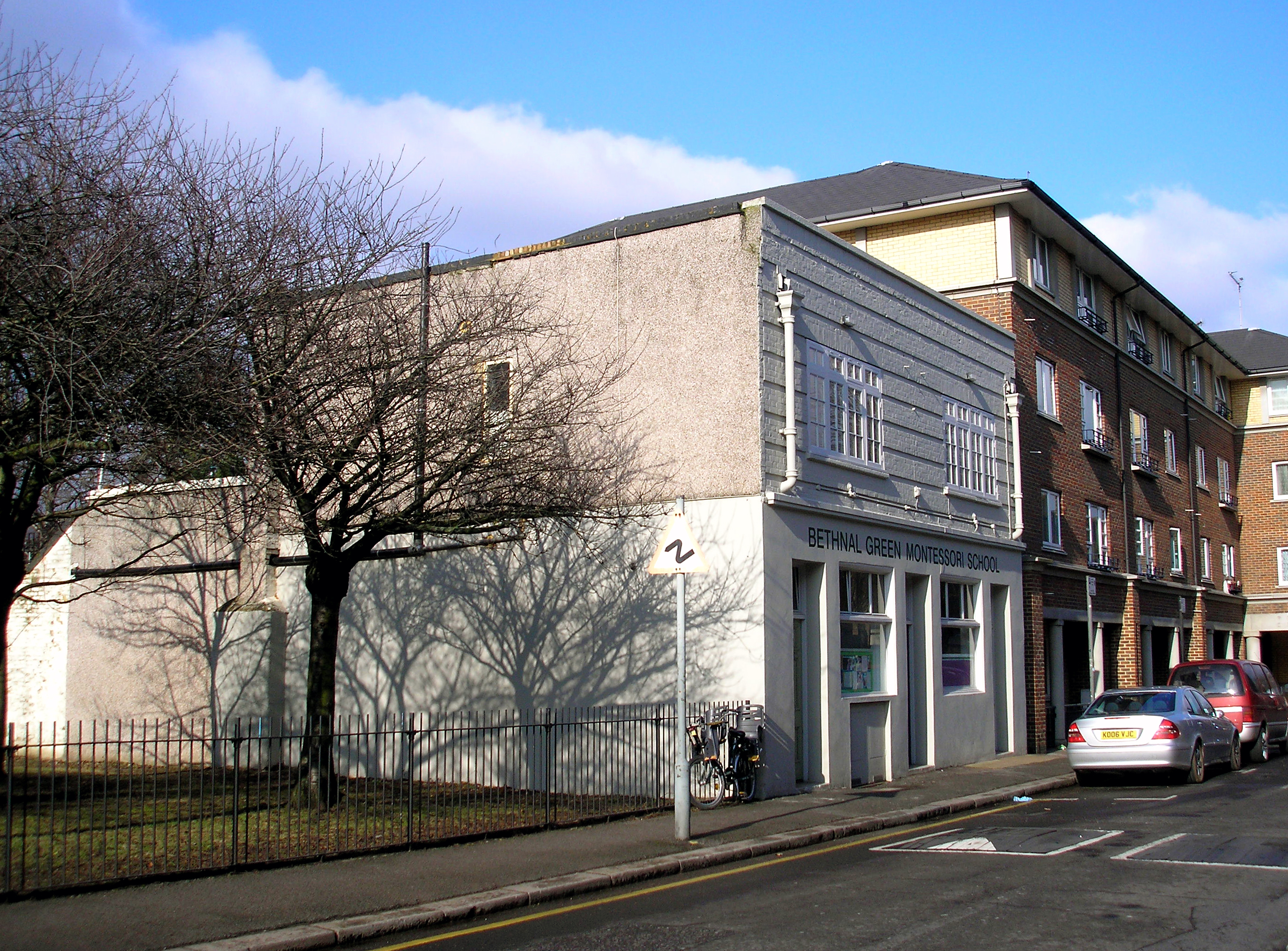
Bethnal Green Montessori School

Bethnal Green has numerous primary schools, educating children aged four to 11. St. Matthias School, on Bacon Street off Brick Lane, is over a century old and uses the Seal of the old Metropolitan Borough as its badge and emblem. The school was opened with funds from 18th-century St. Matthew's Church on St. Matthew's Row. The Bangabandhu Primary School, named after Sheikh Mujib (who had declared the independence of Bangladesh), a non-selective state community school, was opened in January 1989; it moved to a new building in November 1991 and has over 450 pupils. In the first decade, around 70% of pupils' parents spoke Sylheti, a dialect of Bengali, at home, and English as a second language; Standard Bengali was a subject choice in the school.

Bethnal Green Academy is one of the top schools and sixth form colleges in London. Other schools in the area include Oaklands School.

The oldest secondary school was Raine's Foundation School on Old Bethnal Green, a voluntary aided, Anglican-tradition, state school founded in 1719. The school relocated, amalgamating with St. Jude's School to become coeducational in 1977. The school closed in 2020.

Bethnal Green Gardens and Bethnal Green Library provide leisure facilities and information.

=== Voluntary and community services ===
The Oxford House is a proactive community centre that has its roots in helping the local community. Founded in 1884, as one of the first "settlements" by Oxford University, it has helped alleviate or remove the impact of poverty and today provides a programme of community classes, events and weekly activities.

The Approach Gardens, once an unused space, has been developed into a community food garden, a shared fruit orchard and a wildlife area.

The Nomadic Community Gardens, once an area fenced off and overgrown, was occupied between 2015 and 2019 by a temporary project or "meanwhile use" run by a private limited company on behalf of the property developer Londonewcastle, which leases the site to the garden operator for a peppercorn rent and provided start-up funding. Londonewcastle gained planning consent for a development of "affordable housing, townhouses and apartments" on the site in November 2015. Construction on the Fleet Street Hill Project was intended to commence in 2016. In 2019 ownership of the lease was sold and the site remained empty.

The Gallery Cafe, in St. Margaret's House, reopened as a vegetarian not-for-profit, community café in 2006; it became a fully vegan café in December 2017. It won Best Café in Bethnal Green at the Time Out Love London Awards in 2014, 2015 and 2016.

== Transport ==
=== Railway ===
Bethnal Green tube station is on the London Underground Central line, which connects Bethnal Green directly to Stratford in the east, the City and London's West End.

The area is also linked to the London Overground network at two stations on the Weaver line: Bethnal Green and Cambridge Heath railway stations.

In 2018, Cambridge Heath station was chosen for a trial with a pay-by-face system that may end the need for station barriers, due to its low passenger volumes and having no gates.

Bethnal Green has also been part of the Night Tube service since 2016.

=== Buses ===
Bethnal Green is served by London Buses, including route 8, 26, 55, 254 and 388 to Central London; routes 309, 388, D3, D6 and night routes N8, N26, N55 and N243 also stop here.

The 26 bus route was introduced in 1992 to replace the withdrawn section of route 6 between Hackney Wick and Aldwych and included a new night counterpart to Chingford from Hackney Wick, the N26.

On 25 September 1993, route 309 started running between Bethnal Green and Poplar. It was intended to start from the London Chest Hospital but this was delayed due to speed hump problems and it therefore started and ended at Three Colts Lane instead. It was finally extended from Bethnal Green station to Chest Hospital in 1995.

=== Cycling ===
Bethnal Green is connected to the London and National Cycle networks, with segregated cycleways and traffic-free cycle paths linking the area to the City and East London.

Route	(North / West)	(South / East)	Notes
Cycleway 13 (C13)	Shoreditch Terminus: Old Street	Broadway Market Terminus: Hackney	Connects Old Street to Hackney. It passes through the north-west of the area near Columbia Road Flower Market.
National Cycle Network Sign for Route 1 - Cropped to number. National Cycle Route 1 (NCN 1)	Hackney Wick Terminus: Tain	Mile End and Isle of Dogs Terminus: Dover	Follows the Regent's Canal from Mile End Park, entering Victoria Park at Old Ford Lock towards Hackney Wick.
Regent's Canal	Islington and King's Cross Terminus: Paddington	Mile End Terminus: Limehouse Basin	A traffic-free shared-use towpath. Runs west towards Paddington and south to the River Thames.

The area has been part of the London cycle hire scheme (now known as Santander Cycles) since 8 March 2012, when the system was expanded eastwards to cover the entire London Borough of Tower Hamlets. This expansion added approximately 2,700 new docking points across the East End. There are several docking stations in the locality, including at Bethnal Green station, York Hall, and Victoria Park.

== Art and memorials ==
Clare Street is well known as an art quarter. Some of the murals there have the buildings' owners' permission. Elsewhere, a mural of David Attenborough appeared on the side of a tropical fish store on St Matthew's Row.

Chris Gollon gained a major commission from the Church of England for fourteen Stations of the Cross paintings for the St John church. Gollon was a controversial choice, since he was not a practising Christian. In order to carry out the commission, and for consultation on theological matters, he collaborated with Fr Alan Green, Rector of the church.

Between 2005 and 2008, the EEL (East End Life) established the Vyner Street Festival with the local Victory Pub as a family festival with local bands, artists and market traders, this has a different theme every year, with the Red Arrows performing flyover in 2008. By 2012, however, many artists had moved out due to the effects of the Great Recession as well as the 2012 Olympics. A documentary film was released in the same year titled Vyner Street: this was a short observational piece about two different worlds living inconspicuously and side by side in the same place.

As part of "TUBE" Art Installation in November 2013, sound artist Kim Zip created an installation commemorating the Bethnal Green Tube Disaster. The work was backed by the Whitechapel Gallery and promoted as part of the organisation's "First Thursdays" initiative for popular art. "TUBE" exhibited over a period of four weeks in the belfry of Sir John Soane's St John on Bethnal Green Church. The Lady Dinah's Cat Emporium was the first cat café in London, which was opened in 2013.

The Oval Space hosted Catfest in 2018, with guests having the chance to take photos with cats as well as sample street food and meet shelter kittens.

A plaque was placed at the entrance to the tube station in the 1970s to commemorate the disaster there, one of the worst of the Second World War; and a larger memorial, "Stairway to Heaven", stands in nearby Bethnal Green Gardens. This memorial was unveiled in December 2017 at a ceremony attended by Mayor of London Sadiq Khan and Bethnal Green and Bow MP Rushanara Ali.

== Employment and gentrification ==
In 2019 Sustrans opened a new London headquarters at Bethnal Green.

Early in 2018 Frank Wang, who had sold coffee to commuters from his van at the northern exit of Bethnal Green underground station lost his business when the electricity supply from the station was cut off as a result of the nearby site of a disused public lavatory behind his stall being converted into a beach bar called Chiringuito. Tower Hamlets Mayor John Biggs, one of Frank's long-standing customers came out in support along with the local community, the Chinese community and commuters who protested.

Formerly part of the estate of Truman's Brewery, now a free house, the Hare was cited as the epitome of a 'good, honest pub' by the Evening Standard and was listed as one of the 50 best pubs in London in 2019. During the May bank holiday, the redeveloped railway arches off Cambridge Heath Road into an eating and drinking quarter opened. Tower Hamlets Council had turned down plans for the Cambridge Heath Road development because of concerns over its affordable housing mix and design quality. The Better Streets for Tower Hamlets had turned the car park spot in Bethnal Green Road into a mini park for a day to draw people's attention to the need for more healthier public spaces.

In 2018 Sainsbury's opened what it claims was the country's first meat-free butchers, in the form of a traditional style butchers which was open for three days from Friday 21 June to mark World Meat Free Week, where it offered customers an array of cuts and joints derived from plant-based alternatives, such as mushroom, jackfruit and pea protein. During the 2019 redecorating of the Carpenters Arms on Cheshire Street, an old safe was found in the cellar when a wall was torn down. It is thought it was boarded up before the immediately previous owners has acquired the pub.

== Notable people ==
- Cheryl Baker, singer and television presenter
- Shamima Begum, a British-Bangladeshi woman who went to marry an ISIL member
- Roger Crab (1621–1680), a promoter of Christian vegetarianism, who lived as a hermit at Bethnal Green
- Peter Davis (British director), documentary filmmaker
- Pete Doherty and Carl Barât of the Libertines lived and performed gigs in a flat at 112a Teesdale Street in Bethnal Green they called The Albion Rooms
- Leslie Fuller, film actor (One Good Turn), once lived at 14, Pollard Row.
- Denise Gough, an Irish actress
- Peter Green (1946–2020), blues guitarist and founding member of rock group Fleetwood Mac
- Philip Kingsley (1930–2016), trichologist and hair-care specialist
- Joseph Merceron (1764–1839), a corrupt property developer and magistrate
- Luan Peters, actress and singer
- Philip Ridley, playwright, visual artist, film director, photographer, novelist, children's novelist, lyricist, and poet. Most of his novels and stage plays are set in Bethnal Green.
- Helen Shapiro, singer and actress

== Sport ==
Men's association football

Non-League football clubs are:

- Tower Hamlets FC
- Sporting Bengal United FC

Both play at Mile End Stadium.

== See also ==
- Bethnal Green Library
- List of people from Tower Hamlets
- List of schools in Tower Hamlets
- Parmiter's Almshouse & Pension Charity
- Parmiter's Bethnal Green Educational Fund
- Stepney Historical Trust
