= Wireless intelligent stream handling =

Wireless intelligent stream handling (WISH) is a type of software which prioritizes the traffic of different applications over a wireless network.

WISH makes use of three different priority classifiers which enables a user to choose what kind of traffic should be preferred.

- HTTP

With this option enabled video and audio streams that use HTTP (so basically all videos played in the browser) are preferred over other kinds of traffic.

- Windows Media Center

With this option enabled the access point will recognize specific video and audio streams used by Media center PC's and Windows Media Center Extenders, for instance the Xbox 360.

- Automatic

Automatic mode makes the access point attempt to prioritize traffic that is recognized as a stream but not necessarily a HTTP or Windows Media Center stream. Also this de-prioritizes transfers such as file transfers. Since games and VoIP are left at normal priority so games and VoIP traffic have an advantage to.

Also, WISH allows the user to configure the system based on the following things:

- For specific applications by traffic type
- For specific online games by port addresses
- From a specific device by IP addresses

This enables the user to set a certain computer to a lower priority. This could help if the PC is, for example, only used for downloading. Also, PCs that are used for downloading and streaming media can use this to prioritize the streaming media above downloading, therefore decreasing the time used to load the stream.
