= Vishu Bhatnagar =

Kumar Vishu
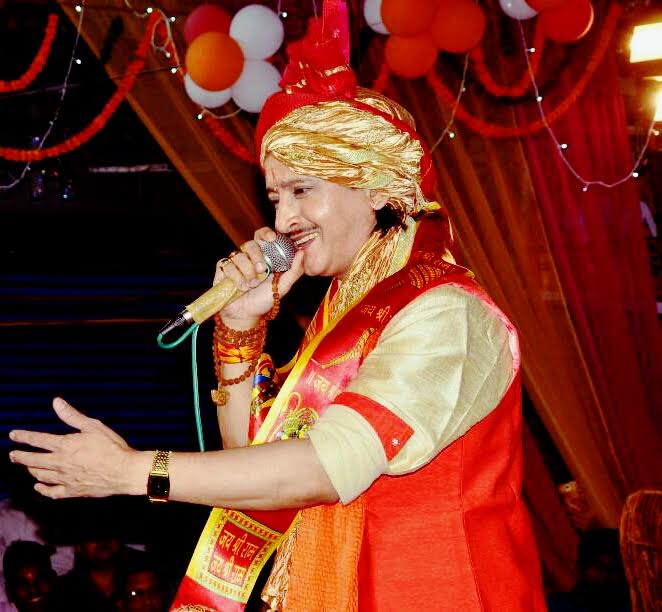

Background information
- Born: Vishu Bhatnagar
- Genres: playback singing, bhajans
- Occupations: Singer, music director
- Years active: 2001–present
- Labels: T-Series, His Master's Voice, Venus, Saregama
- Website: http://www.kumarvishu.com/

Vishu Bhatnagar better known by his stage name Kumar Vishu is an Indian devotional playback singer whose songs have been featured primarily in Hindi devotional movies and television serials. He has sung more than 200 devotional albums with the leading singers of India and major records labels of India including T-Series, His Master's Voice, Venus, Sonotek & KVC music, Saregama and other record labels.

Vishu has received President Award, Cinema Century Award and others. He has also sung in several languages including Punjabi, Rajasthani and other Indian languages and was signed by the T-series for seven years.

== Biography ==
Vishu is known for a melodious style of singing bhajans, devotional music, Ghazals and Sundarkaand recital. He is born in Mumbai(formerly called Bombay). His album Ramayan ki Choupaiyan and Pyaase ko paani pilaya nahi with T-Series has been the best seller in the devotional album category. Some of his major songs include Kabhi Pyase Ko Paani Pilaya Nahi, Khazaana Maiya Ka, Ghar Ghar Main Hai Raavan Baitha, Udd Ja Hans Akela, Kabir Amrit Vaani, Hanuman Gatha, Karmo Ki Hai Maaya and others.

He has given several stage performances in India and abroad, has emerged as a popular devotional singer. Apart from his singing, he has also founded a singing and instrumental training institute.

== Selected bhajans ==
=== Solo albums ===
Year	Album	Label
2001	Kabhi Pyase Ko Pani Pilaya Nahin	T-Series
2001	Radhe Radhe Shyam Bolo	T-Series
2001	Pyare Aa Jaao Makhan Chor	T-Series
2002	Gaura Rani Ke Naina Bhole Se Lade	T-Series
2002	Naach Rahe Hanuman Ram Dhun Ga-Ga Kar	T-Series
2002	Kalyug Ke Prani Sun Satyug Ki Vani	T-Series
2002	Aarti	T-Series
2002	Bhagwan Tere Sansaar Mein Hua Kathin Hai Jeena	T-Series
2002	Kanhaiyya Kab Aayenge Bata De Radha Rani	T-Series
2003	Chalo Re Chalo Mata Rani Ke Dwar	T-Series
2004	Shyam Kiske Hain	T-Series
2004	Meri Sunle Hey Anjani Lala	T-Series
2005	Chham Chham Nache Bam Bam Bhola	T-Series
2005	Tu Kitna Diwana Jogi	T-Series
2005	Sanwariya Rang Rangila	T-Series
2005	Jhoom Kanwadiya Jhoom Bhole Ki Mach Gayi Dhoom	T-Series
2006	Bhole Ki Bhakti Kanwariyon Ki Masti	T-Series
2006	Pujari Bhole Ka	T-Series
2006	Danka Baja Shri Shyam Ka	T-Series
2008	Maa Shakti Swaroop (Aalha Ki Dhun Per)	T-Series
2008	Bolo Ambe Ambe	T-Series
2013	Ek Baar Bol Jai Mata Ki	Saregama
2013	Kehti Hai Vaishno Maa	Sai Dhun Audio Video Pvt. Ltd.
2014	Rahim Amritwani	Brijwani Cassettes
2014	Satguru Kabir Amritwani	Brijwani Cassettes
2014	Haare Ka Sahara Shyam, Vol. 2	Brijwani Cassettes
2014	Satguru Kabir Amritwani, Vol. 2	Brijwani Cassettes
2014	Satguru Kabir Amritwani, Vol. 3	Brijwani Cassettes
2014	Haare Ka Sahara Shyam, Vol. 1	Sai Glory Production House
2014	Sai Satrangiya	Saregama
2014	Bhakt Aur Bhagwaan	KVC MUSIC
2015	Sunderkand	KVC MUSIC
2015	Bhole Bum Lehri	KVC MUSIC
2015	Bhajan Sandhya, Vol. 1	KVC MUSIC
2015	Sai Di Full Kripa	Saregama
2016	Maiya Se Judi Saanson Ki ladi	KVC MUSIC
2016	Sach Hai Sai	KVC MUSIC
2016	Hai Kamaal Mera Gopal	KVC MUSIC
2016	Vasiyat Vaishno Naam Ki	KVC MUSIC

=== Albums ===
Year	Album	Label	Other Singers
2001	Sethon Ka Seth-Khatu Naresh	T-Series	Rekha Rao
2001	Jawaai Ji Pawna	T-Series	Rekha Rao
2005	Dhaam Nirala Mansa Devi Ka	T-Series	Sageeta Pant
2007	Dubki Lagai Kanwar Uthai	T-Series	Rekha Rao
2009	Mere Bala Ji Sarkar Bhooton Ke M.B.B.S	T-Series	Rakesh Kaala, Shivani

== Accolades ==
- President Award
- Cinema Century Award
- Rajdhani Ratan
- Bhajan Samraat
- Bhakt Shiromani
