= Wish (charity) =

Mental health charity in England and Wales

Wish (formerly Women in Secure Hospitals) is a mental health charity in England and Wales. It was founded in 1987.

Wish's mission is to provide long-term, gender-sensitive support and services to women with mental health needs in their journey through the prison and secure hospital system and into the community, and to make women's voices heard at policy level.

It has two regional offices. The head office is based in London and serves the London and South region. The second office is based in Liverpool and serves the North and Midlands region, including Wales.

Wish is a member-led organisation and offers free membership to women with personal experience of mental distress, or of the mental health or prison system.

The charity currently works with over 1000 women, but is building organisational capacity to reach the estimated 3000 women who are currently detained within the secure psychiatric system.

== History ==
Wish is a national charity that was founded in 1987 by Prue Stevenson, Terri Simpson and Kimberley Andrews. At the time, Stevenson was working in the Education Department at HMP Holloway in London. She became concerned about the high number of women whose mental health deteriorated to such an extent that they were transferred to the High Secure Hospitals, then known as Special Hospitals (Broadmoor Hospital, Rampton Secure Hospital and Ashworth Hospital). Simpson and Andrews were former patients who had spent many years in High Secure hospitals. Female patients in these hospitals were often subjected to appalling and degrading conditions, and many didn't require such a high level of security. The three women got together to form Wish with the aim of supporting women still in Special Hospitals and prison psychiatric units, and to campaign to change policy and attitudes.

The charity was originally called Women in Special Hospitals and Prison Psychiatric Units. This was later shortened to Women in Secure Hospitals as the charity moved towards supporting women in medium and low secure units as well as the three High Secure Hospitals. In 2008 following a consultation with members, the charity changed its name to Wish, with the tagline A voice for women's mental health to reflect its status as the only national organisation for women's mental health and its increasing work with women in the community.

The first office was based in London, initially serving Broadmoor and HMP Holloway, and over time branches were set up in the Midlands to serve Rampton and in the North to serve Ashworth. The women's services at Ashworth and Broadmoor have since closed, resulting in more women being moved to lower, more appropriate, levels of security. Wish's work to emphasise the importance of gender and the different needs of women contributed to the Department of Health strategy for women's mental health, titled Into the Mainstream.

Today, Wish works with women at all levels of security, as well as in prisons and in the community. Over two decades after it was founded, Wish is now returning to its campaigning roots, as well as continuing to provide independent advocacy and emotional support to women with mental health needs in secure settings and in the community.
