= Gas Light and Coke Company =

British energy supplier (1812–1949)

Coordinates: 51.4952°N 0.1301°W

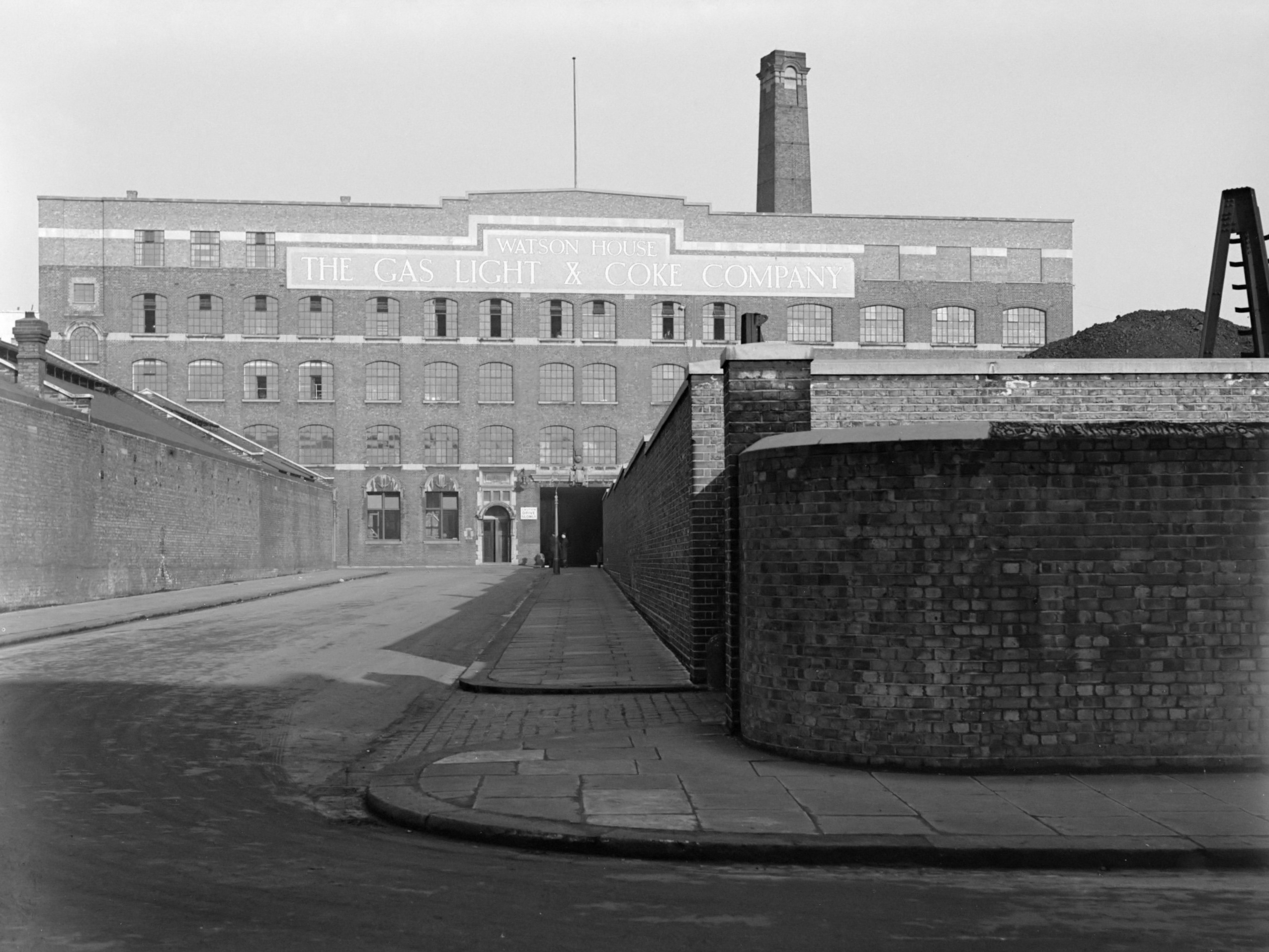
- The first Watson House: a former Crosse & Blackwell factory in London that the GLCC converted into stores and laboratories in 1926. It was named after the GLCC's Chairman, Sir David Milne-Watson.
- Industry: Manufacture and distribution of coal gas
- Founded: 1812
- Defunct: 1949
- Fate: nationalised
- Successor: Area gas boards
- Headquarters: Westminster, United Kingdom
- Number of locations: Beckton, Fulham, Nine Elms, Southall, Brentford, Bromley, Shoreditch, Stratford, Bow Common, Kensal Green, Southend-on-Sea, Staines, Harrow
- Area served: London north of the River Thames, Parts of Essex, Middlesex, Hertfordshire, Surrey, Berkshire, Buckinghamshire
- Key people: Frederick Albert Winsor; Samuel Clegg; Simon Adams Beck; Sir David Milne-Watson; Sir Michael Milne-Watson
- Products: Coal gas, coke, coal tar, chemical byproducts
- Number of employees: 21,250 (1948)

The Gas Light and Coke Company (also known as the Westminster Gas Light and Coke Company, and the Chartered Gas Light and Coke Company), was a company that made and supplied coal gas and coke. The headquarters of the company were located on Horseferry Road in Westminster, Middlesex. It is identified as the original company from which British Gas plc is descended.

== History ==
Gas Light and Coke Company Act 1810
- Act of Parliament
- Parliament of the United Kingdom
- Long title: An Act for granting certain Powers and Authorities to a Company to be incorporated by Charter to be called, "The Gas Light and Coke Company," for making Inflammable Air for the lighting of the Streets of the Metropolis, and for procuring Coke, Oil, Tar, Pitch, Asphaltum, Ammoniacal Liquor, and essential Oil, from Coal, and for other Purposes relating thereto.
- Citation: 50 Geo. 3. c. clxiii

Dates
- Royal assent: 9 June 1810
Other legislation
Repealed by	Gas Light and Coke Company Act 1868

Status: Repealed

Text of statute as originally enacted

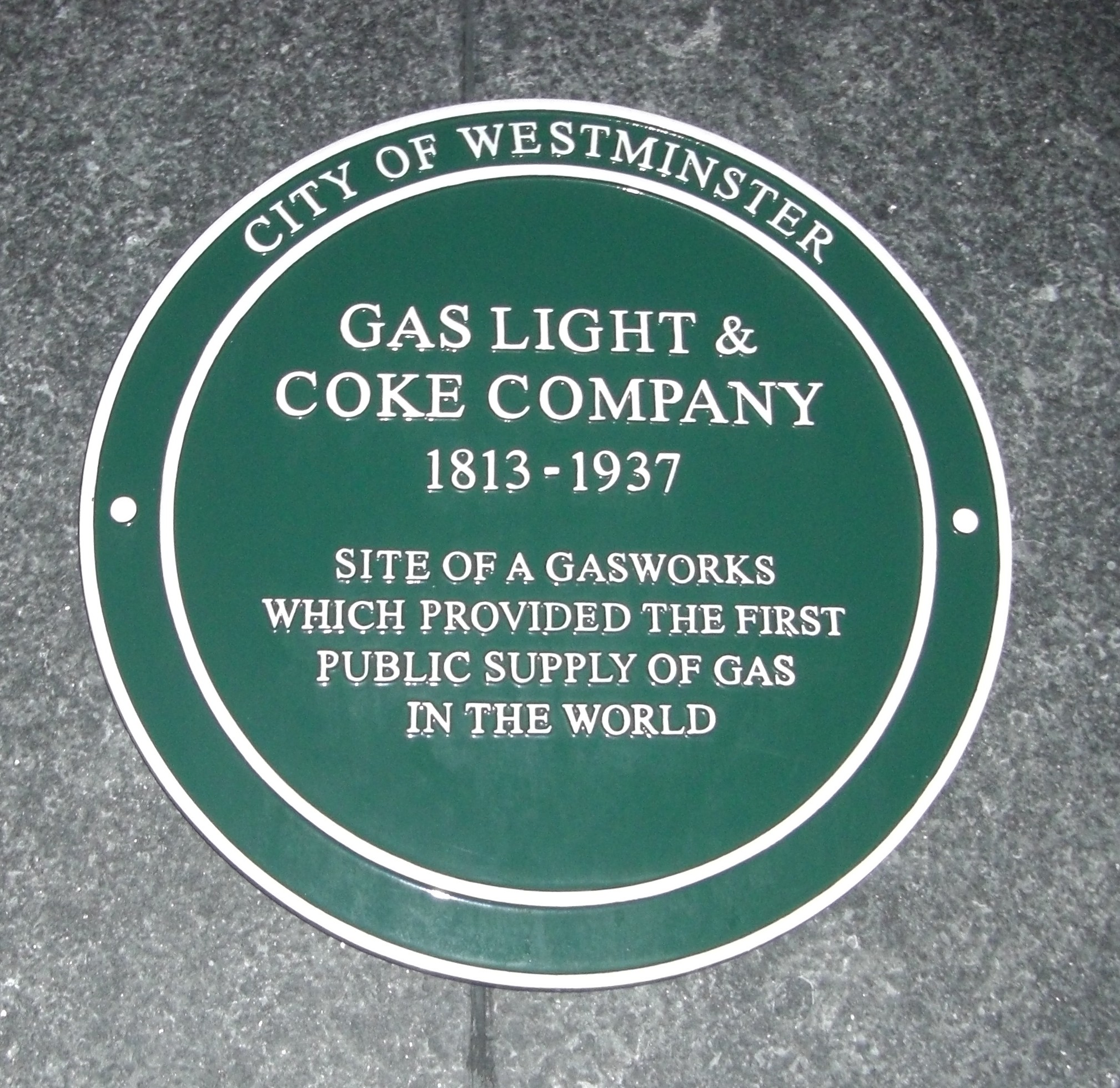
Commemorative plaque in Great Peter Street

The company was founded by Frederick Albert Winsor, who was originally from Germany. Authorisation was given by Parliament in the Gas Light and Coke Company Act 1810 (50 Geo. 3. c. clxiii), and the company was incorporated by royal charter on 30 April 1812 under the seal of King George III. It was the first company set up to supply London with (coal) gas, and operated the first gas works in the United Kingdom which was also the world's first public gas works. It was governed by a "Court of Directors", which met for the first time on 24 June 1812. The original capitalisation was £1 million (about £70 million at 2018 prices), in 80,000 shares.

Offices were established at Pall Mall, with a wharf at Cannon Row. In 1818 the company established a tar works in Poplar and expanded their works at Brick Lane and Westminster. Under the company's chief engineer, Samuel Clegg (formerly of Boulton and Watt), a gas works was installed at the Royal Mint in 1817 and by 1819 nearly 290 miles of pipes had been laid in London, supplying 51,000 burners. Clegg also developed a practical gas meter.

In 1824, it purchased the Sandford Manor House estate in Fulham and the following year built its first gas holder close by the following year with a second added soon afterwards in what became the Gas Works at Sands Lane, covering twenty-eight acres.

=== Constituent companies ===
The company absorbed numerous smaller companies, including:

- in 1820, the East London Gas Works undertaking in Wellclose Square
- in 1870 by the Gaslight and Coke Company's Act 1872 (35 & 36 Vict. c. xxiii), the City of London Gas Light and Coke Company which had been incorporated by the Metropolis Gas Act 1817 (57 Geo. 3. c. xxiii) and had itself acquired:
  - the Aldgate Gas Light and Coke Company in 1819
- also in 1870 by the Gaslight and Coke Company's Act 1872, the Great Central Gas Consumers' Company, which had been incorporated by the Great Central Gas Consumers Act 1851 (14 & 15 Vict. c. lxix)
- in 1871 by the Gas Light and Coke Company's Act 1871 (34 & 35 Vict. c. lxxv), the Equitable Gas Light Company, which had been incorporated by the Westminster Gas Act 1842 (5 & 6 Vict. c. xxxvi)
- in 1871 by the Gaslight and Coke Company's Act 1870 (33 & 34 Vict. c. cxxi), the Victoria Docks Gas Company, which was incorporated by the Victoria Docks Gas Act 1857 (20 & 21 Vict. c. cxxvii), and had itself acquired:
  - in 1858 by the Victoria Docks Gas Act 1857, the North Woolwich Gasworks undertaking
- in 1873, the Western Gas Light Company
- in 1876, the Imperial Gas Light and Coke Company, which had been incorporated by the Imperial Gas Light and Coke Company Act 1821 (1 & 2 Geo. 4. c. cxvii) and had itself acquired:
  - Caslon's undertaking off Grey's Inn Road in 1823
  - in 1824, Mackintosh's undertaking
  - in 1825, the Whitechapel Road Gas Light and Coke Company, which had been incorporated by the Whitechapel Road Gas Light Company Act 1821 (1 & 2 Geo. 4. c. lii)
- also in 1876, the Independent Gaslight and Coke Company, which had been incorporated by the Independent Gaslight and Coke Company Act 1829 (10 Geo. 4. c. cxviii)
- in 1877, the Cricklewood undertaking
- in 1883, the London Gas Light Company, which was incorporated by the London Gaslight Company Act 1844 (7 & 8 Vict. c. xcv)
- in 1910 by the Gas Light and Coke Company's Act 1909 (9 Edw. 7. c. lxxxvii), the West Ham Gas Company, which was incorporated by the West Ham Gas Company Act 1856 (19 & 20 Vict. c. lix)
- in 1912 by the Gas Light and Coke Company's Act 1911 (1 & 2 Geo. 5. c. xlvi), the Barking Gas Company, which had been incorporated by the Barking Gas Act 1867 (30 & 31 Vict. c. xviii)
- also in 1912 by the Gas Light and Coke Company's Act 1911, the Chigwell, Loughton and Woodford Gas Company which was incorporated by the Chigwell, Loughton and Woodford Gas Act 1873 (36 & 37 Vict. c. xxi)
- in 1922, the Ilford Gas Company, which had been incorporated by the Ilford Gas Act 1899 (62 & 63 Vict. c. lii)
- in 1926 by the Gas Light and Coke Company's Act 1925 (15 & 16 Geo. 5. c. xxxv), the Brentford Gas Company, which had been incorporated by the Brentford Gas Act 1821 (1 & 2 Geo. 4. c. lxix), which had itself acquired:
  - in 1870, the Norwood (Middlesex) undertaking
  - in 1915 by the Brentford Gas Act 1914 (4 & 5 Geo. 5. c. lxxiii), the Sunbury Gas Consumers' Company and the Staines and Egham District Gas and Coke Company
  - in 1924, the Harrow and Stanmore Gas Company, formed as the Harrow District Gas Company by the Harrow Gas Act 1873 (36 & 37 Vict. c. lxxiv), and which changed its name in 1894 when it acquired:
    - the Great Stanmore Gas Company by the Harrow and Stanmore Gas Act 1894 (57 & 58 Vict. c. ccviii)
  - in 1925, the Richmond Gas Company, incorporated by the Richmond Gas Act 1867 (30 & 31 Vict. c. c)
- in 1930 by the Gas Light and Coke Company's Act 1929 (19 & 20 Geo. 5. c. xlii), the Grays and Tilbury Gas Company, which had been incorporated by the Grays and Tilbury Gas Act 1907 (7 Edw. 7. c. xxxv) and had itself acquired:
  - in 1913 by the Grays and Tilbury Gas Act 1913 (3 & 4 Geo. 5. c. lxxv), the Billericay Gasworks undertaking, the Rayleigh undertaking, the Laindon Gas Company (formed by the Laindon Gas and Water Order 1896) and the Stanford-le-Hope Gas Company (formed by the Stanford-le-Hope Gas Order 1905)
- also in 1930 by the Gas Light and Coke Company's Act 1929, the Pinner Gas Company, incorporated by the Pinner Gas Order 1881
- in 1932 by the Gas Light and Coke Company's Act 1931 (21 & 22 Geo. 5. c. xlviii), the Brentwood Gas Company, which had been incorporated by the Brentwood Gas Act 1905 (5 Edw. 7. c. lix) and had itself acquired:
  - in 1926 by the Brentwood Gas Order 1925 (SR&O 1925/790), the Ingatestone and Fryering Gas Company, which had been founded in 1858
- also in 1932 by the Gas Light and Coke Company's Act 1931, the Southend-on-Sea and District Gas Company, incorporated by the Southend Gas Act 1877 (40 & 41 Vict. c. cliv), which had itself acquired:
  - in 1920, the Rochford undertaking
  - in 1923, the Leigh-on-Sea undertaking

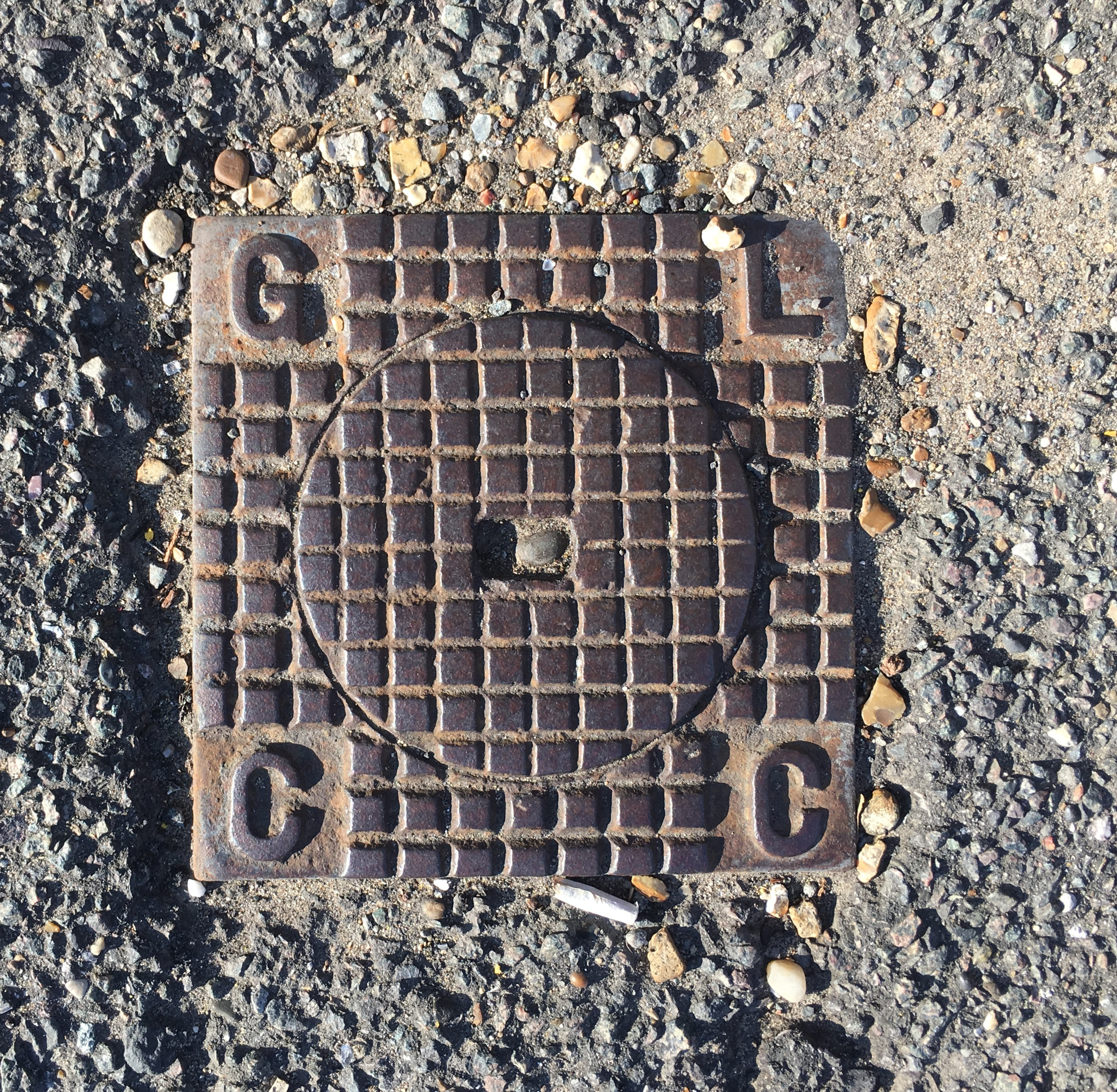
GLCC service valve cover

With the advent of electricity, the company expanded into domestic services, with "lady demonstrators" employed to promote gas cooking. This home service eventually developed into a full advisory service on domestic gas use.

In 1948 the GLCC supplied an area of 547 square miles from Egham in Surrey, Pinner in North West London to Southend-on-Sea in Essex. It supplied a population of 4.5 million, and in 1948 had 21,250 employees and sold 276.7 million Therms (approximately 8 terawatt-hours or 29 petajoules) of gas. On 1 May 1949 the GLCC was nationalised under the Gas Act 1948 and became the major part of the new North Thames Gas Board, one of Britain's twelve regional area gas boards.

The GLCC's service valve covers can still be seen on the streets of London, dating from the period of its operation.

== Gasworks ==
The following thirteen gasworks were in operation when the GLCC was dissolved in 1949.

=== Beckton ===
Beckton Gas Works were built in 1868 on East Ham Levels east of London. The site was named "Beckton" after the GLCC chairman, Simon Adams Beck. The vast 550 acres (220 ha) not only gave the GLCC room for much more gas production than at Nine Elms, but was downriver of the Pool of London and so could be served by significantly larger colliers.

In 1872, five men were gaoled for 12 months following a strike at the Beckton works in support of two workers sacked for requesting a pay rise. The sentence was subsequently reduced to four months. In 1889, men were laid off from Beckton, prompting the founding of the National Union of Gasworkers and General Labourers, which subsequently became part of the General, Municipal, Boilermakers and Allied Trades Union (GMB Union). Engineer to the St Pancras works in 1903, and the Shoreditch works in 1905, and in 1906 he was appointed Resident Engineer of the Beckton works of the Gas Light and Coke Co. The Resident Engineer from 1906 was Joseph Newell Reeson, who went on to undertake world's first experiments with welded gas holder construction.

At the time of nationalisation in 1949, Beckton was the largest gas works in the world, capable of producing a total of 119,120,000 cubic feet (3,373,000 m^{3})of gas per day. The works subsequently closed in 1976.

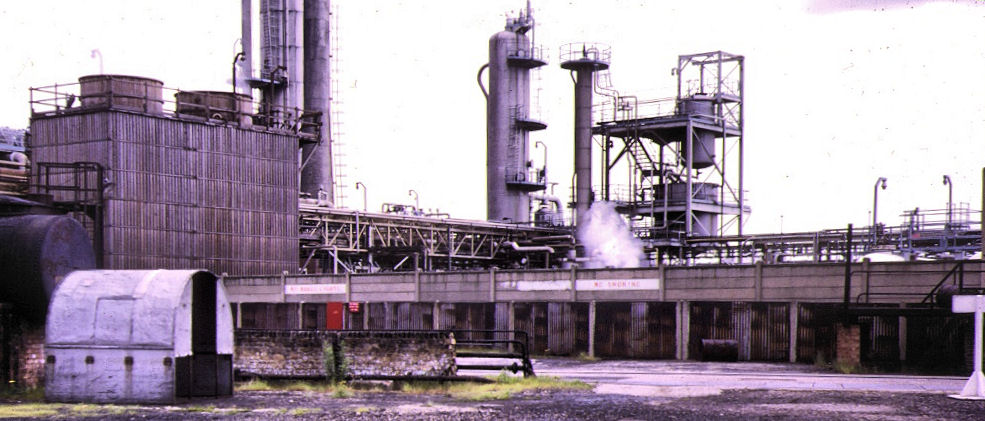
Southall Gas Works in 1973

=== Bow Common ===
Bow Common gasworks was built by the Great Central Gas Consumers' Company in 1850 (Messrs. Peto and Betts had contracted to build the works for £106,000) the works was remote from its supply area in the City and the East End. By the late 1850s, the works had fallen into "ruinous disrepair". The Great Central was absorbed by the GLCC in 1870. The Bow Common works was entirely rebuilt by the GLCC in the early 1930s. Productive capacity was 10,500,000 cubic feet (300,000 m^{3}) per day in 1948.

=== Brentford ===
The Brentford Gas Company was established in 1820. Its gasworks at Brentford was therefore one of the oldest in the country. The company grew to supply Acton, Ealing, Hanwell, Southall, Heston, Twickenham and Barnes. It received legal powers in 1868 to build a new works at Southall on the Grand Union Canal as the Brentford site was said to be too cramped for development. Nevertheless, the Brentford site remained in use and was redesigned and rebuilt in 1935 with Intermittent Vertical Retorts after a study of the Pintsch-Otto plant in Germany; and a polygonal MAN waterless gasometer was built. Productive capacity was 15,500,000 cubic feet (440,000 m^{3}) per day in 1948.

=== Bromley ===
The Imperial Gas Light and Coke Company spent £300,000 on the works on Bow Creek at Bromley-by-Bow which was "obsolescent in design and not yet in sight of completion" in 1875. The company was amalgamated with the GLCC in 1876 but the Bromley works was still considered to be a "vast white elephant" because the coaling arrangements on Bow Creek were unsatisfactory. The plant was reconstructed in the 1890s. Productive capacity was 30,650,000 cubic feet (868,000 m^{3}) per day in 1948. The site subsequently closed in 1976, however the Bromley-by-Bow gasholders remain as they were heritage listed in 1984.

=== Fulham ===
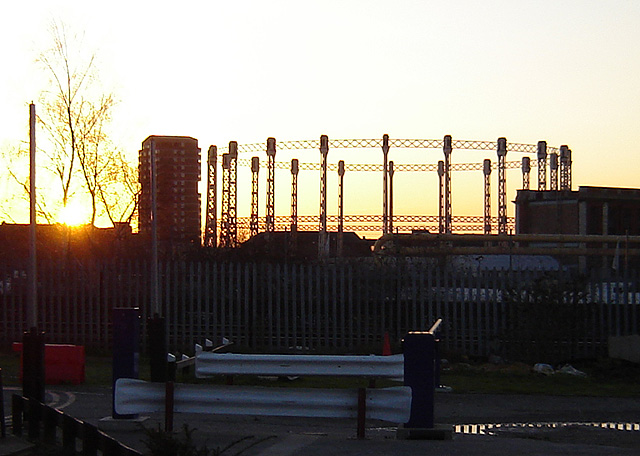
Gasholder of the former Imperial Gasworks, pictured in 2006

The Imperial Gas Company started construction of its works at Sands End in Fulham in 1824. Its ornately decorated number 2 gasholder is Georgian, completed in 1830 and reputed to be the oldest gasholder in the World. The Imperial Gasworks' neoclassical office building was completed in 1857 and a laboratory designed by the architect Sir Walter Tapper was added in 1927. All three structures are now Grade II listed buildings.

Coal was delivered by flatiron coastal colliers, which had a low-profile superstructure, hinged funnel and masts in order to pass under bridges upriver from the Pool of London. The GLCC had a new jetty built at Imperial Wharf in the 1920s. Productive capacity was 32,500,000 cubic feet (920,000 m^{3}) per day in 1948.

=== Harrow and Stanmore ===
The Harrow and Stanmore Gas Company operated the works at Harrow and Stanmore until the company was absorbed by the GLCC in 1924. The Stanmore gas works were located at the north side of the marsh on Marsh Lane. A waterless gasometer was installed in 1931, amidst an outcry about ruining the view from Harrow Hill, including from the headmaster of Harrow School. The holder was painted in undulating lines of green, lighter in tone as they went up the holder. Productive capacity of the works was 3,280,000 cubic feet (93,000 m^{3}) per day in 1948. The gasometer was demolished in 1986.

=== Kensal Green ===
Kensal Green gasworks was built by the Western Gas Light Company soon its incorporation in 1844. It supplied Cannel gas to St Pancras, St Marylebone, Bloomsbury, Hampstead, Paddington and Chelsea. Cannel gas was more expensive to produce but gave a better light than coal gas; however, the works were converted to produce coal gas in 1886. The Western company was absorbed by the GLCC in 1873. In 1889, inclined retorts were installed. The Kensal Green works were entirely rebuilt by the GLCC in the early 1930s. Productive capacity was 16,300,000 cubic feet (460,000 m^{3}) per day in 1948. In 1954, the new No.3 retort house was opened.

=== Nine Elms ===
Nine Elms Gas Works were built in 1858 by the London Gas Light Company, on the site of a former tidal mill on the south bank of the River Thames. The company was taken over by the GLCC in 1883. The works covered 20 acres (8 ha) and once employed 800 people. There was a major explosion at the works on 31 October 1865: the blast killed eleven workers and destroyed the northern gasometer (1,040,000 cubic feet or 29,000 cubic metres). The works were damaged in Second World War air raids.

Coal was delivered by flatiron coastal colliers. After the works were rebuilt, a new jetty and coal handling plant were added in 1952. Productive capacity was 27,700,000 cubic feet (780,000 m^{3}) per day in 1948.

Nine Elms Gas Works closed in 1970 as a result of Britain's conversion to natural gas from the North Sea. The site has since been redeveloped for a Royal Mail depot and other commercial units.

=== Shoreditch ===
The gasworks at Shoreditch was another venture by the Imperial Gas Light and Coke Company, constructed adjacent to the Regents Canal in 1822. By the 1840s, the works supplied gas to Tottenham and Edmonton. Shoreditch gasworks became part of the GLCC in 1876. In 1934, Shoreditch became a stand-by station for "use only in times of exceptional demand". Productive capacity was 5,750,000 cubic feet (163,000 m^{3}) per day in 1948.

=== Southall ===
Southall Gas Works was completed in 1869 for the Brentford Gas Company. The GLCC took the company over in 1926 and had Southall's No. 5 gas holder built early in the 1930s. The holder is over 300 feet (91 m) tall and is still a major local landmark.

Coal was supplied to Southall works via the Grand Union Canal and the Great Western Railway. Like Beckton, Southall was a major supplier of road tar. Productive capacity was 20,250,000 cubic feet (573,000 m^{3}) per day in 1948.

=== Southend-on-Sea ===
The Southend-on-Sea and District Gas Company was established in 1854 and a gasworks was built to the east of the pier. The company absorbed the undertakings at Rochford (1920) and Leigh-on-Sea (1923), and was in turn absorbed by the GLCC in 1932. By this time the plant at Southend was obsolete and the works was entirely rebuilt. Coal was supplied to a dedicated pier. Productive capacity was 7,750,000 cubic feet (219,000 m^{3}) per day in 1948.

=== Staines ===
The Staines gasworks were originally built by the Staines and Egham District Gas and Coke Company on a site adjacent to the River Thames – although coal was delivered by road. The company was absorbed by the Brentford Company in 1915, which was itself absorbed by the GLCC in 1926. Although the works at Staines was considered to be small, it was kept as it was able to meet local requirements at an extremity of the GLCC's grid. A polygonal MAN waterless gasometer was installed in the 1930s. Productive capacity was 1,300,000 cubic feet (37,000 m^{3}) per day in 1948. A continuous catalytic reforming plant was in operation from 1966 to 1971.

=== Stratford ===
The gasworks at Stratford was built by the West Ham Gas Company. It supplied a densely populated area east of London and provided a bulk gas supply to the Chigwell, Loughton and Woodford Gas Company. It was absorbed by the GLCC in 1912. Productive capacity was 9,000,000 cubic feet (250,000 m^{3}) per day in 1948.

=== Closed gasworks ===
The gasworks of the GLCC and its constituent companies that were closed before 1948 (date of closure) were as follows.

- Aldgate (1823)
- Barking (1912)
- Billericay (1913)
- Blackfriars (1873)
- Bow (1825)
- Brentwood (1933)
- Brick Lane (1871)
- Cricklewood (1877)
- Curtain Road (1870)
- Fetter Lane (1814)
- Grays (1931)
- Grays Inn Road Dutton Street (1924)
- Haggerston (1900)
- Ilford (1923)
- Ingatestone (1926)
- Laindon (1913)
- Leigh-on-Sea (1918)
- Limehouse (1824)
- North Woolwich (1864)
- Norwood Middlesex (1870)
- Pancras (1908)
- Pimlico (1901)
- Pinner (1931)
- Rayleigh (1913)
- Richmond (1933)
- Rochford (1920)
- Silvertown (1908)
- Stanford-le-Hope (1913)
- Stanmore (1894)
- Sunbury-on-Thames (1915)
- Vauxhall (1865)
- Vauxhall Gardens (1834)
- Wellclose Square (1820)
- Westminster Cannon Row (1913)
- Westminster Peter Street (1875)
- Whitechapel (1819)
- Woodford (1912)

== Transport ==
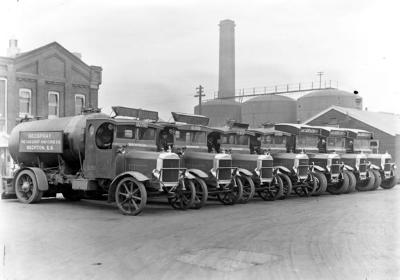
Gas Light & Coke Co. lorries at Beckton, probably in the 1920s

The company had a large and diverse transport fleet including ships, barges and railway wagons and locomotives to bring coal into the gasworks and take coke and by-products out, plus horse-drawn and later motorised transport for local delivery and maintenance.

=== Ships ===
Stephenson Clarke and Associated Companies managed the GLCC's ships.

GLCC ships had brown upper works above hull level. The funnel was black with a broad silver band above two narrow silver or white bands, and the broad silver band was emblazoned with red pyramids. In fact, the narrow 'white bands' should be seen as really the silver background to two black bands representing a fire grate. The inverted triangles represented flames. The house flag was white with a red rising sun in the centre and the initials "G L C Co." in blue capitals distributed around the four corners.

SS Lanterna was a 1,685 GRT collier built in 1882 by the Tyne Iron Shipbuilding Co. of Willington Quay, Howdon, Tyneside. On 6 October 1916 a mine sank her in the North Sea off Cromer. All her crew survived.

SS Coalgas was a 2,257 GRT collier built in 1890 by Short Brothers at Pallion, Sunderland. On 5 March 1918 a mine sank her in the North Sea southeast of Orford Ness. All her crew survived.

SS Ignis was a 2,042 GRT collier built in 1903 by Bonn and Mees of Rotterdam. On 8 December 1915 a mine sank her in the North Sea off Aldeburgh. All her crew survived.

SS Fulgens was a 2,512 GRT collier built in 1912 by Wood, Skinner & Co of Newcastle upon Tyne. On 1 August 1915 the German submarine SM UB-10 torpedoed and sank her in the North Sea one mile off Sea Palling. All her crew survived.

SS Snilesworth was a 2,220 GRT collier that Short Brothers had built in 1889 for John Tulley and Sons of Sunderland. The GLCC bought her in 1915 and renamed her Lampada. On 8 December 1917 the German Type UB III submarine SM UB-75 torpedoed and sank her in the North Sea three miles north of Whitby. Five of Lampada's crew were killed.

SS Grovemont was a 1,298 GRT collier built as Tudhoe in 1906 by S.P. Austin and Son of Sunderland for Furness Withy. J.P. Jönsson of Landskrona, Sweden bought her in 1913 and renamed her Grovemont. The GLCC bought her in 1915 and renamed her Capitol (I). In 1925 the GLCC sold her to new owners in Norway who renamed her Vilma. After the Second World War she passed through three more owners and names. She was broken up in Hamburg in 1957.

SS Grovelea was a 1,282 GRT collier built in 1906 as Lady Furness for A. Christiansen of Copenhagen. J.P. Jönsson bought her in 1912 and renamed her Grovelea. The GLCC bought her in 1915 and renamed her Phare. On 31 October 1917 the German submarine SM UB-17 torpedoed and sank her in the North Sea off Scarborough. 14 of Phare's 18 crew were killed.

SS Universal was a 1,274 GRT collier built in 1878 by Short Brothers for the Taylor and Sanderson Steam Ship Co of Sunderland. The GLCC bought her in 1916 and renamed her Ardens. On 18 August 1917 the German submarine SM UC-16 torpedoed and sank her in the North Sea off Filey. One of Ardens' crew was killed.

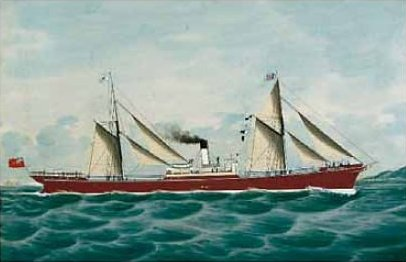
Ritratto della steam ship Magnus Mail in navigazione, painted in 1895 by Antonio Luzzo. She became the GLCC's SS Lanthorn in 1916.

SS Magnus Mail was a 2,299 GRT cargo ship built in 1889 by Short Brothers for J. Westoll of Sunderland. The GLCC bought her in 1916 and renamed her Lanthorn. On 21 May 1917 the German submarine SM UB-41 shelled and boarded her in the North Sea off Whitby. The boarding party tried to scuttle her with explosives but she did not immediately sink. Vessels from Whitby rescued her crew and took Lanthorn in tow, but she sank before she could be beached.

SS Rookwood was a 1,143 GRT collier built in 1896 by John Blumer & Co. of Sunderland for the East London Steam Ship Co of London. The GLCC bought her in 1916 and renamed her Firelight. On 1 May 1917 the German submarine SM UC-29 torpedoed and sank Firelight off the mouth of the River Tyne.

SS Monkwood was a 1,141 GRT collier built in 1900 by John Blumer & Co. for Steam Colliers Ltd. of London. She was sold to Tyne & Wear Shipping in 1901. The GLCC bought her in 1916 and renamed her Glow. On 22 July 1917 the German submarine SM UB-21 torpedoed and sank her in the North Sea off Cloughton. One of Glow's gunners was killed.

SS War Brigade was a 2,365 GRT coaster ordered by the UK War Shipping Controller and built in 1919. While she was under construction the GLCC bought her and renamed her Halo. On 21 March 1941 a mine in the Thames sank her off Beckton Pier. She was later salvaged and returned to service. On 22 January 1945 a German E-boat torpedoed her in the North Sea off Vlissingen. She was taken in tow but sank the next day. All her crew were saved.

SS Whitemantle was a 1,692 GRT collier built in 1920 by Wood, Skinner & Co of Newcastle upon Tyne. On 22 October 1939 she was sunk in the North Sea by a mine off Withernsea.

SS Flashlight was a 934 GRT flatiron launched in May 1920 by S.P. Austin & Son of Sunderland. Enemy aircraft bombed and sank her off The Wash on 7 March 1941.

SS Gaslight was a coastal collier launched in 1920. The GLCC bought her in 1921 to supply Beckton gas works and Regents Canal Dock. She passed to North Thames Gas Board upon nationalisation in 1949.

SS Fireglow (I) was a 1,261 GRT flatiron built in 1925 by S.P. Austin & Son. On 8 December 1941 a German mine in the Hearty Knoll Channel in the North Sea north of Blakeney Point sank her, killing one of her crew.

SS Homefire was a 1,262 GRT flatiron built in 1925 by S.P. Austin & Son.

SS Lady Olga was a 1,266 GRT flatiron built in 1927 by S.P. Austin & Son to serve Fulham Gasworks. She passed to North Thames Gas Board upon nationalisation in 1949 and was broken up at Hoboken, Antwerp in 1958.

MV Barking is a tug built in 1928 by J. Pollock & Sons of Faversham, Kent. Her work was to move lighters on the Thames. She has survived, is preserved in private ownership and has been re-engined as a steam tug.

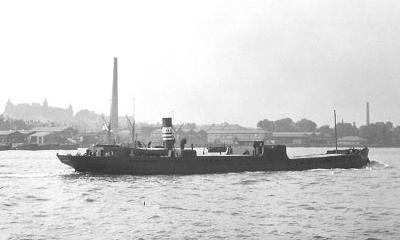
GLCC flatiron SS Suntrap, built 1929, passing Woolwich en route up the Thames in 1931

SS Suntrap was a 939 GRT flatiron built in 1929 by Hawthorn Leslie and Company of Hebburn on Tyneside. On nationalisation in 1949 she passed to North Thames Gas Board, who in 1954 sold her to the Ouse Steam Ship Company, who renamed her Sunfleet.

SS Torchbearer was a 1,267 GRT collier built in 1929 by John Crown & Sons Ltd of Sunderland. On 19 November 1939 she was sunk by a mine in the North Sea off Orford Ness and four of her crew were killed.

SS Horseferry was a 951 GRT collier built in 1930 by John Crown & Sons. On 11 March 1942 the German E-boat S-27 torpedoed and sank her in the North Sea off Winterton-on-Sea. 11 members of her crew were killed.

SS Mr. Therm was a 2,974 GRT collier launched in April 1936 by S.P. Austin & Son. She was named after an advertising image that the illustrator Eric Fraser (1902–83) had designed for the GLCC in 1931.

SS Icemaid was a 1,964 GRT collier launched in May 1936 by S.P. Austin & Son. On nationalisation in 1949 she passed to North Thames Gas Board, who in 1958 sold her to Greek owners who renamed her Papeira M and registered her in Panama. She was wrecked at Mogadishu, Somalia in 1963 and scrapped at Split, Yugoslavia in 1965.

SS Gasfire was a 2,972 GRT collier launched in September 1936 by S.P. Austin & Son. On 17 October 1940 the E-boat S-27 torpedoed her in the North Sea off Smith's Knoll east of Great Yarmouth. Gasfire's stern was damaged and 11 crew were killed but she remained afloat. Austin rebuilt her stern (increasing her GRT to 3,001) and in May 1941 she returned to service, but on 21 June 1941 a mine sank her in the North Sea 11 miles east of Southwold.

SS Murdoch was a 2,717 GRT collier launched in January 1941 by S.P. Austin & Son. On 26 April 1941 she struck a submerged wreck in the North Sea, causing a severe leak. Her crew tried to keep her under way, but she sank near the North Scroby Sand off Caister-on-Sea.

SS Capitol (II) was a 1,558 GRT flatiron launched in April 1941 by S.P. Austin & Son.

SS Adams Beck was a 2,816 GRT collier built in 1941 by the Burntisland Shipbuilding Company of Fife. She was launched in April 1941 and completed in June, but on 29 July enemy aircraft attacked and sank her in the Tyne estuary, killing one member of the crew.

SS Fireside was a 2,717 GRT collier launched in March 1942 by S.P. Austin & Son.

SS Flamma was a 2,727 GRT collier launched at Burntisland in April 1942. She passed to North Thames Gas Board upon nationalisation in 1949. In 1963 she was sold to new owners who renamed her Sangeorge and registered her in Panama. In 1967 she was broken up in Bremen, Germany.

SS Firedog was a 1,557 GRT flatiron launched for the GLCC in July 1942 by S.P. Austin & Son.

SS Winsor was a 2,831 GRT collier launched at Burntisland in May 1942. She passed to North Thames Gas Board upon nationalisation in 1949. In 1964 she was sold to new owners who renamed her Ypapanti and registered her in Panama. In 1966 she was wrecked in the North Sea off Walton on the Naze.

SS Firelight (II) was a 2,841 GRT collier launched at Burntisland in January 1943 and completed in May. On 4 November 1943 an E-boat torpedoed her in the North Sea off the coast of Norfolk. The torpedo blew off Firelight's bow but she remained afloat and put into Great Yarmouth the next day. Later she was taken to South Shields, fitted with a new bow section and returned to service.

SS Fireglow (II) was a 1,549 GRT flatiron launched in July 1944 by S.P. Austin & Son. She took the name of the earlier Fireglow sunk in 1941.

SS Firebeam was a 1,554 GRT collier launched in 1945 by Hall, Russell & Company of Aberdeen, who built her under contract to Burntisland Shipbuilding.

MV Adams Beck was a 1,773 GRT flatiron launched at Burntisland in 1948. She took the name of the earlier Adams Beck sunk in 1941. She passed to North Thames Gas Board upon nationalisation in 1949. She was sold to Greek owners in 1963 who renamed her Razani and registered her in Panama. In 1967 she ran aground in Galway Bay in Ireland. In 1968 she was refloated, taken to Passage West near Cork and broken up.

== Sources and further reading ==
- Everard, Stirling (1992) [1949]. The History of the Gas Light and Coke Company 1812–1949. London: Ernest Benn, A & C Black. ISBN 0-7136-3664-5.
- Everard, Stirling (June 1950). "The History of the Gas Light and Coke Company 1812–1949". The Economic Journal. 60 (238): 393–395. doi:10.2307/2227076. JSTOR 2227076.
- Harnack, Edwin P (1938) [1903]. All About Ships & Shipping (7th ed.). London: Faber and Faber. pp. 612–613, plate 43.
- Talbot-Booth, E. C. (1942) [1936]. Ships and the Sea (Seventh ed.). London: Sampson Low, Marston & Co. Ltd. p. 695.
