= Bromley-by-Bow gasholders =

Historic infrastructure in Newham, east London

Coordinates: 51°31′30″N 0°0′12″W

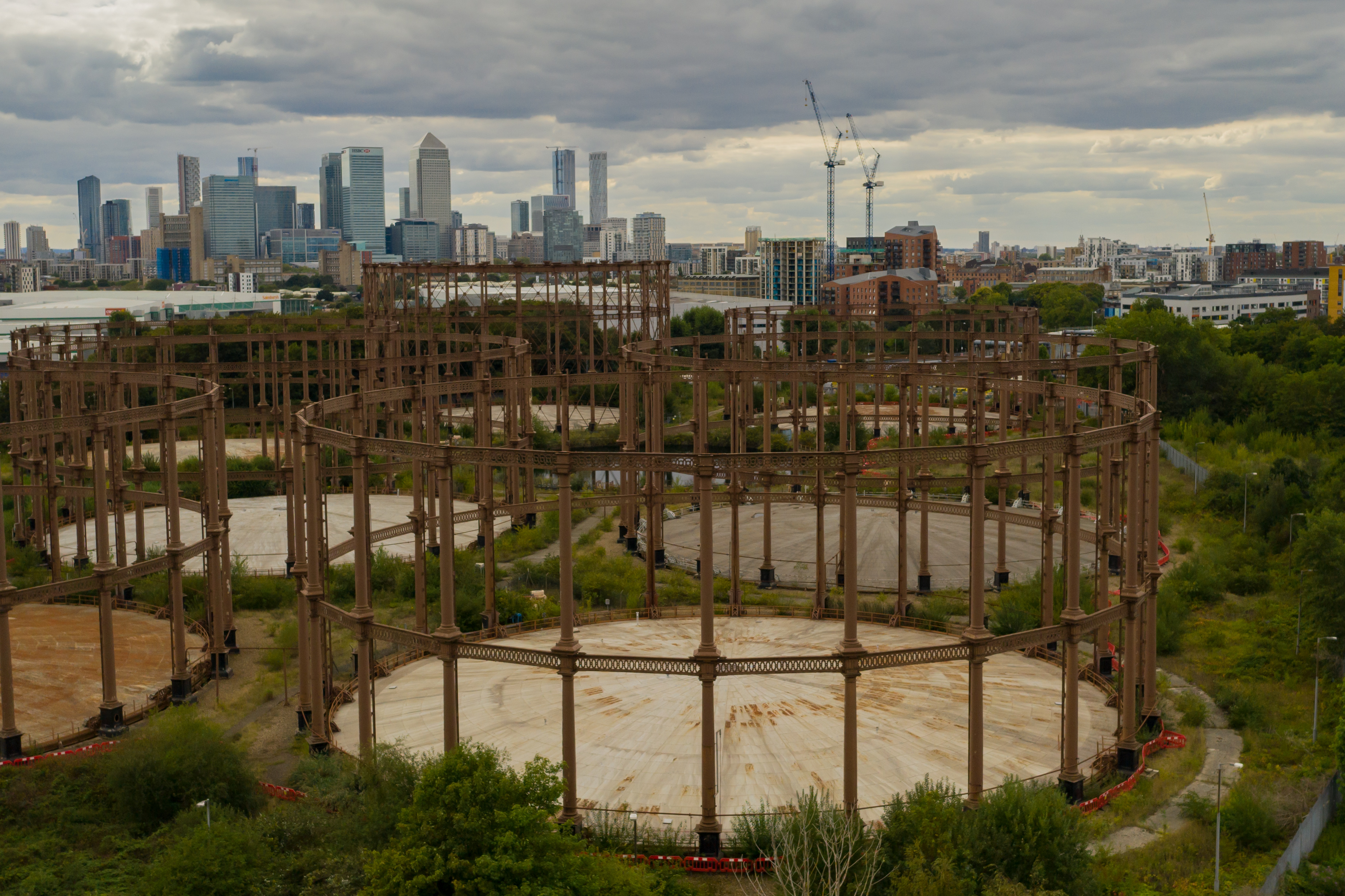
Overhead view of the gasholders in 2020

The Bromley-by-Bow gasholders are a group of seven cast iron Victorian gasholders in Twelvetrees Crescent, West Ham, in the London Borough of Newham. They are named after nearby Bromley-by-Bow in the London Borough of Tower Hamlets.

Built between 1872 and 1878 to store gas from the nearby Bromley gasworks, the site stopped storing gas in 2010, and is currently a brownfield site. They are thought to be the largest group of Victorian gasholders in Britain, with the Victorian Society calling them "a true symbol of the Industrial Revolution".

== History ==
Historically, the site was marshland on the River Lea in the parish of West Ham. In the early 1800s, William Congreve built a factory for his Congreve rockets on a 14-acre site.

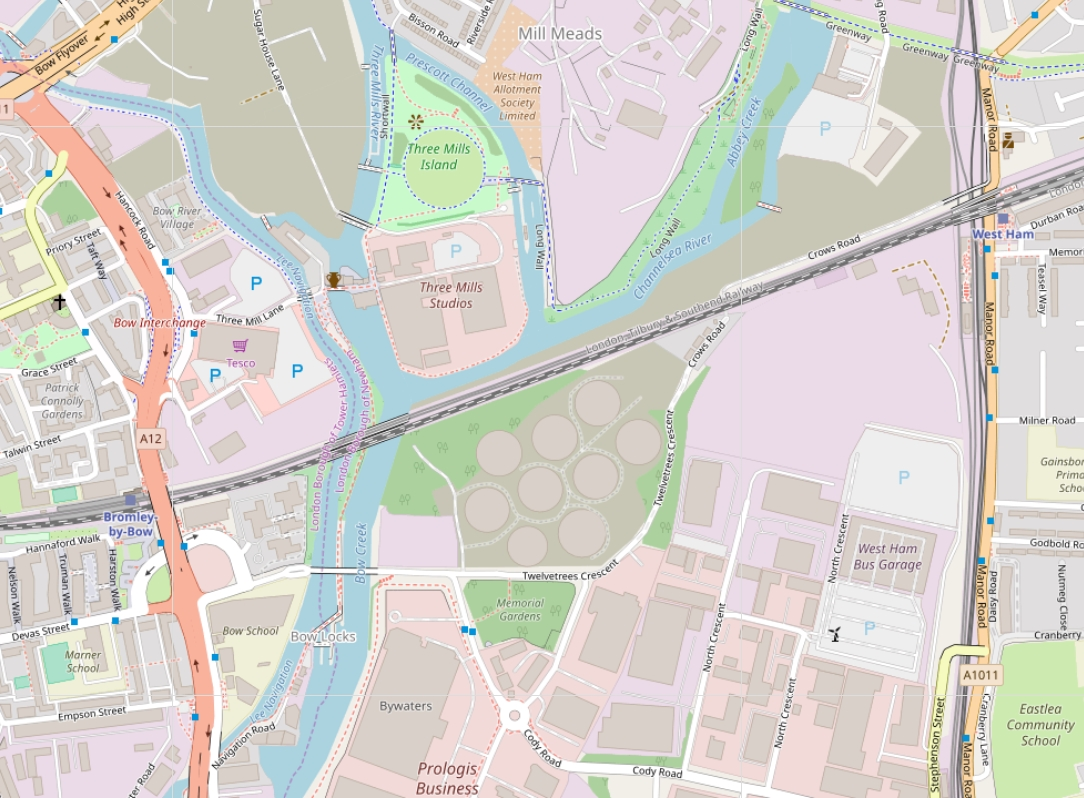
Location of the gasholders

In 1870, the Imperial Gas Light and Coke Company began work to build their largest gasworks at Bow Creek near Bromley, to compete with the Beckton Gas Works of their major competitor, the Gas Light and Coke Company. The works would be around 170 acres in size, replacing the rocket factory. Prior to completion of the Bromley gasworks, the Imperial was absorbed by the Gas Light and Coke Company (GLCC).

To store the gas produced at the gasworks, nine gasholders were built north of the gasworks between 1872 and 1878, designed by engineers Joseph Kirkham, Thomas Clark and Vitruvius Wyatt. Gas was delivered to nearby factories, homes and businesses from 1873, and was originally used for gas lighting. Over time, gas was also used for heating and cooking.

During World War II, the site was bombed in 1940, damaging several of the gasholders. Gasholder number 5 was subsequently removed, and the frame of gasholder number 3 was removed, leaving a circular lake. In 1949, the GLCC was nationalised, with the site falling under the ownership of the North Thames Gas Board.

After the discovery of North Sea natural gas in 1965, gasworks were subsequently closed across the UK – with the Bromley gasworks closing in 1976. The gasholders remained, used to store gas under compression prior to use. The Bromley gasworks located to the south of the gasholders were subsequently redeveloped into an industrial park in the later half of the 20th century.

=== Heritage protection ===
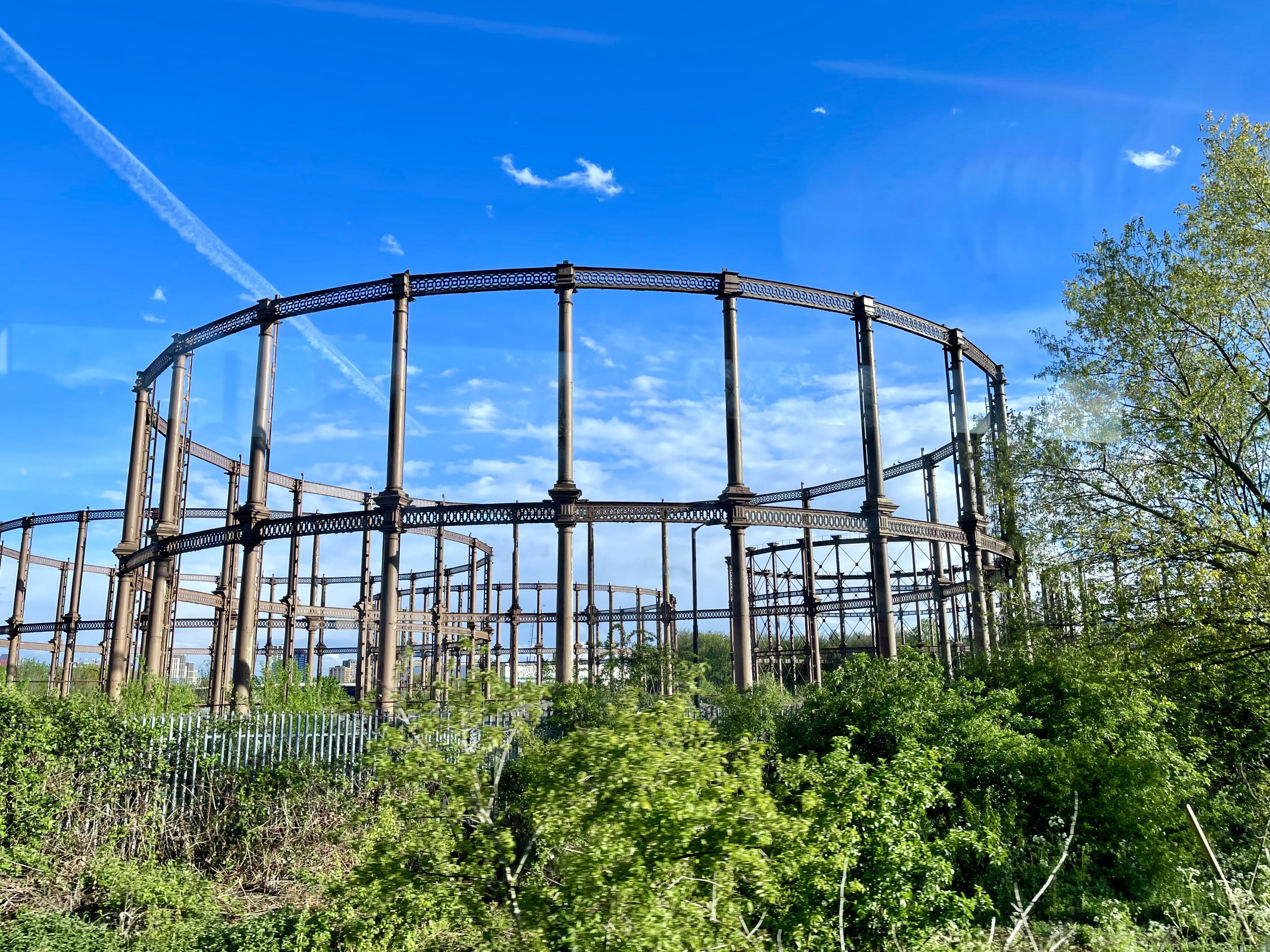
The gasholders as seen from the London, Tilbury and Southend line

In 1984, the gasholders were collectively Grade II listed. This heritage protection was upgraded in 2021, with each gasholder individually listed, as well as the entire group.

Historic England notes that they are "among the most aesthetically distinguished and finely detailed gasholders ever built", with Doric and Corinthian columns, decorative ironwork, and they follow classical architectural rules. They also note that the gasholders are a "unique architectural grouping", as the largest group of Victorian gasholders in the UK.

Nearby to the gasholders, the Twelvetrees Crescent Bridge, the statue of Sir Corbett Woodall (former governor of the GLCC) and the Gas Light and Coke Company war memorials are also listed.

=== Future ===
In 2010, use of the site to store gas ended. The site is now owned by Cadent Gas, who oversee the national gas distribution network in the UK. Various proposals to reuse the site have been suggested, including converting them to an urban park for industrial tourism, or a zoo using the gasholder structures. There is no public access to the site, however the gasholders are visible from nearby Twelvetrees Crescent, Three Mills and from the London, Tilbury and Southend railway line.

In 2018, they were named among the top ten endangered buildings of the Victorian and Edwardian eras in a survey released by the Victorian Society. The Victorian Society has pushed for greater preservation of gasholders, noting that "by their very size and structure, cannot help but become landmarks. [They] are singularly dramatic structures for all their emptiness."

In the early 2020s, Berkeley Homes (under their St William brand, which specialises in regeneration of brownfield sites) proposed redeveloping the site. This has already occurred at other developments in London, such as the Oval Gasholders. In Autumn 2023, a planning application for the site was submitted to Newham Council. St William noted that the cost of restoring the gasholders was around £80 million. In July 2024, Newham Council granted planning permission for 2,200 new homes on the site, with all seven remaining gasholders to be retained. Due to the high cost of restoring the gasholders, only 7.5% of the first phase of homes will be affordable.
