= St Mary's Church, Bromley St Leonard's =

Church in Bromley-by-Bow, England

Coordinates: 51.52840°N 0.01305°W

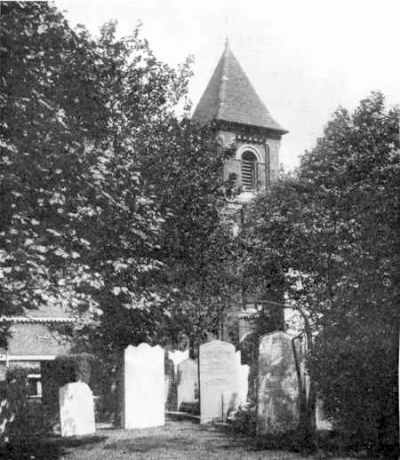
St Mary's Church, Bromley St Leonard's

St Mary's Church, Bow was a Church of England parish church in Bromley St Leonard's, east London. Bromley St Leonard's was split from the parish of Stepney in 1536, reusing the priory church of the recently dissolved St Leonard's Priory, a Benedictine nunnery. The church contained significant monumental sculpture.

The church was destroyed by bombing during World War II and later obliterated by the construction of the Blackwall Tunnel approach road, which divided the main residential area of the parish from the riverside. Its churchyard, however, survives.
