= Frederick Albert Winsor =

German inventor (1763–1830)

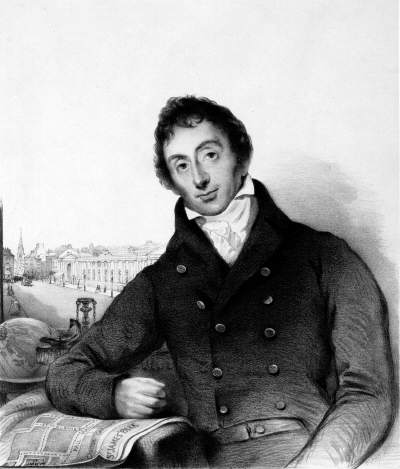
- Born: 1763; Braunschweig, Principality of Brunswick-Wolfenbüttel
- Died: 1830 (aged 66–67)
- Occupation: Inventor

Frederick Albert Winsor, originally Friedrich Albrecht Winzer (1763 in Braunschweig, Principality of Brunswick-Wolfenbüttel – 11 May 1830 in Paris) was a German inventor, one of the pioneers of gas lighting in the UK and France.

Winsor went to Britain before 1799 and became interested in the technology and economics of fuels. In 1802 he went to Paris to investigate the 'thermo-lamp' which French engineer Philippe LeBon had patented in 1799. Returning to Britain, he started a gasworks and in 1807 lit one side of Pall Mall, London, with gas lamps. In 1804–09 Winsor was granted various patents for gas furnaces and, application to Parliament for a charter for the Gas Light and Coke Company having failed, he once more moved to France, but unlike the success he had in United Kingdom in Paris his company in made little progress and was liquidated in 1819. The distilling retort Winsor used consisted of an iron pot with a fitted lid. The lid had a pipe in the centre leading to the conical condensing vessel, which was compartmented inside with perforated divisions to spread the gas to purify it of hydrogen sulphide and ammonia. The device was not very successful, and the gas being burned was impure and emitted a pungent smell. Winsor published Description of the Thermo-lamp Invented by Lebon of Paris in 1802, Analogy between Animal and Vegetable Life, Demonstrating the Beneficial Application of the Patent Light Stoves to all Green and Hot Houses in 1807, and other works.

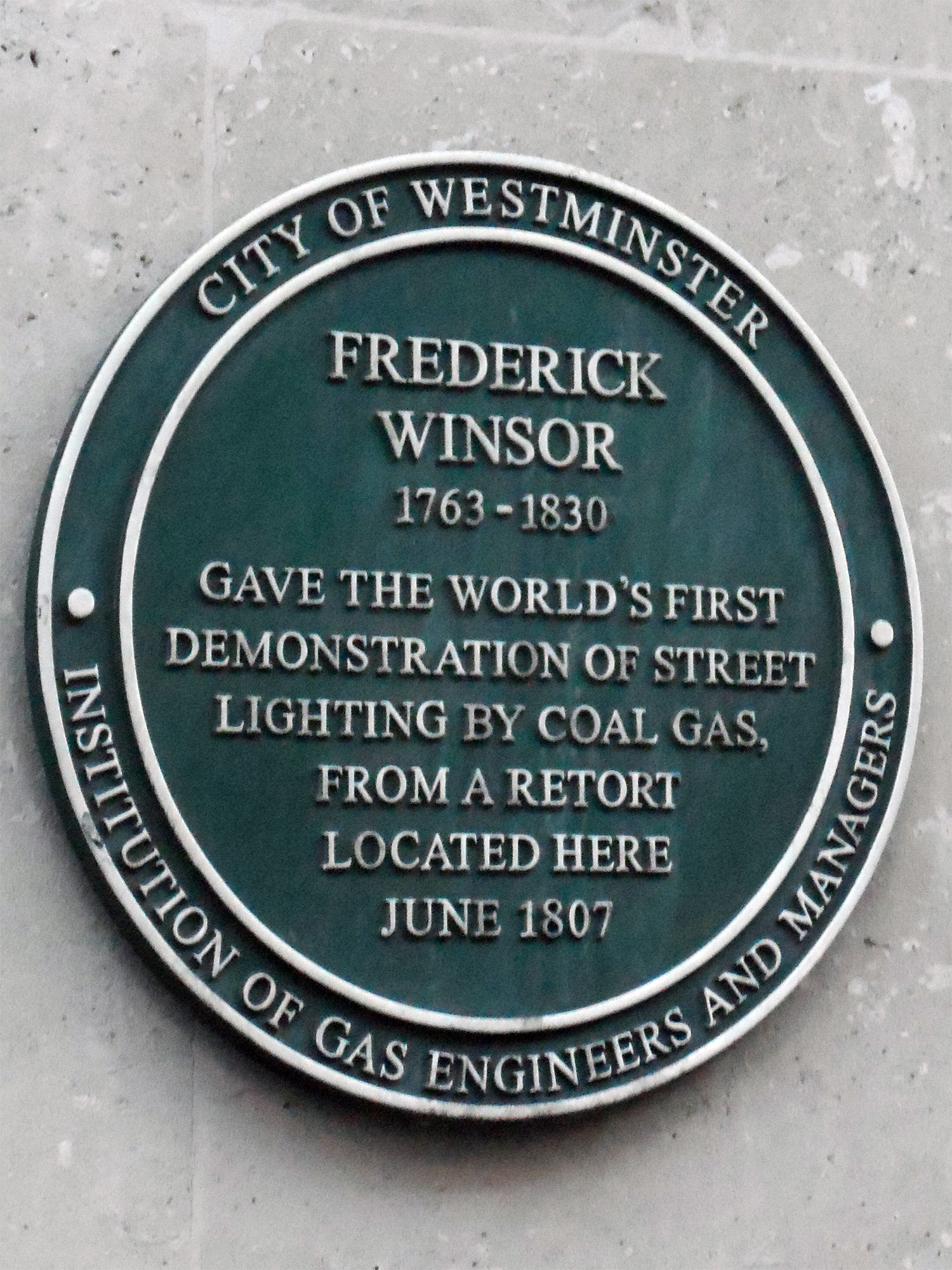
A green plaque honouring Winsor's pioneering demonstration of street gas lighting at 100 Pall Mall, London

He died in Paris and was buried in the Père Lachaise Cemetery. A green plaque on Pall Mall in London marks the site of Winsor's first demonstration, and there is a memorial to him in Kensal Green Cemetery. Winsor Terrace in Beckton, the former approach road to Beckton Gas Works, is named in his honour.
