= SS Lanthorn =

Cargo ship

Coordinates: 54°30′N 00°29′W

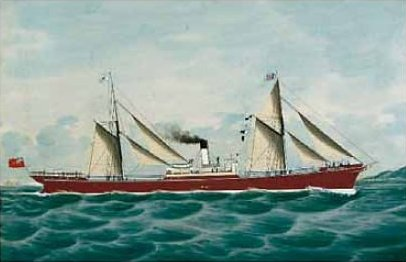
- Ritratto della steam ship Magnus Mail in navigazione, 1895, by Antonio Luzzo

History

United Kingdom
- Name: Magnus Mail (1889–16); Lanthorn (1916–17)
- Namesake: Captain Magnus Mail; "lanthorn", an alternative name for a lantern
- Owner: James Westoll (majority shareholder) (1889–1916); Gas Light and Coke Company (1916–17)
- Operator: Westoll Line (1889–1916); Stephenson Clarke (1916–17)
- Builder: Short Brothers of Sunderland
- Cost: £22,720
- Yard number: 184
- Launched: 1889
- Completed: 1889
- Out of service: 1917
- Identification: Official Number 95287
- Fate: Sunk 21 May 1917

General characteristics
- Type: Cargo ship
- Tonnage: 2,299 GRT
- Length: 290 ft (88.4 m)
- Beam: 39 ft 1 in (11.91 m)
- Height
- Draught: 21 ft 7 in (6.58 m)
- Installed power: 202 NHP three-cylinder triple expansion steam engine
- Propulsion: Single screw
- Sail plan: 2-masted schooner (1895)

SS Lanthorn was a 2,299 GRT cargo ship built in 1889 as SS Magnus Mail, renamed in 1916 and sunk by enemy action in 1917. She was a combined steamship and two-masted sailing ship.

== With Westoll Line 1889–1916 ==
Short Brothers of Sunderland built her in 1889 for the Westoll Line, also of Sunderland. Her triple expansion steam engine and two boilers were built by Thomas Richardson and Son of Hartlepool. She was named after Captain Magnus Mail (1858–1916), a friend of James Westoll.

Magnus Mail was one of the last tramp steamers to be built with a clipper stem. A painting of her from 1895 by the Italian artist Antonio Luzzo (1855–1907) shows her under sail with her two masts under schooner rig. Westoll Line ships exported coal and patent fuel to Italy and Egypt and imported grain from Black Sea ports to the United Kingdom. In February 1908 Magnus Mail ran aground outside Garston Docks in Liverpool.

== With the Gas Light and Coke Company 1916–17 ==
The Gas Light and Coke Company of Westminster bought Magnus Mail in 1916 to carry coal from North East England to Beckton Gas Works. The GLCC renamed her SS Lanthorn and placed her under the management of Stephenson Clarke and Associated Companies.

On 21 May 1917 the German U-boat SM UB-41 shelled her from astern in the North Sea off Whitby. Lanthorn was hit in her saloon amidships, twice in her port quarter and then in her stokehold and engine room, bursting her main steam pipe. All her crew survived the attack, abandoned ship, and rowed away. From their lifeboat they saw the U-boat come alongside her and assumed a German boarding party went aboard Lanthorn. The U-boat then left the area and half an hour later Lanthorn suffered an explosion amidships, which her crew assumed was caused by charges planted by the Germans to scuttle her.

Vessels from Whitby rescued the crew, found Lanthorn still afloat and took her in tow. However, before she could reach safety she sank about half a mile south of the Whitby Rock buoy.
