= North Thames Gas Board =

Former UK state-owed utility

- House flag
- Type: Public utility company
- Industry: Energy (Gas)
- Predecessor: Gas Light and Coke Company plus 11 other gas companies
- Founded: 1 May 1949
- Defunct: 31 December 1972
- Fate: Privatised
- Successor: British Gas Corporation
- Headquarters: 30 Kensington Church Street, London, United Kingdom
- Number of locations: 26 gas works, 2 product works, 87 showrooms, 45 depots, 75 parts stores
- Area served: 1,059 sq mi (2,740 km^{2})
- Key people: see text
- Products: Town gas, coke, pitch, tar, ammonia, coal-tar chemicals, natural gas
- Production output: 772 million therms (UK); 22,600 GWh (1970-1971)
- Brands: North Thames Gas, 'Mr Therm'
- Services: Gas and gas appliance sales
- Revenue: £309 million (1971-1972)
- Number of employees: 25,000 (1950)
- Divisions: 16 districts and divisions

The North Thames Gas Board was an autonomous state-owned utility area gas board providing gas for light and heat to industries, commercial premises and homes in south-east England. The board's area of supply, encompassing 1,059 square miles (2,740 km^{2}), included parts of the County of London, Berkshire, Buckinghamshire, Essex, Hertfordshire, Middlesex and Surrey.

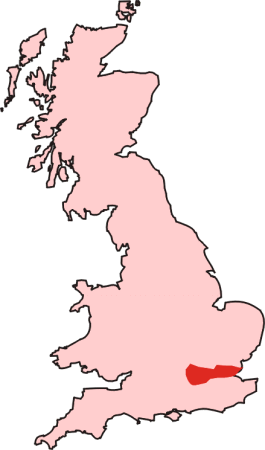
Area of the North Thames Gas Board within Great Britain

== History ==
The North Thames Gas Board was established on 1 May 1949 under the Gas Act 1948 which nationalised the gas industry. The board was responsible to the Minister of Fuel and Power, later the Secretary of State for Trade and Industry, for its operation and finances. The board was dissolved on 31 December 1972 when the North Thames area became a region of the British Gas Corporation under the Gas Act 1972.

Upon nationalisation the board took over twelve local authority and privately owned gas production and supply utilities:

- Ascot District Gas and Electricity Company
- Chertsey Gas Consumers' Company
- Commercial Gas Company
- Gas Light and Coke Company
- Hornsey Gas Company
- Lea Bridge District Gas Company
- North Middlesex Gas Company
- Romford Gas Company
- Slough Gas and Coke Company
- Southend-on-Sea County Borough Corporation
- Uxbridge, Maidenhead, Wycombe and District Gas Company
- Windsor Royal Gaslight Company

Only the gas operations of the Ascot District Gas and Electricity Company were acquired: the electricity undertaking had become part of the Southern Electricity Board in 1948.

These organisations operated 26 gas-making stations ranging in capacity from the large Beckton Gas Works (119.12 million cubic feet or 3.373 million cubic metres of gas per day) to the smallest at Amersham (90,000 cubic feet or 2,500 cubic metres of gas per day). The works had a total annual output capacity of 69.731 billion cubic feet (1.9746 billion cubic metres) of gas. The board inherited a total of 1,746,200 consumers and 8,283 miles (13,330 km) of gas distribution mains.

The board proposed to extend its gas grid to all gas-making stations and to shutdown and decommission the smallest, oldest and most uneconomic stations. The board concentrated production on those sites on the River Thames where coal could be delivered economically by its own fleet of colliers. As well as gas, coke was a significant by-product of the gas-making process and sales of coke accounted for a fifth to a quarter of total revenue. In addition the board sold a range of other gas-making by-products such as tar, pitch, benzole, ammonia and other refined chemicals

Although named North Thames, the gas board supplied gas to several areas south of the river Thames, including the Battersea, Richmond, Morden, Chertsey, Ascot, Bracknell and Maidenhead areas.

The North Thames Gas Board operated staff sports clubs, welfare and other leisure activities for employees, inherited from its predecessor the GLCC. Its sports ground, now derelict, is located on Leigh Road in East Ham, next to the North Circular Road, and is also the location of a (now disused) gasometer. At one time, it also operated a sports ground in Acton.

NTGB initials can still be seen on service covers across London dating from the era of its operation.

== Operations ==
Town gas had traditionally been produced by carbonising (roasting) coal. The majority of gas made by the North Thames Gas Board in 1949 still used this method. In addition water gas was produced by passing steam through white-hot coke. During the 1950s the price of coal, a major feed-stock for gas-making, rose considerably doubling from 64s.3d. (£3.21) per ton in 1950 to 123s.11d. (£6.20) per ton in 1959. The board had to increase its domestic gas price from 1s 4d. per therm in 1951 to 2s 1.85d. per therm in 1957, an increase of 62%. In contrast the domestic price for electricity rose by only 22% in the 1950s and domestic oil prices increased by only 12%. The board found it difficult to further penetrate the domestic and commercial space heating, central heating and other markets. The board instigated new more efficient and cost-effective processes for gas-making including a ‘Gas Integrale’ plant at Kensal Green in 1955, and a plant using low-grade coal at Bromley in 1960. The board also developed process for reforming oil to produce gas including plants at Southall and Romford and butane/air plants at Beckton, Bromley and Fulham. These new processes shifted the production of gas away from coal carbonisation to gas/oil reforming.

North Thames gas producing capacity (million cubic feet per day)
Plant	Year		
Plant	1952	1961	1969
Coal carbonising	237.76	219.75	35.6
Carburetted Water Gas	137.84	162.50	86.0
Reforming	3.00	55.20	816.4
Total	378.60	427.45	938.0

The board was also instrumental in the pioneering import of liquefied natural gas, which was first landed at a pilot plant built by North Thames Gas Board on Canvey Island in February 1959. The scheme was successful in supplying natural gas to other gas boards for use as a reformer feed-stock. The North Thames Gas Board, acting for the Gas Council, then designed and built a full-scale methane terminal on Canvey capable of processing 700,000 tons per year of natural gas from Algeria, commissioned in 1964. The national transportation and distribution pipeline from Canvey formed the backbone of the National Transmission System for transporting North Sea gas after it was first landed in Yorkshire in 1967. The board was also responsible for the 1966 pilot scheme on Canvey to convert all domestic, commercial and industrial to natural gas. The conversion programme was extended across Britain over the period 1967–77.

The technical transformation of gas manufacture and processing resulted in a significant reduction in the number of board employees, from about 25,000 in the 1950s to 8,000 in 1988.

Financial turnover (in £ million) of the board between 1962 and 1971

In 1967 the board experienced the worst deficit in its history (£3.35 million). The war in the Middle East resulted in the closure of the Suez Canal, a 50 per cent increase in oil prices, and stoppage of gas import from Algeria. The board's revenue account was in deficit by £4.3 million and there was a drive to cut costs and improve efficiency. Central heating boilers and space heaters were promoted vigorously, and the arrival of natural gas enabled the board to offer attractive rates to industrial consumers.

The growth in gas consumption and the number of customers over the period 1950-1971 is shown in the following tables.

Growth in gas sales 1950-1971 (million therms)
	1950-51	1959-60	1963-64	1970-71
Domestic	220.2	203.2	257.5	505.6
Industrial	68.1	78.9	76.2	107.0
Commercial	73.2	92.0	107.7	159.3
Total	367.1	376.8	442.5	772.2

Growth in number of domestic customers 1950-71
Year	1950-51	1959-60	1963-64	1970-71
Domestic consumers	1,782,000	1,897,000	1,902,000	1,923,000

In 1972 with the programme of natural gas conversion 58% complete, the board operated only six gas works: Beckton, Bromley, Fulham, Romford, Slough and Southall, and 34 gas holders (gasometers). The total send-out of gas for the year was 1.028 billion therms (UK) (30,100 GWh) and the intake of natural gas was 939 million therms (UK) (27,500 GWh).

== Organisation ==
Upon nationalisation the North Thames Gas Board's area was organised into the following districts and divisions:

- Uxbridge District
- Ascot District
- Windsor District
- Slough District
- Chertsey District
- Western Division
- North Western Division
- North Middlesex District
- Hornsey District
- Central Division
- Northern Division
- Commercial District
- Lea Bridge District
- Eastern Division
- Romford District
- Southend District

The North Thames Gas Board headquarters was located at 30 Kensington Church Street, London from 1949 until 1977. In 1977 the then regional North Thames headquarters was relocated to London Road, Staines-upon-Thames, where the overall control room for the pipe network was located, with sub-control rooms located in Slough and Romford. The nine storey headquarters building, North Thames House, had originally been built for Ready Mixed Concrete for their headquarters but the company had been hit by the recession of the mid-1970s and sold the building. It has since been demolished.

Section 9 of the Gas Act 1948 established consultative councils for each area board. They were charged with considering any matter affecting the supply of gas in the area; and of considering and reporting to the area board any such matter. Each council had between 20 and 30 members. Some members were appointed as representatives of local authorities and some as representatives of commerce, industry, labour and other interests. The North Thames Gas Consultative Council was based at 28 Charing Cross Road. It comprised a chairman, a deputy chairman, a secretary, 16 members representing local authorities, and 11 members representatives of commerce, industry, labour and other interests. The council met six times a year. There were four district committees which met quarterly:

- Berkshire and Buckinghamshire District Committee
- Central and North London District Committee
- East London and Essex District Committee
- West London and Surrey District Committee

== Legislative change ==
The Gas Act 1972 created a single statutory authority the British Gas Corporation from 1 January 1973. The North Thames Gas Board ceased to exist and North Thames became a region of the British Gas Corporation.

The Gas Act 1986 privatised the British gas industry with the assets of the British Gas Corporation transferred to British Gas plc which started trading on 8 December 1986. North Thames Gas was restructured into eleven districts in 1986:

- Slough
- Staines
- Harrow
- Richmond
- West London
- Central
- Mill Hill
- Thames
- Forest
- Brentwood
- Southend

== Key people ==
The chairmen of the North Thames Gas Board/Region were:

Name	Vital dates	Dates in Office
Sir Michael Milne-Watson	1910-99	18 January 1949 – 30 April 1964
Richard Stringer Johnson	1907–81	1 May 1964 – 19 May 1970
George Edward Cooper	1915–2004	20 May 1970 – 31 March 1977
John Gadd	1925–94	1 April 1977 – 31 January 1988
Arthur Allan Dove	1933–2017	1 February 1988 – 1991
