= Gas Stokers' strike =

The Gas Stokers' strike of 1872 was a serious political disturbance in the industrial south-eastern districts of Victorian London involving trade unionists striking to assert their rights. The reaction of the radical Liberal ministry and the court case that preceded it proved a landmark in British industrial relations law. The shifting sands of the constitution and changing rights of workers informed the passage a decade later of Third Reform Act, enfranchising working-men for the first time.

Even the most enlightened Manchester Liberal capitalists were hostile to trade unionists during the downturn of the early 1870s. The cabinet ministers William Harcourt, Forster, Hughes, and A. J. Mundella were major participants in legislation to reform trade unionism laws in 1873. In 1872, Henry James, the employment minister, drafted a new piece of trade union law.

== History ==
In November 1872, the London gas stokers went out on strike at the Chartered Gas Company, which had already summarily dismissed 1400 workers. Five of the ringleaders were brought before the central criminal court and Justice William Brett, known for his conservatism, and harsh attitude towards industrial disputes; but the accused on this occasion were charged with criminal conspiracy in R v. Bunn and Others (1872-3): the five men were John Bunn, George Ray, Edward Jones, Robert Wilson and Thomas Dilley.

There was also disturbances at the Beckton Works of Gas and Coke Company. The Gas Stokers Defence Committee sent a letter of appeal to the Home Secretary. The members of the committee were: H. King, George Potter, M. Sinclair, W. Osborne, Henry Broadhurst, Mr. Bailey, Daniel Guile, George Odger, George Shipton. Henry Broadhurst the secretary was already involved with the Reform League, was a mason and joined the Stonemasons Union. He was later a Liberal MP, and in 1886 became the first working-man to be appointed a minister.

A demonstration in Hyde Park found speakers who denounced that attempt to subversion of the much cherished Trade Union Act 1871, which recognized union combinations as lawful. The speakers condemned common law remedies being used to resolve the dispute.

Men at Cardiff had been condemned by the courts for breaking contracts of employment by striking over the unseaworthiness of vessels in the merchant fleet. Justice Brett recalled that John Wilkes had said that the worse effect to put a man was to hang him. The men They believed in their "rights to protection for the combination of labour" and consequently on appeal wrote directly to Parliamentary Under-secretary at the Home Office, Henry Alfred Austin Bruce.

In the House of Commons, the Attorney-General John Coleridge mocked Harcourt's staidness, but Coleridge concluded by agreeing that the law needed changing, or it would lead to contempt of court. Harcourt's bill was supported by James Rathbone MP and Antonio Mundella MP. The Home Secretary ordered the release of the five prisoners sentenced by Justice Brett after serving four months only of the two years sentence at Maidstone Prison. Three of the ex-convicts were emigrated to Australia. The other two tried in vain to find work.

On 13 November 1873, Prime Minister William Ewart Gladstone wrote to offer Harcourt the post of solicitor general, but on the same day, William Harcourt MP left the government, resigning to take up an offer to become Master of Trinity College, Oxford. That was partly due to the pressure exerted by a journalist pen-named Historicus in The Spectator magazine who was likened to a Liberal Benjamin Disraeli being activist and rightist.

== Significance ==
Sir William Brett's decision has been called one of the most important in the Victorian period. The strike of 1872 forced many union organizers to think more widely: they set up a federated body to represent workers across London, but it would not be until the gas workers strike of 1889 that they would earn the eight-hour day. The gas stokers had a particularly harsh existence. The work was dirty and dangerous. The casualty rate was high amongst workers, with many fatal accidents leading to children without fathers. The judge's handling in the case was questioned. His opinion flanked the Criminal Law Amendment Act and revived the whole examination of trade union right to strike, which raised the safety issues in relation to the general public and the inequality of the master–servant relationship inherent in the act by the same name. The Trades Unions Congress of January 1873 meeting at Leeds vowed to repeal the Act.
