= Southall Gas Works =

Former gas works in London

Coordinates: 51.50548°N 0.39175°W

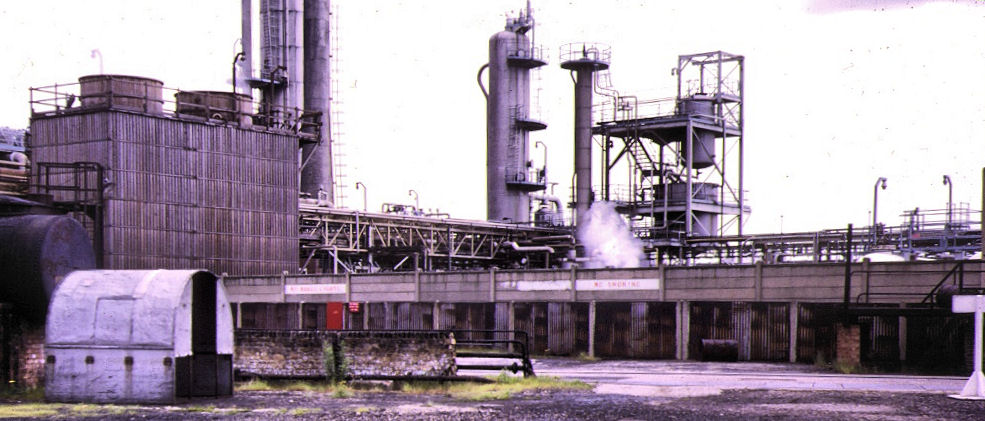
Southall Gas Works in 1973

Southall Gas Works is a former gas works site of around 88 acres (36 ha) in Southall, west London, which is currently being redeveloped for mixed-use including 8,103 homes as part of Berkeley Group's The Green Quarter.

== Location ==
The site is located in Southall, west London, 4 mi (6.4 km) to the east of Heathrow. It lies along the south bank of the Paddington Arm of the Grand Union Canal, close to its junction with the main line of the canal to the Thames at Brentford. It is situated on the north side of the Great Western Main Line and Elizabeth line between Southall and Hayes & Harlington stations, close to the junction with the branch line which originally ran to Brentford Dock. Across the canal is Minet Country Park.

== History ==
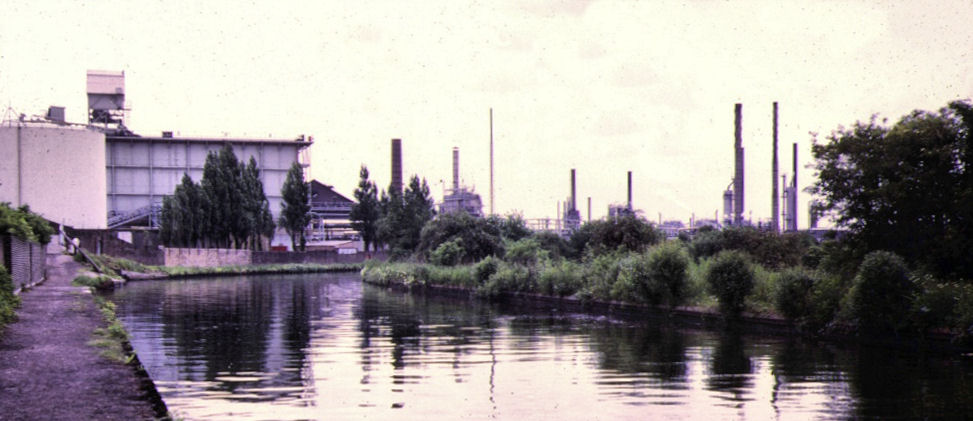
Looking south from the canal towpath to Southall Gas Works, 1973

The gas works was originally constructed by the Brentford Gas Company, opening in 1869. It was required to meet rapidly increasing demand in Middlesex, which outstripped the capacity of the company's original works on the Thames at Brentford.

The gas works was originally established at the western end of the full site, and progressively expanded to the east over sites originally used for brickyards and industrial works. It initially consisted of a retort house and a 480,000 cubic feet (14,000 m^{3}) gas holder. In 1881, a second retort house was built.

In 1878 no. 2 holder was built with a capacity of 1,130,000 cubic feet (32,000 m^{3}). In 1885, a third holder was built with a capacity of 2,100,000 cubic feet (59,000 m^{3}). In 1892, holder no. 4 was erected, to take 3,950,000 cubic feet (112,000 m^{3}) of gas. In 1899, a carburetted water gas (CWG) plant was added with a capacity of 3,000,000 cubic feet (85,000 m^{3}) per day, and in 1903 another retort house with 200 retorts.

During World War I, plants were constructed to produce oil gas tar, coal tar and crude benzole. In 1916 the CWG capacity was increased, and in 1920 Blue Water Gas plant was added.

In 1926, the Brentford Gas Company was taken over by the Gas Light and Coke Company (GLCC). In the early 1930s a 7,500,000 cubic feet (210,000 m^{3}) waterless holder was constructed. This holder, which was over 300 feet high, was removed in 2019.

By 1935, some of the works had closed and had been replaced by a smaller works further east. Whilst not as large as the GLCC's Beckton Products Works, this made a significant contribution to the Company's production, particularly of creosote and road tar. The works was situated on the opposite side of London to Beckton, which facilitated the company's road tar spraying operations on that side of the metropolis. Southall Products Works continued to manufacture ammonium sulphate until 1946.

Following nationalisation of the gas industry in 1949, the plant came under the control of the North Thames Gas Board. Construction of oil gasification plant began and by 1951, up to 300,000 cubic feet (8,500 m^{3}) of gas a day was being produced in this way, primarily at times of peak demand.

In 1953-54, a further 12,000,000 cubic feet (340,000 m^{3}) CWG plant was built on the site of the original retort house from the 1860s, together with tower purifiers.

In the early 1960s, plant was installed at Southall to make town gas from a feedstock of liquefied petroleum gas (LPG) obtained from Fawley refinery via a 70-mile (110 km) pipeline. The first major oil storage tank, of 2,470,000 imperial gallons (11,200,000 L; 2,970,000 US gal), was installed in 1960. In 1963, the catalytic reforming plant had a production capacity of 60,000,000 cubic feet (1,700,000 m^{3}) per day. Catalytic rich gas plant was installed in 1966 with a capacity of 30,000,000 cubic feet (850,000 m^{3}) per day.

The Products Works ceased distilling tar and was closed down in 1968. With the move to North Sea gas the gas works closed in 1973, leaving gas distribution and storage as the main on site functions.[1] The site passed into the hands of British Gas in 1973 and subsequently to National Grid plc.

Parts of the site were used as long-stay parking for Heathrow Airport during the early 21st century, before construction began on The Green Quarter.

== Film set ==
The gasworks was used as a space centre fuelling area for Doctor Who in 1970. The site was used in an episode of The Sweeney in 1975 and in spin-off film Sweeney! in 1977. It was also used in 1978 for the "Fall Girl" episode of The Professionals TV series.

== Redevelopment ==
In 2010, National Grid gained planning permission for a mixed-use development of new homes, leisure, health and education buildings. Initially, this was denied by Ealing Council, however the then mayor of London Boris Johnson called in the plans and overruled the council. In 2014, Berkeley Group entered into an agreement with National Grid to purchase the site, which formed part of the Mayor of London's first "Strategic Housing Zone". In 2016, a Section 73 application to alter the original masterplan permission was approved by the London Borough of Ealing. The site was first named Southall Waterside and the name was subsequently changed to The Green Quarter. The revised masterplan allocated 14 acres (5.6 ha) of the site to landscaped public gardens.

In 2017, Berkeley started remediation works to improve the environmental condition of the land. The remediation work was completed in an 'open-air soil hospital' in September 2019. The first affordable homes were finished in early 2019, with the first private residents arriving in 2021.

In August 2021, the first phase of a new public park at The Green Quarter opened, called Central Gardens. The park has new trees, wildflowers and an amphitheatre, and is used for local community events. When complete, the park will be 4.5 acres (1.8 ha) in size and contain 250 trees as well as a water feature. Central Gardens is one of two new parks at The Green Quarter, with new wetlands also to be created on the site. Berkeley is also building footbridges to connect to the neighbouring 90-acre (36 ha) Minet Country Park.

=== Criticism ===
Some local residents have complained that chemicals are being released from the land leading to health problems. Some experts have claimed that the “substances … present a threat to health” however other agencies such as Public Health England have stated that there is “minimal” risk with a risk assessment stating that the area “remained below levels likely to cause acute or short term health effect.”

Following complaints by nearby residents of strong odours an environmental protection officer was hired by Ealing Council for people to report such complaints.

== See also ==
- Beckton Gas Works
- East Greenwich Gas Works
- Imperial Gas Works, Fulham
- Nine Elms Gas Works
