= St Leonard's Priory, London =

Benedictine nunnery in what is now east London

Coordinates: 51.52840°N 0.01305°W

St Leonard's Priory was a Benedictine nunnery in what is now east London, which gave its name to Bromley St Leonard (today known as Bromley-by-Bow or simply Bromley).

== History ==
=== Middle Ages ===
It was first recorded in 1122 as an institution for nine nuns and a prioress – around the time of its Dissolution the priory's own tradition was that it had been founded by Maurice or Richard de Belmeis I, though the antiquarian John Leland believed it had been a co-foundation by William of London and William Roscelin. It was the burial place of some of the Earls of Hereford and of Essex as well as of a daughter of William, Earl of Henault.

Initially held by Geoffrey, Earl of Essex, the lands on which the priory stood had shifted to the prior and canons of Holy Trinity Priory by 1292. It achieved notoriety in the Geoffrey Chaucer's description of the Nun Prioress in the General Prologue to his Canterbury Tales:

Ther was also a nonne, a prioresse,
That of hir smylyng was ful symple and coy;
Hire gretteste ooth was but by seinte loy;
And she was cleped madame eglentyne.
Ful weel she soong the service dyvyne,
Entuned in hir nose ful semely,
And frenssh she spak ful faire and fetisly,
After the scole of stratford atte bowe,
For frenssh of parys was to hire unknowe.

This was a barbed reference as it implied the Prioress had learned French from the Benedictine nuns in a distinct Anglo-Norman dialect. By this time the dialect had lost prestige and was being ridiculed as sub-standard French.

=== Dissolution and after ===
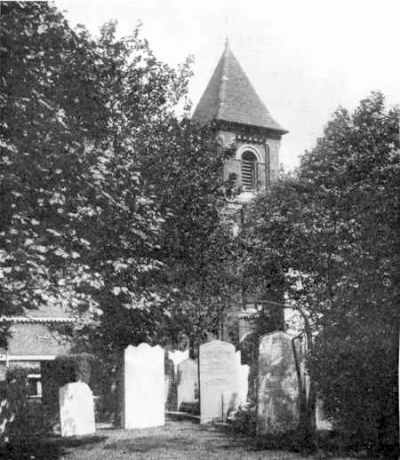
St Mary's Church, Bromley St Leonard's

The priory was destroyed during the first phase of the Dissolution of the Monasteries in 1536, along with many other smaller religious houses. Its books were moved to Westminster Abbey to join the library for the new Diocese of Westminster and the church retained to form a new parish church. Sybil Kirke was the last prioress – she was granted an annual pension of £15 and allowed to retain 35 shillings 2 pence worth of Priory goods. Initially she was also granted the retention of some of the priory's demesne lands to cover her household expenses. She lived until at least 1553.

Most of the rest of the building's contents (such as its cattle and corn) were sold by the king's commissioners to Sir Ralph Sadler, who lived at Sutton House in Homerton and was privy councillor to Henry VIII. Some were also sold to Mr More, steward to the Lord Chancellor. In February 1539 the crown also granted Sadler the priory's site, buildings and most of its lands, including the manor of Bromley, though initially these had all been sold to William Rolte. All that remains of the grounds of the Abbey is the parish church's small neglected churchyard.
