= Bromley-by-Bow =

Coordinates: 51.5246°N 0.0170°W

Bromley
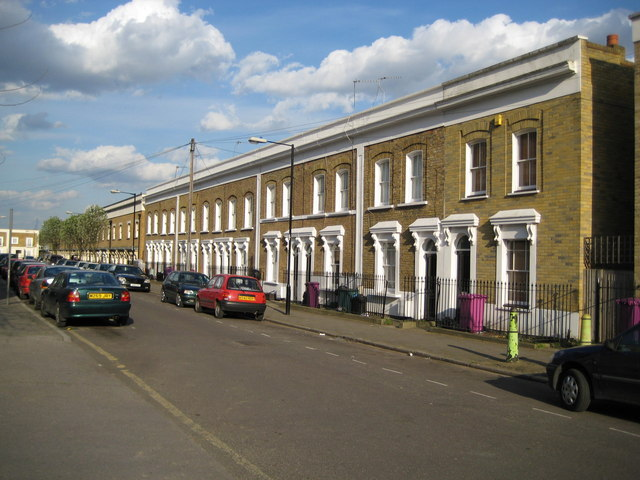
- Arrow Road, a residential street in Bromley-by-Bow

- Location within Greater London
- Population: 14,480 (2011 Census. Bromley Ward)
- OS grid reference: TQ375825
  - Charing Cross: 4.7 mi (7.6 km) W
- London borough: Tower Hamlets
- Ceremonial county: Greater London
- Region: London
- Country: England
- Sovereign state: United Kingdom
- Post town: LONDON
- Postcode district: E3
- Dialling code: 020
- Police: Metropolitan
- Fire: London
- Ambulance: London
- UK Parliament: Poplar and Limehouse; Stratford and Bow
- London Assembly: City and East

Bromley or Bromley-by-Bow is a district in the London Borough of Tower Hamlets in East London, located on the western banks of the River Lea, in the Lower Lea Valley in East London. It is an inner-city suburb located 4.7 miles (7.5 km) east of Charing Cross.

The area is distinct from Bow, which lies immediately north of the formal boundary between the two, which runs along Bow Road, or near the Lea, slightly to the south of the Road. The area has historically been known as both Bromley and Bromley-by-Bow. In 1967, the latter name was chosen as the new name for Bromley tube station, a change designed to prevent confusion with Bromley South station in the London Borough of Bromley.

The formal boundaries of the area were set when the area became a parish in 1537 when it split from Stepney. The boundaries of the new parish were based on those of much older pre-existing estates.

Bromley has a rich history, but many of its most historic buildings have been lost. It is connected to the London Underground and Docklands Light Railway.

== Toponymy ==
In early records the name first appears as Brambele, Brambelegh, or Brembeley and is likely to be derived from the Saxon words Brembel – a bramble, and lege – a field. The name Bromley-by-Bow has historic pedigree, appearing in the correspondence of Oliver Cromwell. In 1967, the name was chosen as the new name for Bromley tube station to prevent confusion with Bromley railway station in the London Borough of Bromley.

Bow itself (also part of Stepney until the 18th century) was originally known as Stratforde, becoming Stratford-at-Bow when a medieval bridge was built, in the arched shape of a bow, to distinguish it from Stratford Langthorne on the other side of the River Lea.

== History ==
=== Pre-conquest to the creation of the Parish ===
The oldest surviving written reference to the area, as Braembeleg, was from about the year 1000 when it was referred to as one of the manors belonging to St Paul's Cathedral.

Bromley was home to St Leonard's Priory, a Benedictine nunnery founded in the time of William the Conqueror and mentioned in the General Prologue to Geoffrey Chaucer's Canterbury Tales. It was destroyed at the time of the Dissolution in 1536, and the manor and lands passed to Sir Ralph Sadleir, who lived at Sutton House in Homerton and was privy councillor to Henry VIII. The exception was the priory chapel which was retained.

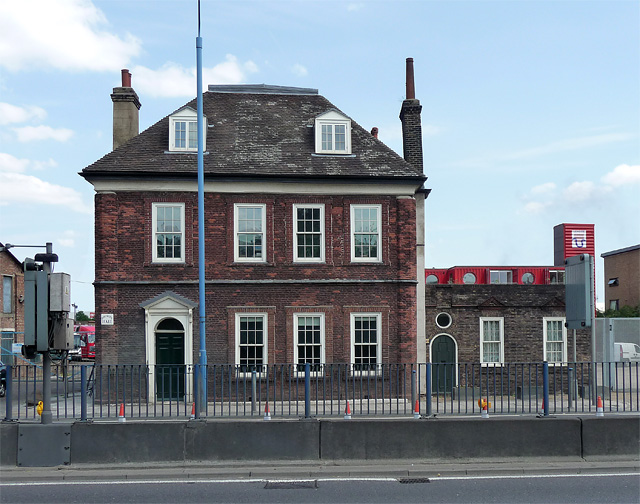
Bromley Hall dates from around 1485 and may be the oldest brick built house in London.

The small Tudor period Bromley Hall was built in the late 15th century as the manor house of Lower Bromley. The house was radically remodelled soon after 1700 and over the following centuries served as a calico printing works, gentleman's seat, gunpowder factory, charity home and a carpet warehouse. It is thought to be the oldest brick house in London.

=== From the creation of the parish (1537) to 1850 ===
The priory chapel was turned into the parish church for a new parish, Bromley St Leonard, which split from the parish of Stepney and covered the area of two much older units, the Manor of Bromley and the estate of the Nunnery of St Leonard.

The area was part of the historic (or ancient) county of Middlesex, but military and most (or all) civil county functions were managed more locally, by the Tower Division (also known as the Tower Hamlets).

The role of the Tower Division ended when Bromley became part of the new County of London in 1889. The County of London was replaced by Greater London in 1965.

In 1606 a palace was built for James I facing the line of St Leonard's Street by John Thorpe. This was principally used as a hunting lodge but was a grand residence of 24 rooms, including a Stateroom, built along the lines of Hardwick Hall and Montacute House. Some of the stonework was quarried from the remains of the (now disused) priory. It remained in Royal use and was refurbished in the reigns of Charles II and James II and stables were added. During the 18th century, the frontage of the building was renewed and the palace was converted into two merchant houses. It went through a variety of uses, including a boarding school and a colour works.

The house was demolished at the end of the 19th century by the London School Board for construction of a new board school. Many of the original fittings remained in place and were said to be in fine condition. The house was sold piecemeal for £250 with the Stateroom, panelling and an oak doorway going to the Victoria and Albert Museum.

Bromley was also known as Bromley-St Leonards, after St Leonard's Priory a Benedictine nunnery founded in the time of William the Conqueror and mentioned in the General Prologue to Geoffrey Chaucer's Canterbury Tales. It was destroyed at the time of the Dissolution in 1536, and the manor and lands passed to Sir Ralph Sadleir, who lived at Sutton House in Homerton and was privy councillor to Henry VIII. The priory chapel was retained and turned into the parish church for a new parish, Bromley St Leonard, split from the parish of Stepney.

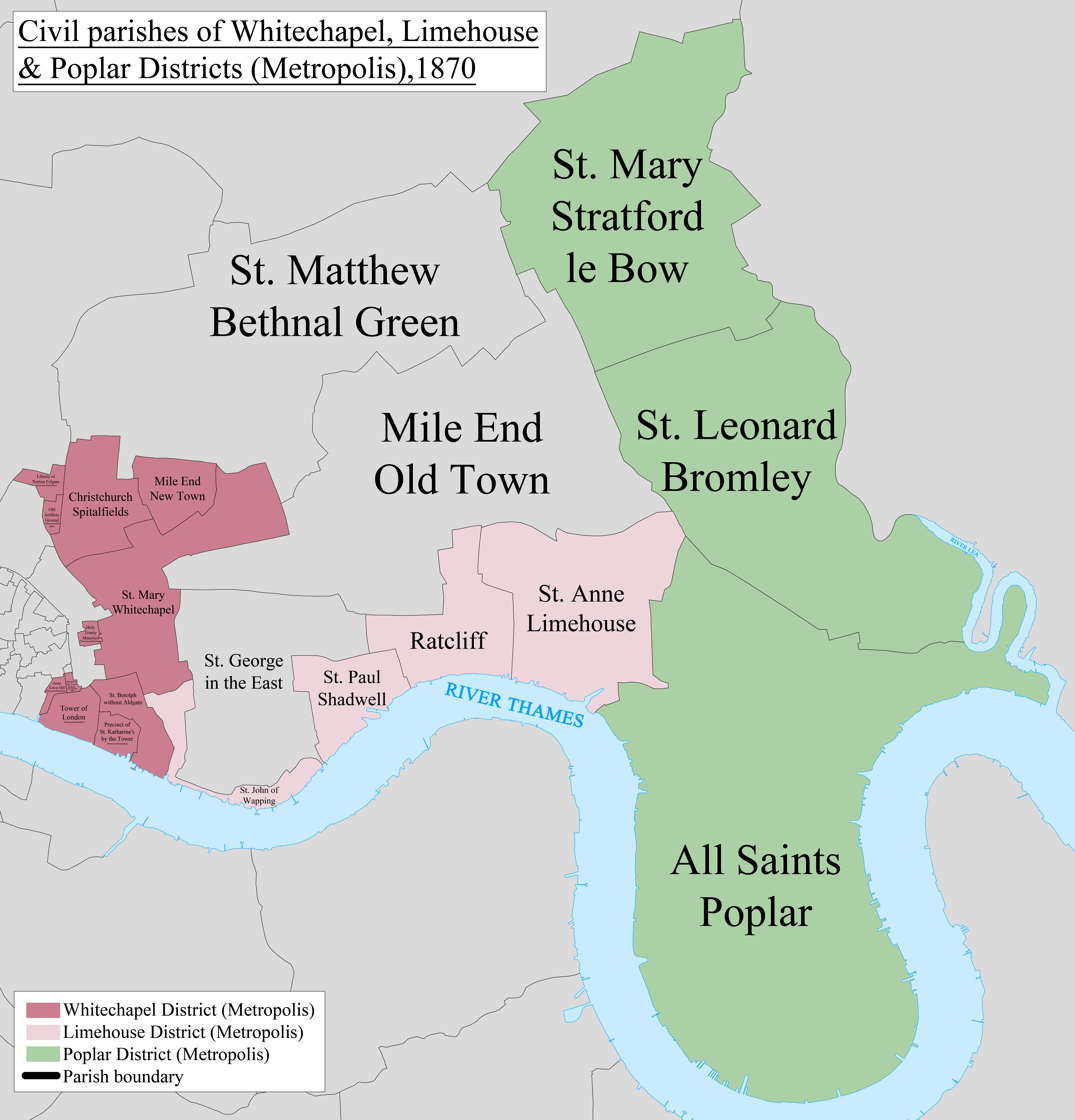
The parishes that would evolve into the modern London Borough of Tower Hamlets

Bromley merged with Poplar and Bow to form the Metropolitan Borough of Poplar. The traditional areas retained their boundaries and identities as the basis of wards.

=== 1850–present ===
In 1868, the Poplar and Stepney Sick Asylum was opened on a site next to the present day Bromley-by-Bow tube station. It was renamed St Andrew's Hospital in 1921. It closed in 2006. A new housing development, William Guy Gardens, now occupies the site. Henry Grattan Guinness founded the East London Missionary Training Institute (also called Harley College) at Harley House in Bromley-by-Bow in 1873, with Dr. Thomas Barnardo as co-director. The school outgrew the premises and relocated in 1883, eventually becoming Cliff College.

The Revd Richard Enraght, religious controversialist, was the Curate of St Michael and All Angels Church in St Leonards Road from 1884 to 1888 and Rector of St Gabriel Church (now demolished), Chrisp Street (Poplar), from 1888 to 1895. Between 1899 and 1965 the parish of Bromley St Leonard formed part of the Metropolitan Borough of Poplar, within the County of London.

On the other side of the River Lea, seven Victorian gasholders are is Grade II listed and have been named by the Victorian Society as a heritage building at risk of disrepair.

=== Gandhi ===
In 1931, Gandhi was in London for talks with the British Imperial government on the future of India-then a part of the British Empire, the only time he left India between 1914 and his death in 1948. He declined the government's offer of accommodation in a West End hotel, preferring to stay in the East End, to live among working-class people, as he did in India.

He based himself at Kingsley Hall in Powis Road, Bromley-by-Bow, for the three-month duration of his stay and was enthusiastically received by East Enders.

=== WWII and Post-war ===
The area suffered heavily in the Blitz and St Leonards Church was destroyed by enemy action in 1941. The area around Aberfeldy Street was heavily bombed and subsequently redeveloped into the Aberfeldy Estate in 1947.

The ruins and much of the churchyard were swept away when the Blackwall Tunnel Approach Road was built through the area in the 1960s.

== Governance ==
The area loosely approximates to three wards in the London Borough of Tower Hamlets. The councillors elected in May 2018 were:

- Bromley North - Zenith Rahman (Labour) and Dan Tomlinson (Labour)
- Bromley South - Danny Hassell (Labour) and Helal Uddin (Labour).
- Lansbury - Rajib Ahmed, Kahar Chowdhury and Bex White (Labour)

On 1 April 1907 the civil parish was abolished to form Poplar Borough. At the 1901 census (the last before the abolition of the parish), Bromley had a population of 68,319.

== Geography ==
=== Extent ===
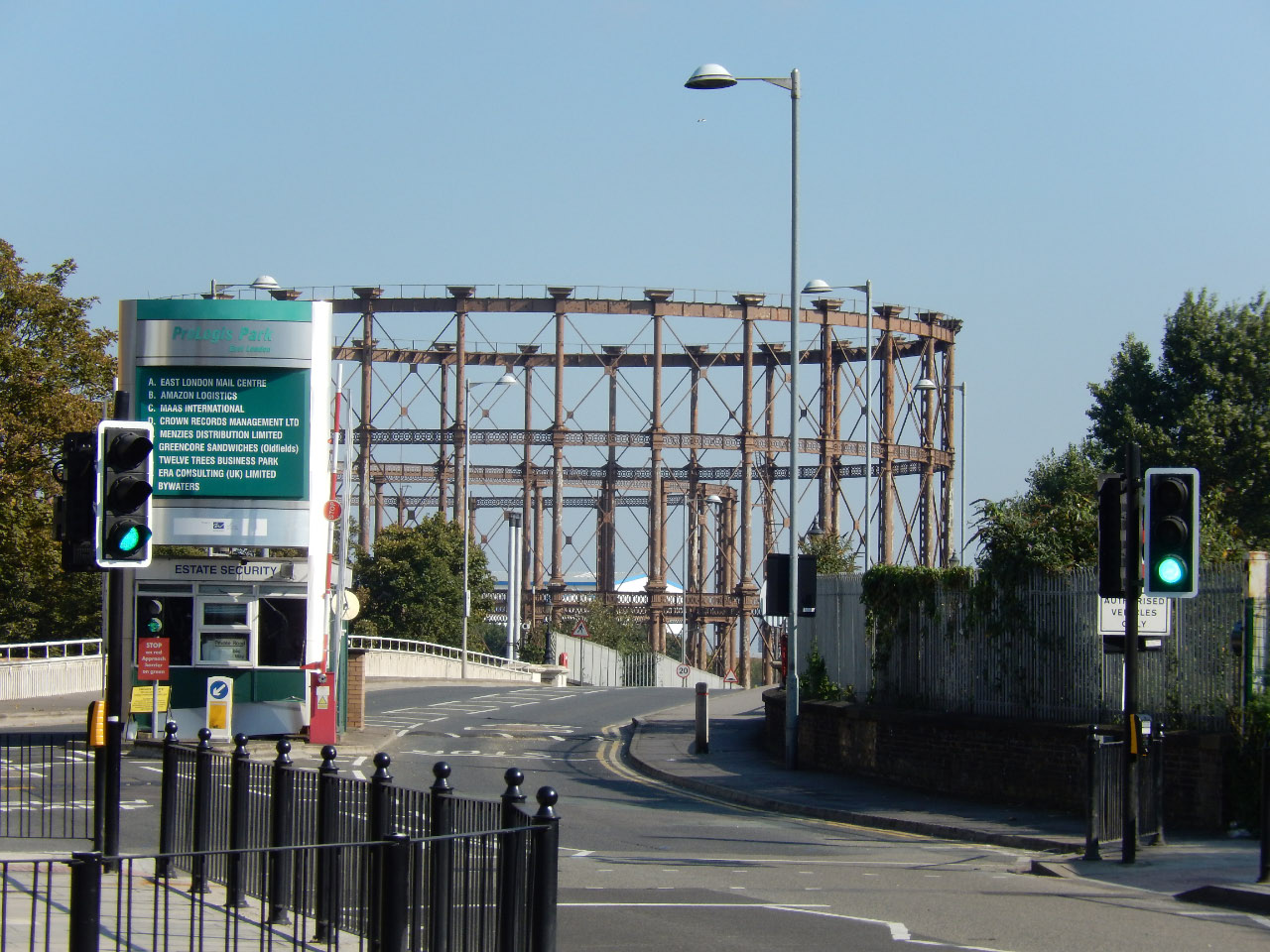
Approaching the Bromley-by-Bow gasholders, viewed from eastern Bromley.

Bromley-by-Bow is a part of the London Borough of Tower Hamlets and takes in parts of the E3 (in the north) and E14 (in the south) postal districts.

To the north is Bow, with the historic boundary running along Bow Road, or near the River Lea, slightly to the south of the Road – with Bow's parish church just south of the road, close to the Lea, a part of Bow. Stratford, West Ham and Canning Town are eastward, across the Lea, which is the boundary between the London Boroughs of Tower Hamlets and Newham. The historic Three Mills and the Bromley-by-Bow gasholders lies just over the border in Newham.

Mile End is located to the west of a historic boundary which runs through Tower Hamlets Cemetery Park and along parts of Bow Common Lane, though the small former open space which was known as Bow Common, on either side of part of that road, lay just on the other side of that boundary, wholly within Mile End. Poplar lies to the south, though the line of the historic boundary from Upper North Street heading south-east to the Lea, by the Leamouth Roundabout, has been blurred by patterns of urbanisation which did not follow the historic estate, parish and (for a time) ward boundaries that defined these areas.

The area is bisected north to south by the Blackwall Tunnel Approach Road (A12). The land between that road and the Lea is undergoing extensive redevelopment.

=== Demographics ===
In 2001, according to the UK national census data, there were 11,581 people living in the ward in 2188 households, giving an average of 2.8 people per household. Of these 51% were female, 30% were under the age of 16 and 40% were of Bangladeshi origin.

Tenure in Bromley-by-Bow ward was predominantly rented with only 15% of households being owner-occupiers. Census data indicates that the proportion of households in rented tenure was higher than the average for the borough. 60% of males were economically active with total unemployment being around 16% compared to 11% for the borough as a whole.

=== Transport ===
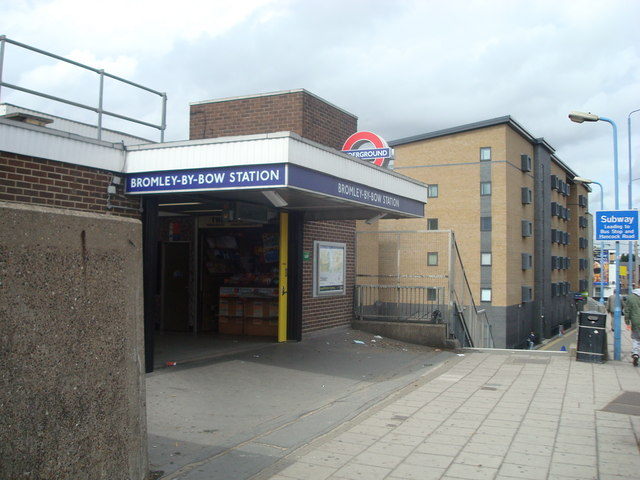
Bromley-by-Bow tube station in 2009.

Bromley-by-Bow station is located in the centre of Bromley and has the London Underground District and Hammersmith & City lines serving it. The Metropolitan line ceased serving Bromley in 1990 British Rail London, Tilbury & Southend Railway services stopped at the station until 1962.

South Bromley railway station on the North London Railway between Bow and Poplar (East India Dock Road) stations opened in 1884, the station lay just to the north of the current Langdon Park DLR station which opened in 2009.

London Buses routes 108, 309, 323, 488 and D8 operate within the area. Route 108 uses the Blackwall Tunnel, a source of severe delays which leads to the route often being cited as amongst the least reliable in London.

The area is connected to the National Road Network by the north–south A12 (East Cross Route), also east-west B140 Devons Road and Devas Street as well as local road Bromley High Street provides further access.

The Lea Valley Walk on the River Lea Navigation and River Lea passes on the area eastern side for pedestrians and cyclists. To the south, the Limehouse Cut starts at the Bow Locks.

== Community ==
Kingsley Hall is famous both for the visits of Mahatma Gandhi to the London in 1931 and the therapeutic clinic run by the alternative psychologist R. D. Laing from 1965. Despite a severe fire in 1995, Kingsley Hall remains an active community centre.

The Bromley-by-Bow Centre is known for it approach to integrated health care, with nursery care, training opportunities and a community centre. It has been cited as a model for the future development of community services and health care.

Bromley By Bow Community Organisation (BBBCO) provides Youth Provisions and Community Engagement programmes for the area. Its projects and services as a voluntary organisation provide the area with five football teams, a Girls Group, Youth Group and Elderly and Community Services.

== Redevelopment ==
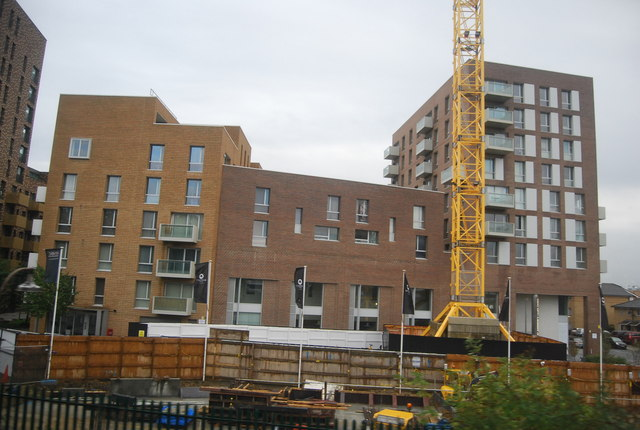
Bromley-by-Bow undergoing regeneration

The Spratt's Complex was redeveloped and split into studio workshops (live/work units) and sold by JJAK (Construction) Ltd for leaseholders to fit out. The first building to be converted was Limehouse Cut, varying in size between 580 to 1,610 sq ft (54 to 150 m^{2}). The building was featured in the Sunday Times in June 1986 and again in 1989.

The London Thames Gateway Development Corporation's aims for the Lower Lea Valley include providing 8,000 new homes and 2,500 new jobs in the Bromley-by-Bow area. The section of land between the River Lea and the A11 is currently being redeveloped. Immediately adjacent to it, in Newham, is the 26 acres (11 ha) Sugar House Island development, led by Vastint.

== Education ==
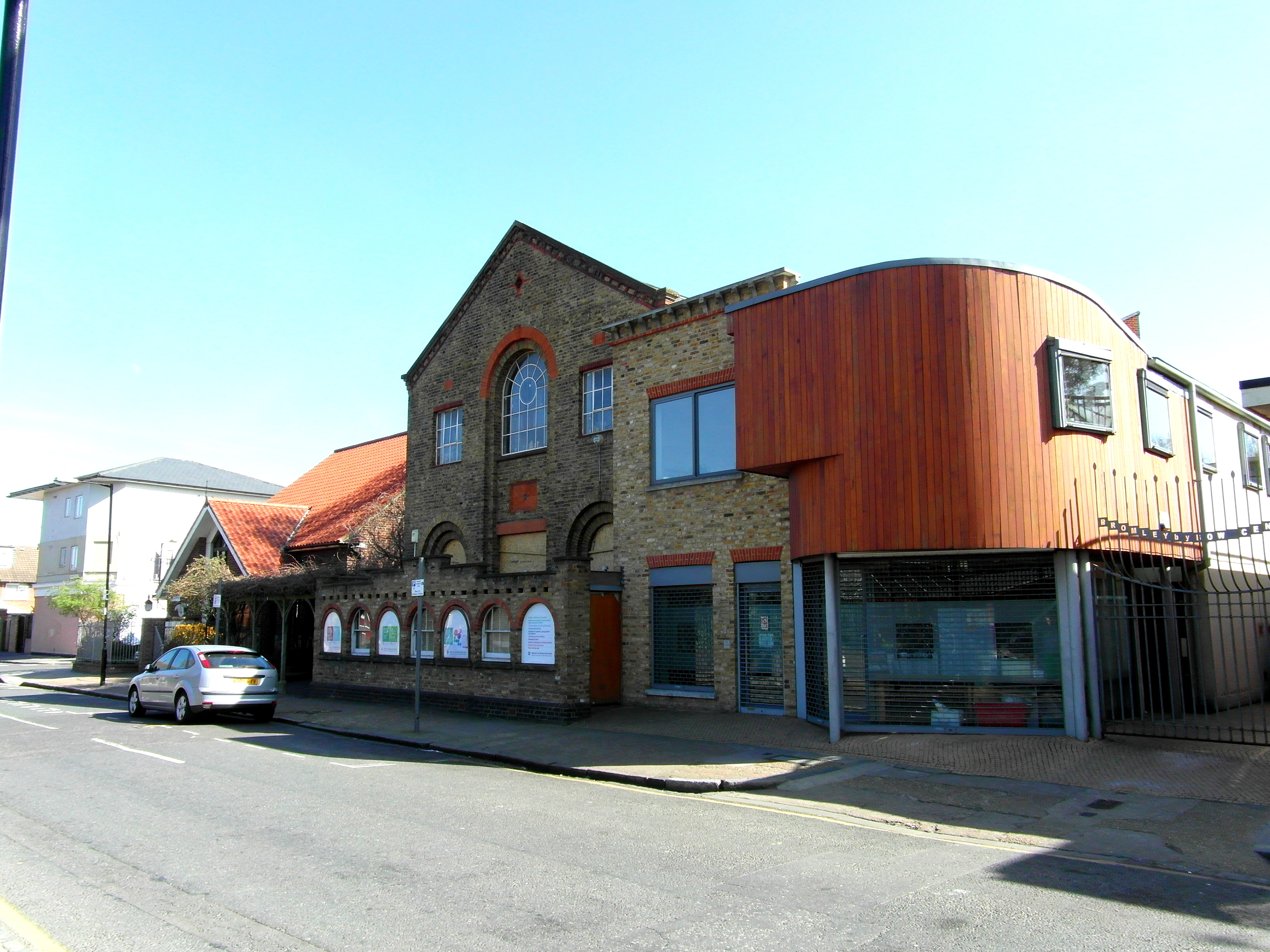
The Bromley by Bow Centre offers adult educational training opportunities

Bow School is a comprehensive secondary school and sixth form for boys and girls. In September 2014 the school moved from the old site off Fairfield Road, in the neighbouring district of Bow to a new site in Bromley-by-Bow 1 mile to the south-east by Bow Locks, in a brand new building designed by van Heyningen and Haward Architects.

Schools which are located near Bromley by Bow are Bow School secondary, Little House Nursery, Wellington Primary, Marner Primary, Old Palace Primary School, St Paul's Way Trust secondary, Phoenix primary and secondary and Central Foundation Girls' School secondary.

Bromley-by-Bow Centre also offers adult training opportunities in the area, such as nursing training or apprenticeships.

== Arts and culture ==
Walford, the area where the BBC soap opera EastEnders is set is based on Bromley-by-Bow. Albert Square, the main community in the show is based on Fassett Square in nearby Hackney.

The CBeebies television series Apple Tree House began filming its episodes on the Devons Estate in 2017.

== Notable residents ==
- John Bastow, cricketer
- William Harold Joseph Childs FRSE, physicist
- William Faulkner, first-class cricketer
- Tommy Flowers, engineer who designed and built Colossus, the world's first programmable computer.
- Andrew Mawson OBE, founder of the Bromley by Bow Centre; entered the House of Lords as Baron Mawson, of Bromley-by-Bow in 2007
- Jack Warner (the Dixon of Dock Green actor) was, as a child, choir soloist at St. Leonard's Church, as were his sisters, the comic entertainers Elsie and Doris Waters
- Mary Price, teacher at Bromley St Leonard's church school; mother of Professor Ralph Kekwick FRS (1908–2000), biochemist who did pioneering work on human blood plasma

== See also ==
- List of people from Tower Hamlets
- List of schools in Tower Hamlets
