= Milne-Watson baronets =

Baronetcy in the Baronetage of the United Kingdom

The Milne-Watson Baronetcy, of Ashley in Longbredy in the County of Dorset, is a title in the Baronetage of the United Kingdom. It was created on 11 June 1937 for David Milne-Watson. He was governor and managing director of the Gas Light & Coke Company and vice-president of the Federation of British Industries. The third Baronet was managing director of the Gas Light & Coke Company and deputy chairman of the British Steel Corporation.

== Milne-Watson baronets, of Ashley (1937) ==
- Sir David Milne-Watson, 1st Baronet (1869–1945)
- Sir David Ronald Milne-Watson, 2nd Baronet (1904–1982)
- Sir Michael Milne-Watson, 3rd Baronet (1910–1999)
- Sir Andrew Michael Milne-Watson, 4th Baronet (1944–2024)
- Sir David Alistair Milne-Watson, 5th Baronet (born 1971)

The heir apparent is the present holder's son Raphael Geraldi Milne-Watson (born 2002).
