= Beckton Gas Works =

Former gas works in London

Coordinates: 51.515876°N 0.071965°E

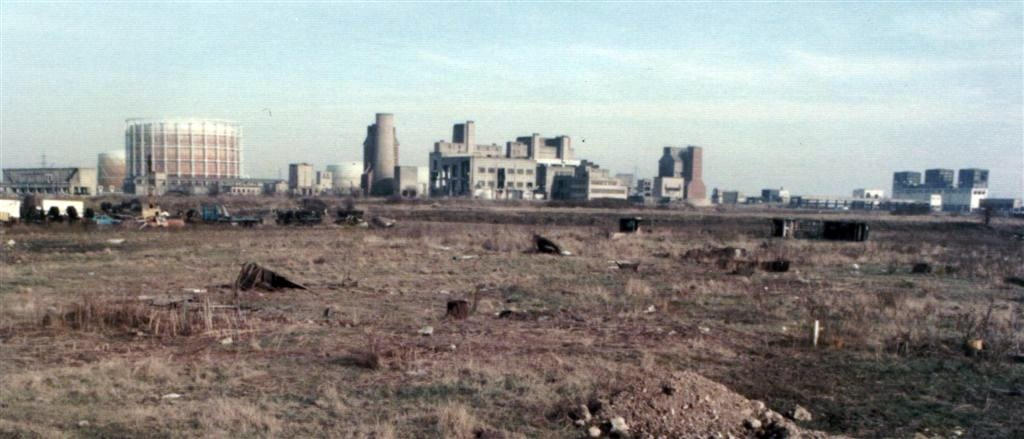
Beckton Gas Works in 1985

Beckton Gas Works was a major London gasworks built to manufacture coal gas and other products including coke from coal. It has been variously described as "the largest such plant in the world" and "the largest gas works in Europe". It operated from 1870 to 1976, with an associated by-products works that operated from 1879 to 1970. The works were located on East Ham Level, on the north bank of the Thames at Gallions Reach, to the west of Barking Creek.

== History ==
The plant was opened in 1870 by the Gas Light and Coke Company (GLCC). The name Beckton was given to the plant and the surrounding area of east London in honour of the company's governor Simon Adams Beck (1803–1883). It came eventually to manufacture gas for most of London north of the Thames, with numerous smaller works being closed. Its counterpart south of the river was the South Metropolitan Gas Co's East Greenwich Gas Works on the Greenwich Peninsula.

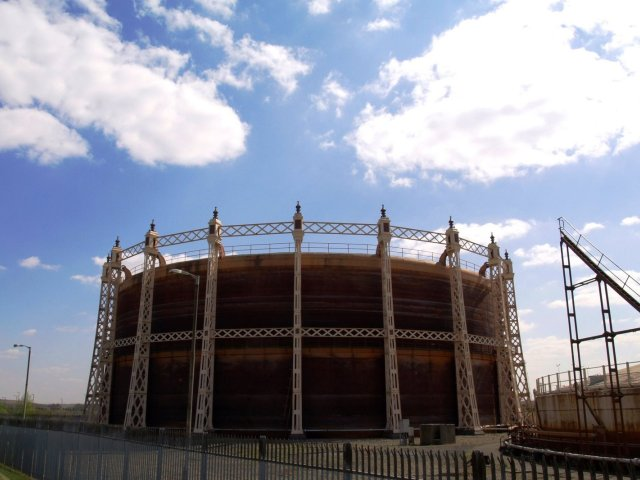
Gasholder at Beckton Gas Works, in 2007

Town gas was produced using coal carbonisation and was conveyed to central London through a 48-inch (1.22 m) diameter gas main to the City of London with an extension to Westminster. The 48-inch main was subsequently duplicated. To augment gas supplies the GLCC built a carburetted water gas (CWG) plant at Beckton in 1890 capable of producing 10 million cubic feet per day (283,166 m^{3}/d). The capacity of the CWG plant had risen to 40 million cubic feet per day (1.133 million m^{3}/d) by 1934. However, the majority of the gas was still produced by coal carbonisation.

After the Second World War a major reconstruction project was undertaken by the civil engineer T. P. O'Sullivan of Brian Colquhoun and Partners. Following nationalisation in 1949 the plant was owned by the North Thames Gas Board.

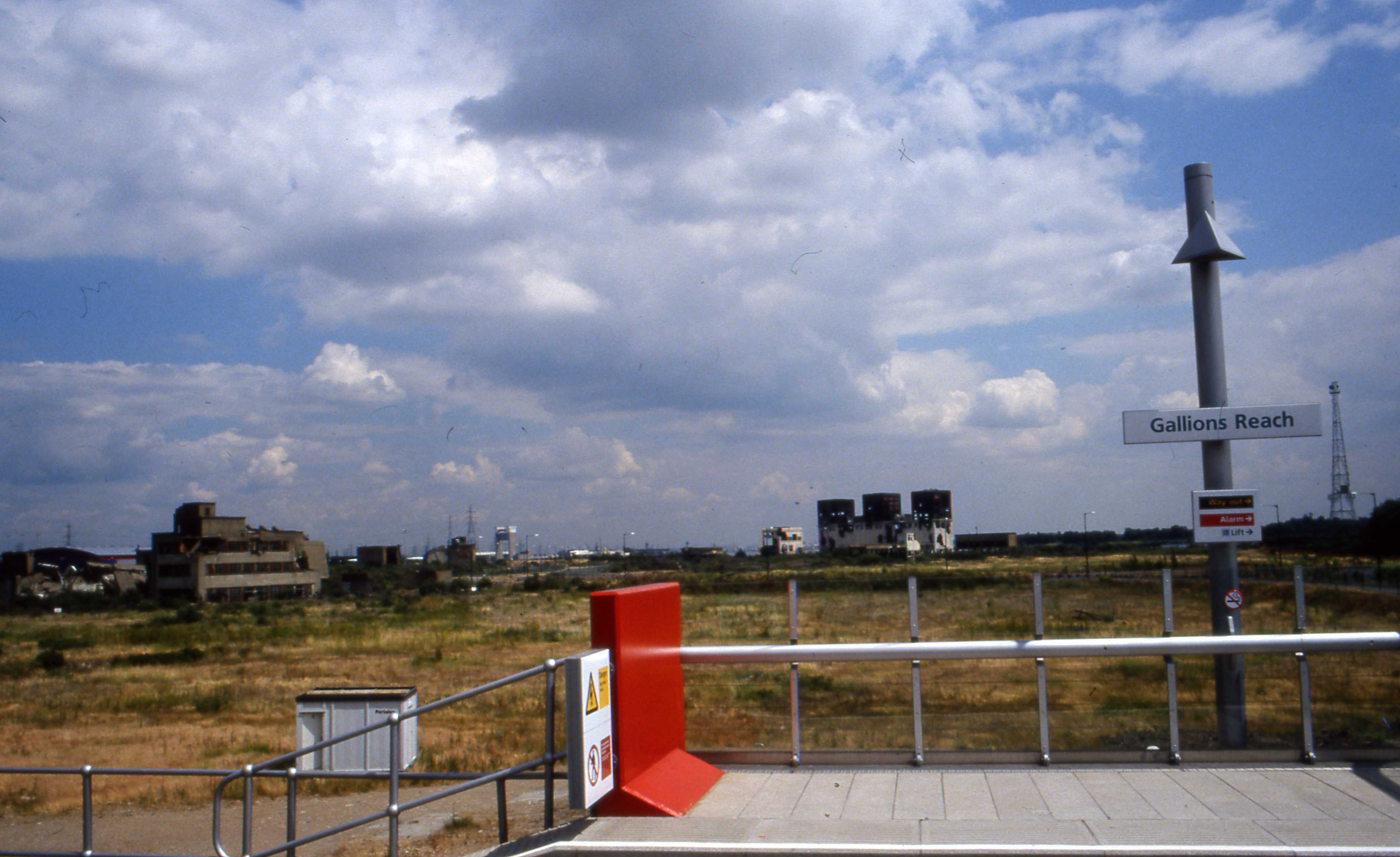
Ruins of the Beckton Gas Works from the Gallions Reach DLR station, 1994

In 1949 Beckton was the largest gas works in the world, capable of producing a total of 119.12 million cubic feet of gas per day (3.37 million m^{3}/day). Over the next 20 years a series of upgrades to the works were undertaken:

- In 1952 a modern carburetted water gas plant was built with a capacity of 20 million cubic feet per day (566,332 m^{3}/day).
- During 1957 a butane/air plant was built at Beckton to augment peak-load gas supplies.
- In 1959 a catalytic reforming plant was commissioned. This used tail gases from the refineries at Coryton and Shell Haven, delivered by pipeline, as a feedstock to manufacture town gas.
- In 1968 another large gas reforming plant was built at Beckton producing 100 million cubic feet of gas per day (2.8 million m^{3}/day). The plant initially operated with liquefied petroleum gases as a feedstock until North Sea gas became available in 1969.

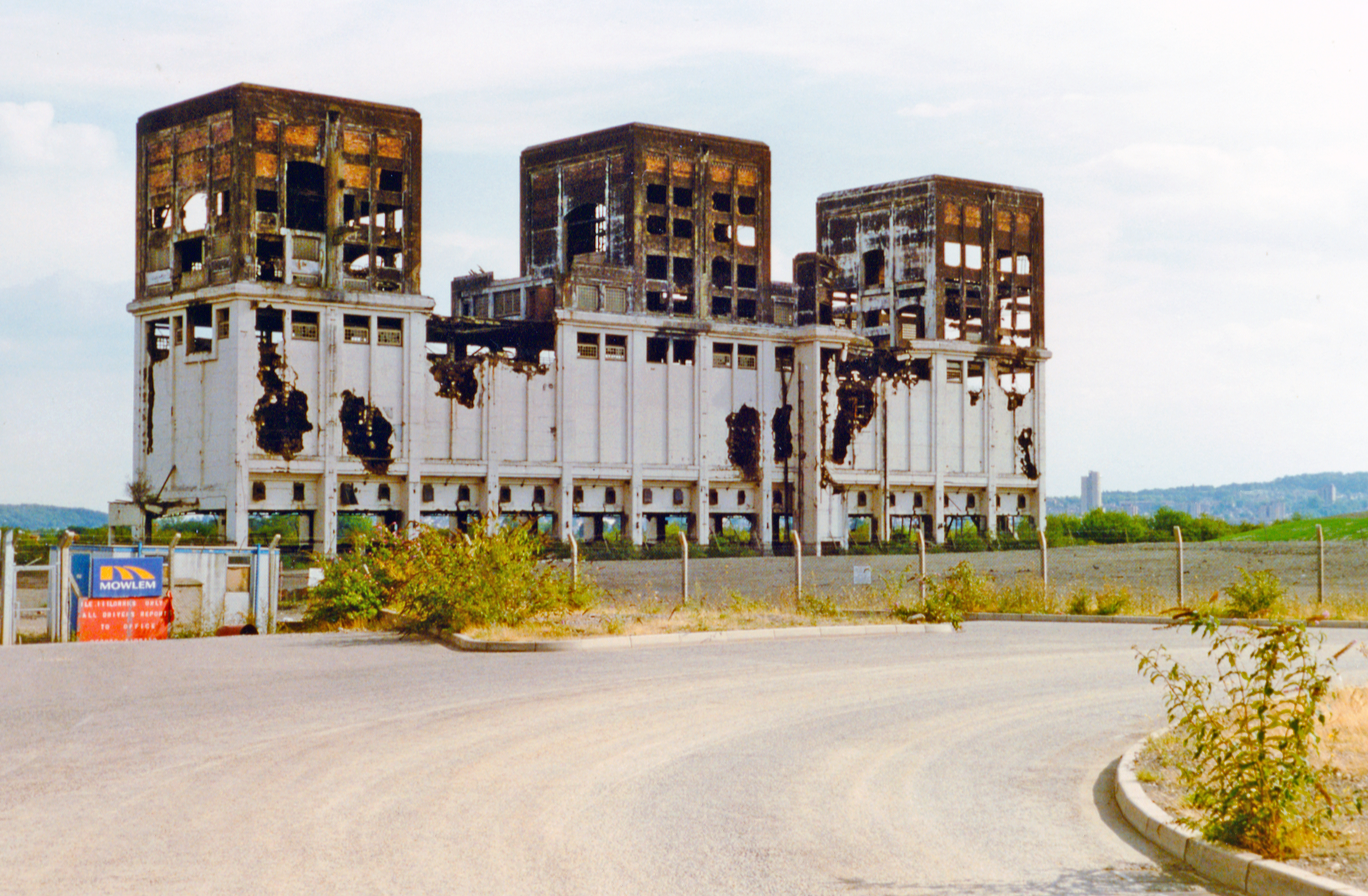
Remains of Beckton Gas Works retort-houses, in 1996

The coal carbonisation plant at Beckton became uncompetitive with North Sea gas and was closed in 1969, which was also when the last trainload left the associated chemical works. Beckton still produced town gas using its reforming plants – with a total gas reforming capacity of 143 million cubic feet gas per day (4.05 million m^{3}/day). The reforming plants operated until 1976; Beckton was the location of the last town gas to natural gas domestic conversions in the North Thames Gas Board supply area on 29 August 1976.

At its peak Beckton had employed 4,500 people, but by the late 1970s only 100 employees remained.

After closure the residual site passed to British Gas and Transco.

The works lay within former Essex docks with parts being redeveloped by the London Docklands Development Corporation.

== Location ==
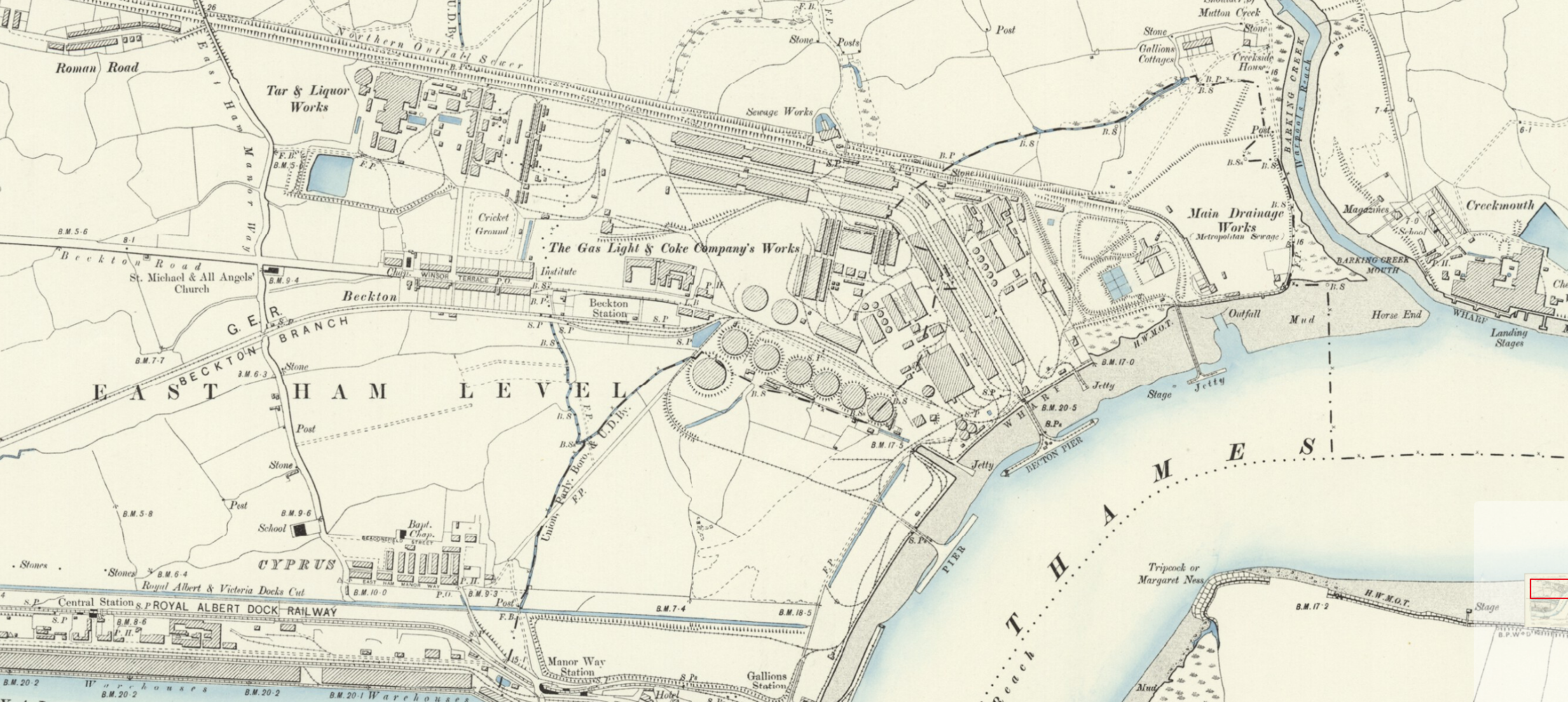
Beckton Gas and Product Works and surrounding area in the 1890s

The works covered a 550-acre (220-hectare) site to the south of the Northern Outfall Sewer, between Woolwich Manor Way and the Thames. The company had considered several sites for the works. The site to the west of Barking Creek was selected as it was possible to build deep water piers in the Thames, enabling direct unloading from steam colliers bringing coal from mines in the North-East of England. There were two piers, for importing coal and exporting by-products. In the 1930s an annual average of a million tons of coal mainly from Durham was unloaded at the main pier, with a further 750,000 tons transhipped to barges for other works. The GLCC had a fleet of seventeen coastal colliers ranging from 1,200 to 2,841 gross register tons, and also chartered larger ships as needed. At this time the plant had a coal storage capacity of 250,000 tons.

== Railway system ==
The plant had an extensive internal railway system of between 42 and 70 miles (68 and 113 kilometres) and featured some unusual elevated sidings that also ran out on a number of piers into the Thames. The Beckton Railway provided a link to the national network at Custom House, used for passenger traffic to the works and for transport of by-products such as coal tar. This was leased and operated by the Great Eastern Railway from 1874. There were no intermediate stations between Custom House station and Beckton railway station, which was at the entrance to the works. The line closed to passengers following bomb damage in 1940, the freight line finally closing in February 1971.

== Beckton Products Works ==
Following the invention of coal gas early in the 19th century, it was discovered that numerous organic and inorganic chemicals could be obtained when purifying the gas. Processes began to be developed to recover these, and a major branch of the British chemical industry – the coal tar and ammonia by-products industry – came into existence. By 1876 a nearby company, Burt, Boulton and Haywood of Silvertown, was distilling each year 12 million imperial gallons (55,000 cubic metres) of coal tar to manufacture ingredients for disinfectants, insecticides and dyes. Sulphur from the gas works was the raw material for local manufacturers of sulphuric acid needed by other nearby companies producing products such as fertilizers. Subsequently, the GLCC decided that it would carry out the processing of by-products itself, rather than sell them to independent chemical companies. A purpose-built chemical works, Beckton Products Works, was constructed in 1879. It was the largest tar and ammonia by-products works in the UK, possibly in the world. Besides millions of gallons of road tar, products included phenol, the cresols and xylenols, naphthalene, pyridine bases, creosote, benzene, toluene, xylene, solvent naphtha, ammonium sulphate and ammonia solution, sulphuric acid, picolines, quinoline, quinaldine, acenaphthene, anthracene and dicyclopentadiene. Since the Products works was dependent on by-products of gas manufacture it could not long survive the introduction of natural gas. The last train carrying chemical products, a load of pitch, left the works on 1 June 1970.

== Beckton Alps ==
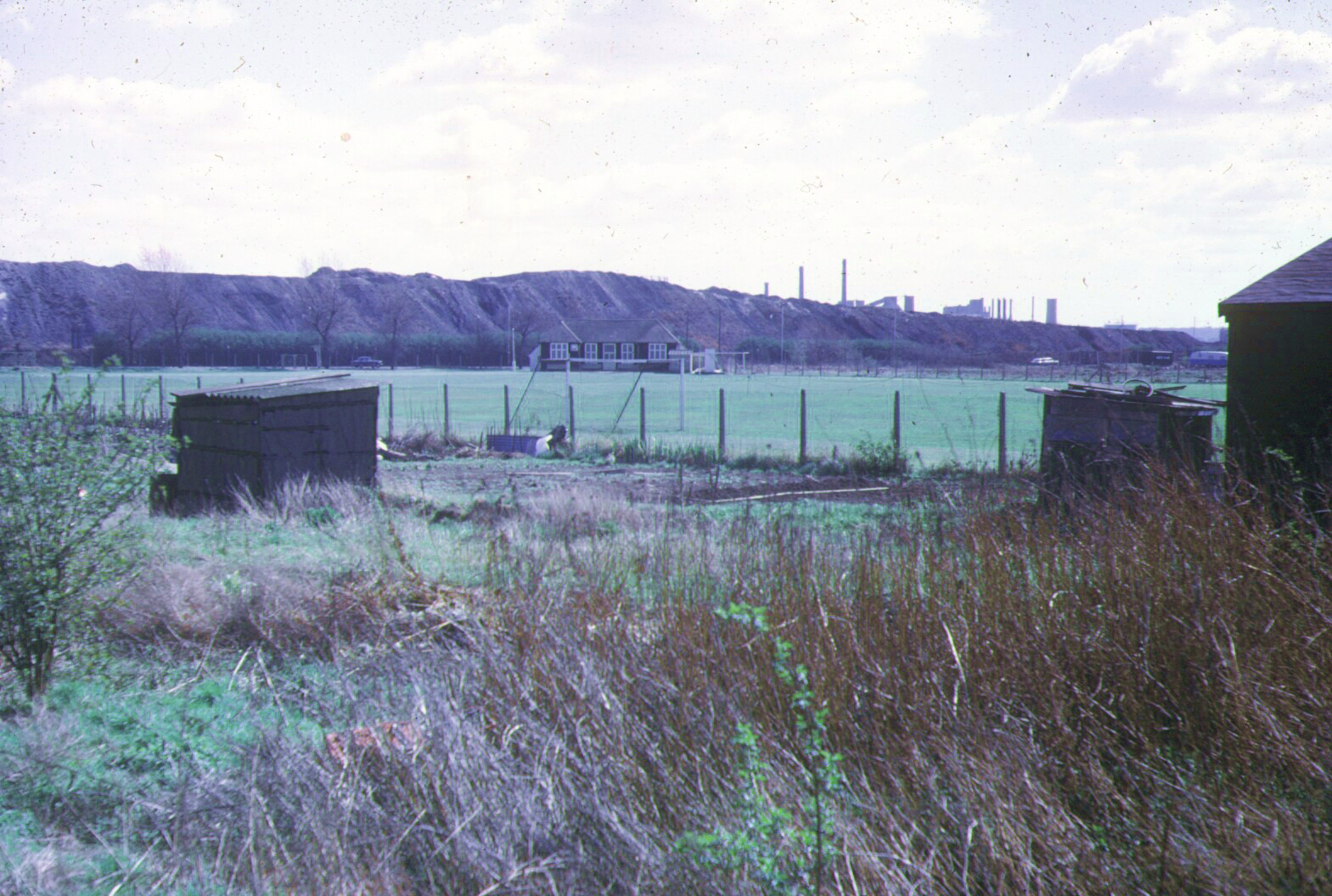
Beckton Alps and Gas Works 1973, from the A13

The toxic spoil heaps from the works are known ironically as Beckton Alps. Originally covering an extensive area to the west of the works, they have been landscaped and much reduced in size. In 1988 an Armada beacon was placed at its summit, one of a national network of beacons commemorating the 400th anniversary of the Spanish Armada. The beacon, a large metal structure, was subsequently stolen. From 1989 to 2001 a dry ski slope, opened by Diana, Princess of Wales, was operated on the small remaining section (grid reference TQ431820), though the nickname pre-dates this. The site is the highest point in Newham, and a Site of Borough Importance for Nature Conservation, Grade II. It is said to be the highest artificial hill in London.

In 2003, a proposed £35m replacement for the site – the SnowWorld indoor centre – ran into financial problems. The site was acquired for development as a hotel in 2013.

The A13/A117 road junction is also named Beckton Alps.

During 2013 the sheets of corrugated iron situated on top of the former dry sky slope were painted in the colour of the Lithuanian national flag (the site is adjacent to London's largest Lithuanian supermarket) but later covered up with the St George Cross in retaliation.

== Beckton Gas Works as a film location ==
The Gasworks, Products Works and Alps were used as a location for TV and cinema filming on a number of occasions.

In the 1960s comedy films and TV programmes, such as Michael Bentine’s It's a Square World, were shot here. The mounds of chemical waste were used to portray mountaineering scenes.

In 1975 the film Brannigan starring John Wayne used the location.

The opening sequence of the 1981 James Bond movie For Your Eyes Only was filmed here. The scenes involved Roger Moore as James Bond attempting to regain control of a helicopter operated by remote control by his nemesis Ernst Stavro Blofeld.

The gasworks buildings were also used in a number of scenes representing a dystopian 1984 London in the 1984 film version of the George Orwell's Nineteen Eighty-Four.

The video for the 1984 Culture Club single 'The War Song' was mainly filmed at the former gasworks buildings.

Part of the 1985 Max Headroom TV Movie 20 Minutes into the Future was shot at Beckton Gas Works.

Derek Jarman's 1986 promotional video for The Smiths 'The Queen is Dead' single was partly shot at Beckton Gas Works.

In 1986, the film Biggles: Adventures in Time used the gasworks as a location for a weapon testing ground. Neil Dickson, who played Biggles in Biggles: Adventures in Time, played a similar character in the 1987 film It Couldn't Happen Here, a surreal, musical journey through the songs of the pop duo Pet Shop Boys. In the film, Dickson drives Neil Tennant and Chris Lowe to an apocalyptic wasteland, the scenes of which were filmed at Beckton, very close to the same area used in Stanley Kubrick's 1987 film Full Metal Jacket.

In the final hour or so of Full Metal Jacket, Stanley Kubrick's 1987 movie portraying the Vietnam War, Matthew Modine (Private Joker), Adam Baldwin (Animal Mother) and their platoon go into Huế, a Vietnamese city, to clear it of Viet Cong and snipers. Kubrick had the whole gasworks selectively demolished and the art department then dressed the 'set' with latticework and appropriate advertising hoardings to make it believable. At one point the soldiers enter a building to flush out a sniper. This building was one of several located between the central buildings of the old gasworks and about 200 yards from the river Thames. The final scene sees the soldiers marching off into the (London) sunset against the silhouettes of the burning gasworks' chimneys and buildings, singing the Mickey Mouse March from the US children's TV show. In the film a period of several days takes place in the protagonists' lives as they travel through Huế city; in reality the action took place within just 1 square mile (2.5 square kilometres). According to Kubrick collaborator Leon Vitali, who worked on Full Metal Jacket, the gasworks were built by an architectural firm that also constructed much of Huế.

Within weeks, British pop/rock trio The Outfield filmed multiple sequences for the video to the band's 1987 hit "Since You've Been Gone", from their album Bangin', at Beckton Gas Works.

The video for Loop's 1990 single 'Arc-lite' was filmed on the set of Full Metal Jacket. The gasworks was used as the main background scene for the video to the 1997 Oasis single 'D'You Know What I Mean?', as it shows the band members playing on a concrete slab within the gasworks.

Several exterior scenes of the 1993 film The Cement Garden starring Charlotte Gainsbourg were filmed here.

The videoclip for Marcella Detroit's 1994 single 'I Believe' was shot in this location, as was a video for The Auteurs single 'Chinese Bakery' that year.

Also, the 1995 TV series Bugs episode 'Out Of The Hive' shows the entire works in a scene where a car drives off an unfinished bridge in flames.

Patrick Keiller's 1997 film Robinson in Space visits Beckton, including 'East Ham Churchyard' ("the largest in England" noted the narrator Paul Scofield) opposite Beckton Alps.

Asylum, a 2000 film of Iain Sinclair and Chris Petit for Channel 4, was partially shot at Beckton Alps while it was still a dry-ski slope.

== Present ==
Virtually no trace of the old gasworks now exists. Bisected by many roads, including the A1020 Royal Docks Road, a small area of the waste tip and some gas holders remain, separated by 1 mile (2 kilometres) or so of redevelopment. Parts of the site are occupied by an industrial estate, the Beckton Retail Park and Gallions Reach Shopping Park.

Part of the extensive industrial railway route has since been used for the Docklands Light Railway between Beckton DLR station and the Royal Docks Road. The site also houses the Beckton DLR depot.

== See also ==
- East Greenwich Gas Works
- Southall Gas Works
- Imperial Gas Works, Fulham
- Nine Elms Gas Works
