= London Borough of Tower Hamlets =

Borough in east London, England

Tower Hamlets
- London borough
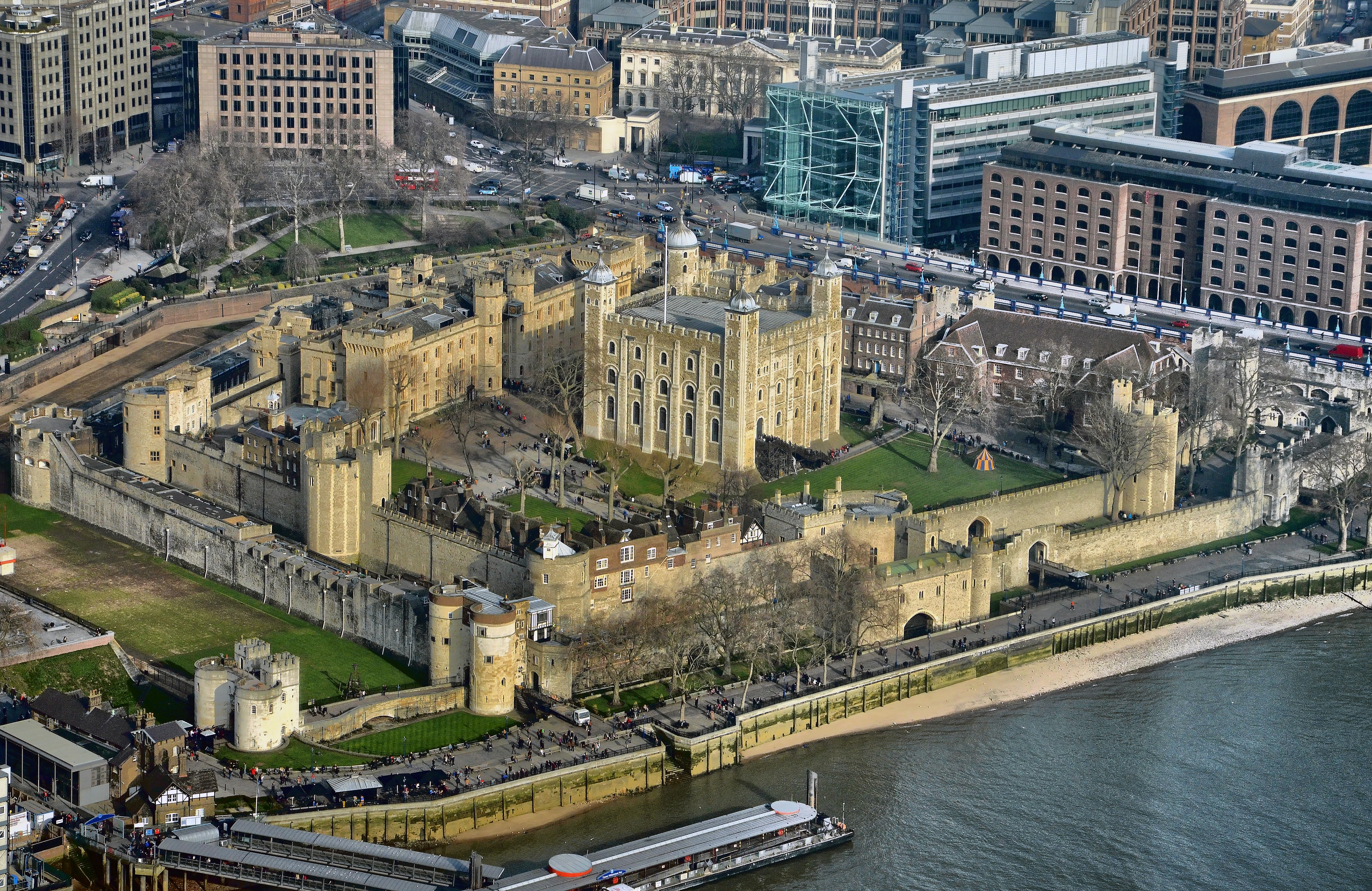
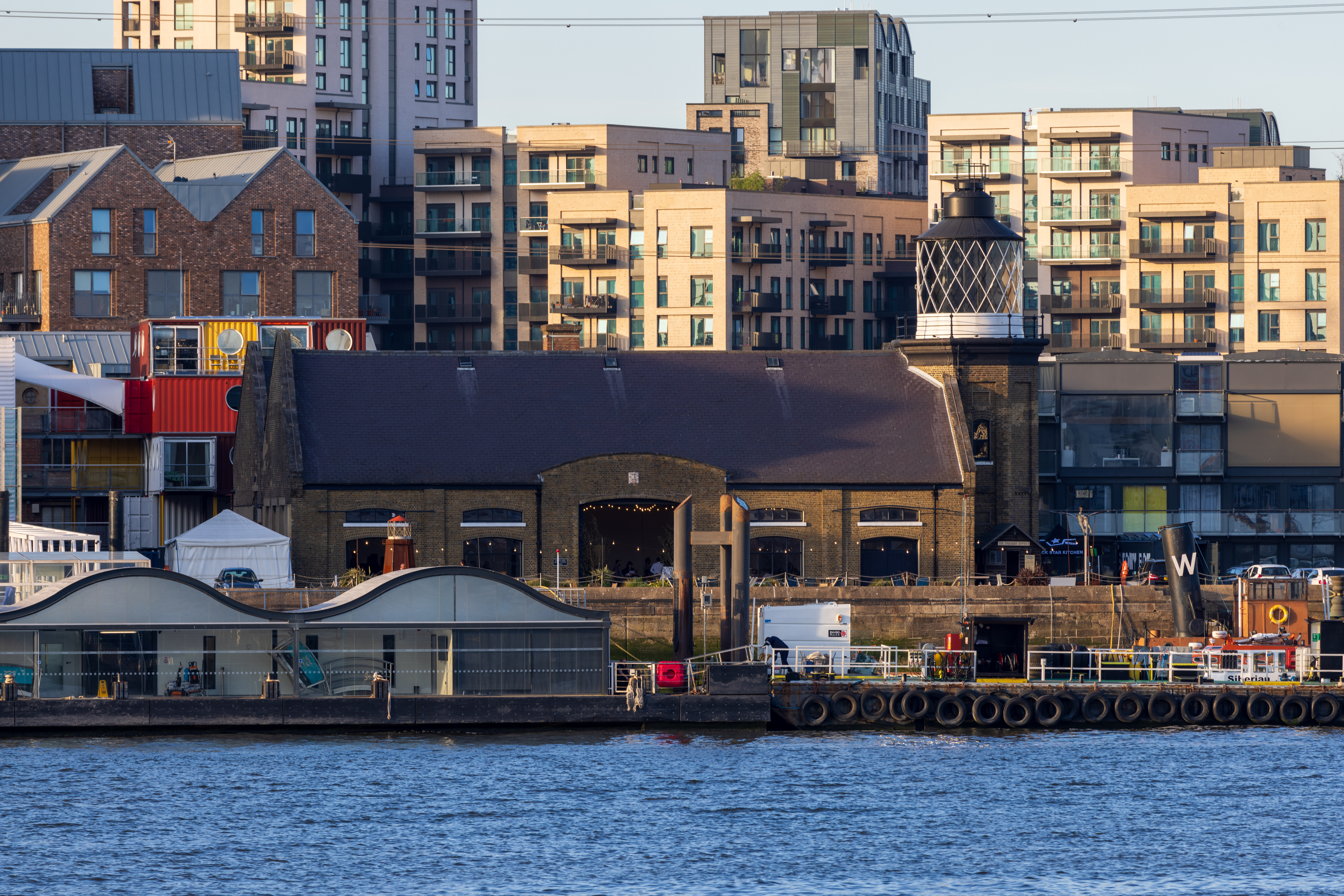
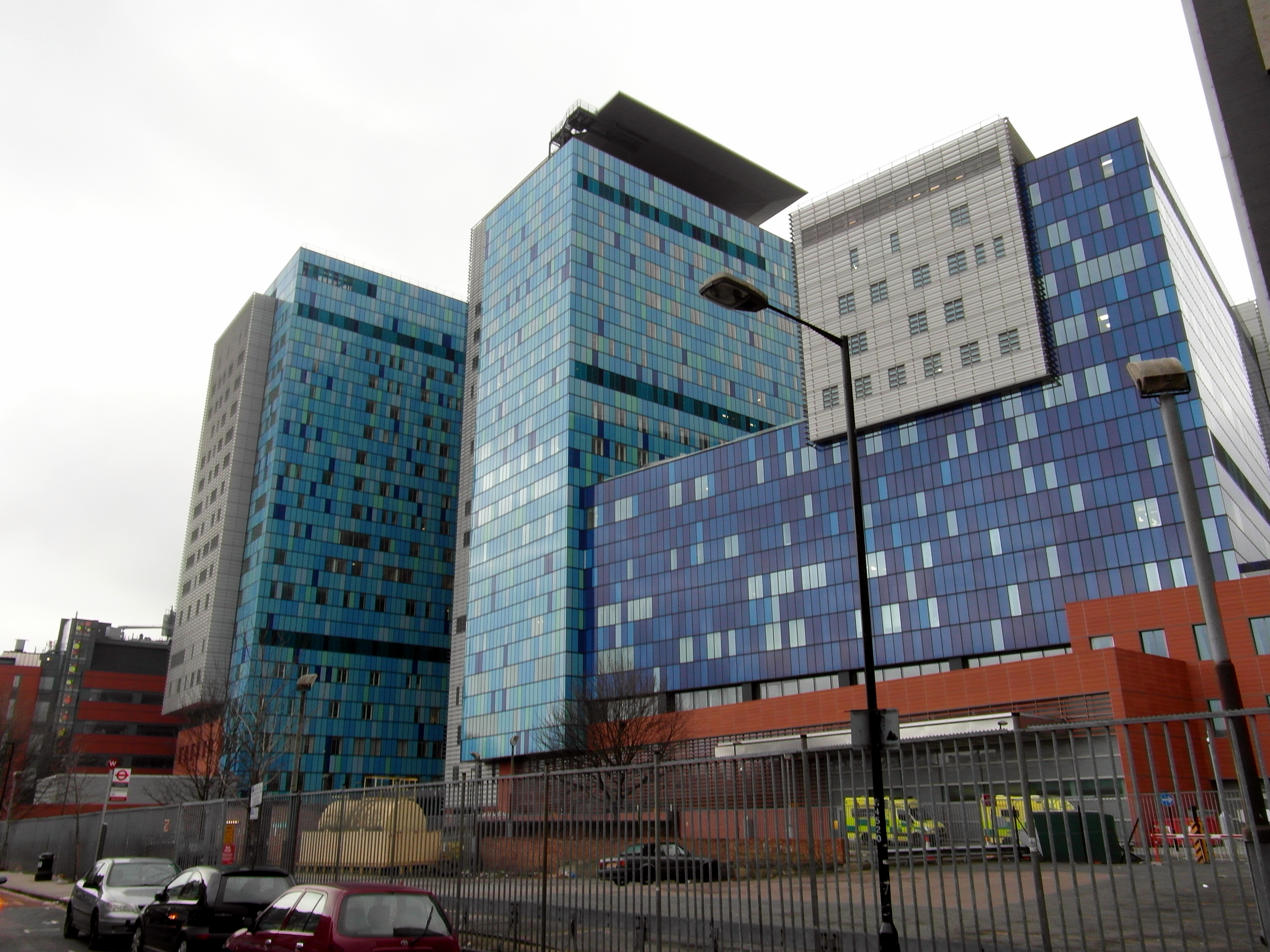
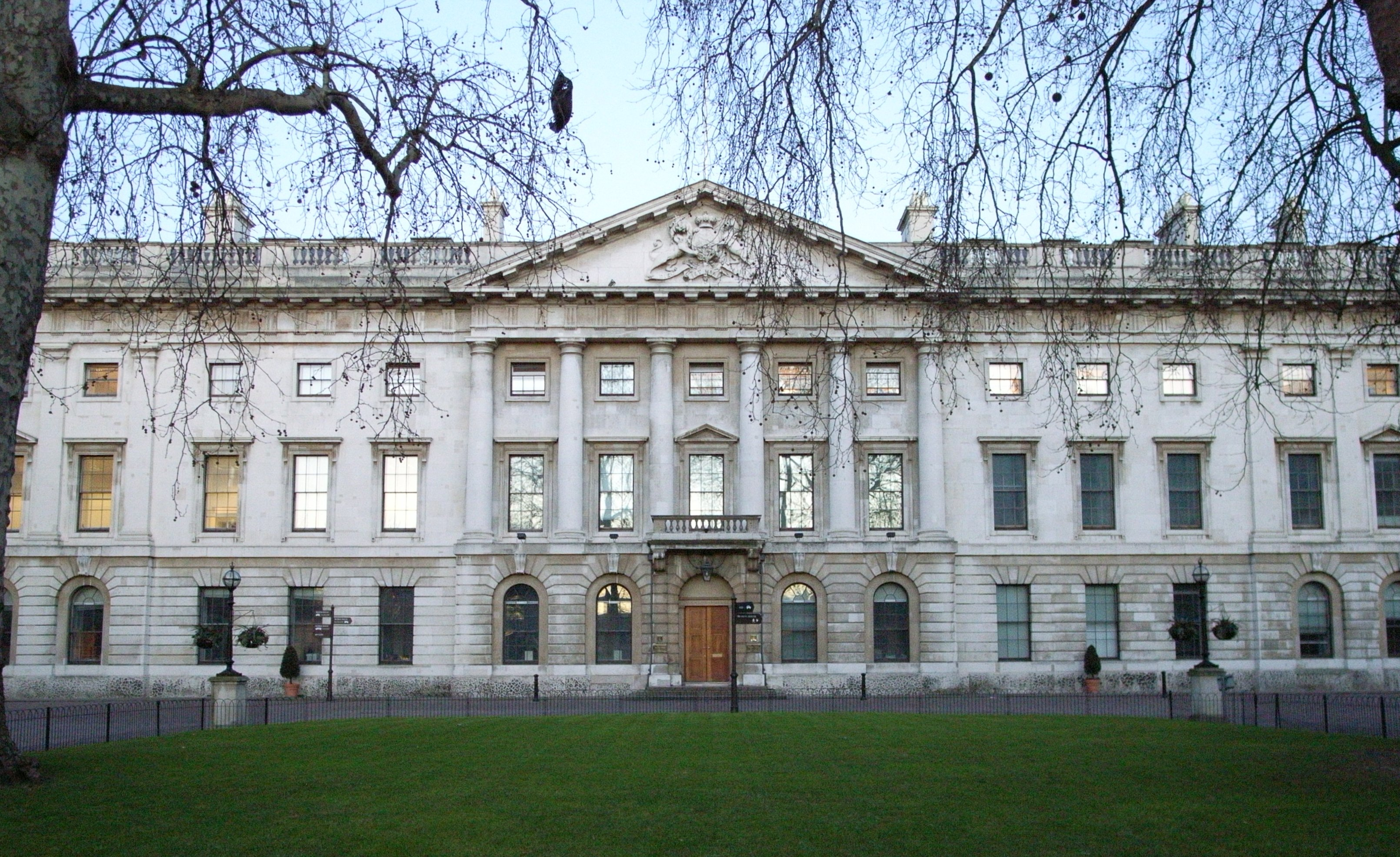
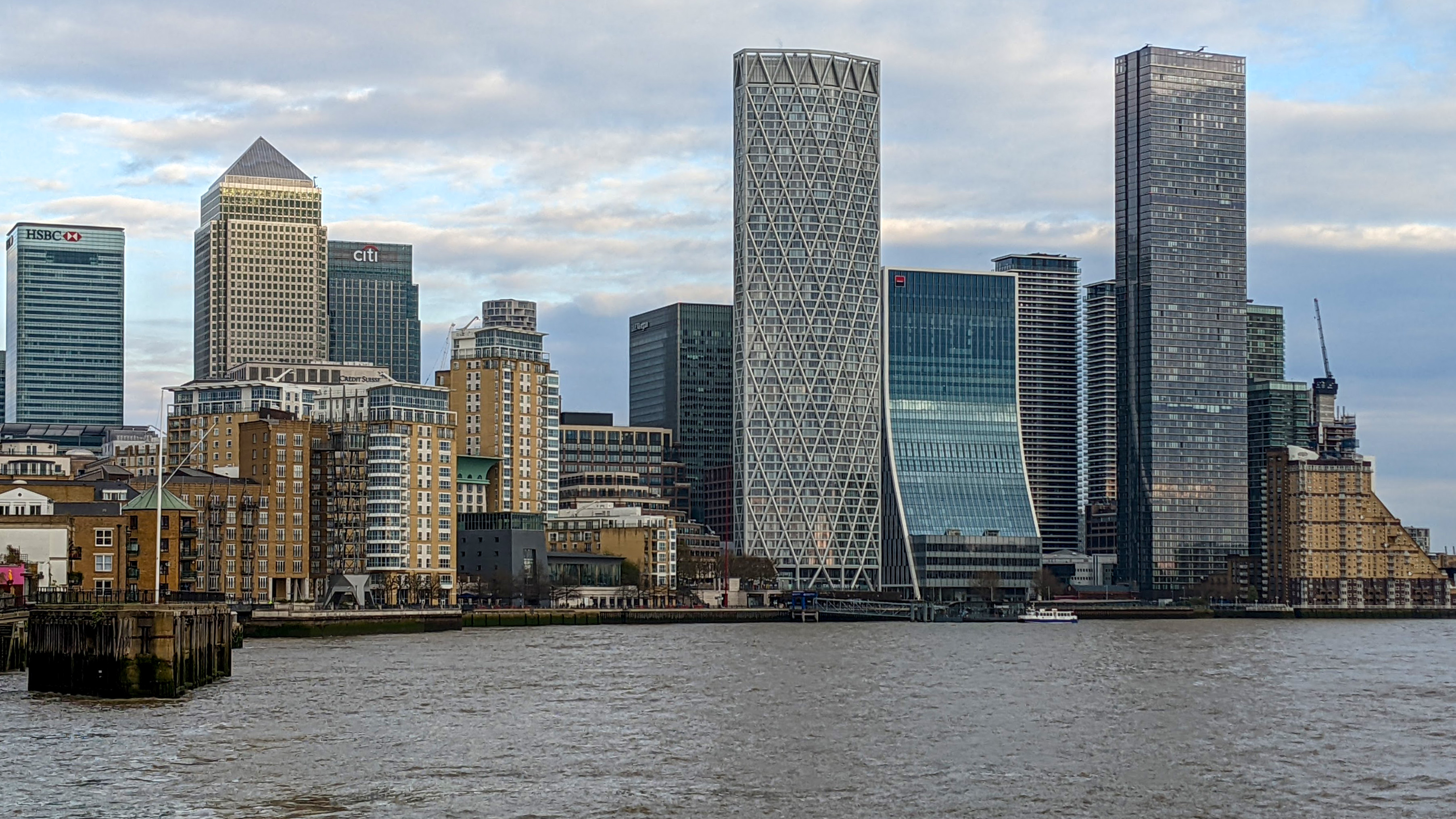
- From the top left; Top: Tower of London and Bow Creek Lighthouse; Middle:Royal London Hospital in Whitechapel and Tower Bridge; Bottom: Royal Mint Court, Embassy of China and Canary Wharf

- Coat of arms Council logo
- Motto: From Great Things to Greater
- Tower Hamlets shown within Greater London
- Coordinates: 51°31′N 0°03′W
- Sovereign state: United Kingdom
- Constituent country: England
- Region: London
- Ceremonial county: Greater London
- Created: 1 April 1965
- Admin HQ: 160 Whitechapel Rd, London E1 1BJ

Government
  - Type: London borough council
  - Body: Tower Hamlets London Borough Council
  - Mayor: Lutfur Rahman
  - London Assembly: Unmesh Desai (Labour) AM for City and East
  - MPs: Rushanara Ali (Labour); Apsana Begum (Labour); Uma Kumaran (Labour, partly in Newham)

Area
  - Total: 7.63 sq mi (19.77 km^{2})
  - Rank: 290th (of 296)

Population (2025)
  - Total: 334,240
  - Rank: 34th (of 296)
  - Density: 43,790/sq mi (16,910/km^{2})
- Time zone: UTC (GMT)
  - Summer (DST): UTC+1 (BST)
- Postcodes: E, EC
- ISO 3166 code: GB-TWH
- ONS code: 00BG
- GSS code: E09000030
- Police: Metropolitan Police
- Website: www.towerhamlets.gov.uk

The London Borough of Tower Hamlets is a borough in London, England. Situated on the north bank of the River Thames and immediately east of the City of London, the borough spans the traditional East End of London and much of the regenerated London Docklands area, including Canary Wharf, one of the world's largest central business districts. The borough had an estimated population of 334,240 in mid-2025.

The borough was formed in 1965 by merger of the former metropolitan boroughs of Stepney, Poplar, and Bethnal Green. 'Tower Hamlets' was originally an alternative name for the historic Tower Division; the area of south-east Middlesex, focused on (but not limited to) the area of the modern borough, which owed military service to the Tower of London, is located in the borough, adjacent to its western boundary with the City of London. Historically, Tower Hamlets is well known for the Whitechapel serial killings attributed to Jack the Ripper, which drew intense crime studies. The events later helped to push the government to pass the Housing of the Working Classes Act and the Public Health (London) Act 1891 which later improved housing and urban living conditions.

Canary Wharf, the borough's metropolitan centre, serves as one of the most important clusters of financial and banking services in the world and occupies some of the major global financial and legal corporations as well a complex of the UK Government. Queen Mary, University of London, Bow Creek Lighthouse, London's only surviving lighthouse, and part of the Queen Elizabeth Olympic Park are also within Tower Hamlets.

Demographically, the borough has a large population of British Bangladeshis, forming the largest single ethnic group in the borough at 32%. The 2011 census showed that the borough had the highest proportion of Muslims of any English local authority and was the only location where Islam outnumbered Christianity. The borough has fifty mosques and many madrasahs, including the East London Mosque, the country's largest. Whitechapel restaurants, neighbouring street market and shops provide the largest range of Bangladeshi cuisine, woodwork, carpets and clothes in Europe. Brick Lane is also a major centre of hipster subculture.

The local authority is Tower Hamlets London Borough Council. In 2017, a joint study by Trust for London and New Policy Institute found the borough to be the 2nd most deprived London borough based on an average calculated across a range of indicators; with high rates of child poverty, unemployment and pay inequality compared to other London boroughs. However, it has the lowest gap for educational outcomes at secondary level. Between 2014 and 2024, Tower Hamlets saw the completion of 71 skyscrapers, more than any other English council.

== History ==
The earliest reference to the name "Tower Hamlets" was in 1554, when the Council of the Tower of London ordered a muster of "men of the hamlets which owe their service to the tower". This covered a wider area than the present-day borough, and its military relationship with the Tower is thought to have been several centuries earlier than the 1554 record.

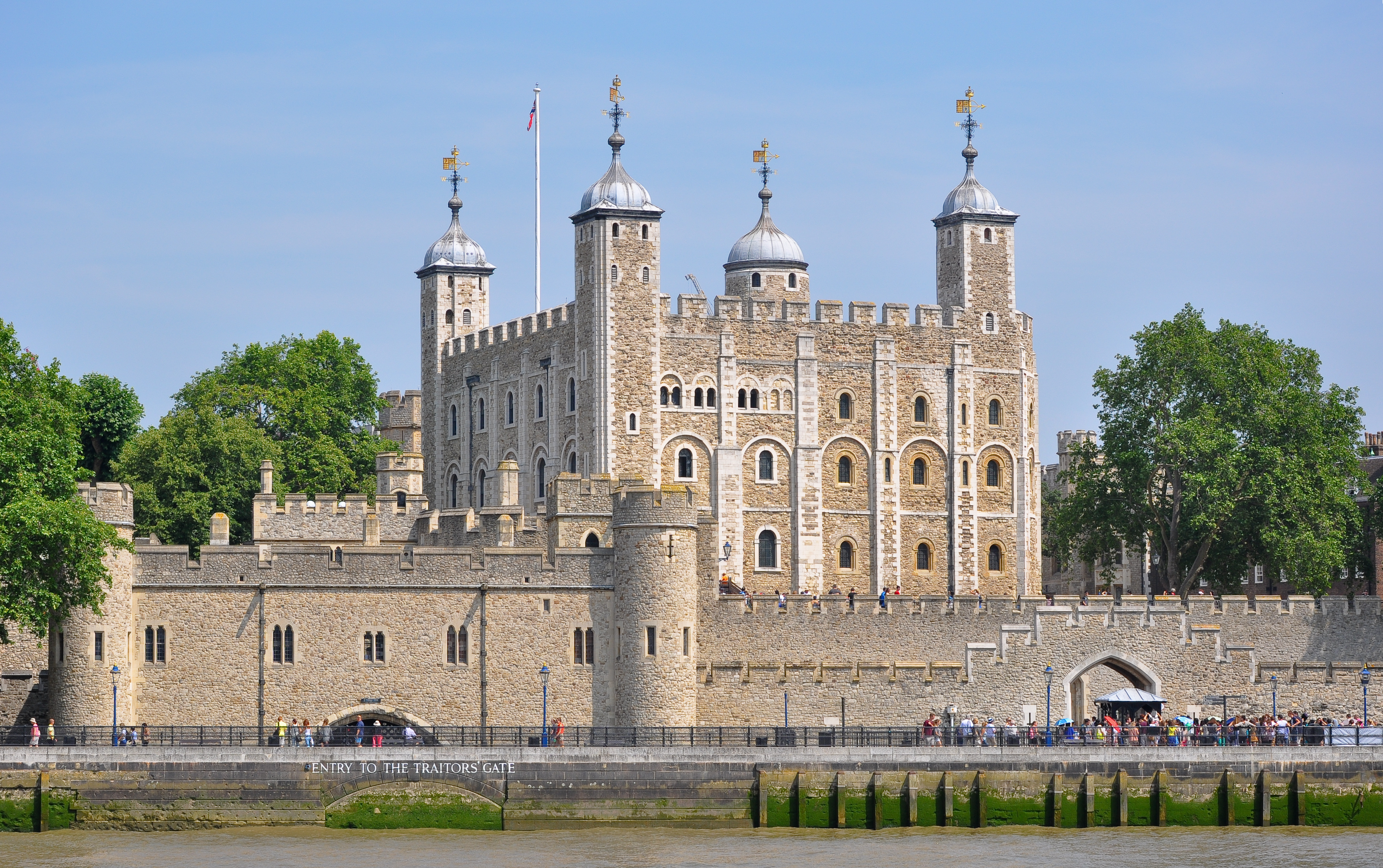
The Tower of London is in the borough, and the borough's name references the hamlets which owed military service to the castle authorities.

In 1605, the Lieutenant of the Tower was given the right to muster the militia and the area east of the tower came to be a distinct military unit, officially called Tower Hamlets (or the Tower Division). The Hamlets of the Tower paid taxes for the militia in 1646.

The borough is closely associated with the Whitechapel murders a series of brutal serial killings by Jack the Ripper. These events drew intense crime research public attention, which ultimately contributed to the instruction of the Housing of the Working Classes Act 1890 and the Public Health Amendment Act 1890, that ultimately renewed efforts by the government to address and reform deteriorated urban conditions in the East End. Hundreds of books and articles discuss the Whitechapel murders, and they feature in novels, short stories, comic books, television shows, and films of multiple genres. On 24 September 1888, George Bernard Shaw commented sarcastically on the media's sudden concern with social justice in a letter to The Star newspaper.

The Trinity Buoy Wharf in Leamouth contains London's only surviving lighthouse. Built between 1864 and 1866 by Sir James Nicholas Douglass, the historic structure functioned as an experimental laboratory for maritime lighting. Today, the regenerated wharf serves as a thriving cultural hub for artists and creative organisations.

The population of Tower Hamlets grew enormously in the 19th century, leading to extreme overcrowding and a concentration of poor people and immigrants throughout the area. (Note: From 1801 to 1821, the population of Bethnal Green more than doubled, and by 1831 had trebled (see table in population section). These incomers were principally weavers. For further details, see Andrew August, Poor Women's Lives: Gender, Work, and Poverty in Late-Victorian London, pp. 35–6 (Fairleigh Dickinson University Press, 1999), ISBN 0-8386-3807-4.) These problems were exacerbated by the construction of St Katharine Docks (1827) (Note: By the early 19th century, over 11,000 people were crammed into insanitary slums in an area, which took its name from the former Hospital of St Katherine that had stood on the site since the 12th century.) and the central London railway termini (1840–1875) with many displaced people moving into the area following the clearance of former slums and rookeries. Over the course of a century, the East End became synonymous with poverty, overcrowding, disease and criminality.

The area was once characterised by rural settlements clustered around the City walls or along the main roads, surrounded by farmland, with marshes and small communities by the river, serving the needs of shipping and the Royal Navy. Until the arrival of formal docks, shipping was required to land goods in the Pool of London, but industries related to construction, repair, and victualling of ships flourished in the area from Tudor times. The area attracted large numbers of rural people looking for employment. Successive waves of foreign immigration began with Huguenot refugees creating a new extramural suburb in Spitalfields in the 17th century. They were followed by Irish weavers, Ashkenazi Jews and, in the 20th century, Bangladeshis.

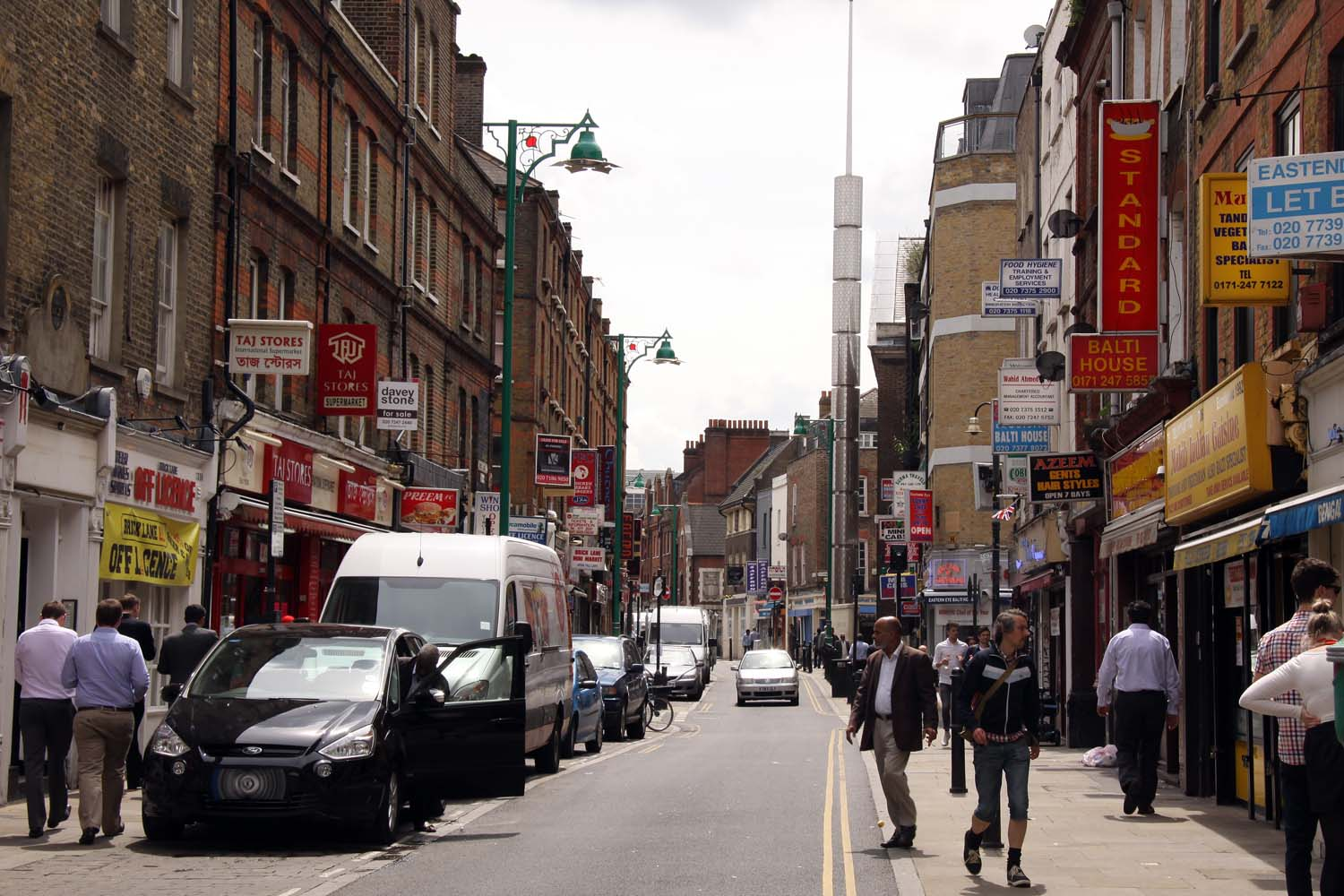
Brick Lane is known for being a significant centre of the British Bangladeshi community

Many of these immigrants worked in the clothing industry. The abundance of semi- and unskilled labour led to low wages and poor conditions throughout the East End. This brought the attentions of social reformers during the mid-18th century and led to the formation of unions and workers associations at the end of the century. The radicalism of the East End contributed to the formation of the Labour Party and demands for the enfranchisement of women.

Official attempts to address the overcrowded housing began at the beginning of the 20th century under the London County Council. Aerial bombing in World War II devastated much of the East End, with its docks, railways and industry forming a continual target. In the separate boroughs making up today's Tower Hamlets a total of 2,221 civilians were killed and 7,472 were injured, with 46,482 houses destroyed and 47,574 damaged. This led to some dispersal of the population to outlying suburbs. New housing was built in the 1950s for those that remained.

The closure of the last of the East End docks in the Port of London in 1980 created further challenges and led to attempts at regeneration and the formation of the London Docklands Development Corporation. The Canary Wharf development, improved infrastructure, and the Queen Elizabeth Olympic Park mean that the East End is undergoing further change, but some of its districts continue to see some of the worst poverty in Britain.

=== Administrative history ===
The area of the modern borough had historically been part of the hundred of Ossulstone in county of Middlesex. Ossulstone was subsequently divided into four divisions, one of which was the Tower Division, also known as the Tower Hamlets, which covered a larger area than the modern borough, also including parts of Hackney. From at least the 17th century the Tower Division was a liberty with judicial and administrative independence from the rest of the county. The liberty appears to have arisen from much older obligations on inhabitants of the area to provide military service to the Constable of the Tower of London.

From 1856 the area was governed by the Metropolitan Board of Works, which was established to provide services across the metropolis of London. In 1889 the Metropolitan Board of Works' area was made the County of London. From 1856 until 1900 the lower tier of local government within the metropolis comprised various parish vestries and district boards. In 1900 the lower tier was reorganised into metropolitan boroughs, including the Metropolitan Borough of Bethnal Green, the Metropolitan Borough of Poplar and the Metropolitan Borough of Stepney.

The modern borough was created in 1965 under the London Government Act 1963. It was a merger of the old boroughs of Bethnal Green, Poplar and Stepney, and was named Tower Hamlets after the historic liberty.

== Geography ==
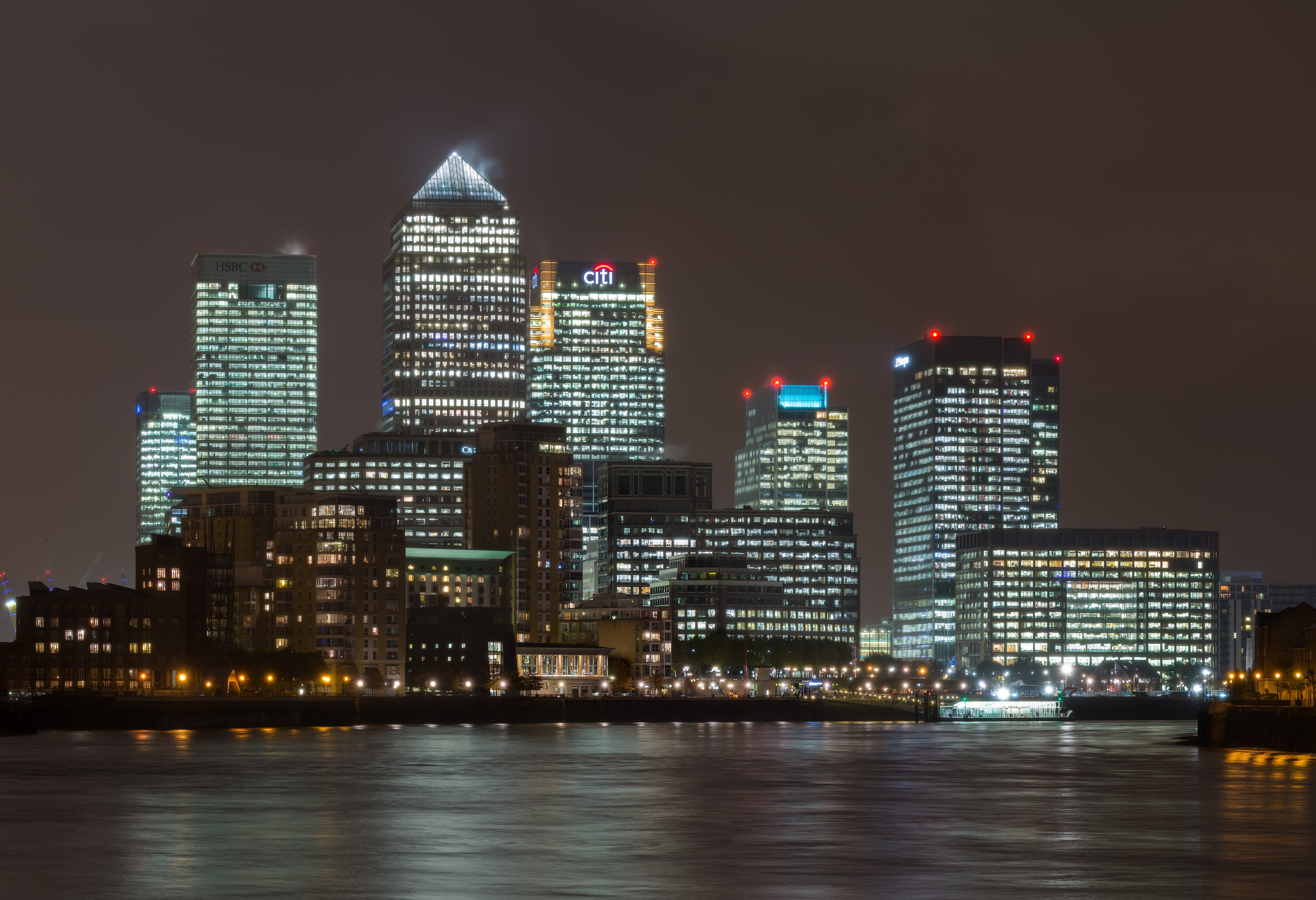
Canary Wharf, world headquarters of major banks and professional services firms

Tower Hamlets is in East London, north of the River Thames. The City of London lies to the west, the London Borough of Hackney to the north, while the River Lea forms the boundary with the London Borough of Newham to the east. The River Lea also forms the boundary between the historic counties of Middlesex and Essex. The borough's Thames frontage extends from the Tower Dock inlet, (Note: The Tower Dock was the western boundary of the Tower Liberties—see map and more recent OS maps. The Liberties indirectly merged into the London Borough of Tower Hamlets via the Borough of Stepney.) immediately west of the Tower of London, through several miles of former docklands, including the Isle of Dogs peninsula, to the confluence of the Thames and Lea at Blackwall. Areas along the Thames and Lea flood plains were historically frequently flooded, but the Thames Barrier, further east, has reduced that risk.

Regent's Canal enters the borough from Hackney to meet the River Thames at Limehouse Basin. A stretch of the Hertford Union Canal leads from the Regent's canal, at a basin in the north of Mile End, to join the River Lea at Old Ford. A further canal, Limehouse Cut, London's oldest, leads from locks at Bromley-by-Bow to Limehouse Basin. Most of the canal tow-paths are open to both pedestrians and cyclists.

The borough includes open spaces such as Victoria Park, King Edward Memorial Park, Mile End Park, Island Gardens and part of the Queen Elizabeth Olympic Park.

Areas, transport, & landmarks in the Borough of Tower Hamlets

=== Districts within the borough ===
Areas within the borough include:

- Bethnal Green
- Blackwall
- Bow
- Bromley-by-Bow
- East Smithfield
- Fish Island
- Isle of Dogs, including Canary Wharf
- Limehouse
- Mile End
- Poplar
- Ratcliff
- Shadwell
- Spitalfields
- St George in the East
- St Katharine's
- Stepney
- The Tower Liberty, taking in Tower Hill
- Wapping
- Whitechapel

=== Landmarks ===
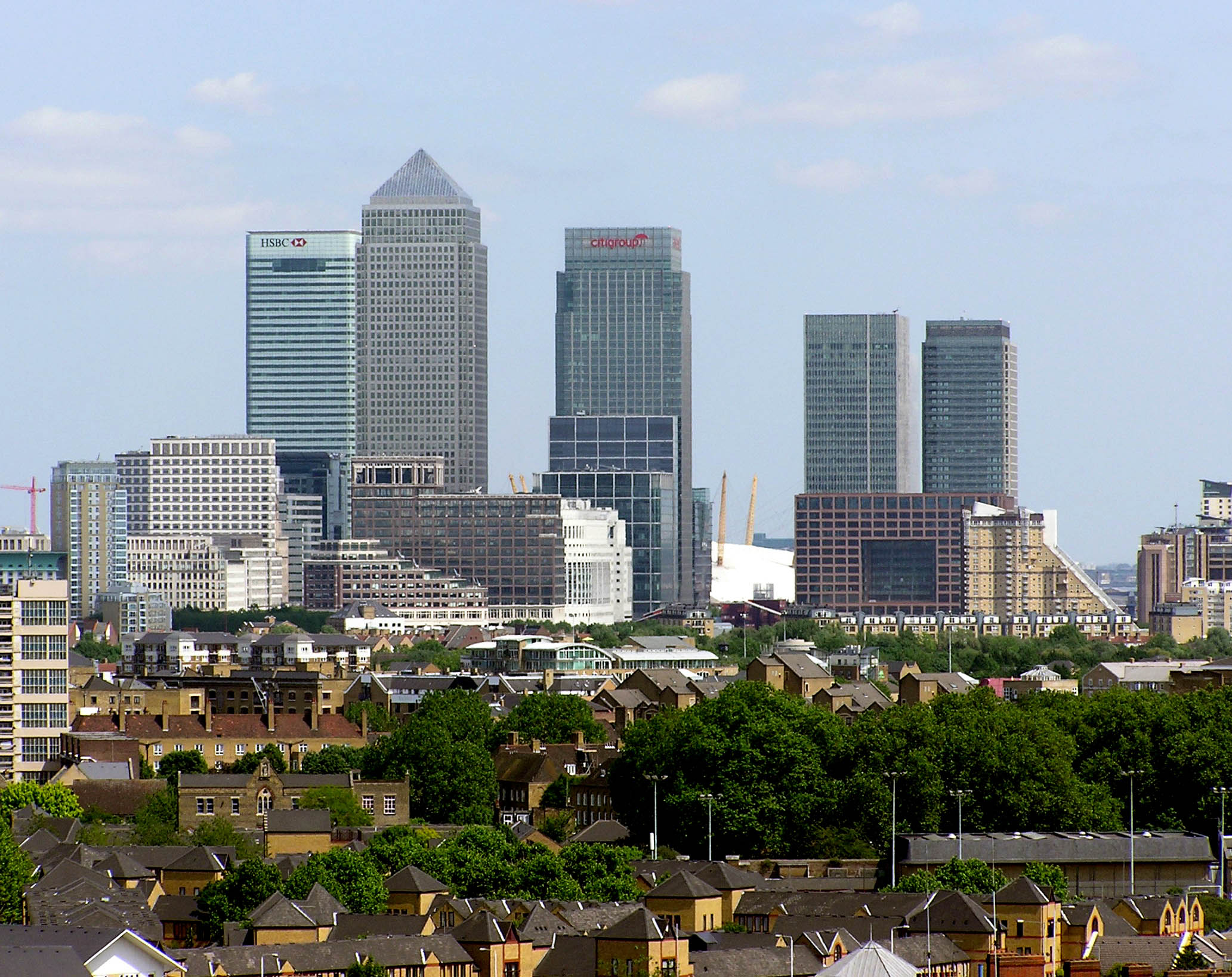
Canary Wharf, seen from a high-level walkway on Tower Bridge

- Brick Lane
- Cable Street - site of the Battle of Cable Street
- Hawksmoor's Christ Church, Spitalfields
- Site of two historic Royal Mints
- Tower of London
- Tower Bridge
- Victoria Park
- Roman Road
- Columbia Road
- Poplar Baths

The Canary Wharf district on the Isle of Dogs in the Docklands forms a group of some of the tallest buildings in Europe. One Canada Square was the first skyscraper to be constructed and is the third tallest in London. Nearby are the HSBC Tower, Citigroup Centres and One Churchill Place, headquarters of Barclays Bank. Within the same complex are the Heron Quays offices.

Part of the Queen Elizabeth Olympic Park, developed for the London 2012 Olympics, lies within the borders of Tower Hamlets.

In 2021, plans were proposed to relocate the Embassy of China in London to Royal Mint Court in East Smithfield. Although Tower Hamlets Council initially rejected the proposal, the UK government granted planning permission and listed building consent on 20 January 2026. A High Court challenge against the decision was dismissed on 31 July 2026.

== Governance ==
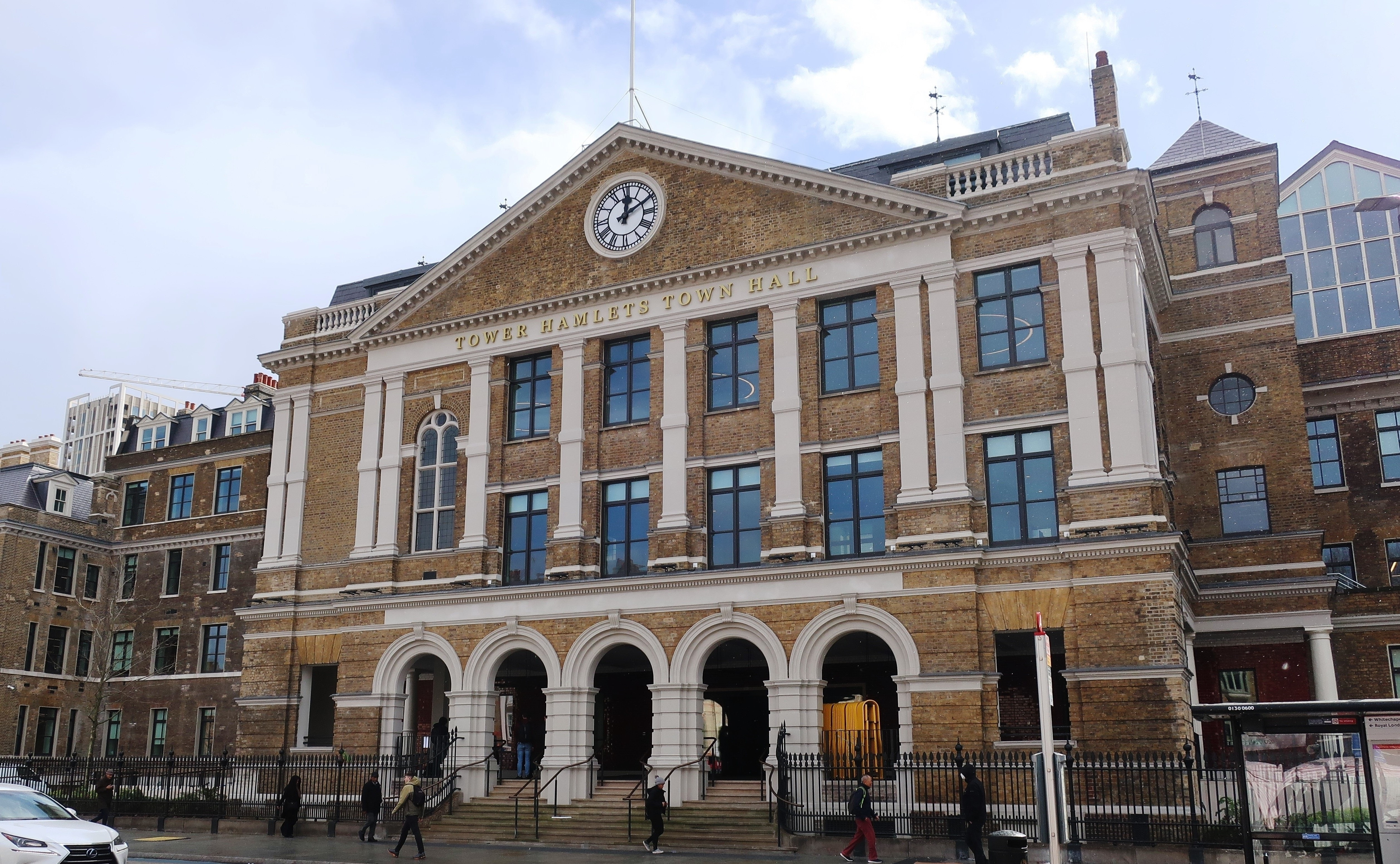
Tower Hamlets Town Hall, 160 Whitechapel Road

The local authority is Tower Hamlets Council, based at Tower Hamlets Town Hall on Whitechapel Road. Since 2010 the council has been led by the directly elected Mayor of Tower Hamlets.

=== Greater London representation ===
Since 2000, the borough lies within the City and East constituency, one of fourteen constituencies which make up the London Assembly, and is represented by Unmesh Desai of the Labour Party.

=== UK Parliament ===
For the 2019 general election, the borough was split into two constituencies:

- Bethnal Green and Bow, represented by Rushanara Ali (Labour).
- Poplar and Limehouse, represented by Apsana Begum (Labour).

Due to the 2023 review of Westminster constituencies, the subsequent general election saw Tower Hamlets elect MPs in three constituencies. These are:

- Stratford and Bow (partly in Newham as well as Tower Hamlets), represented by Uma Kumaran (Labour).
- Bethnal Green and Stepney, represented by Rushanara Ali.
- Poplar and Limehouse (under amended boundaries), represented by Apsana Begum.

== Climate ==
The data below were taken between 1971 and 2000 at the weather station in Greenwich, around 1 mile (1.6 km) south of the borough's former town hall, at Mulberry Place:

Climate data for Greenwich Park, elevation: 47 m (154 ft), 1991–2020 normals, extremes 1948–2004
Month	Jan	Feb	Mar	Apr	May	Jun	Jul	Aug	Sep	Oct	Nov	Dec	Year
Record high °C (°F)	16.8 (62.2)	19.7 (67.5)	23.3 (73.9)	25.3 (77.5)	29.0 (84.2)	34.5 (94.1)	35.3 (95.5)	37.5 (99.5)	30.2 (86.4)	26.1 (79.0)	18.9 (66.0)	16.4 (61.5)	37.5 (99.5)
Mean daily maximum °C (°F)	8.5 (47.3)	9.2 (48.6)	12.1 (53.8)	15.4 (59.7)	18.6 (65.5)	21.4 (70.5)	23.8 (74.8)	23.3 (73.9)	20.3 (68.5)	15.8 (60.4)	11.6 (52.9)	8.9 (48.0)	15.8 (60.4)
Daily mean °C (°F)	5.9 (42.6)	6.2 (43.2)	8.4 (47.1)	10.7 (51.3)	13.8 (56.8)	16.7 (62.1)	18.8 (65.8)	18.7 (65.7)	15.9 (60.6)	12.4 (54.3)	8.8 (47.8)	6.3 (43.3)	11.9 (53.4)
Mean daily minimum °C (°F)	3.4 (38.1)	3.2 (37.8)	4.7 (40.5)	6.0 (42.8)	9.1 (48.4)	12.0 (53.6)	13.9 (57.0)	14.1 (57.4)	11.6 (52.9)	9.0 (48.2)	6.1 (43.0)	3.8 (38.8)	8.1 (46.6)
Record low °C (°F)	−12.7 (9.1)	−9.4 (15.1)	−6.7 (19.9)	−4.8 (23.4)	−1.0 (30.2)	1.1 (34.0)	5.0 (41.0)	5.3 (41.5)	1.1 (34.0)	−2.1 (28.2)	−8.0 (17.6)	−10.5 (13.1)	−12.7 (9.1)
Average precipitation mm (inches)	43.9 (1.73)	39.9 (1.57)	36.5 (1.44)	38.6 (1.52)	44.0 (1.73)	49.3 (1.94)	36.3 (1.43)	53.0 (2.09)	52.4 (2.06)	58.3 (2.30)	59.9 (2.36)	50.7 (2.00)	562.9 (22.16)
Average precipitation days (≥ 1.0 mm)	10.5	9.2	7.9	8.1	7.9	7.8	7.1	8.2	7.9	10.3	10.6	10.2	105.6
Mean monthly sunshine hours	44.4	66.1	109.7	152.9	198.7	198.6	209.2	198.0	140.6	99.7	58.5	50.1	1,526.4
Source 1: Met Office
Source 2: Starlings Roost Weather

== Demographics ==
Population pyramid of the Borough of Tower Hamlets in 2021

Population census
Year	Pop.	±%
1801	130,871	—
1811	160,718	+22.8%
1821	195,941	+21.9%
1831	231,534	+18.2%
1841	275,250	+18.9%
1851	330,548	+20.1%
1861	410,101	+24.1%
1871	489,653	+19.4%
1881	569,205	+16.2%
1891	584,936	+2.8%
1901	578,143	−1.2%
1911	571,438	−1.2%
1921	529,114	−7.4%
1931	489,956	−7.4%
1941	337,774	−31.1%
1951	232,860	−31.1%
1961	195,883	−15.9%
1971	164,699	−15.9%
1981	139,989	−15.0%
1991	167,985	+20.0%
2001	196,121	+16.7%
2011	254,096	+29.6%
2021	310,300	+22.1%
2024 estimate	331,886	+7.0%
Note: 2024 estimate

By 1891, Tower Hamlets – roughly the ancient civil parish of Stepney – was already one of the most populated areas in London. Throughout the nineteenth century, the local population increased by an average of 20% every ten years. The building of the docks intensified land use and caused the last marshy areas in the south of the parish to be drained for housing and industry. In the north of the borough, employment was principally in weaving, small household industries like boot and furniture making and new industrial enterprises like Bryant and May. The availability of cheap labour drew in many employers. To the south, employment was in the docks and related industries – such as chandlery and rope making.

By the middle of the nineteenth century, the district now recognised as Tower Hamlets was characterised by overcrowding and poverty. The construction of the railways caused many more displaced people to settle in the area, and a massive influx of Eastern European Jews at the latter part of the nineteenth century added to the population growth. This migration peaked at the end of that century and population growth entered a long decline through to the 1960s, as people moved away eastwards to newer suburbs of London and Essex. The area's population had neared 600,000 around the end of the nineteenth century, but fell to a low of less than 140,000 by the early 1980s.

The metropolitan boroughs suffered very badly during World War II, during which considerable numbers of houses were destroyed or damaged beyond use due to heavy aerial bombing. This coincided with a decline in work in the docks, and the closure of many traditional industries. The Abercrombie Plan for London (1944) began an exodus from London towards the new towns.

This decline began to reverse with the establishment of the London Docklands Development Corporation bringing new industries and housing to the brownfield sites along the river. Also contributing was new immigration from Asia beginning in the 1970s. According to the 2001 UK Census the population of the borough is approximately 196,106. According to the ONS estimate, the population is 237,900, as of 2010.

Crime in the borough increased by 3.5% from 2009 to 2010, according to figures from the Metropolitan Police, having decreased by 24% between 2003/04 and 2007/08.

Tower Hamlets has one of the smallest White British populations of any local authority in the United Kingdom. No ethnic group forms a majority of the population; a plurality of residents are white (45%), a little over two thirds of whom are White British. 32% of residents are Bangladeshi, which is the largest ethnic minority group in the borough, with Asians as a whole forming 41% of the population. A smaller proportion are of Black African and Caribbean descent (7%), with Somalis representing the second-largest minority ethnic group. Those of mixed ethnic backgrounds form 4%, while other ethnic groups form 2%. The White British proportion was recorded as 31.2% in the 2011 UK Census, a decrease from 42.9% in 2001.

In 2018, Tower Hamlets had the lowest life expectancy and the highest rate of heart disease of all London boroughs, along with Newham.

The 2021 census found that the borough has one of the lowest proportions of population over the age of 65 or older in England and Wales, at 5.6%.

=== Ethnicity ===
Ethnic makeup of Tower Hamlets by single year ages in 2021

Ethnic demography of the London Borough of Tower Hamlets over time

Ethnic Group	Year													
Ethnic Group	1966 estimations		1971 estimations		1981 estimations		1991 census		2001 census		2011 census		2021 census	
Ethnic Group	Number	%	Number	%	Number	%	Number	%	Number	%	Number	%	Number	%
White: Total	–	95.7%	–	91.4%	108,776	76.2%	107,481	63.9%	100,799	51%	114,819	45%	122,266	39.3%
White: British	–	–	–	–	–	–	–	–	84,151	43%	79,231	31%	71,177	22.9%
White: Irish	–	1.4%	–	–	–	–	–	–	3,823	2%	3,863	2%	3,567	1.1%
White: Gypsy or Irish Traveller	–	–	–	–	–	–	–	–	–	–	175	0%	110	0.0%
White: Roma	–	–	–	–	–	–	–	–	–	–	–	–	2,225	0.7%
White: Other	–	–	–	–	–	–	–	–	12,825	7%	31,550	12%	45,187	14.6%
Asian or Asian British: Total	–	2.3%	–	–	23,234	16.3%	46,084	27.4%	75,380	38%	104,501	41%	137,856	44.5%
Asian or Asian British: Indian	–	–	–	–	1,378		1,730		3,001	2%	6,787	3%	10,135	3.3%
Asian or Asian British: Pakistani	–	–	–	–	990		1,239		1,486	1%	2,442	1%	3,341	1.1%
Asian or Asian British: Bangladeshi	–	–	–	–	18,888	13.2%	39,429	23.5%	65,553	33%	81,377	32%	107,333	34.6%
Asian or Asian British: Chinese	–	–	–	–	1,056		1,825		3,573	2%	8,109	3%	10,279	3.3%
Asian or Asian British: Other Asian	–	–	–	–	922		1,861		1,767	1%	5,786	2%	6,768	2.2%
Black or Black British: Total	–	2%	–	–	9,011	6.3%	11,940	7.1%	12,742	6%	18,629	7%	22,693	7.4%
Black or Black British: African	–	0.2%	–	–	2,363		3,969		6,596	3%	9,495	4%	15,373	5.0%
Black or Black British: Caribbean	–	1.8%	–	–	5,270		6,055		5,225	3%	5,341	2%	4,930	1.6%
Black or Black British: Other Black	–	–	–	–	1,378		1,916		921	0%	3,793	1%	2,390	0.8%
Mixed or British Mixed: Total	–	–	–	–	–	–	–	–	4,873	2%	10,360	4%	15,409	5%
Mixed: White and Black Caribbean	–	–	–	–	–	–	–	–	1,568	1%	2,837	1%	3,593	1.2%
Mixed: White and Black African	–	–	–	–	–	–	–	–	789	0%	1,509	1%	2,236	0.7%
Mixed: White and Asian	–	–	–	–	–	–	–	–	1,348	1%	2,961	1%	4,374	1.4%
Mixed: Other Mixed	–	–	–	–	–	–	–	–	1,168	1%	3,053	1%	5,206	1.7%
Other: Total	–	–	–	–	1,702		2,584		2,312	1%	5,787	3%	12,082,	3.9%
Other: Arab	–	–	–	–	–	–	–	–	–	–	2,573	1%	3,588	1.2%
Other: Any other ethnic group	–	–	–	–	–	–	–	–	2,312	1%	3,214	1%	8,494	2.7%
Ethnic minority: Total	–	4.3%	–	8.6%	33,947	23.8%	60,608	36%	95,307	49%	139,277	55%	188,040	60.8%
Total	–	100%	–	100%	142,723	100%	168,089	100%	196,106	100.00%	254,096	100.00%	310,306	100%

=== Sex and gender ===
The 2021 census also provided gender and sex profiles of the Tower Hamlets borough:

==== Sex ====
Sex	Observation	%
Female	154437	49.8%
Male	155869	50.2%

==== Gender ====
Gender identity (8 categories)	Observation	%
Gender identity the same as sex registered at birth	229263	90.7%
Gender identity different from sex registered at birth but no specific identity given	1438	0.6%
Trans woman	344	0.1%
Trans man	350	0.1%
Non-binary	350	0.1%
All other gender identities	161	0.1%
Not answered	20975	8.3%

=== Age ===
The 2021 census additionally provided age profiles of the Tower Hamlets borough:

Age Range	Observations	%
Ages 0–14	54143	17.4%
Ages 15–24	50353	16.2%
Ages 25–44	137596	44.3%
Ages 45–64	50740	16.4%
Ages 65+	17471	5.6%

=== Immigration data ===
This list includes top-15 sources of immigration to Borough of Tower Hamlets for 2021 census:

#	Country	Number
1	Bangladesh	43,561
2	Italy	10,553
3	India	6,317
4	China	4,818
5	France	4,562
6	Spain	3,791
7	Somalia	3,107
8	Poland	3,077
9	Romania	2,765
10	United States	2,728
11	Germany	2,401
12	Ireland	2,315
13	Australia	2,239
14	Brazil	2,218
15	Greece	1,945

== Religion and religious sites ==
Religious makeup of Tower Hamlets by single year age groups in 2021

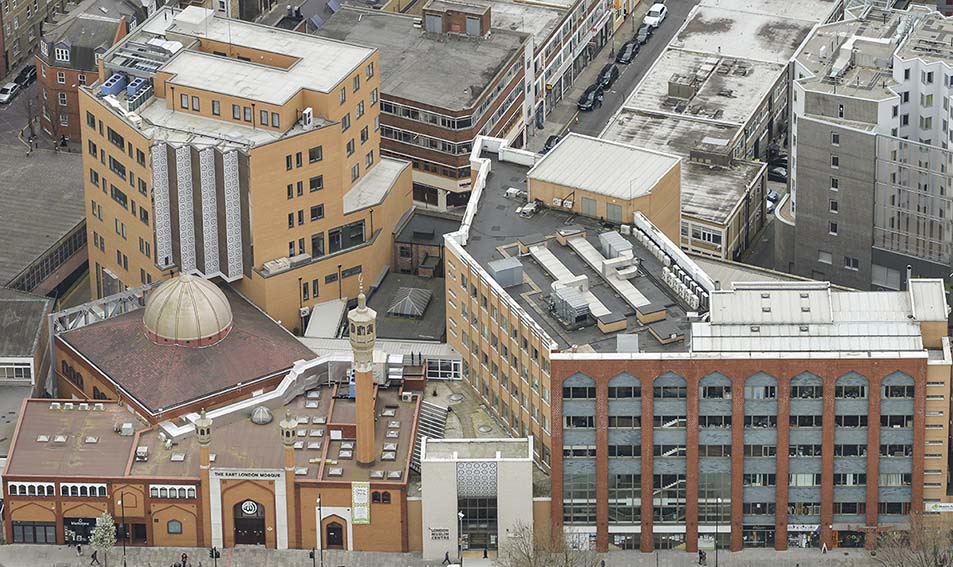
East London Mosque complex, Whitechapel

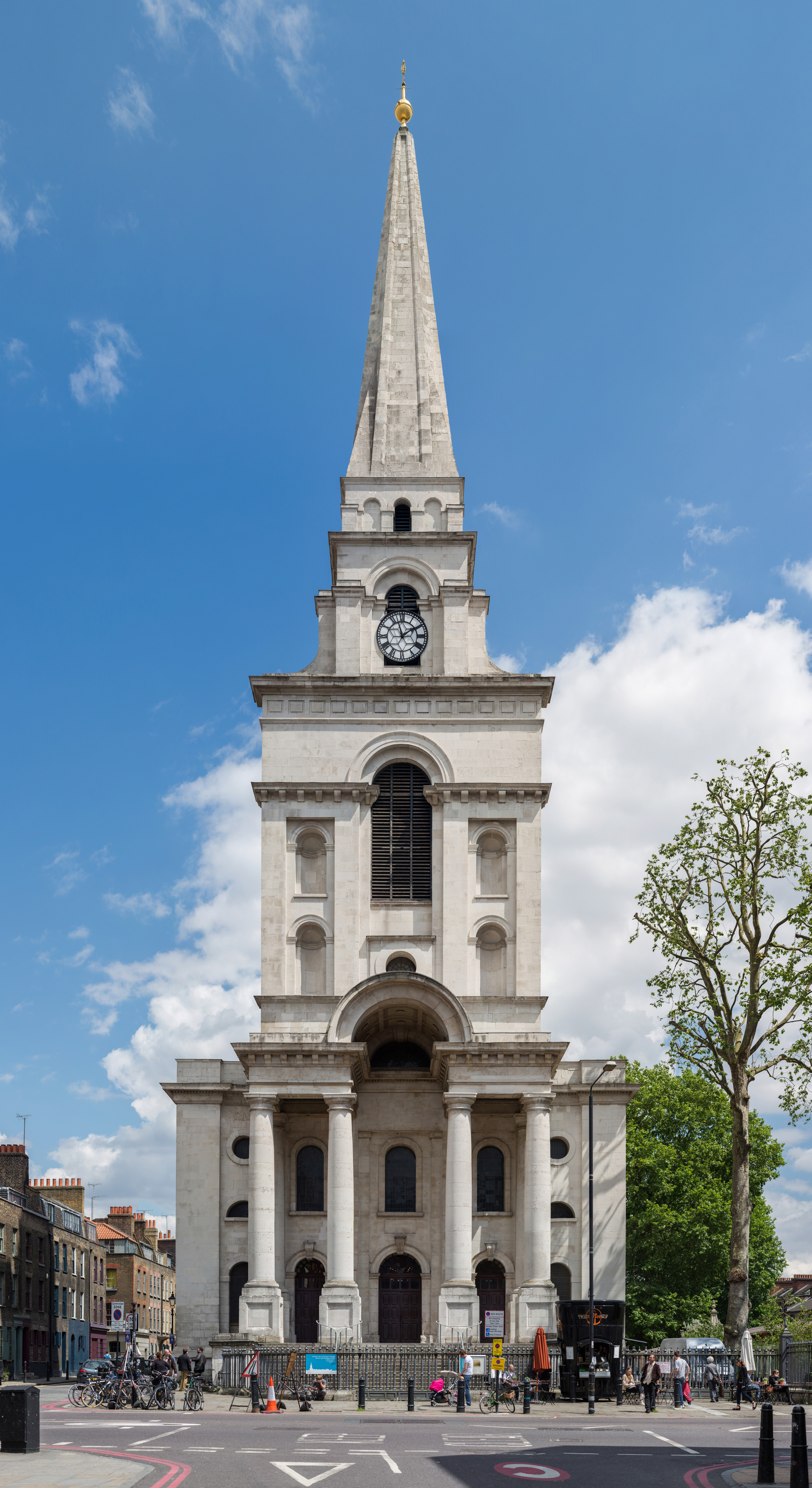
Christ Church of Spitalfields

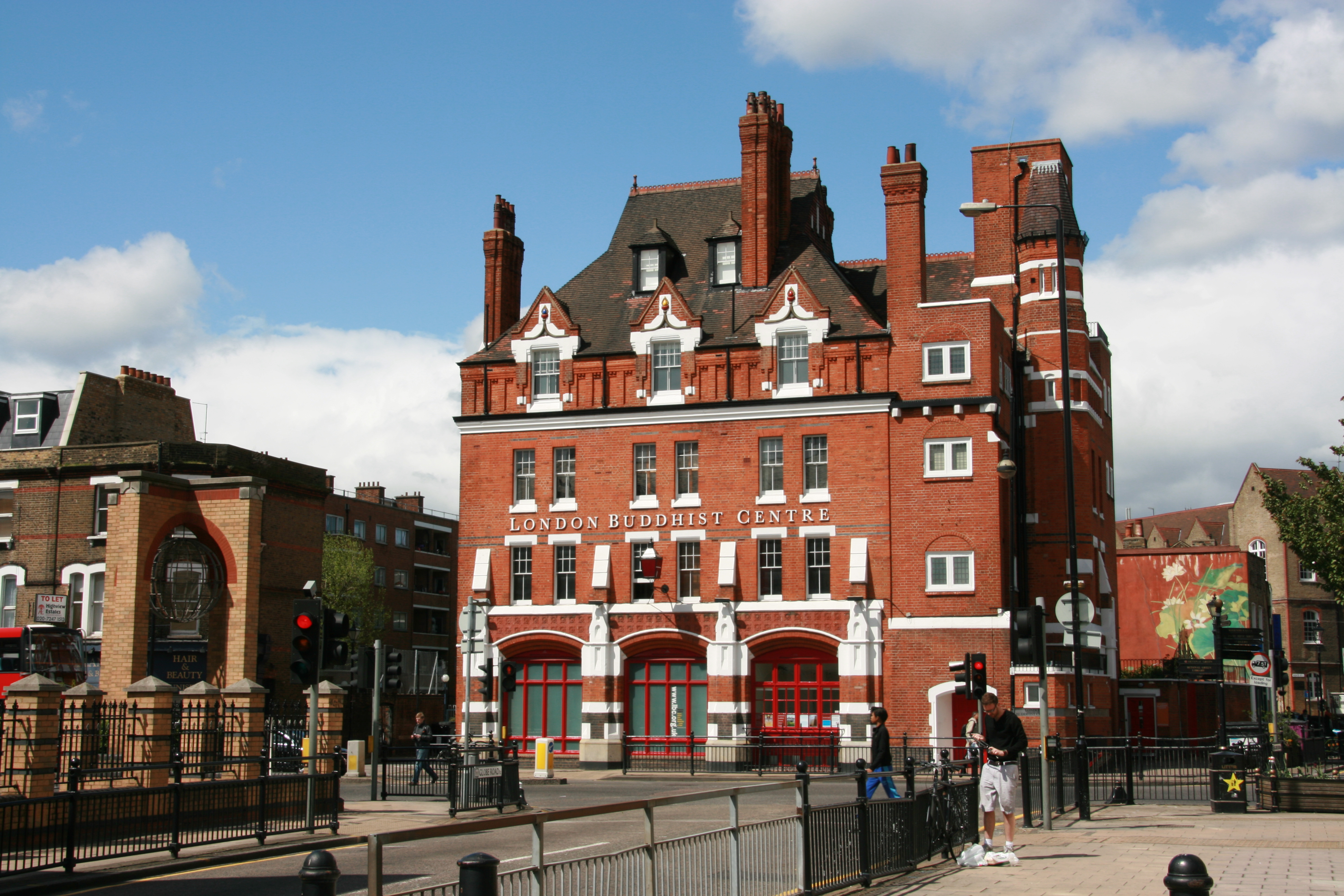
London Buddhist Centre, Bethnal Green

Tower Hamlets is a religiously diverse borough with various places of worship. According to the 2021 census, 39.9% of the population was Muslim, 22.3% Christian, 2.0% Hindu, 1.0% Buddhist, 0.4% Jewish, 0.3% Sikh, 0.5% followed some other religion, 26.6% were not affiliated to a religion and 6.9% did not state their religious views.

The following table shows the religious identity of residents residing in Tower Hamlets according to the 2001, 2011 and the 2021 censuses.

Religion	1995 estimates		2001 census		2011 census		2021 census	
Religion	Number	%	Number	%	Number	%	Number	%
Holds religious beliefs	–	–	153,692	78.4	166,359	65.5	206,347	66.5
Muslim	–	–	71,389	36.4	87,696	34.5	123,912	39.9
Christian	–	–	75,783	38.6	68,808	27.1	69,223	22.3
Hindu	–	–	1,544	0.8	4,200	1.7	6,298	2.0
Buddhist	–	–	1,938	1.0	2,726	1.1	2,961	1.0
Jewish	6,000	3.7%	1,831	0.9	1,283	0.5	1,341	0.4
Sikh	–	–	682	0.3	821	0.3	966	0.3
Other religion	–	–	525	0.3	825	0.3	1,652	0.5
No religion	–	–	27,823	14.2	48,648	19.1	82,635	26.6
Religion not stated	–	–	14,591	7.4	39,089	15.4	21,318	6.9
Total population	–	100%	196,106	100.0	254,096	100.0	310,300	100.0

=== Places of worship ===
There are 21 active churches affiliated with the Church of England, which include Christ Church of Spitalfields, St Paul's Church of Shadwell and St Dunstan's of Stepney; and there are also churches of many other Christian denominations.

There are more than 40 mosques and Islamic centres in Tower Hamlets. The most famous is the East London Mosque, one of the first mosques in Britain allowed to broadcast the adhan, and one of the biggest Islamic centres in Europe. The Maryam Centre, a part of the mosque, is the biggest Islamic centre for women in Europe. Opened in 2013, it features a main prayer hall, ameliorated funeral services, education facilities, a fitness centre and support services. The East London Mosque has been visited by several notable people, including Prince Charles, Boris Johnson, many foreign government officials and world-renowned imams and Muslim scholars. Other notable mosques are Brick Lane Mosque, Darul Ummah Masjid, Esha Atul Islam Mosque, Markazi Masjid, Stepney Shahjalal Mosque and Poplar Central Mosque.

The borough has a strong Islamist influence through the Islamic Forum of Europe, part of the Jamaat-e-Islami.

Other notable religious buildings include the Fieldgate Street Great Synagogue, the Congregation of Jacob Synagogue, the London Buddhist Centre, the Hindu Pragati Sangha Temple, and the Gurdwara Sikh Sangat. The Great Synagogue of London, which was destroyed during the Second World War, is located just outside the borough's boundaries, in the City.

== Economy ==
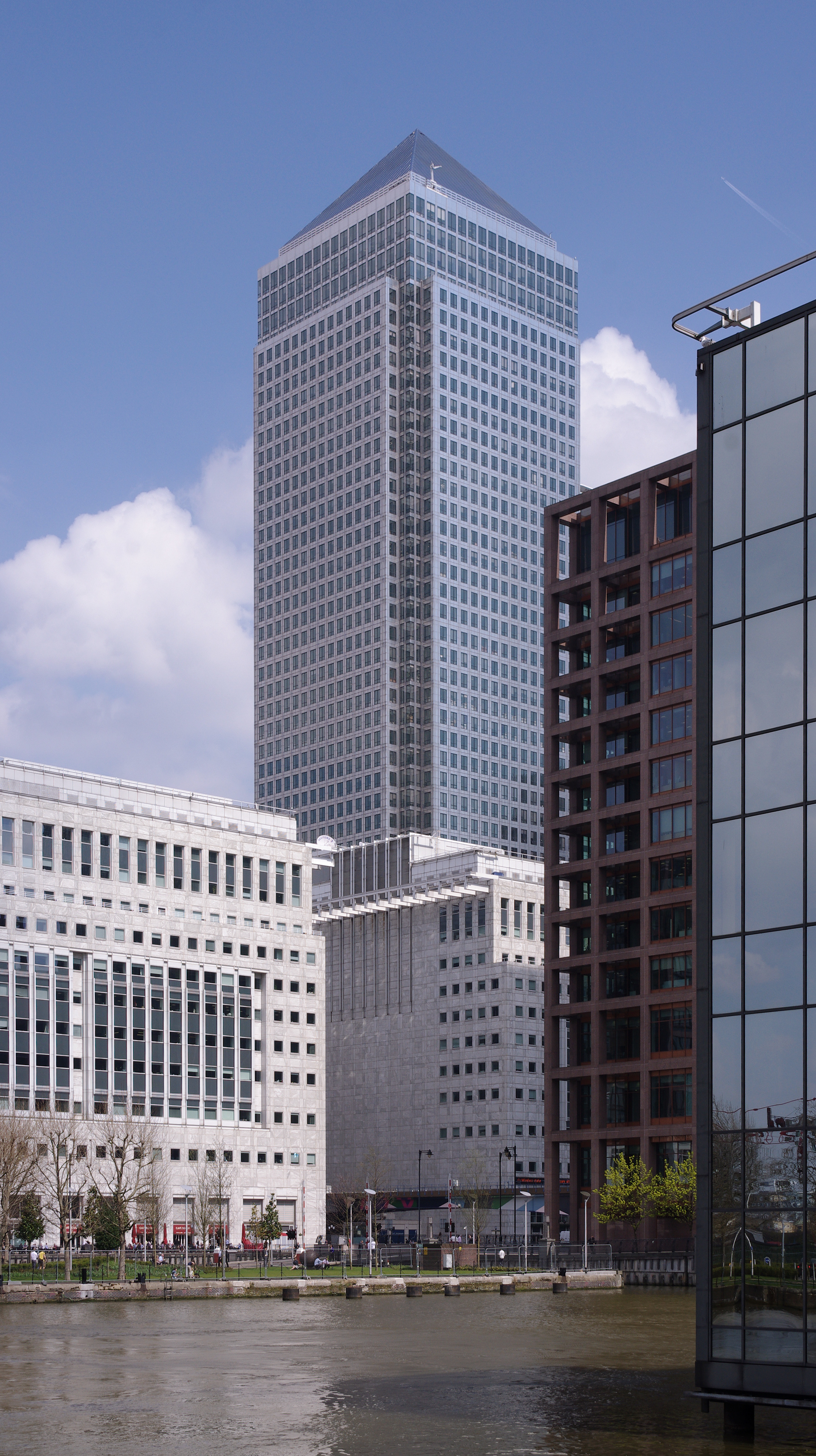
One Canada Square, the 35th-tallest building in Europe and currently the third tallest completed building in the United Kingdom, the tallest being The Shard

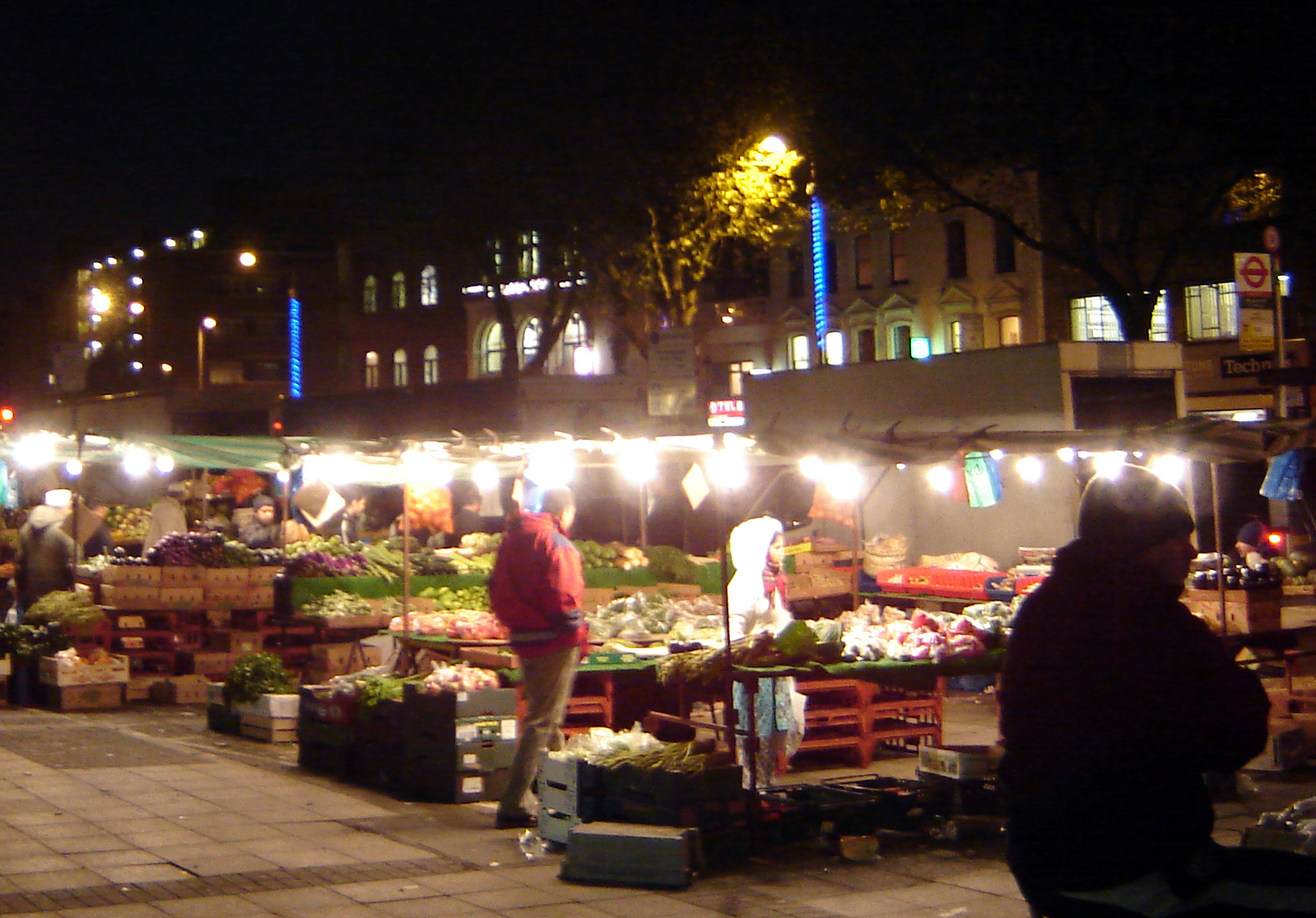
The market area in Whitechapel

The borough hosts the world headquarters of many global financial businesses, employing some of the highest paid workers in London, but also has high rates of long-term illness and premature death and the 2nd highest unemployment rate in London.

Canary Wharf is home to many of the world and European headquarters of numerous major banks and professional services firms including Barclays, Citigroup, Clifford Chance, Credit Suisse, Infosys, Fitch Ratings, HSBC, J.P. Morgan, KPMG, MetLife, Morgan Stanley, RBC, Skadden, State Street and Thomson Reuters. Savills, a top-end estate agency recommends that 'extreme luxury' and ultra-modern residential properties are to be found at Canary Riverside, West India Quay, Pan Peninsula and Neo Bankside. Tower Hamlets is the earliest borough where the first skyscrapers were built and since 2014 it saw the completion of over seventy skyscrapers, more than any other place in the UK.

The End Child Poverty coalition published that Tower Hamlets has the highest proportion of children in poverty of any local authority in the UK at 49% (and as high as 54.5% in the Bethnal Green South ward).

Surveys and interviews conducted by the Child Poverty Action group for the council found that the Universal Credit system was deeply unpopular with low-income families in the borough and that most claimants who have used the system found it difficult to understand and experienced frequent payment errors.

== Media ==
The East London Advertiser and Social Streets provide local news in print and online. There are also several Bengali print and online newspapers published in the borough.

== Education ==
The Blizard Building of Queen Mary University of London, housing the Institute of Cell and Molecular Sciences

The London Borough of Tower Hamlets is the local education authority for state schools within the borough. In January 2008, there were 19,890 primary-school pupils and 15,262 secondary-school pupils attending state schools there. Private-school pupils account for 2.4 per cent of schoolchildren in the borough. In 2010, 51.8 per cent of pupils achieved 5 A*–C GCSEs including Mathematics and English – the highest results in the borough's history – compared to the national average of 53.4 per cent. Seventy-four per cent achieved 5 A*–C GCSEs for all subjects (the same as the English average); the figure in 1997 was 26 per cent. The percentage of pupils on free school meals in the borough is the highest in England and Wales. In 2007, the council rejected proposals to build a Goldman Sachs-sponsored academy.

Schools in the borough have high levels of racial segregation. The Times reported in 2006 that 47 per cent of secondary schools were exclusively non-white, and that 33 per cent had a white majority. About 60 per cent of pupils entering primary and secondary school are Bangladeshi. 78% of primary-school pupils speak English as a second language.

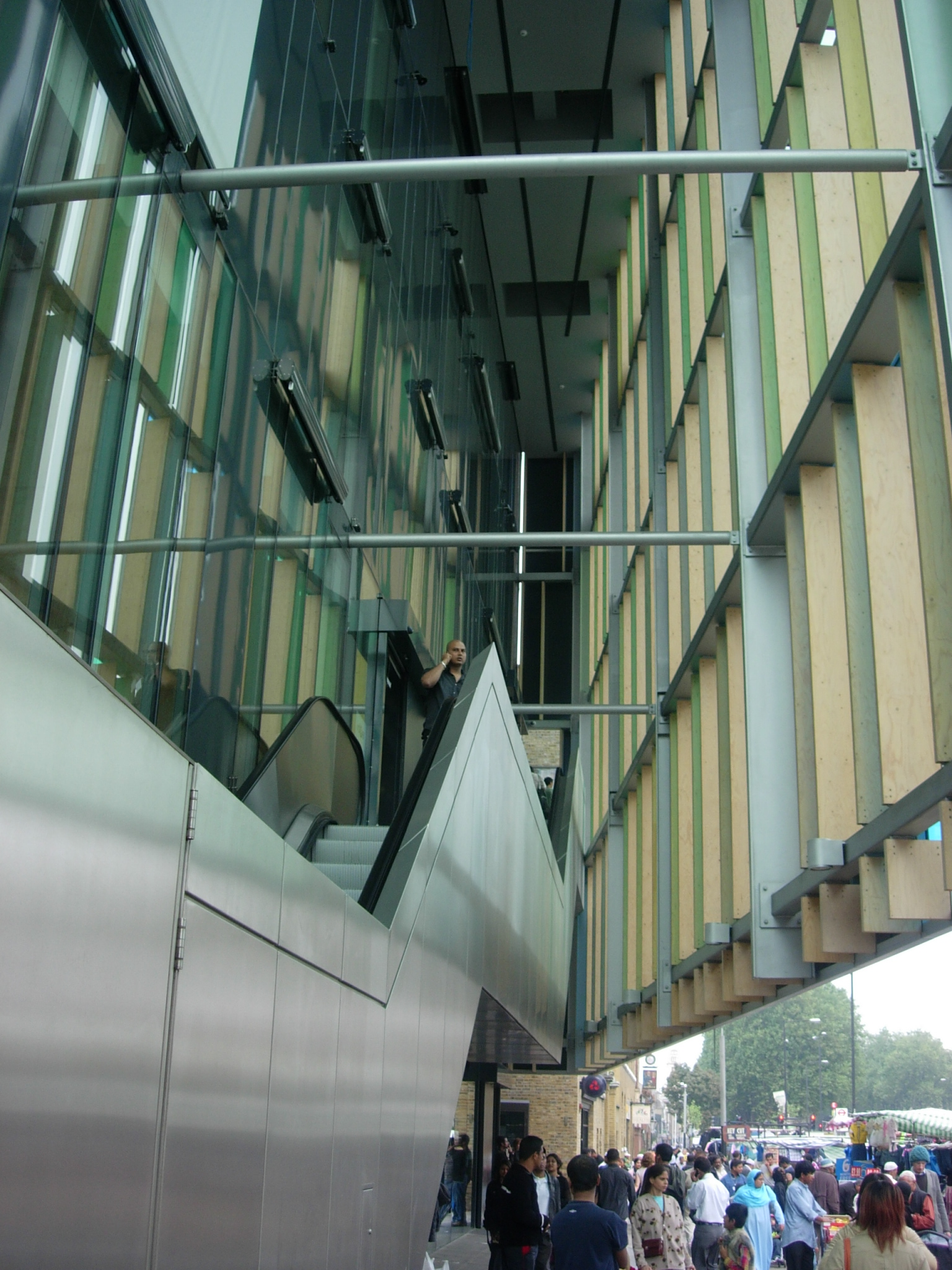
Whitechapel Idea Store (library)

The council runs several Idea Stores in the borough, which combine traditional library and computer services with other resources, and are designed to attract more diverse members. The flagship Whitechapel store was designed by David Adjaye, and cost £16 million to build.

=== Universities ===
- Queen Mary University of London, a constituent college of the University of London, which includes Barts and The London, Queen Mary's School of Medicine and Dentistry
- London Metropolitan University
- UCL School of Management, located in One Canada Square, Canary Wharf
- The London Interdisciplinary School, located on Whitechapel Road
- Northeastern University - London, located in St, Katherines docks

=== Further education colleges ===
- Tower Hamlets College, which in 2017 merged with Hackney Community College and Redbridge College to form New City College, the second largest college in London with over 20,000 students.

=== Schools and sixth form colleges ===
- Bishop Challoner Catholic School
- Bow School
- Central Foundation Girls' School
- George Green's School
- Ibrahim College
- Jamiatul Ummah School and Sixth Form
- Langdon Park School
- Lansbury Lawrence School
- London East Academy (East London Mosque)
- London Enterprise Academy
- Mazahirul uloom London
- Morpeth School
- Mulberry Academy Shoreditch
- Mulberry School for Girls
- Oaklands School
- St Paul's Way Trust School
- Stepney All Saints School
- Stepney Green Maths, Computing & Science College
- Swanlea School, Business and Enterprise College
- Wapping High School

=== Volunteering ===
- Volunteer Centre Tower Hamlets helps residents find volunteering work and provides support to organisations involving students volunteers.

== Sports ==
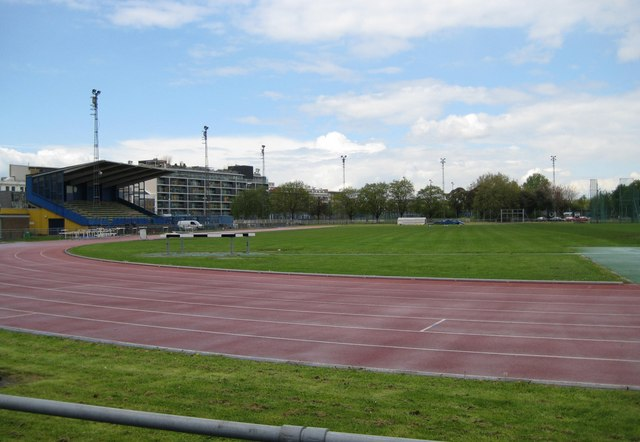
Mile End Stadium

Mile End Stadium within Mile End Park hosts an athletics stadium and facilities for football and basketball. Two football clubs, Tower Hamlets F.C. (formerly Bethnal Green United) and Sporting Bengal United F.C., are based in the stadium, playing in the Essex Senior Football League.

John Orwell Sports Centre in Wapping is the base of Wapping Hockey Club. In 2014, the club secured over £300,000 of investment to designate the centre a hockey priority facility.

A leisure centre including a swimming pool at Mile End Stadium was completed in 2006. Other pools are located at St Georges, Limehouse and York Hall, in Bethnal Green. York Hall is also a regular venue for boxing tournaments, and in May 2007 a public spa was opened in the building's renovated Victorian-style Turkish baths.

KO Muay Thai Gym and Apolaki Krav Maga & Dirty Boxing Academy in Bethnal Green are the main sources for martial arts and combat sports training in the area.

The unusual Green Bridge, opened in 2000, links sections of Mile End Park that would otherwise be divided by Mile End Road. The bridge contains gardens, water features and trees around the path.

=== Queen Elizabeth Olympic Park ===
Tower Hamlets was one of five host boroughs for the 2012 Summer Olympics; the Queen Elizabeth Olympic Park was constructed in the Lea Valley. As such, the borough's involvement in the Olympics includes:

- A small part of the Olympic Park is in Bow, a district of the borough, which makes the borough a host borough.
- The energy centre (King's Yard Energy Centre) of the Olympic Park is in the London Borough of Tower Hamlets, and gives energy to all the venues, none of which are located in Tower Hamlets.
- The world square and the London 2012 mega-store is also in the borough. The world square is for spectators, who can buy food or drink; the world's biggest McDonald's is in the world square in Tower Hamlets.
- The London 2012 mega-store provides official gifts and souvenirs. High Street, which is the main road to the Olympic park from west and central London, combines Whitechapel Road, Mile End Road and Bow Road.
- Victoria Park, in Tower Hamlets, is an important part of the Olympics because spectators without tickets can watch the games on big screens (London live 2012); that park is less than a mile away from the Olympic park. The main spectator cycle park is located in Victoria park. One of the entrances to the Olympic park is in Tower Hamlets, and is called the Victoria gate.
- A few schools in Tower Hamlets have taken part in the opening and closing ceremonies of the Olympic and Paralympic games as well as all the other host boroughs. The section of the Olympic Park in Tower Hamlets will be named "Sweetwater", one of the 5 new neighbourhoods after the games. Sweetwater will cover Tower Hamlets' part of the Olympic Park near Old Ford.
- The Olympic marathon was planned to run through the borough but later ran through the City and Westminster. However, the U-turn was located in the borough near The Tower of London.
- Danny Boyle, the artistic director of the London 2012 opening ceremony, lives in Mile End.
- A large number of Tower Hamlets' residents became Olympic volunteers; Tower Hamlets ranks second, after neighbouring borough Newham, for the number of volunteers from the borough.

== Leisure ==
=== Parks in Tower Hamlets ===
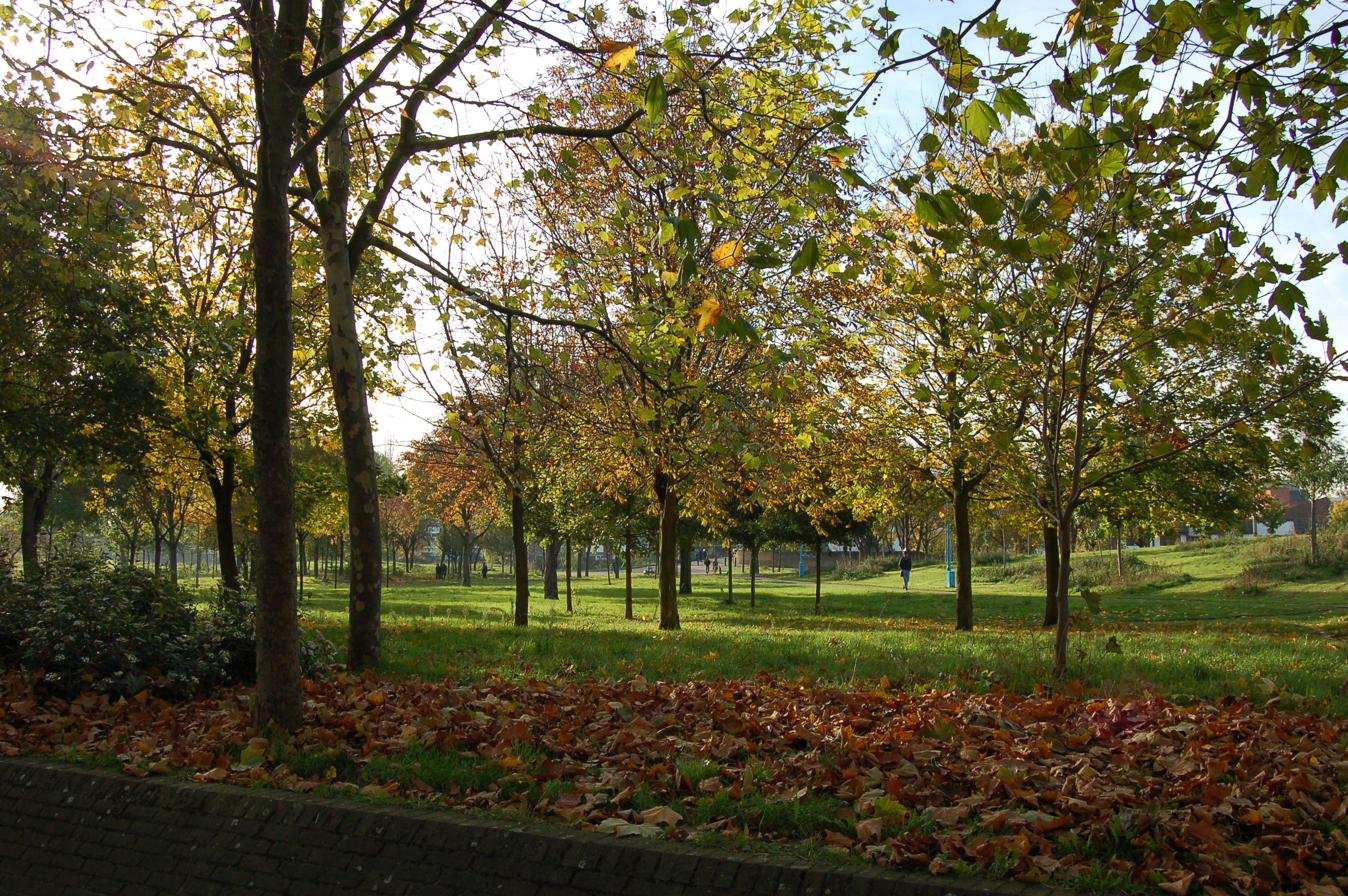
Mile End Park

There are over one hundred parks and open spaces in Tower Hamlets ranging from the large Victoria Park, to numerous small gardens and squares. The second largest, Mile End Park, separated from Victoria Park by a canal, includes The Green Bridge that carries the park across the busy Mile End Road. One of the smallest at 1.19 ha is the decorative Grove Hall Park off Fairfield Road, Bow, which was once the site of a lunatic asylum. Other parks include Altab Ali Park, Mudchute Park and Grove Hall Park.

=== Museums ===
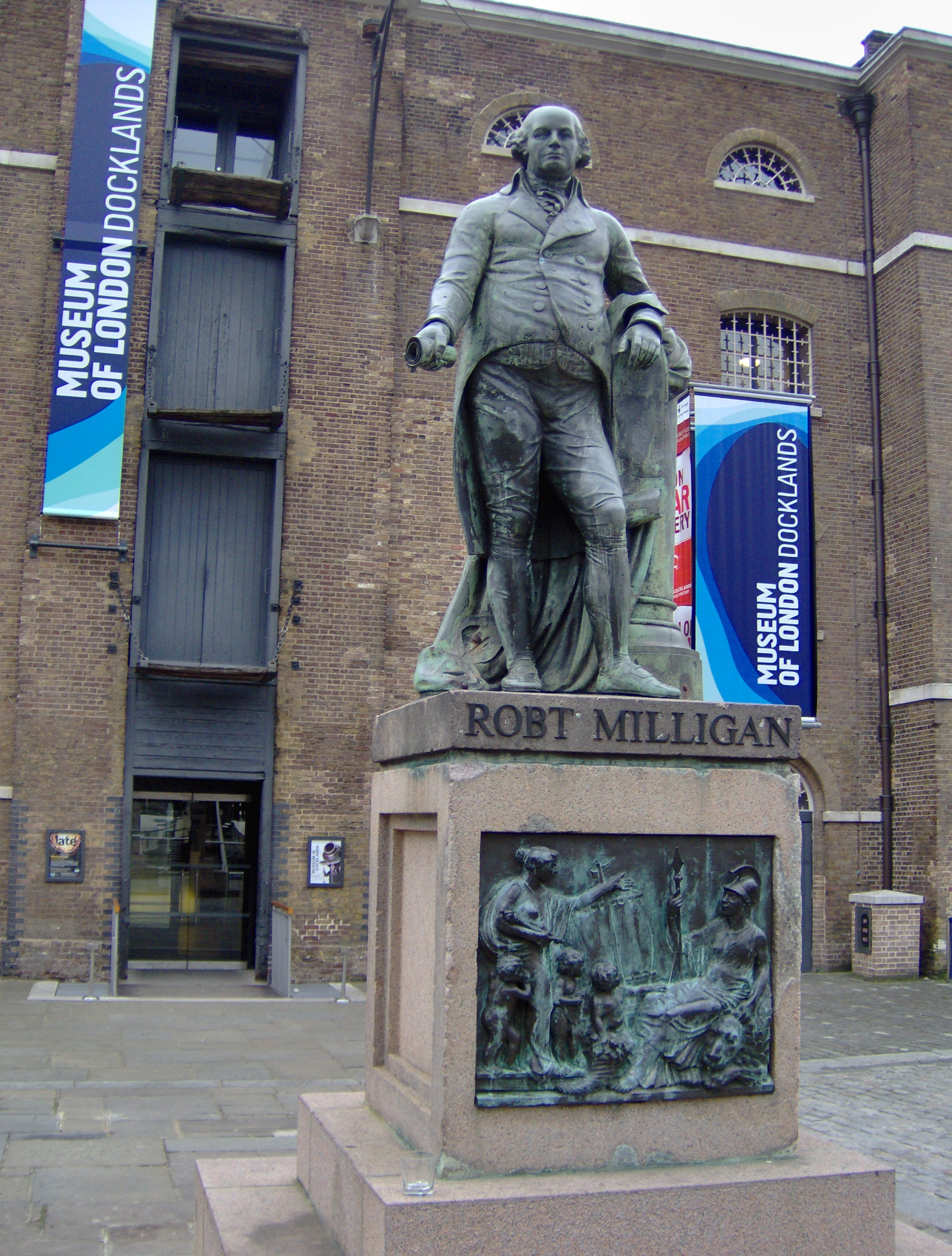
Museum of London Docklands

- Island History Trust
- Museum of London Docklands
- Ragged School Museum
- V&A Museum of Childhood
- Whitechapel Art Gallery
- Vagina Museum

== Transport ==
=== Road ===
As with most of the transport network in Tower Hamlets, several roads radiate across the Borough from the City of London. East–west routes include:

- the A11, which runs from Aldgate to the A12 near Stratford, passing through Whitechapel, Mile End, and Bow.
- the A13 (Commercial Road/East India Dock Road), which runs from Aldgate to Poplar. East of Poplar, the route continues towards Barking, Tilbury, and Southend.
- the A1203 (The Highway), which runs from Tower Hill, through Wapping, to Limehouse and Canary Wharf.

There are several north–south routes in the Borough, including:

- the A12, which begins at the A13 in Poplar and runs along the eastern edge of the Borough. The route carries traffic towards the M11 (for Stansted Airport), Romford, and destinations in Essex, including Chelmsford and Harwich International Port. The route ultimately runs to Lowestoft in Suffolk.
- the London Inner Ring Road from Old Street to Tower Bridge.

There are three River Thames road crossings in the Borough. From west-east, these are:

- Tower Bridge (Tower Hill to Southwark and Bermondsey)
- Rotherhithe Tunnel (the A13 at Limehouse to Canada Water)
- Blackwall Tunnel (the A12 and A13 at Poplar to Greenwich)

=== Rail ===
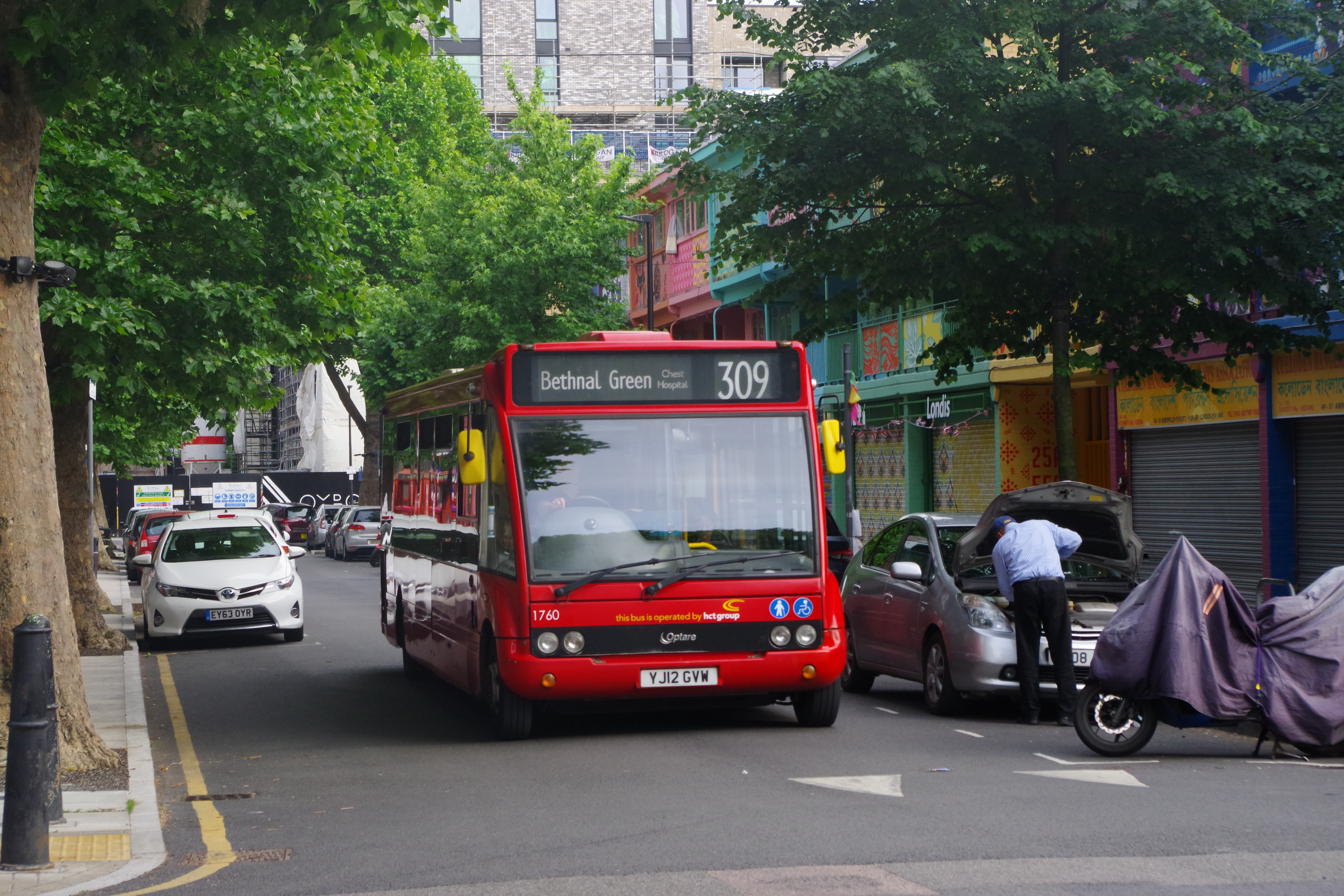
Bus on route 309 in Poplar.

The principal rail services commence in the City at Fenchurch Street, with one stop at Limehouse; and Liverpool Street, with stops at Bethnal Green and Cambridge Heath. The Windrush line passes from north to south through Tower Hamlets with stations at Whitechapel, Shadwell and Wapping. One entrance to Shoreditch High Street station is inside the Borough. And the Mildmay line passes the very north in Tower Hamlets with one entrance to Hackney Wick inside the Borough. Since 2022, the Elizabeth line has two stops at Whitechapel and Canary Wharf.

=== Metro ===
The Docklands Light Railway was built to serve the docklands areas of the borough, with a principal terminus at Bank and Tower Gateway. An interchange at Poplar allows trains to proceed north to Stratford, south via Canary Wharf towards Lewisham, and east either via the London City Airport to Woolwich Arsenal or via ExCeL London to Beckton.

Three London Underground services cross the district, serving a total of 8 stations: the District and Hammersmith and City lines share track between Aldgate East and Barking. The Central line has stations at Bethnal Green and Mile End - where there is an interchange to the District line. The Jubilee line has one stop at Canary Wharf.

=== List of stations ===
- Aldgate East tube station
- All Saints DLR station
- Bethnal Green railway station
- Bethnal Green tube station
- Blackwall DLR station
- Bow Church station
- Bow Road tube station
- Bromley-by-Bow tube station
- Cambridge Heath railway station
- Canary Wharf DLR station
- Canary Wharf railway station
- Canary Wharf tube station
- Crossharbour DLR station
- Devons Road DLR station
- East India DLR station
- Hackney Wick railway station
- Heron Quays DLR station
- Island Gardens DLR station
- Langdon Park DLR station
- Limehouse station (Rail and DLR)
- Mile End station
- Mudchute DLR station
- Poplar DLR station
- Shadwell railway station
- Shadwell DLR station
- Shoreditch High Street railway station
- South Quay DLR station
- Stepney Green tube station
- Tower Gateway DLR station
- Tower Hill tube station
- Wapping railway station
- West India Quay DLR station
- Westferry DLR station
- Whitechapel station

In March 2011, the main forms of transport that residents used to travel to work were: underground, light rail, 24.0% of all residents aged 16–74; on foot, 7.5%; bus, minibus or coach, 7.5%; driving a car or van, 6.9%; bicycle, 4.1%; train, 3.8%; work mainly at or from home, 2.3%.

Tower Hamlets Borough Council operates a walking bus service for school pupils on agreed routes with some running every school day while and others once or twice a week depending on the number of adult volunteers involved.

== Coat of arms ==
The coat of arms of the Borough of Tower Hamlets was granted by the College of Arms in 1965 and is composed of elements representing the maritime trades and heritage of the area. The strong links to the former manor and ancient parish of Stepney and to St Dunstan's church in Stepney known as the Church of the High Seas are represented. The manor and parish did not have a coat of arms but the (smaller) subsequent Metropolitan Borough of Stepney did, and elements from that have been incorporated into the current design.

The shield features:

- A ship, representing the maritime trades.
- A sprig of mulberry and a weaver's shuttle, representing the silk and other weaving activities once so important to the borough. The use of mulberry also honours the Huguenot refugees who first brought silk weaving to Tower Hamlets, and to England generally. Many council staff wear mulberry coloured (claret\maroon) uniforms. The weaving and textile industry (colloquially "the Rag Trade") is also commemorated in the name of the Weaver Line which passes through the borough.
- Blacksmith's fire tongs, the emblem of St Dunstan, the patron saint of Stepney, who had close ties to the area. Dunstan famously grabbed the devil by the nose with his tongs when he tried to tempt Dunstan.

The crest features:

- A silver representation of the (originally whitewashed) White Tower of the Tower of London, to which the original Tower Hamlets (or Tower division) was intimately linked.
- Crossed gold anchors, again representing the area's position in the Port of London.

Supporters:

- A seahorse, representing the maritime trades.
- A talbot dog, representing the Isle of Dogs.

Motto: From great things to greater, an anglicised version of the Latin motto on the arms of the Metropolitan Borough of Stepney.

The council's logo is used as an alternative to the coat of arms. It features a simplified White Tower, above a stylised representation of the Thames. This was a development of the previous logo of the White Tower, in mulberry and presented in a three-tower form, as if seen from certain quarters which obscured the furthest corner tower—and a geographically accurate representation of the local part of the Thames. This older version is still seen on many street signs.

== Freedom of the Borough ==
The following people and military units have received the Freedom of the Borough of Tower Hamlets.

=== Individuals ===
- Commander John Ludgate: 25 May 2018.

=== Military units ===
- HMS Crane, RN: 1942.
- 114 (1st London) Army Engineer Regiment (TA): 27 April 1961.

== See also ==
- List of public art in the London Borough of Tower Hamlets
- Mayor of Tower Hamlets
- Tower Hamlets London Borough Council
