= Mile End Park =

Park in Bethnal Green, London

Coordinates: 51°31′34″N 0°2′15″W

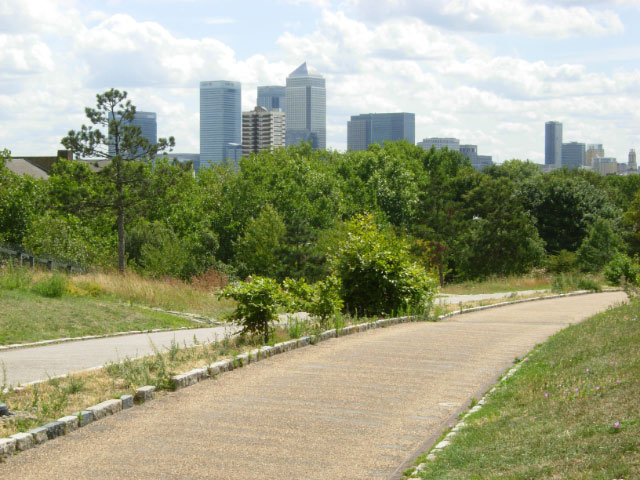
Mile End Park

Mile End Park is a park located in the London Borough of Tower Hamlets. It is a linear park of some 32 hectares (79 acres), and was created on industrial land devastated by World War II bombing, with the park lying on land to the east of the Regent's Canal. In the north, it is separated from the southern edge of Victoria Park by the Hertford Union Canal. It is open 24 hours a day.

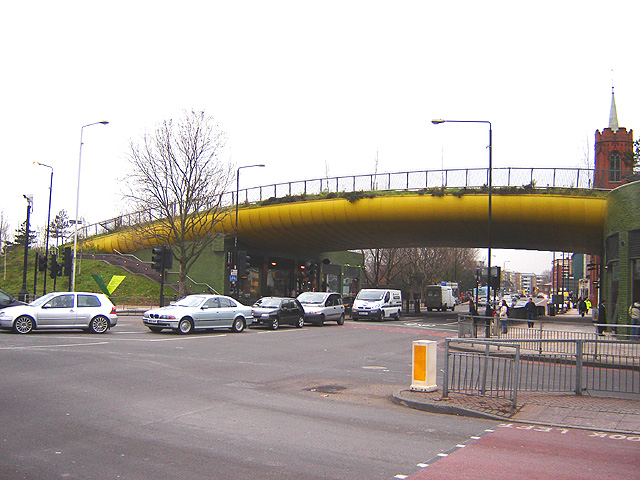
The Green Bridge carries Mile End Park over the Mile End Road

A plan existed from the end of the war to create the park, but extensive development did not begin until the end of the millennium. A pedestrian bridge, opened in July 1999, was built over the Mile End Road, which bisects the park, near Mile End tube station. The bridge was designed by Piers Gough. Prior to the park's construction, 193 Grove Road - at the edge of the park - was transformed by sculptor Rachel Whiteread into a cast of its interior. This work won her the Turner Prize in 1993.

In 1381, 60,000 Men of Essex camped here and met Richard II at Mile End, on 14 June 1381, during the Peasants' Revolt.

The park now consists of a number of elements (running north–south): The Play Arena - for children, The Ecology Park - including a lake, an ecology building, wind turbine and climbing wall, The Arts Park, The Green Bridge, The Terraced Garden, The South Park, Adventure Park, Sports Park - including the Mile End stadium, Kirk's Place and The Children's Park. Nearby are an extreme sports centre and an electric Go kart track.

The Ragged School Museum opened in 1990 in three canal side former warehouses in Copperfield Road. It faces the western edge of the park south of Mile End Road. The buildings previously housed Dr Barnado's Copperfield Road Ragged School.

The park has been awarded the London First Award, the Green bridge the Institution of Civil Engineers Award of Merit, a commendation at the British Construction Industry Awards and a special commendation from the Prime Minister's Award.

The park has an active Friends group.

== Mile End Stadium ==
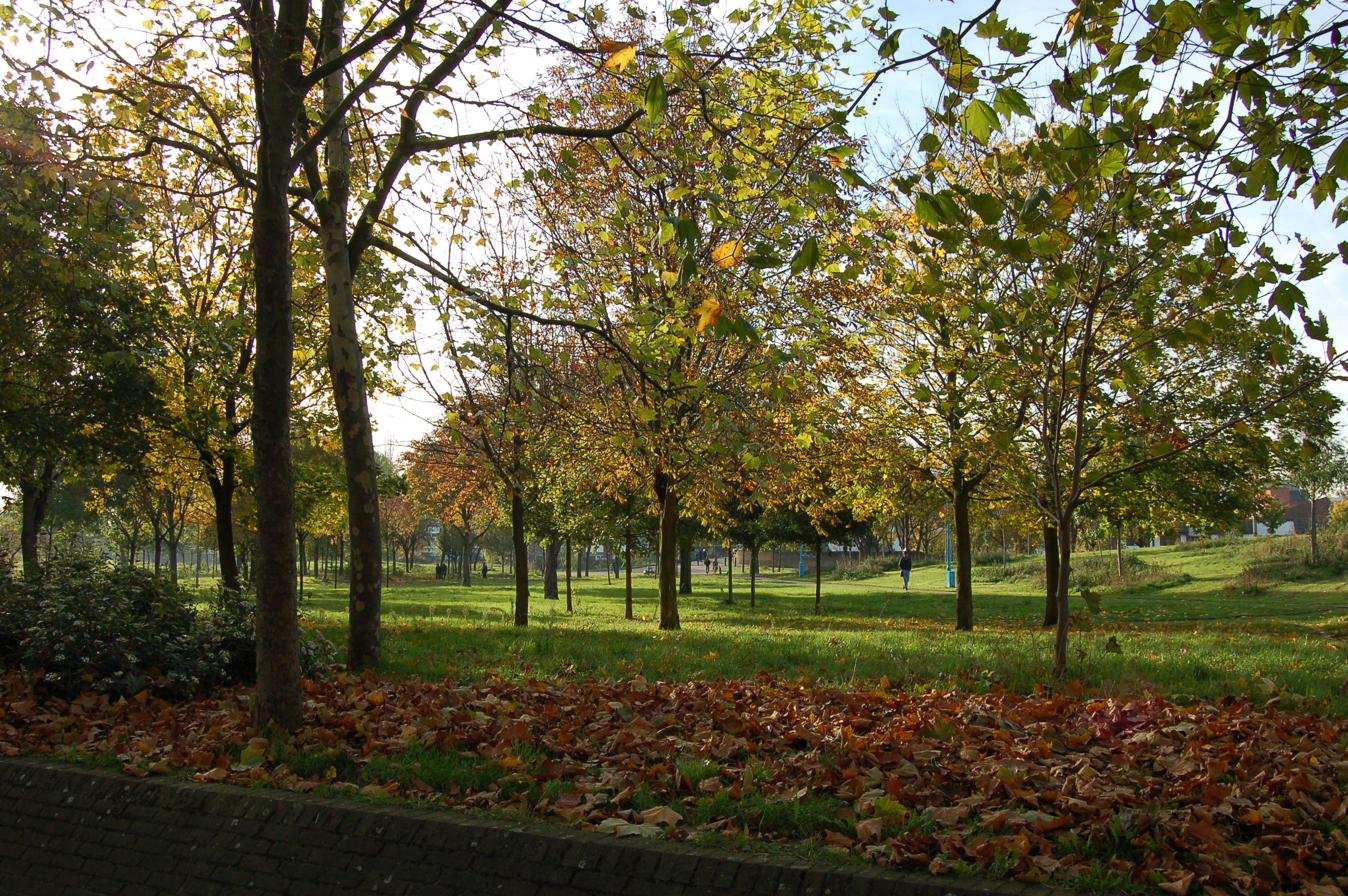
Mile End Park

Mile End Stadium, situated at the south end of the park, underwent refurbishment which was completed in 2005. A new sport and fitness centre, the Mile End Park Leisure Centre was built adjacent to the Stadium and opened in 2006. It houses a four- court sports hall, two swimming pools (including one competition standard pool), state-of-the-art fitness studios, and a health suite and sauna.

The Mile End Climbing Wall is also located in Mile End Park.
