= Grove Hall Park =

Park in Bow, London, England

Coordinates: 51°31′47″N 0°01′05″W

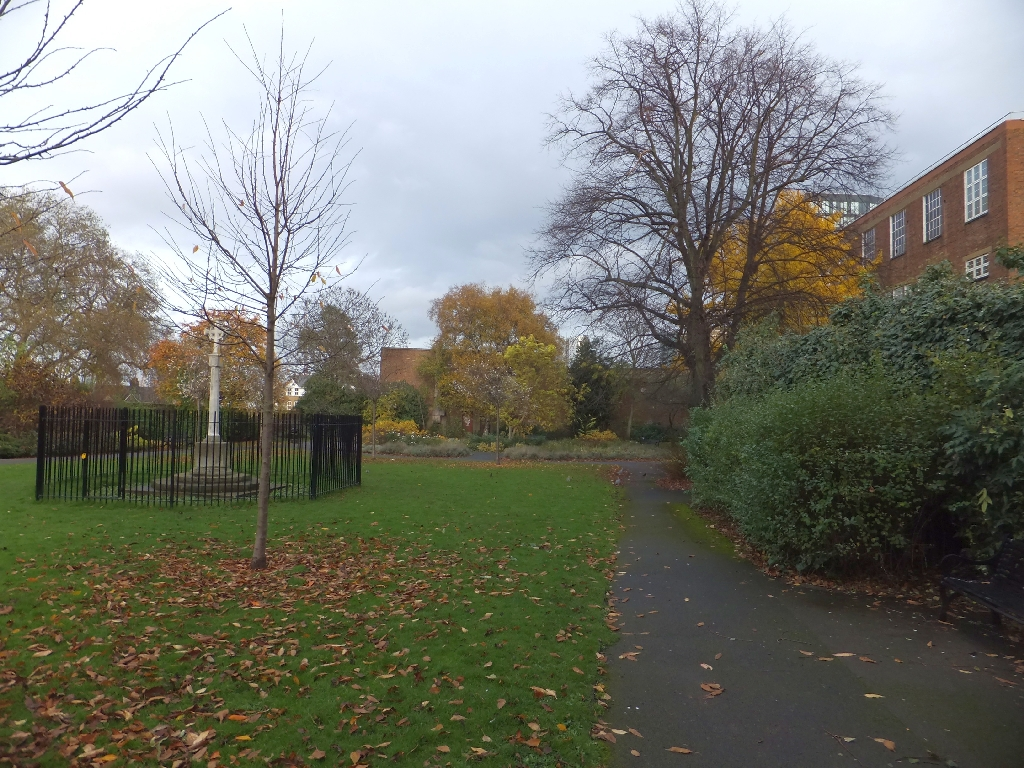
Grove Hall Park

Grove Hall Park is a 1.19 ha public park in Bow in the London Borough of Tower Hamlets, East London. It includes play areas, a ball games area, and a small walled memorial garden.

Grove Hall Park was opened as a public park in 1909 following its purchase by the Metropolitan Borough of Poplar in an auction in 1906. Previously the land had been in the possession of the Byas family, who had established Grove Hall Private Lunatic Asylum on the plot in 1820. This establishment primarily catered for ex-servicemen and was featured in Charles Dickens' novel Nicholas Nickleby (1839). In 1878 it was the largest asylum in London with capacity for 443 inmates.

In 1930 the park was extended with land that had served as the garden for the St Catherine's Convent, Bow. The former convent Church of Our Lady and St Catherine of Siena, which opened in 1870, survives in Bow Road, but the Dominican convent itself moved to Stone, Staffordshire, in 1926.

== External resources ==
- Photographs of Grove Hall Park in summer. Retrieved 4 July 2014.
- A description of Grove Hall in 1898, when it was still a lunatic asylum. Retrieved 4 July 2014.
