= Social Streets =

Local newspaper in Tower Hamlets, London

Social Streets is a community interest company and local news organisation in Tower Hamlets, London, England. It was founded by Tabitha Stapely in 2018.

Between 2018 and 2025, Social Streets ran four digital newspapers, each focusing on a different part of Tower Hamlets: Roman Road LDN, Whitechapel LDN, Poplar LDN, and Bethnal Green LDN.

In October 2025, Social Streets merged its four hyperlocal news titles into one borough-wide online newspaper called Tower Hamlets Slice, covering the entirety of Tower Hamlets.

It also publishes a biannual physical newspaper called The Slice, later renamed Tower Hamlets Slice, and runs a range of journalism training courses.

Social Streets is a social enterprise that was incubated at the Cambridge Judge Business School in 2017.

Its founder Stapely has lobbied the government for better support for local publishers, and has spoken about the need for an advertising model designed to support both the local economy and local journalism.
