= Mile End Stadium =

Sports venue in Mile End, London, England

Coordinates: 51°31′09″N 0°02′00″W

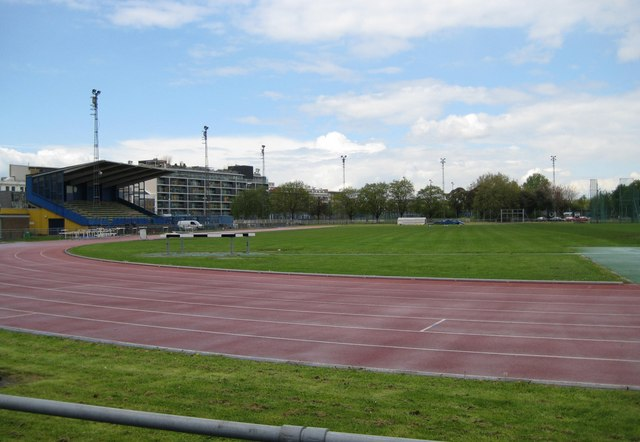

- Location within London Borough of Tower Hamlets
- Location: Mile End, London
- Capacity: 2,000 (439 seated)
- Public transit: Mile End

Construction
- Opened: 9 September 1990

Tenants
- Tower Hamlets; Sporting Bengal United

Mile End Stadium, also known as the East London Stadium, is a multi-sports stadium in Mile End and situated in the park of the same name in the East End of London, England. The stadium comprises an athletics stadium and a number of floodlit Astroturf football pitches, tennis and netball courts.

The new sports complex with a 25m swimming pool was refurbished in 2019.

The stadium is home to Sporting Bengal United F.C. and Tower Hamlets F.C. of the Eastern Counties Football League, and was formerly home to Leyton Orient Women of the FA Women's National League from 2004 to 2021.

It hosted a concert by Britpop band Blur on 17 June 1995, where 27,000 fans saw the band supported by The Boo Radleys, Sparks, John Shuttleworth, Dodgy and Cardiacs.

== Transport ==
Mile End Stadium is served by London Buses Routes 277, 309, 323, D6, D7 and Night Route N277, and nearby Mile End is served by routes 25, 205, 339, 425 and Night Routes N25 and N205.

To the north, Mile End tube station is located nearby across Mile End Park for Central line, District line and Hammersmith & City line services. To the south, the stadium is a short walk from Limehouse DLR station for Docklands Light Railway and c2c services.

Cycle Superhighway CS2 passes close by on Mile End Road.

The Regent's Canal passes close by, and offers access to walk or cycle on the towpath. Victoria Park, Globe Town and Limehouse Basin can be reached easily from here via the towpath.
