= List of schools in the London Borough of Tower Hamlets =

This is a list of schools in the London Borough of Tower Hamlets, England.

== State-funded schools ==
=== Primary schools ===
- Arnhem Wharf Primary School
- Bangabandhu Primary School
- Ben Jonson Primary School
- Bigland Green Primary School
- Blue Gate Fields Infants' School
- Blue Gate Fields Junior School
- Bonner Primary School
- Bygrove Primary School
- Canary Wharf College East Ferry
- Canary Wharf College Glenworth
- Cayley Primary School
- Chisenhale Primary School
- Christ Church CE School
- The Clara Grant Primary School
- Columbia Primary School
- Cubitt Town Primary School
- Culloden Primary
- Cyril Jackson Primary School
- Elizabeth Selby Infants' School
- English Martyrs RC Primary School
- Globe Primary School
- Hague Primary School
- Halley Primary School
- Harbinger Primary School
- Harry Gosling Primary School
- Hermitage Primary School
- John Scurr Primary School
- Kobi Nazrul Primary School
- Lansbury Lawrence School
- Lawdale Junior School
- Malmesbury Primary School
- Manorfield Primary School
- Marion Richardson Primary School
- Marner Primary School
- Mayflower Primary School
- Mowlem Primary School
- Mulberry Canon Barnett Primary
- Mulberry Wood Wharf Primary
- Old Ford Primary
- Old Palace Primary School
- Olga Primary School
- Osmani Primary School
- Our Lady and St Joseph RC School
- Redlands Primary School
- St Agnes RC Primary School
- St Anne's and Guardian Angels RC Primary School
- St Edmund's RC School
- St Elizabeth RC Primary School
- St John's CE Primary School
- St Luke's CE Primary School
- St Mary and St Michael Primary School
- St Paul's Way Trust School
- St Paul's Way Primary School
- St Paul with St Luke CE Primary School
- St Paul's Whitechapel CE Primary School
- St Peter's London Docks CE Primary School
- St Saviour's CE Primary School
- Seven Mills Primary School
- Sir William Burrough Primary School
- Solebay Primary
- Stebon Primary School
- Stepney Greencoat CE Primary School
- Stepney Park Primary School
- Stewart Headlam Primary School
- Thomas Buxton Primary School
- Virginia Primary School
- Wellington Primary School
- William Davis Primary School
- Woolmore Primary School

=== Secondary schools ===
- Bishop Challoner Catholic School
- Bow School
- Canary Wharf Secondary
- Central Foundation Girls' School
- George Green's School
- Langdon Park School
- London Enterprise Academy
- Morpeth School
- Mulberry Academy London Dock
- Mulberry Academy Shoreditch
- Mulberry School for Girls
- Mulberry Stepney Green Maths, Computing and Science College
- Mulberry UTC
- Oaklands School
- Stepney All Saints School
- St Paul's Way Trust School
- Swanlea School
- Wapping High School

=== Special and alternative schools ===
- Beatrice Tate School
- Bowden House School
- Ian Mikardo School
- London East Alternative Provision
- Phoenix School
- South Quay College
- Stephen Hawking School

=== Further education ===
- Ada, the National College for Digital Skills
- East London Arts & Music
- St Paul's Way Sixth Form
- Tower Hamlets College
- Workers' Educational Association

== Independent schools ==
=== Primary and preparatory schools ===
- Al-Mizan School
- Buttercup Primary School
- Date Palm Primary School
- Faraday School
- Gatehouse School

=== Senior and all-through schools ===
- Darul Hadis Latifiah
- Jamiatul Ummah School
- London East Academy
- London Islamic School
- Madani Girls' School
- Mazahirul Uloom London School
- River House Montessori School

=== Special and alternative schools ===
- Brick Lane School
- The Complete Works Independent School

== Universities ==
London Interdisciplinary School

- Jack Petchey Foundation

Queen Mary, University of London

- University Of Cumbria In London
