= Ashley Cole =

English footballer (born 1980)

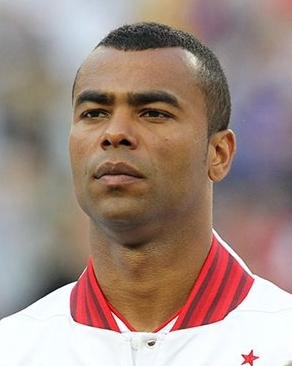
- Cole with England at Euro 2012

Personal information
- Full name: Ashley Cole
- Date of birth: 20 December 1980 (age 45)
- Place of birth: Stepney, England
- Height: 5 ft 9 in (1.76 m)
- Position: Left-back

Youth career
- 1997–1999: Arsenal

Senior career*
Years	Team	Apps	(Gls)
1999–2006	Arsenal	156	(8)
2000	→ Crystal Palace (loan)	14	(1)
2006–2014	Chelsea	229	(7)
2014–2016	Roma	11	(0)
2016–2018	LA Galaxy	89	(3)
2019	Derby County	9	(0)
Total		508	(19)

International career
1999	England U20	2	(0)
2002	England U21	5	(1)
2001–2014	England	107	(0)

Managerial career
- 2026: Cesena
- * Club domestic league appearances and goals

Ashley Cole (born 20 December 1980) is an English professional football coach and former player. As a player, he played as a left-back, most notably for Arsenal and Chelsea. Cole is considered one of the best defenders of his generation, one of the greatest English players of all time as well as one of the greatest left-backs in the history of the sport.

Born in Stepney, London, Cole began his youth career at Arsenal and made his full debut for the club in November 1999, going on to make 228 appearances and scoring nine goals for the North London club. With Arsenal he won two Premier League titles, three FA Cups, and was an integral member of the "Invincibles" team of the 2003–04 season, who went the entire league season undefeated. Cole also made an appearance in Arsenal's first UEFA Champions League final in 2006; the club lost 2–1 to Barcelona.

In August 2006, after a protracted transfer saga, Cole completed a move to rival club Chelsea, with whom he won further honours, including the Premier League in the 2009–10 season, four FA Cups, one Football League Cup and one UEFA Champions League. He was released by Chelsea at the end of the 2013–14 season. With seven winners' medals, Cole has won the FA Cup more times than any other player in history, and is one of two players to have won the Double with two clubs, along with Nicolas Anelka.

Cole was an England international from 2001 to 2014, playing at the 2002, 2006 and 2010 World Cups, as well as Euro 2004 and Euro 2012. He was voted England Player of the Year in 2010. When he retired from international football in 2014, he had won 107 caps, making him England's most-capped full-back.

After retirement, Cole immediately went into coaching, and has served as an assistant coach under former teammates Frank Lampard and Wayne Rooney at various clubs, as well as under Lee Carsley with the England U21 national team. From March to June 2026, he was the head coach of Serie B club Cesena.

== Early life ==
Cole's father, Ron Callender, is from Barbados. He left the family after seven years of marriage and later moved to Australia. Cole and his younger brother Matthew were brought up by their mother Sue Cole, going to Bow School in Tower Hamlets.

== Club career ==
=== Arsenal: 1999–2006 ===
Cole started his career by joining his local club, Arsenal, whom he had supported as a child. At the age of 18, on 30 November 1999, he made his first-team debut in the League Cup fourth round against Middlesbrough; Arsenal lost 1–3 on penalties after the match ended 2–2 at the end of extra time at the Riverside Stadium. On 25 February 2000, he signed his first professional contract. His Premier League debut came on 14 May 2000 against Newcastle United, as part of an experimental side that lost 4–2 away on the final day of the season. Before he fully broke into the Arsenal side, he spent part of the 1999–2000 season on loan at Crystal Palace, where he played 14 league matches and scored one goal, a long-range half-volley against Blackburn Rovers. When Sylvinho, Arsenal's established left-back, suffered an injury in the autumn of the 2000–01 season, Cole took the opportunity to establish himself in the first team and remained first-choice even after the Brazilian's recovery.

With Arsenal, he won the FA Premier League twice (in 2002 and 2004), and the FA Cup three times (in 2002, 2003 and 2005, scoring in the penalty shootout in the final of the latter). Although injured for much of the 2005–06 season, he recovered in time to play in Arsenal's UEFA Champions League final defeat to Barcelona at the end of the season. In total he made 228 first-team appearances for the Gunners, scoring nine goals.

Cole had a very good season in 2004–05. He was a regular at left-back for both England and Arsenal despite Gaël Clichy's claim for a place in the first-team squad. Cole scored his first goal of the season in the seventh game in a tough trip to Manchester City in which he scored the opening and only goal to give Arsenal an important win. He scored his second goal in a 3–1 away win to Aston Villa, scoring Arsenal's third in only the 28th minute.

=== Transfer saga: 2005–2006 ===
Cole was found guilty of making contact with league rivals Chelsea over a possible move, without informing Arsenal. He was fined £100,000 by the Premier League on 2 June 2005 for a tapping-up meeting at a hotel in January 2005. Cole, his agent Jonathan Barnett, the Chelsea manager José Mourinho and chief executive Peter Kenyon, and agent Pini Zahavi were present at the meeting. An appeal in August 2005 did not reject the guilty verdict, but his fine was reduced to £75,000. Chelsea were also fined £300,000 and Mourinho was fined £200,000, reduced on appeal in August 2005 to £75,000. Barnett's licence was suspended for 18 months and he was also fined £100,000.

On 18 July 2005, Cole signed a one-year extension to his contract with Arsenal, but just a year later departed from the club in acrimonious circumstances. On 15 July 2006, Cole launched a verbal attack on Arsenal; in his autobiography, he claimed that the Arsenal board had treated him as a "scapegoat" and that they had "fed him to the sharks" over the tapping-up affair while Arsenal, from their part, insisted that they were legally obliged to punish Cole for his illegal contact with Chelsea. Cole was deliberately left out of Arsenal's 2006–07 team photograph, fuelling press speculation that he would leave.

On 28 July 2006, Arsenal vice-chairman David Dein confirmed that Arsenal and Chelsea had been in "civil talks" about the player. Chelsea insisted they would not raise their £16 million bid for Cole, but Arsenal held out for at a higher valuation of £25 million. Negotiations continued throughout August and looked to be heading for deadlock, but eventually Cole signed for Chelsea on 31 August for a fee of £5 million, with William Gallas being transferred from Chelsea to Arsenal as part of the same deal. The deal was closed after the transfer window had officially ended, and was not confirmed until an hour and a half after the deadline had passed. The move angered Arsenal fans, who dubbed him "Cashley" and waved fake £20 notes with Cole's face on them at him when the two clubs faced each other on 10 December 2006.

Arsenal had offered Cole a longer contract to stay at the club, but he had been left "trembling with anger" when they offered him wages of £55,000 per week. His wage increased to £120,000 a week when he signed a new contract in September 2009.

=== Chelsea: 2006–2014 ===
Cole was given the number 3 shirt at Chelsea, and made his first appearance for the club as a substitute for Wayne Bridge in their 2–1 win over Charlton Athletic on 9 September. He issued a public statement concerning his transfer saying he "forgave" Arsenal for how he felt he was treated during his time there.

On 31 January 2007, Cole suffered a serious knee injury in the 3–0 victory over Blackburn Rovers in a Premier League game at Stamford Bridge, although after a scan it was revealed to be not as bad as first thought, with Chelsea optimistic that he would return before the end of the 2006–07 season. Cole made his return in a league match against Portsmouth in March, assisting both goals in a 2-0 win. He went onto play the last twelve minutes of the 2007 FA Cup final at the new Wembley Stadium against Manchester United. Chelsea emerged victorious 1–0 after extra-time with a goal scored by Didier Drogba, to win the 2007 FA Cup.

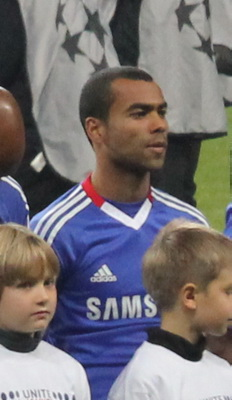
Cole lining up for a Champions League game at Spartak Moscow in October 2010

Cole was reportedly one of the players upset when José Mourinho was relieved of his position as Chelsea manager. He was dropped in favour of Wayne Bridge for the 2008 Football League Cup final, which Chelsea lost 2–1 to Tottenham Hotspur. However, Cole scored his first Chelsea goal in Chelsea's very next game, on 1 March 2008, the fourth goal in a 4–0 away victory against West Ham United. On 19 March 2008, Cole was involved in a controversial incident in a Premier League game against Tottenham at White Hart Lane where he performed a high tackle on Tottenham's Alan Hutton. Referee Mike Riley gave Cole a yellow card, a decision which was judged as too lenient by some analysts. Cole allegedly also "turned his back on the referee" and the episode renewed debate in the media over the game's rules on dissent towards officials.

After starting Chelsea's first six games in the league, Cole scored his third, fourth and fifth Chelsea goals at home to Burnley, Tottenham Hotspur and Sunderland respectively. On 2 September 2009, he signed a new four-year deal which will contract him to Chelsea until 2013. On 10 February 2010, he suffered a fractured left ankle in the 2–1 defeat against Everton that kept him out of action for three months. He eventually made his return against Stoke City, a game which Chelsea won 7–0. Cole scored a goal against Wigan Athletic on the last day of the Premier League in an 8–0 win as Chelsea claimed the title. He then played in the 2010 FA Cup final, where Chelsea beat Portsmouth to give Cole the second league and cup double of his career. He started all 38 league games for Chelsea in the 2010–11 season, and was awarded the Chelsea F.C. Player's Player of the Year award for the second time.

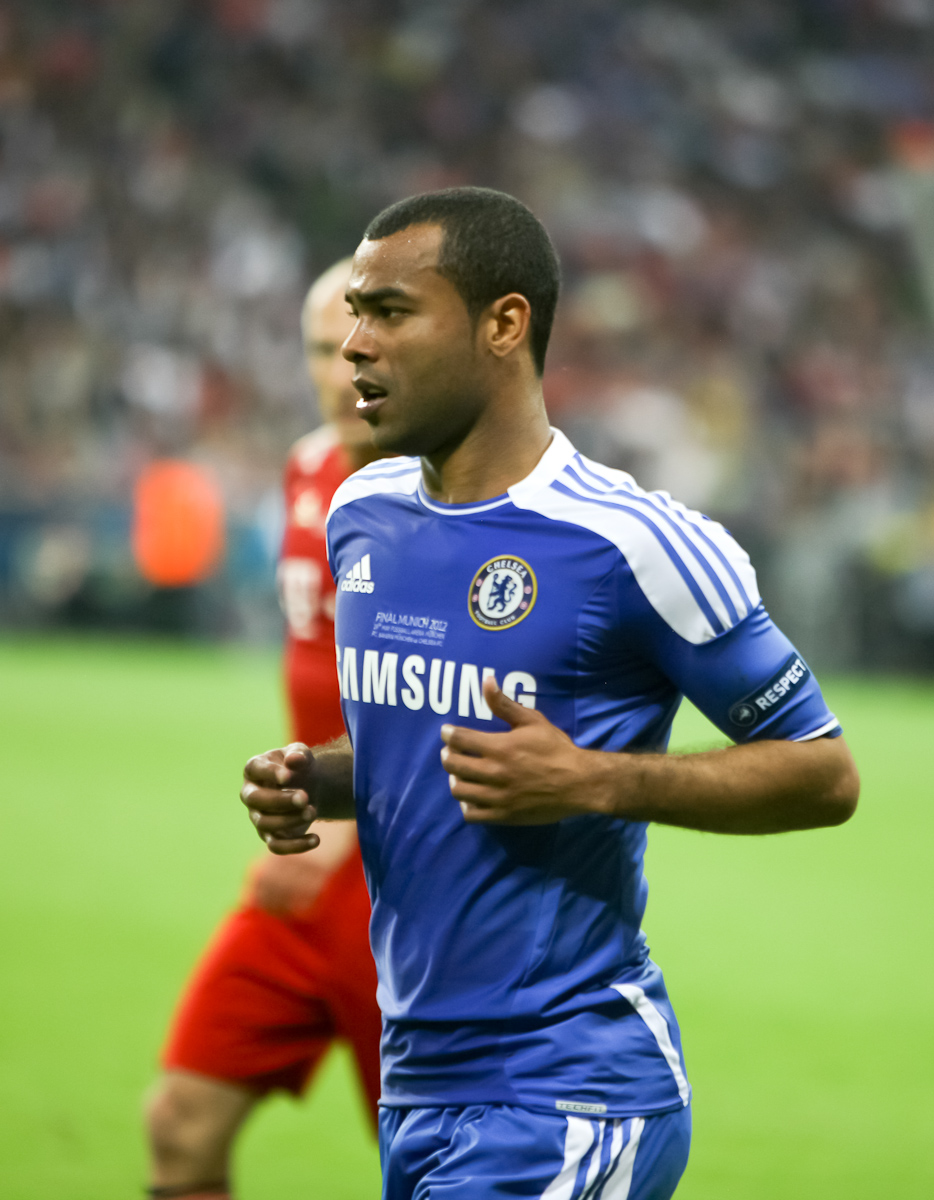
Cole playing for Chelsea during the 2012 UEFA Champions League final

In the 2011–12 season, Cole won the seventh FA Cup of his career after Chelsea beat Liverpool 2–1 in the 2012 FA Cup final. In the Champions League semi-final against Barcelona, Cole was pivotal in Chelsea's 1–0 victory which included a goal-line clearance that denied Barça an away goal. Cole also received praise for his role in the final against Bayern Munich on 19 May 2012, both for his defending and for scoring in the decisive penalty shoot-out as Chelsea won their first European title.

Cole scored his first goal for over two years against Stoke City on 22 September 2012, proving to be the winner. On 1 December 2012, Cole made his 350th Premier League appearance, in a 3–1 away loss to West Ham United.

On 22 January 2013, Cole signed a one-year extension to his contract with Chelsea. Cole again helped the club win a European title during the 2012–13 season, playing in a 2–1 victory over Benfica in the 2013 UEFA Europa League final on 15 May.

During the 2013–14 season, Cole was dropped from the Chelsea team, with César Azpilicueta replacing him as the club's first-choice left-back in the month of November. Cole captained the team on the last match day against Cardiff City in a 2–1 away win which turned out to be his last in a Chelsea shirt. On 23 May 2014, after the end of the season, he was included on the list of players released by Chelsea. Cole's contract expired on 30 June 2014.

=== Roma ===
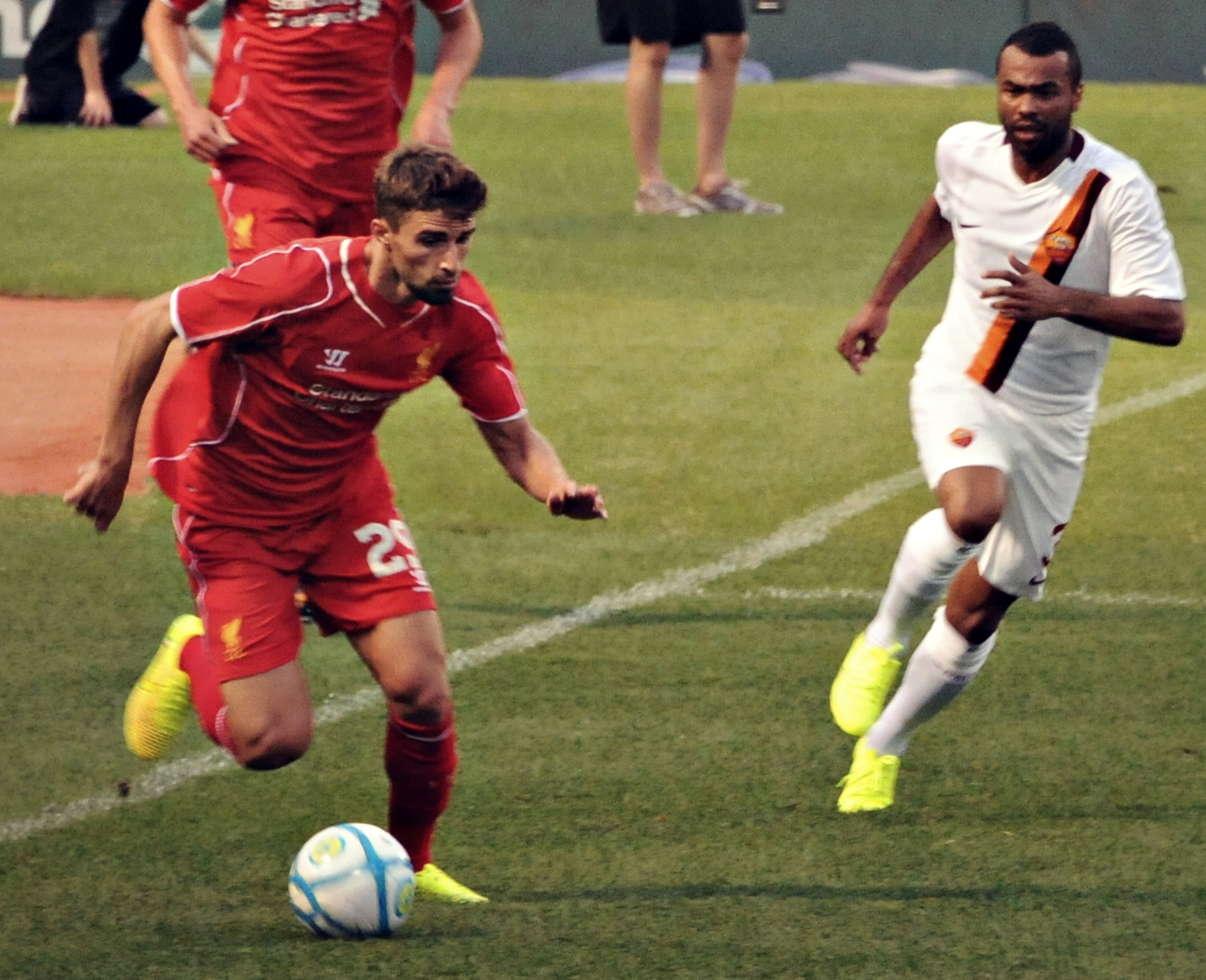
Cole defending for Roma against Liverpool in 2014

On 7 July 2014, Cole signed a two-year deal with Roma. He made his competitive debut on 30 August in their first game of the Serie A season, playing the full 90 minutes of a 2–0 win over Fiorentina at the Stadio Olimpico. On 19 January 2016, Cole terminated his contract with Roma with one year of his contract remaining.

=== LA Galaxy ===
Cole signed with LA Galaxy of Major League Soccer on 27 January 2016. On 24 February, he made his debut in a goalless home draw against Santos Laguna in the CONCACAF Champions League; on 6 March, he made his league debut in the first game of the 2016 season, playing the full 90 minutes of a 4–1 win over D.C. United at the StubHub Center. Manager Bruce Arena praised Cole and fellow veteran new signing Nigel de Jong after the result. On 1 May, he was sent off for a second booking in a 1–1 draw at Sporting Kansas City. Cole was ejected following a clumsy tackle on Benny Feilhaber after being cautioned just 32 seconds earlier. He received his second dismissal of the season on 25 June in the match against San Jose Earthquakes. Cole had been booked for a reckless tackle and as emotions were high, a melee ensued. The referee deemed Cole's reaction worthy of another booking and as a result he received his marching orders for the second time in eight league games.

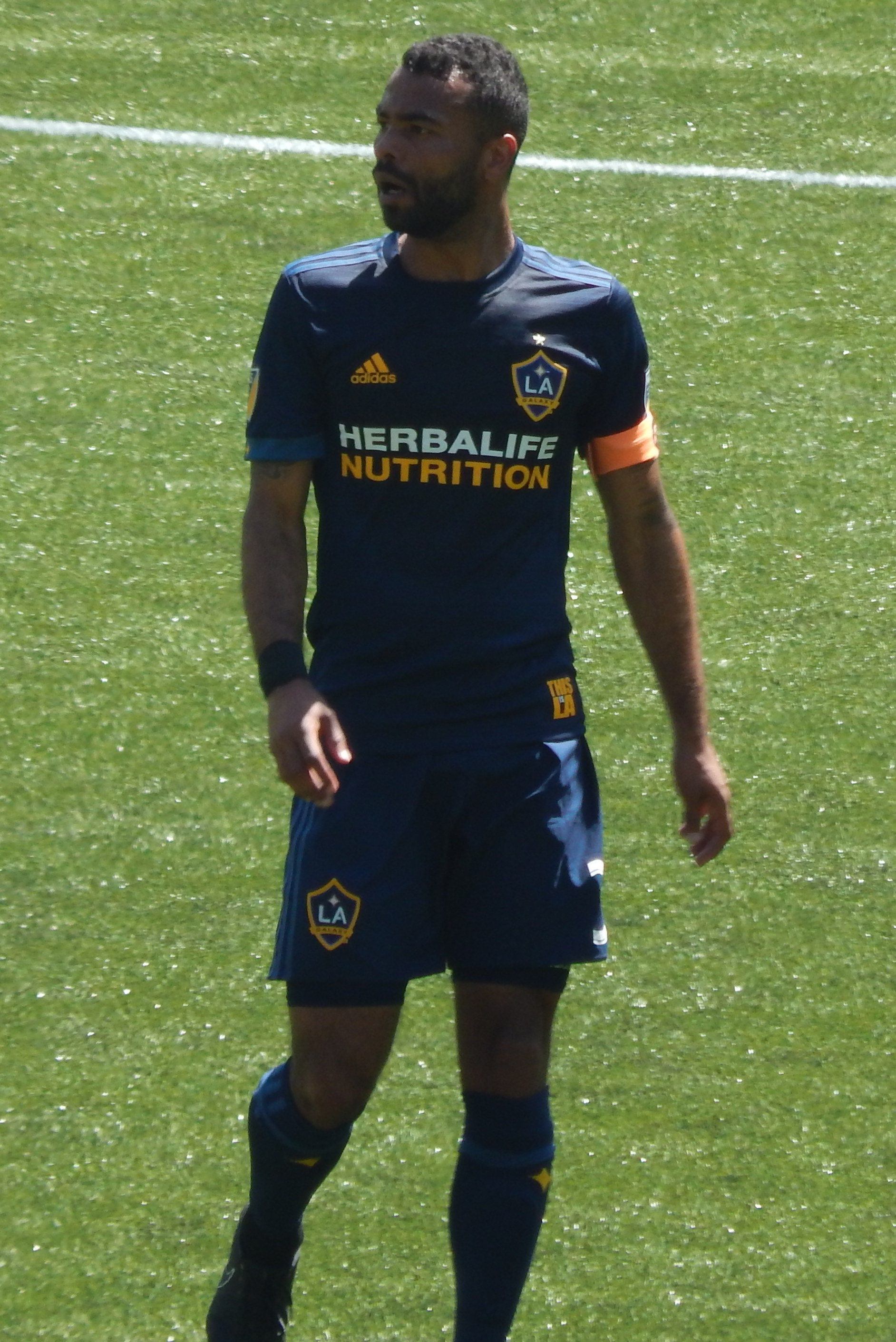
Cole with LA Galaxy in June 2018

On 7 August 2016, Cole scored his first goal for the Galaxy, a last-minute equaliser in a 2–2 home draw against the New York Red Bulls. His team qualified for the 2016 MLS Cup Playoffs, where they lost the Western Conference semi-finals to the Colorado Rapids on penalties. Cole's attempt was saved by Colorado goalkeeper Tim Howard, and after the game he apologised publicly to his long-time England teammate Steven Gerrard, who was playing his final professional match for the Galaxy that night.

In his second season in California, Cole saw another red card on 23 August 2017 after 18 minutes of a 2–0 loss at Columbus Crew SC for a foul on Pedro Santos. He played 29 matches for the Galaxy, scoring once in a 6–2 home loss to Real Salt Lake, as the team came dead last and missed out on the play-offs for the first time since 2008.

Head coach Sigi Schmid named Cole as captain ahead of the 2018 season. The Galaxy missed the play-offs again. He was released by LA Galaxy at the end of their 2018 season.

=== Derby County ===
On 21 January 2019, Cole joined Championship side Derby County, reuniting with manager Frank Lampard who was his teammate at Chelsea and with England. He signed a contract until the end of the 2018–19 season. He was released at the end of the season. On 18 August 2019, Cole officially announced his retirement.

== International career ==
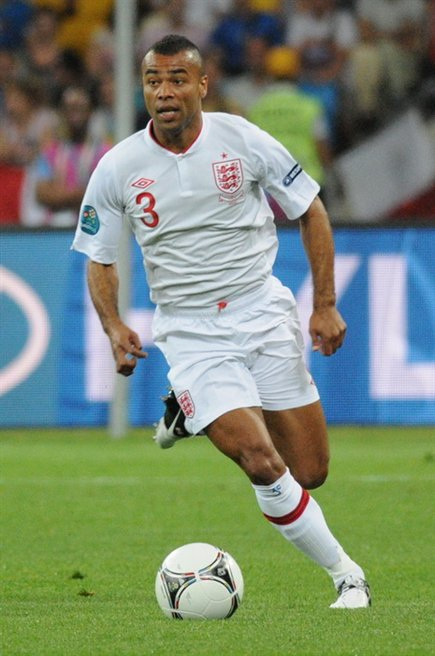
Cole playing for England at UEFA Euro 2012

Cole has played for England at youth and senior levels. He was capped for the England U-20 team at the 1999 FIFA World Youth Championship alongside Stuart Taylor, Peter Crouch, Andrew Johnson and Matthew Etherington. However, the team finished bottom of their group, suffering three defeats without scoring any goals. He also made four appearances for England under-21s, scoring once.

After just four appearances for the Under-21s, Cole was fast-tracked into the England senior team and Sven-Göran Eriksson handed Cole his senior international debut against Albania, on 28 March 2001. He played for England at the 2002, 2006 and 2010 FIFA World Cups, UEFA Euro 2004 (where he was named as one of four England players in the all-star squad for the tournament) and UEFA Euro 2012.

Cole was also an ever-present for England in the 2006 World Cup; in their second round match against Ecuador he made a crucial block, deflecting Carlos Tenorio's shot onto the crossbar. The match ended with England winning 1–0, but the team were knocked out on penalties by Portugal in the quarter-finals. By the end of 2008, Cole had achieved 68 caps for England, all of which were starting appearances.

He made his 79th appearance for England on 12 June 2010 in the 1–1 draw against the United States in the 2010 World Cup Group stage match. He beat the record of 79 caps by a black English international (John Barnes, who appeared for England from 1983 to 1995) when he played against Algeria later that month. He has played more internationals without scoring than any other outfield player in England history. He won his 86th cap against Montenegro in October 2010, and alongside Kenny Sansom, Cole is now England's most-capped full-back in history, an achievement which helped him pick up the England Player of the Year award for 2010, as voted for by fans. On 6 February 2013, he earned his 100th cap as England beat Brazil 2–1 at Wembley.

On 11 May 2014, he announced his retirement from international football after being omitted from the England squad for the 2014 FIFA World Cup.

== Style of play ==
He is a defender who simply loves to attack. Defends, because he has to defend and because it is part of his job. Everybody loves to play with [him] because as soon as you won the ball back, he was up there to attack.

— Arsène Wenger

Cole's game incorporates an attacking approach to his play, which supports his teams' forward play. As a youth, he "always liked scoring goals and attacking", but grew to love the role of defending, as being a left-back was the only opportunity of breaking into the seniors. Prior to his inclusion in the Arsenal first team, Cole studied the conduct of fellow defender Nigel Winterburn to improve his play; Winterburn concurrently offered pointers to improve his positioning. He modelled his game on Brazilian Roberto Carlos: "He's got natural talent, but I think if you train hard enough you can be nearly as good as that."

Liam Brady described Cole as a player with "great character and determination" and his former teammate Sylvinho noted that one of Cole's qualities was being competent: "Ashley does not need people saying, 'Do this' or 'Go there'. He knows, he knows." The rapid progress made by Cole in his debut season for Arsenal "surprised" Wenger and prompted him to make the defender his first pick. Sylvinho, the player displaced, commented that Wenger's belief in Cole helped him to develop as a player: "He spoke to [Cole] and said: 'After Silvinho you can play left-back. You are one of the best left-backs at the club and one day will be one of the best in the world.'" Cole's link-up play with winger Robert Pires and main striker Thierry Henry in a 4–4–2 formation effectively made him "a wing-back or winger playing in a back four" because Arsenal's game emphasised attacking football.

Under José Mourinho at Chelsea, Cole's attacking threat was restrained, meaning it allowed the player to focus more on defending and marking. This was a "side of his game" Cole improved the most according to Winterburn, given he was criticised in the past for being caught out of position. The arrival of Luiz Felipe Scolari however ensured Cole made forward runs in the opposition's half; Aston Villa manager Martin O'Neill believed the liberation of Cole was a sign that he was "back playing to his very best".

Cole is renowned for making timed goal-line clearances and "cutting out danger". In a league match against Tottenham Hotspur in December 2002, he made two notable clearances, which demonstrated to him that his defensive game had improved. He also made two goal line clearances in Chelsea's 2011–12 Champions League winning campaign. The first was against Napoli, in a 3–1 round-of-16 first leg defeat, and the second in Chelsea's semi-final first leg 1–0 win against Barcelona. Both were vital as Chelsea went on to win the ties with a margin of one goal on aggregate, eventually lifting the Champions League. Cole is said to have a "mean streak", and has been labelled a "dirty player", something which he himself and his former coaches have strongly denied.

== Coaching career ==
Cole became a coach at Derby after retiring from playing, and later followed Frank Lampard to Chelsea where he was an academy coach.

On 27 July 2021, Cole was named as assistant coach of the England U21s alongside head coach Lee Carsley, combining his duties with his role at Chelsea's academy.

On 3 February 2022, Cole joined Everton as a first-team coach, again joining up with Lampard who had recently been appointed as manager. On 23 January 2023, Cole left Everton, as a result of Lampard leaving the club.

When Wayne Rooney was appointed manager of EFL Championship club Birmingham City in October 2023, Cole joined his staff as a first-team coach. He departed the club in September 2024, to join The FA on a full-time basis.

On 23 August 2024, it was confirmed that Cole would assist Carsley in his role as interim head coach of the England senior team, following the departure of Gareth Southgate.

On 15 March 2026, Cole became the head coach of Serie B side Cesena, until the end of the 2025–26 season. After leaving Cesana in June 2026, Cole also left his role as England U21 coach in August.

== Personal life ==
Cole began a relationship with Girls Aloud singer Cheryl Tweedy in September 2004, when they were living in the same block of flats in London; they married on 15 July 2006 in Wrotham Park, Hertfordshire. In January 2008, the couple almost separated after allegations were made that Cole had affairs with three other women. He, however, disputed the allegations and the couple stayed together. It was announced on 23 February 2010 that the couple would separate following new allegations of adultery. Three months later, it was announced that Cheryl was filing for divorce. They officially divorced on 3 September 2010.

Cole has a son (born 2016) and a daughter (born 2018) with the Italian model Sharon Canu, who he married in July 2023.

In 2006, Cole sued the News of the World and The Sun newspapers for libel after they printed allegations that he was involved in a "homosexual orgy". Both papers retracted the allegations. The same year, Cole released an autobiography titled My Defence, which sold 4,000 copies in the first six weeks of release. Cole's former teammate, Jens Lehmann, criticised Cole for writing an autobiography when he was 25.

Cole has had a couple of minor brushes with the police. On 4 March 2009 he was held after swearing in front of a police officer outside a South Kensington nightclub. He was taken to a police station and issued with an £80 fixed penalty notice before being released. On 4 January 2010, Cole was convicted of a speeding offence committed on 17 November 2009. He was recorded exceeding the speed limit by doing 104 mph in a 50 mph zone on the A3 road in Kingston upon Thames, a residential stretch. His defence at Kingston Magistrates' Court, opposing the charge in his absence, argued unsuccessfully that the police speed gun was faulty. Cole also claimed that his actions were excusable because he was trying to evade the paparazzi. On 29 January he was fined £1000 and disqualified from driving for four months.

On 27 February 2011, Cole accidentally shot a 21-year-old sports science student on work experience at Chelsea, with a .22 calibre air rifle from only five feet away at the club's Cobham Training Centre, apparently unaware that the rifle was loaded. Cole formally apologised to the student and discussed the incident with Chelsea officials.

== Career statistics ==
=== Club ===
Appearances and goals by club, season and competition
Club	Season	League			National cup (Note: Includes FA Cup, Coppa Italia, U.S. Open Cup)		League cup (Note: Includes Football League Cup)		Continental		Other		Total	
Club	Season	Division	Apps	Goals	Apps	Goals	Apps	Goals	Apps	Goals	Apps	Goals	Apps	Goals
Arsenal	1999–2000	Premier League	1	0	0	0	1	0	0	0	—		2	0
Arsenal	2000–01	Premier League	17	3	6	0	1	0	9 (Note: Appearances in UEFA Champions League)	0	—		33	3
Arsenal	2001–02	Premier League	29	2	4	0	0	0	7	0	—		40	2
Arsenal	2002–03	Premier League	31	1	3	0	0	0	9	0	1 (Note: Appearance in FA Community Shield)	0	44	1
Arsenal	2003–04	Premier League	32	0	4	0	1	0	9	1	1	0	47	1
Arsenal	2004–05	Premier League	35	2	3	0	0	0	8	0	1	0	47	2
Arsenal	2005–06	Premier League	11	0	0	0	0	0	3	0	1	0	15	0
Arsenal	Total		156	8	20	0	3	0	45	1	4	0	228	9
Crystal Palace (loan)	1999–2000	First Division	14	1	—		—		—		—		14	1
Chelsea	2006–07	Premier League	23	0	5	0	3	0	9	0	0	0	40	0
Chelsea	2007–08	Premier League	27	1	1	0	2	0	10	0	1	0	41	1
Chelsea	2008–09	Premier League	34	1	7	0	0	0	8	0	—		49	1
Chelsea	2009–10	Premier League	27	4	2	0	1	0	4	0	1	0	35	4
Chelsea	2010–11	Premier League	38	0	2	0	0	0	7	0	1	0	48	0
Chelsea	2011–12	Premier League	32	0	4	0	0	0	12	0	—		48	0
Chelsea	2012–13	Premier League	31	1	5	0	3	0	8 (Note: Five appearances in UEFA Champions League, three in UEFA Europa League)	0	4 (Note: One appearance in FA Community Shield, two in FIFA Club World Cup, one in UEFA Super Cup)	0	51	1
Chelsea	2013–14	Premier League	17	0	2	0	1	0	5	0	1 (Note: Appearance in UEFA Super Cup)	0	26	0
Chelsea	Total		229	7	28	0	10	0	63	0	8	0	338	7
Roma	2014–15	Serie A	11	0	2	0	—		3	0	—		16	0
Roma	2015–16	Serie A	0	0	0	0	—		0	0	—		0	0
Roma	Total		11	0	2	0	—		3	0	—		16	0
LA Galaxy	2016	Major League Soccer	29	1	2	0	—		1 (Note: Appearance in CONCACAF Champions League)	0	—		32	1
LA Galaxy	2017	Major League Soccer	29	1	1	0	—		—		—		30	1
LA Galaxy	2018	Major League Soccer	31	1	1	0	—		—		—		32	1
LA Galaxy	Total		89	3	4	0	—		1	0	—		94	3
Derby County	2018–19	Championship	9	0	1	1	—		—		2 (Note: Appearances in Championship play-offs)	0	12	1
Career total			508	19	55	1	13	0	112	1	14	0	702	21

=== International ===
Cole playing for England against Slovenia, 2009

Appearances and goals by national team and year
National team	Year	Apps	Goals
England	2001	7	0
England	2002	9	0
England	2003	7	0
England	2004	13	0
England	2005	8	0
England	2006	13	0
England	2007	4	0
England	2008	7	0
England	2009	9	0
England	2010	9	0
England	2011	7	0
England	2012	6	0
England	2013	7	0
England	2014	1	0
Total		107	0

== Managerial statistics ==
As of match played 8 May 2026

Managerial record by team and tenure
Team	From	To	Record					Ref.
Team	From	To	P	W	D	L	Win %	Ref.
Cesena	15 March 2026	30 June 2026	8	1	3	4	12.5	
Total			8	1	3	4	12.5	

== Honours ==
Arsenal

- Premier League: 2001–02, 2003–04
- FA Cup: 2001–02, 2002–03, 2004–05; runner-up: 2000–01
- FA Community Shield: 2002, 2004
- UEFA Champions League runner-up: 2005–06

Chelsea

- Premier League: 2009–10
- FA Cup: 2006–07, 2008–09, 2009–10, 2011–12
- Football League Cup: 2006–07; runner-up: 2007–08
- FA Community Shield: 2009
- UEFA Champions League: 2011–12; runner-up: 2007–08
- UEFA Europa League: 2012–13
- FIFA Club World Cup runner-up: 2012

Individual

- PFA Team of the Year: 2002–03 Premier League, 2003–04 Premier League, 2004–05 Premier League, 2010–11 Premier League
- UEFA European Championship Team of the Tournament: 2004
- UEFA Team of the Year: 2004, 2010
- Chelsea Players' Player of the Year: 2008–09, 2010–11
- Chelsea Goal of the Season: 2009–10 vs Sunderland
- England Player of the Year: 2010
- Premier League 20 Seasons Awards (1992–93 to 2011–12):
  - Fantasy Teams of the 20 Seasons (Public and Panel choice)
- Premier League Hall of Fame: 2024
- English Football Hall of Fame: 2025

== See also ==
- List of footballers with 100 or more UEFA Champions League appearances
- List of men's footballers with 100 or more international caps
