= Langdon Park =

Langdon Park may refer to:

- Langdon, Washington, D.C., an area of Washington, D.C., in the United States
- Langdon Park, a public park in Poplar, London
  - Langdon Park DLR station, a Docklands Light Railway station
  - Langdon Park School, a secondary school and sixth form
