= Central Foundation Girls' School =

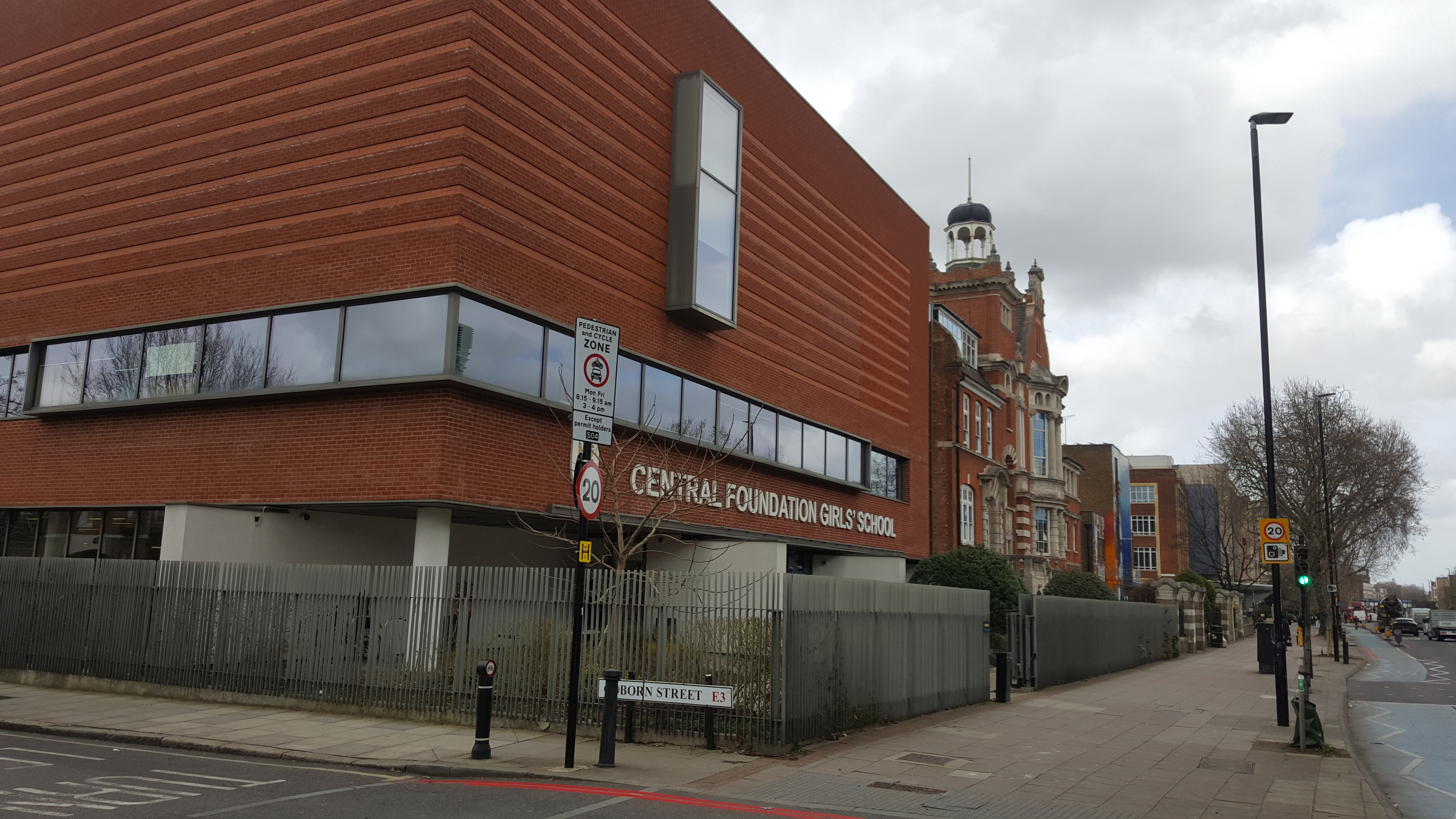

Location
- 25–33 Bow Road; London, E3 2AE; England; 51.52803°N 0.02778°W

Information
- Type: Voluntary aided comprehensive school
- Motto: Latin: Spe Labore Fide (By hope, by work, by faith)
- Established: 1726 as Bishopsgate Ward School
- Local authority: London Borough of Tower Hamlets
- Department for Education URN: 100975 Tables
- Ofsted: Reports
- Headteacher: Carla Prince
- Gender: Girls
- Age: 11 to 18
- Enrolment: 1533 as of 2021
- Colours: Navy blue and grey
- Website: www.cfgs.co.uk

Central Foundation Girls’ School is a voluntary-aided comprehensive girls’ school and sixth form in Bow, London, England, for 11- to 18-year-olds.

It is the sister school to Central Foundation Boys' School in Islington. Both schools are beneficiaries of the charity Central Foundation Schools of London, which in turn is a beneficiary of The Dulwich Estate, successor to the historic College of God's Gift charity.

The school's origins can be traced back to the founding of Bishopsgate Ward School in St Botolph-without-Bishopsgate in 1726. The school moved to various locations including Fanmakers’ Hall, St. Botolph’s churchyard and other buildings around the location of the present Liverpool Street railway station. In 1891 the Central Foundation Schools of London was established to support the boys' school in Cowper Street and the girls' school in Spital Square. Both schools prior to the 1945 Education Act were fee-charging, as were most selective grammar schools at that time. The school was a state grammar school until 1975 when it became comprehensive and at the same time relocated from Spital Square to Bow.

In 2011 Ofsted rated the school 'good', with many outstanding features. The inspectors particularly liked the harmonious community and positive ethos. Students were praised for their courteous and respectful behaviour and keen attitudes to learning. Inspectors also praised the Parents’ Forum and range of classes for parents. Sixth form students were found to have a sense of self-direction and ambition and received good support and guidance with university applications. The inspectors also praised the headteacher for her inspirational leadership. The 2016 and 2021 inspections maintained the status of 'good'.

== Notable alumnae ==
- Kia Abdullah, author and journalist, attended the school from 1992-1998

== See also ==
- List of schools in the London Borough of Tower Hamlets
