= Oaklands School =

Coordinates: 51.52974°N 0.0583°W

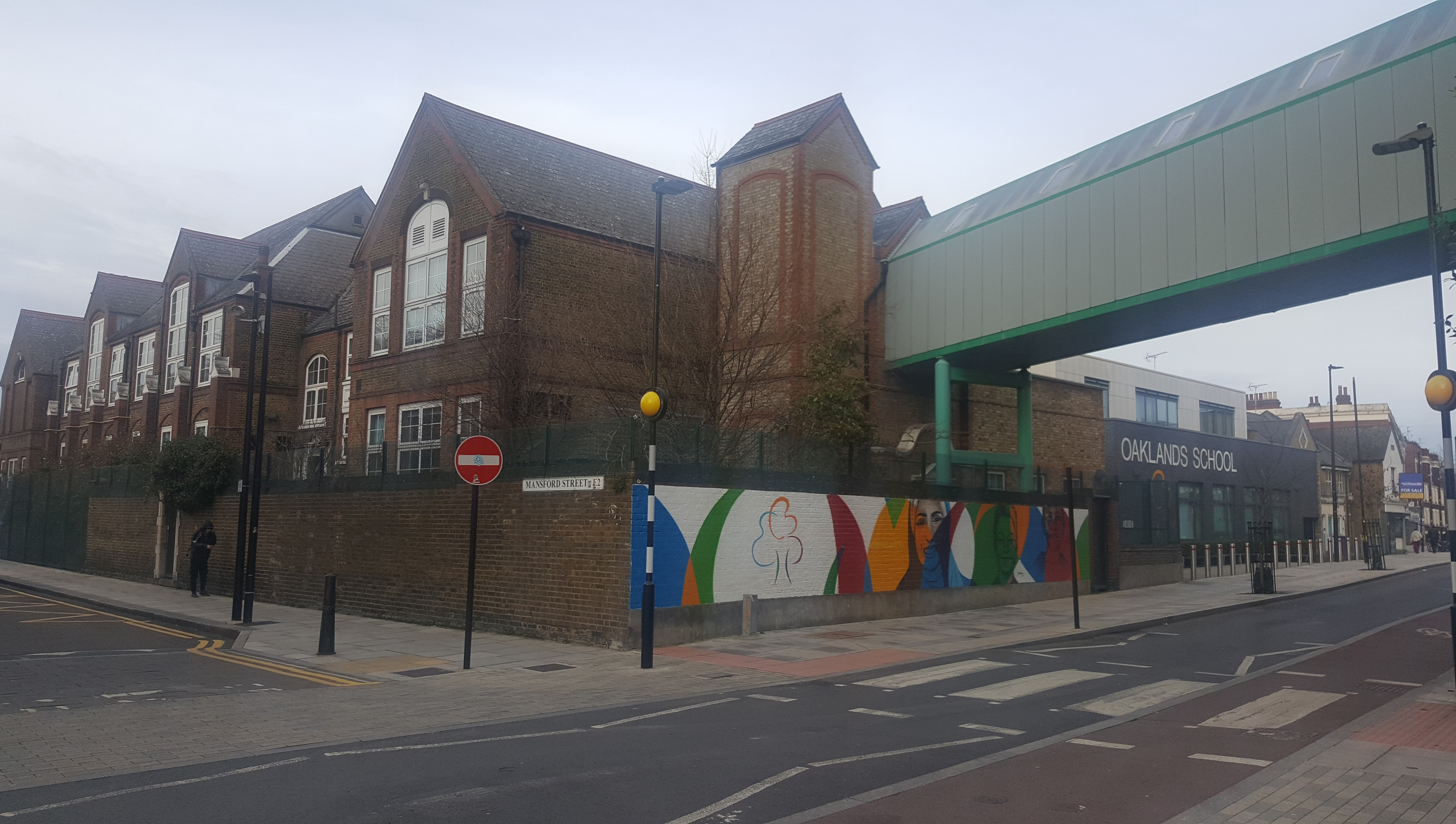

Location
- Old Bethnal Green Road; Bethnal Green, London, E2 6PR; England

Information
- Type: Community
- Motto: We are a learning community that knows no boundaries.
- Local authority: Tower Hamlets
- Department for Education URN: 100972 Tables
- Ofsted: Reports
- Chair: Peter Sherratt
- Headteacher: Simon Ramsey
- Deputy Headteachers: Jason Bonning and Steven Farmer.
- Gender: Mixed
- Age: 11 to 18
- Enrollment: 839
- Website: http://www.oaklands.towerhamlets.sch.uk/

Oaklands School is a community comprehensive secondary school and Sixth form located in Bethnal Green, London Borough of Tower Hamlets, England. The school serves 880 students aged 11–18. On 25 May 2022 Ofsted gave the school a rating of "Good" .
