= St Paul's Way Trust School =

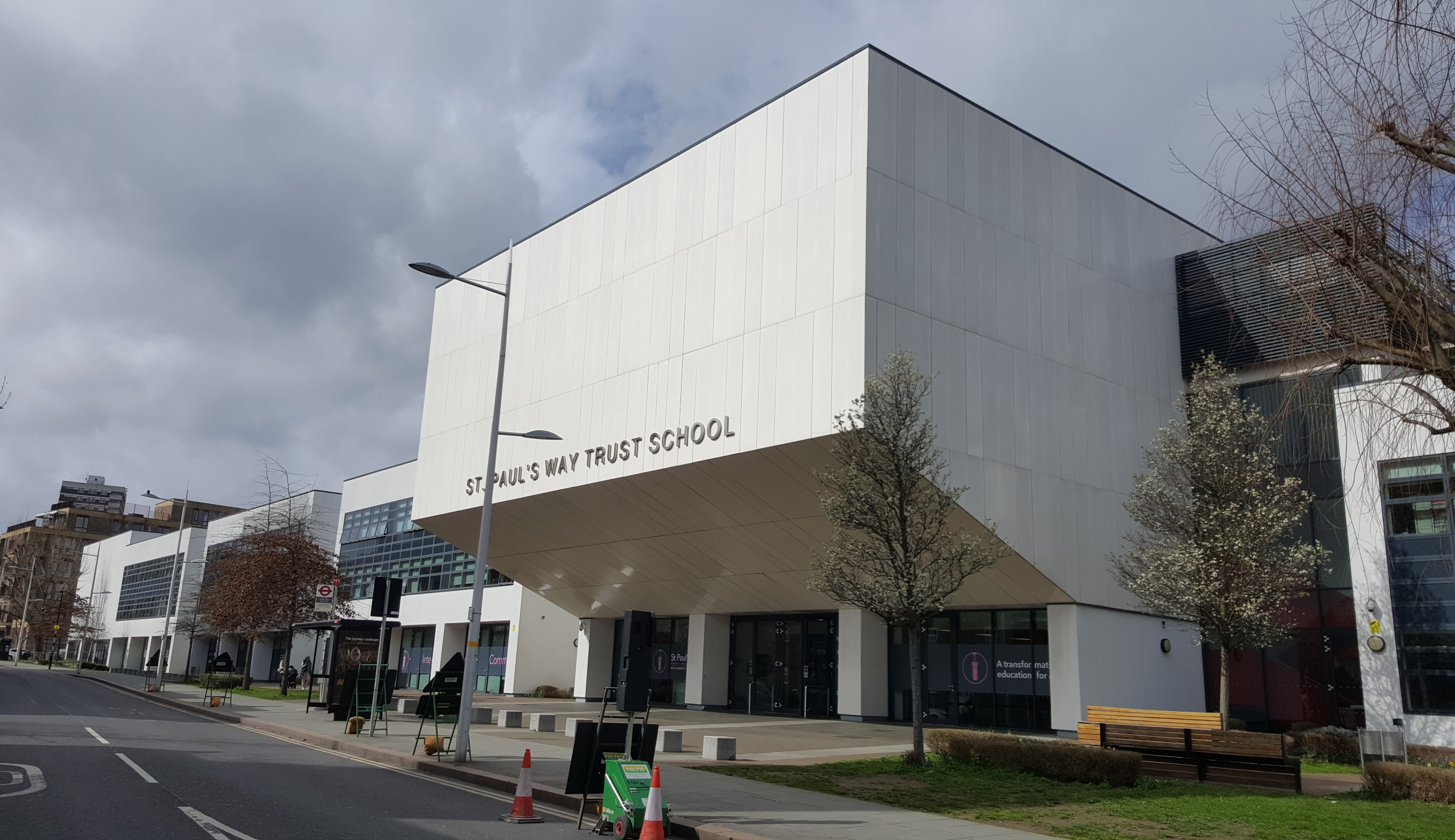

Location
- 125 St Paul's Way; Bow Common; London, E3 4FT; England

Information
- Type: Academy
- Established: 1873; 153 years ago
- Local authority: Tower Hamlets
- Trust: University Schools Trust
- Department for Education URN: 143379 Tables
- Ofsted: Reports
- Headteacher: Philip Akerman
- Gender: Coeducational
- Age: 4 to 18
- Enrolment: 1739
- Publication: Newsletter
- Website: http://www.spwt.net/

St Paul's Way Trust School is a comprehensive co-educational all-through school and sixth form located in the Bow Common area of the London Borough of Tower Hamlets, England.

The School became a Foundation Trust School in March 2010. The Foundation Trust comprised Queen Mary, University of London, King's College London, University of East London, University of Warwick, Catlin Group Limited, London Borough of Tower Hamlets, and Tower Hamlets NHS.

In March 2013 Ofsted described the school as outstanding in every category. It commended the school for its "relentless pursuit of scholarship and excellence". This follows a sustained and rapid improvement in GCSE results that ranked the school amongst the 'most improved schools in England' for 3 consecutive years.

The School moved into a new building in January 2011. It is a Faraday Science Specialist School, which also specialises in Visual and Performing Arts. Its academic Sixth Form opened in September 2011.

The school began admitting primary-age children in September 2014.

St Paul's Way Trust School converted to academy status in September 2016 and is now sponsored by the University Schools Trust.

== Grounds and facilities ==
St Paul's Way Trust School, a flagship new built school, is part of the Building Schools for the Future (BSF) program. The building's innovative design received a number of awards and nominations:

1. Winner of the "London Planning Awards 2011/2012 – Best Built Project – Community Scale Scheme"
2. Winner of a “Civic Trust Award 2013 Commendation"
3. Longlisted in the "World Architecture News – Education Sector 2010"
4. Shortlisted in the “RIBA London 2012 Awards"

Facilities, open to the community, include a public library, a theatre, and a large public sports provision.

The area surrounding the school has recently undergone a major improvement thanks to the work done by the St Paul's Way Transformation Project, of which the school is a member.

=== Research Centre ===
The St Paul's Way Trust Research Centre has two new research laboratories, a classroom teaching space, and other flexible multi-use spaces, suitable for the development of high-level research work by VI Form students. The space is suitable for conducting undergraduate-style tasks and projects.

== Sixth form ==
The school operates a sixth-form provision in consortium with Bow School, Langdon Park School, and Mulberry Stepney Green Maths, Computing, and Science College. The sixth form consortium is known as Sixth Form East.

== History ==
The school opened as St Paul's Road School in 1873, the building being on the junction of Bow Common Lane and the then St Paul's Road; Bow Common Lane in 1900 became the border of the Poplar and Stepney Borough Councils. By the 1950s it was a "central school" using five separate locations.

In the 1960s the school was merged with Millwall Central School and Southern Grove School. Millwall Central School in Glengall Grove is now the Cubitt Town Primary School and the Southern Grove School is now the borough's Professional Development Centre. The merger with the Millwall Central School meant that there were no secondary schools left on the Isle of Dogs, at a time when the Island population was increasing as a result of the building of the Samuda and St Johns Estates in Cubitt Town and the Barkantine Estate in Millwall. St Paul's Way, therefore, became the main choice of school for Islanders until the new George Green School opened in Cubitt Town in September 1975. This led to the school becoming heavily over-subscribed.

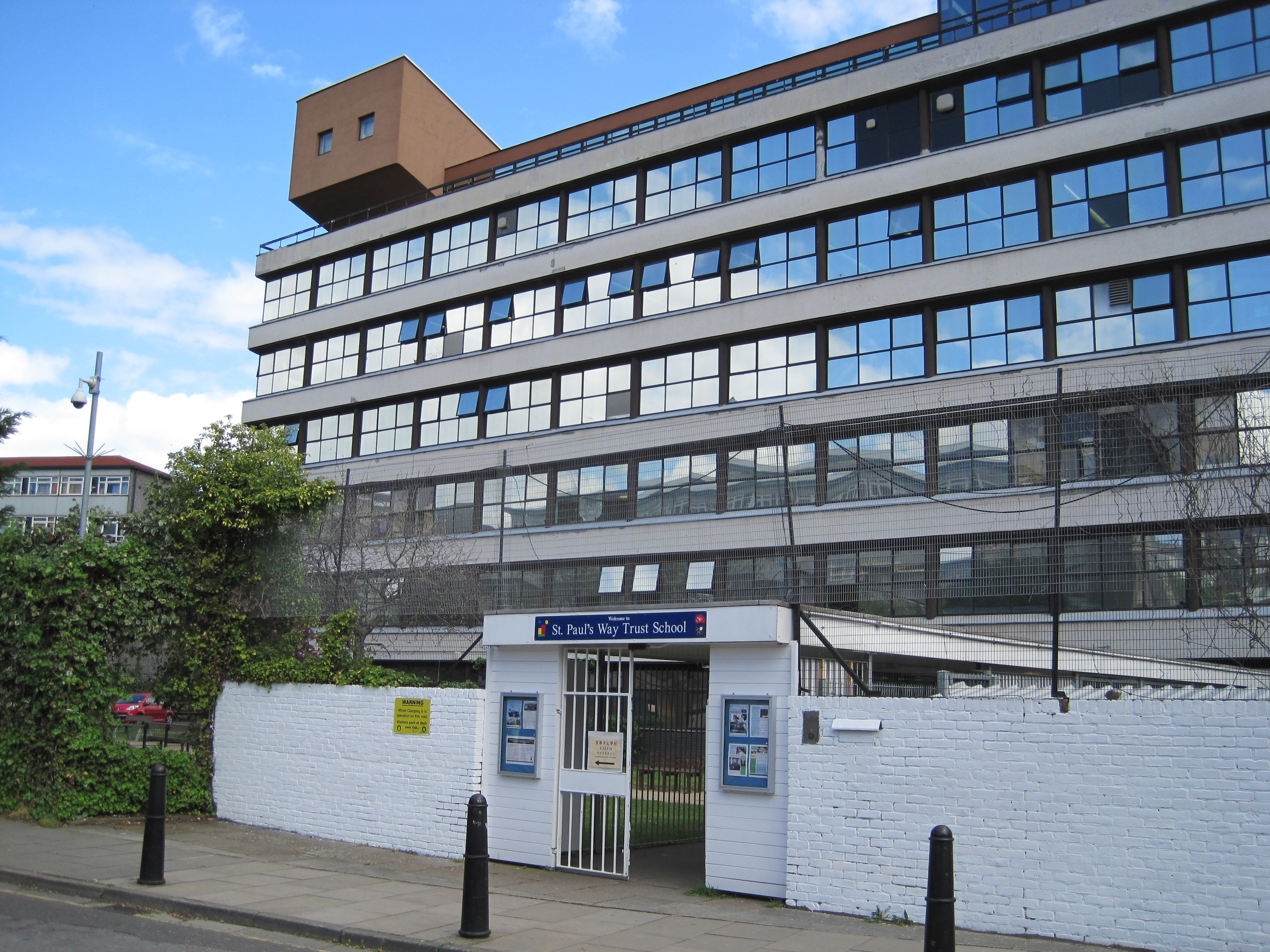
The old building, built in 1966

A new school building at the original site commenced construction in 1966 and the new modern school opened, including a swimming pool and auditorium in September 1968. Arthur J. Davenport became the new Headmaster in September 1970, having previously been Deputy at the nearby Stepney Green Boys School. The school was divided into six houses:

- City - Green - named after the City of London;
- Gate - Yellow - named after Mile End Gate;
- Mill - Brown - named after the Mills on the western wall of the Isle of Dogs;
- Palace - White - named after the People's Palace on Mile End Road;
- Thames - Red - named after the river;
- Tower - Blue - named after the Tower of London.

The school was featured on Panorama at 8pm on Monday 21 March 1977.

The next Headmaster Mike Bannister, who arrived in January 1981, ended the house system with the new intake in September 1981, and introduced a dress code and a tutorial system based on year levels. The East London Advertiser remarked in 1980 on the number of pupils for whom English was a second language, around one in ten. The first Bangladeshi pupils were inducted in 1982. A major HMI report in 1984/5 rated the school's social relationship with its community as "Excellent".

Looking back on her training there, the school was described by Bushra Nasir (later the Head of Plashet School) as 'incredibly tough'.

Vivien Cutler was appointed Headteacher in 1988 and made it a priority to improve security as pupils felt unsafe. On leaving in 1994, she admitted that she had only been partially successful, but had at least improved conditions for female students. Incidents of violence, other anti-social behavior, and gang culture at the school were reported again in 2006 when parents of pupils from the closing Homerton College of Technology in Hackney opposed transfers to St Paul's Way.

Under Martyn Coles, headmaster from 1995 to 2003, the school was an early adopter of specialist schools status, being the second in the country to be awarded a specialism in visual arts in 1998 and forming a local Arts Partnership with Bow Arts Trust a local arts and education charity www.bowarts.org. In 2001 Coles said the school's exam results had improved markedly after this. After adopting an arts specialism, the school achieved the 6th highest results in Art GCSE nationally for 2 years in a row.

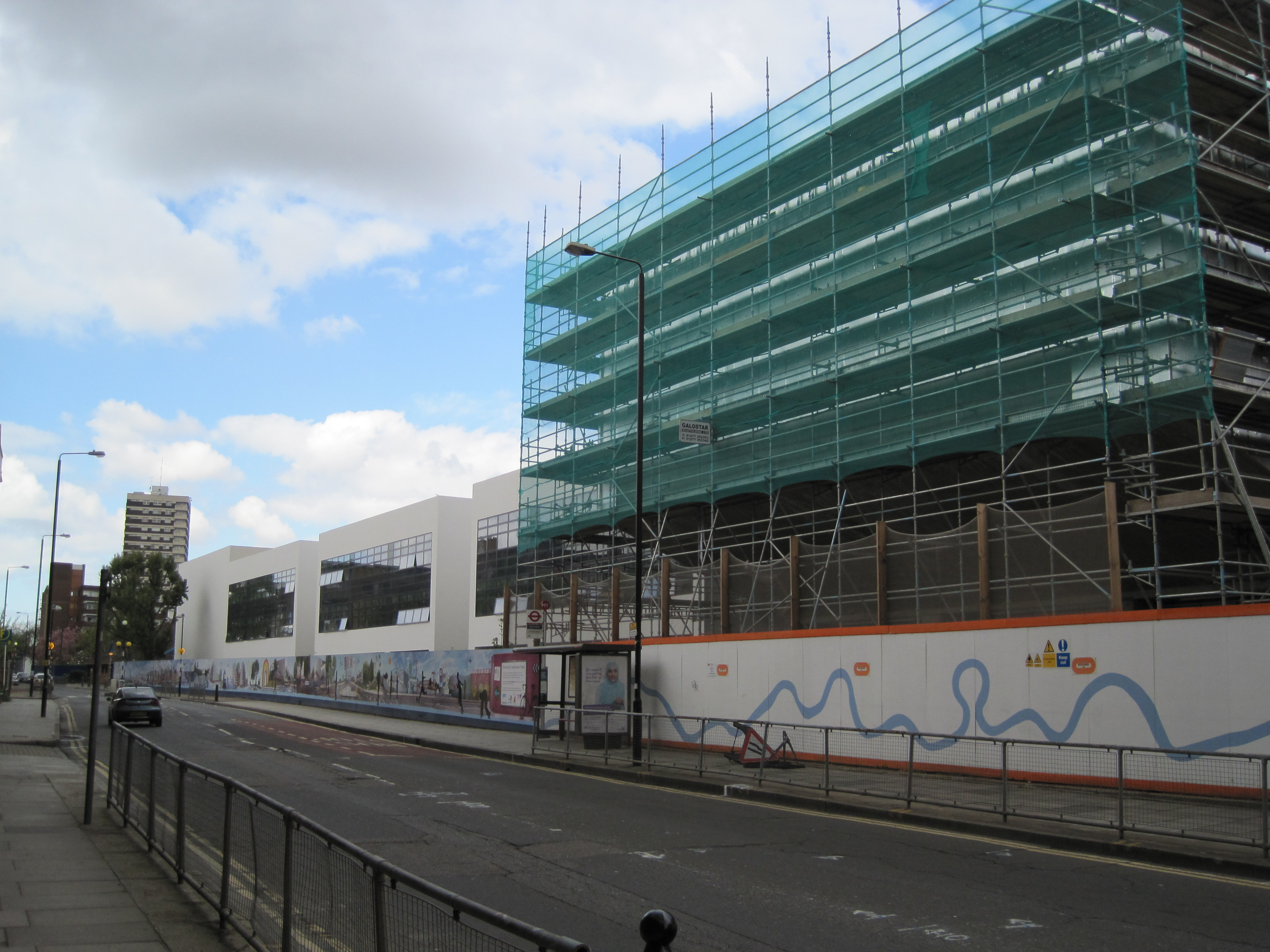
The new school under construction in May 2010

In 2006 the school joined the Building Schools for the Future program to completely replace its 40-year-old building. The £41 million (approx.) construction project by Bouygues began in 2009. The works are within a wider "St Paul's Way Transformation Project", chaired by Lord Andrew Mawson. The school took the opportunity to commission a large artwork on the hoarding, commissioned by Bow Arts and incorporating art by the pupils and professional artist Emily Allchurch— was described as a "crucial" touch by Sir Bob Kerslake of the Homes and Communities Agency.

In 2008 the school caused controversy for firing a teacher, Adrian Swain, for wearing trainers and tracksuits in class, as these were not permitted items of clothing for students.

The school was also threatened with closure that year for poor results. In 2007, 2008, and 2009, fewer than 30% of pupils achieved the benchmark of 5 A* to C grades in GCSE including English and Maths, going against the trend of achieving better outcomes in Tower Hamlets as a whole. Ofsted noted recent improvements in March 2009, particularly since the new head's appointment, but served a Notice to Improve. The Council resolved in 2009 to make it a foundation school, handing over management of the school to a new trust.

The school became a National Challenge Trust on 26 February 2010, attracting extra funding of £700,000 from the DCSF and bringing the expertise of Queen Mary, University of London to bear on the school's performance. The Trust, named St Paul's Way Foundation, is chaired by Nigel Relph of Queen Mary and also includes representatives of the Institute of Education, University of East London and King's College London.

Ofsted inspected the school again in July 2010, and concluded that it had made "huge" improvements since the previous inspection, was providing a satisfactory education and was "securely on track to be good or even excellent." It was scored "outstanding" on some matters, including the extent to which pupils feel safe.

The school will have a second specialism in science in a new "Faraday Unit". As of 2012, the EduBase website lists the school as having a second specialism in Applied Learning.

In January 2014 the school published its intention to also educate primary-age pupils, beginning with a reception class in September 2014.

== Access ==
London Buses is the sole public transport that provides access to the school by routes 309 (Bethnal Green-Canning Town) and 323 (Mile End-Canning Town).

== Notable former pupils ==
- Dizzee Rascal (expelled)
- Danny Shittu, Bolton Wanderers footballer, also plays for the Nigerian national squad
- Festus Akinbusoye, Briton's first black Police and Crime Commissioner, and Conservative Party politician.
