= Beatrice Tate School =

Coordinates: 51.5242°N 0.0305°W

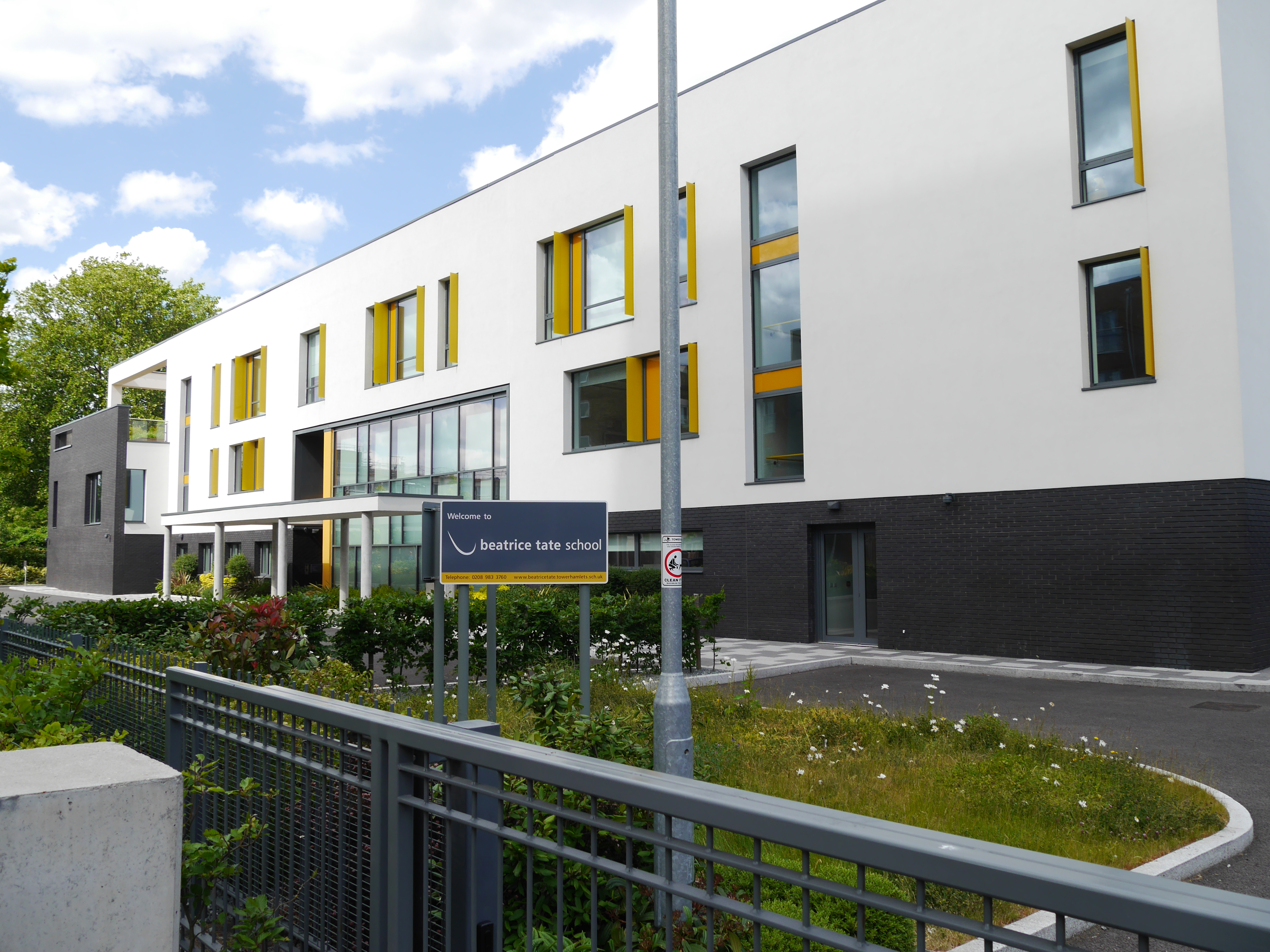

Location
- 41 Southern Grove; Mile End; London, E3 4PX; England

Information
- Type: Community special school
- Established: 2013
- Local authority: Tower Hamlets
- Department for Education URN: 100989 Tables
- Ofsted: Reports
- Headteacher: Wayne Hazzard
- Gender: Coeducational
- Age: 11 to 19
- Enrolment: 99
- Website: http://www.beatricetate.towerhamlets.sch.uk/

Beatrice Tate School is a coeducational special educational needs (SEN) school in Mile End for 11-19 year olds.

The School was previously in Bethnal Green on St Jude's Road. It opened at its current site in 2013, named after a local politician, and was designed by Avanti Architects.

It is located in Mile End, East London.
