= Mulberry Stepney Green Maths, Computing and Science College =

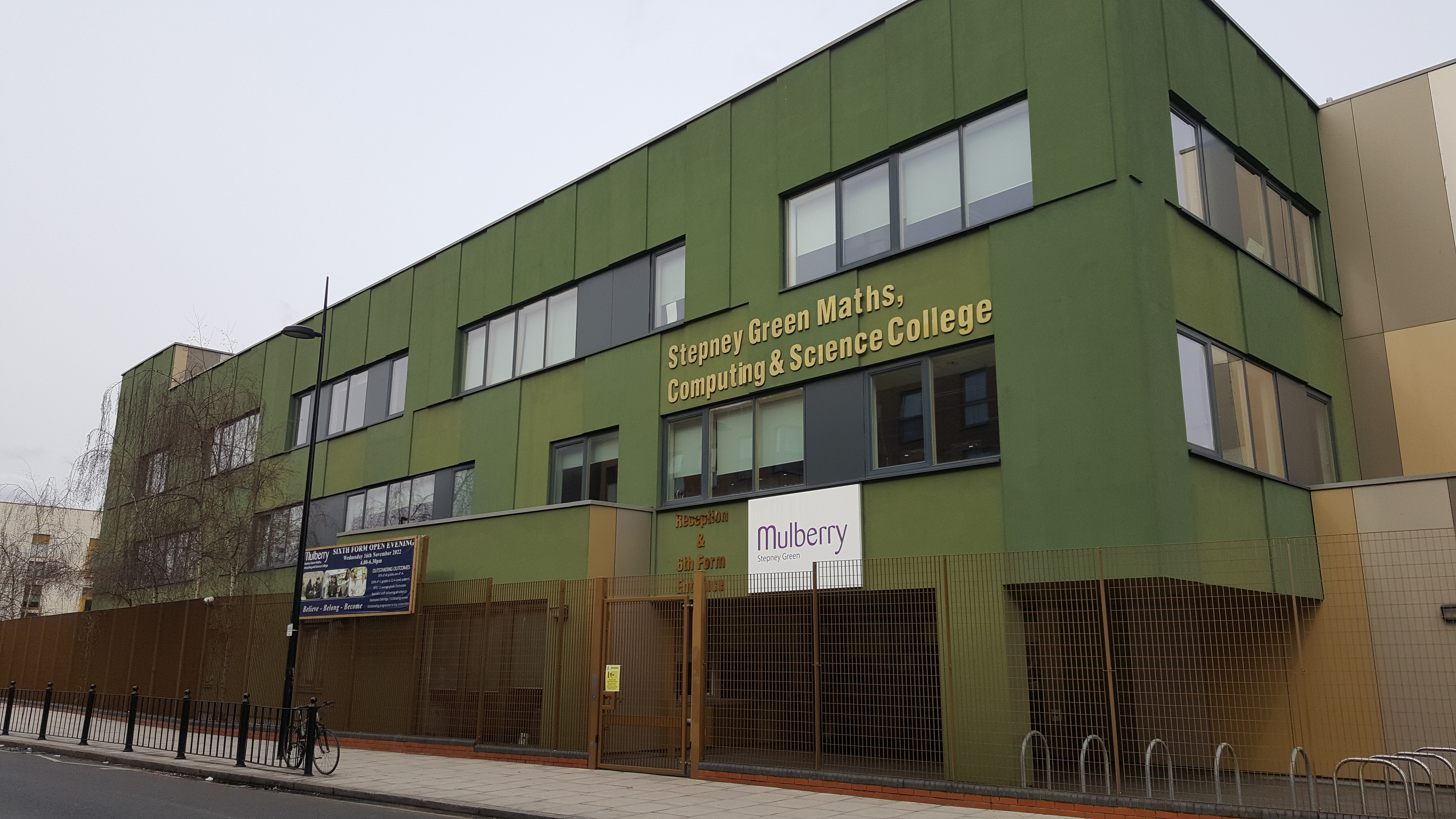

Location
- Ben Jonson Street; Stepney Green, London, E1 4SD; England
- Coordinates: 51.518348°N 0.042753°W

Information
- Type: Academy
- Local authority: Tower Hamlets
- Department for Education URN: 144700 Tables
- Ofsted: Reports
- Head of School: Zumon Chowdhury
- Gender: Coeducational
- Age: 11 to 18
- Enrolment: 1112
- Website: http://www.mulberrystepneygreen.org

Mulberry Stepney Green Maths, Computing and Science College is a coeducational comprehensive secondary school and sixth form. It is situated in Stepney, in the historic East End of London and adjacent to the developments in Docklands, it serves the local community, which is mainly Bangladeshi in origin. It has a well-equipped library, including 300 computers and a good range of fiction and reference books/material.

Previously a community school administered by Tower Hamlets London Borough Council, in March 2018 Stepney Green Maths, Computing and Science College converted to academy status. The school was sponsored by The Tower Trust.

Mulberry Stepney Green Computing, Maths and Science College joined the Mulberry Schools Trust on 1 September 2021.

It was an all-boys school but became coeducational from September 2020.

The curriculum is broad, there is a wide range of extra-curricular activities offered before, during and after school. The PE department organise football and table tennis at lunchtime, after school and on Saturdays. These clubs are especially organised to encourage children of the local community to come and experience sports with qualified PE teachers.

The school operates a sixth form provision in consortium with Bow School, Langdon Park School and St Paul's Way Trust School. The sixth form consortium is known as Sixth Form East.
