= Bow School =

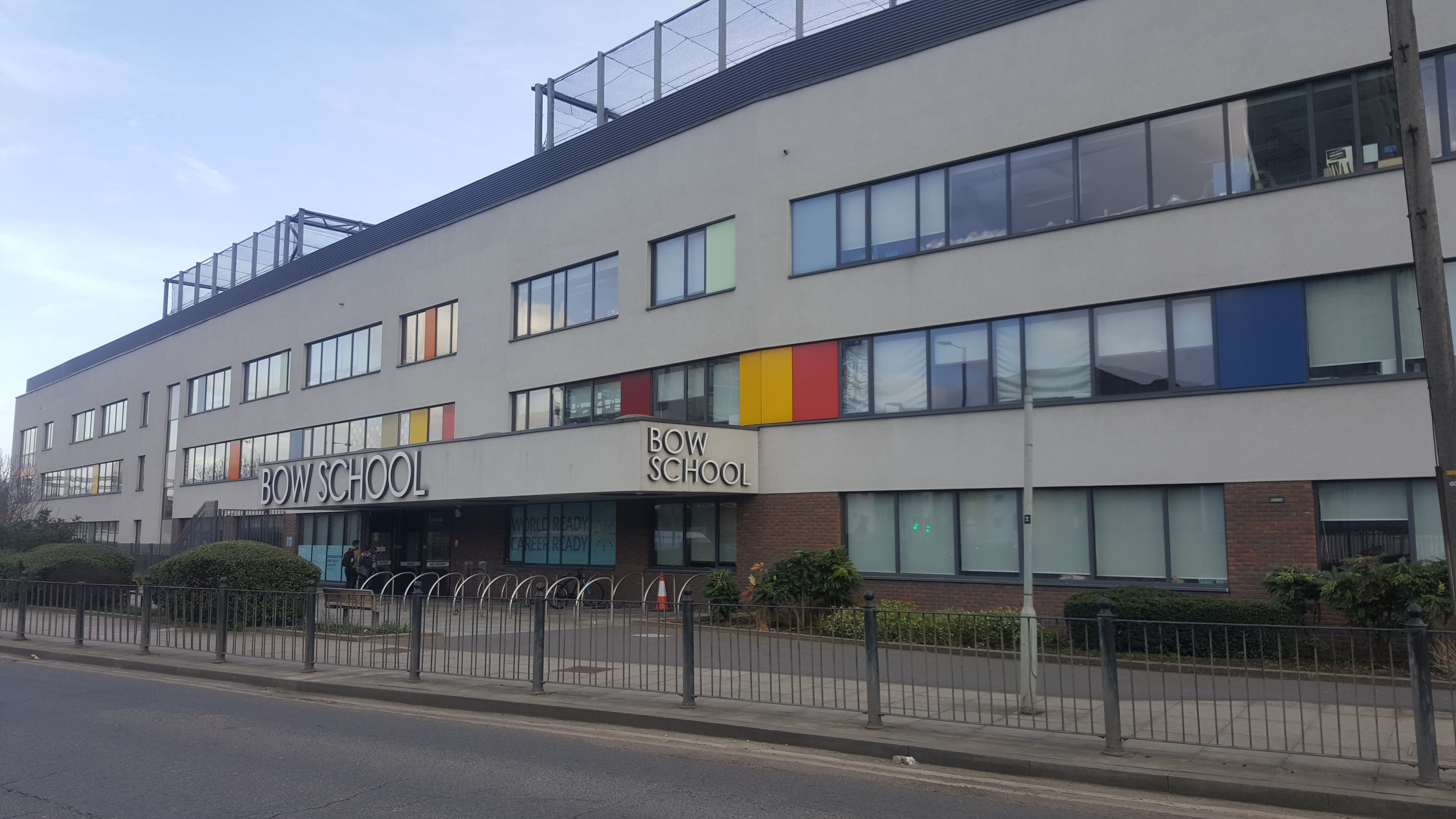

Location
- 44 Twelvetrees Crescent E3 3QW; Bromley-by-Bow, Greater London, E3 3QW; England; 51°31′44″N 0°01′16″W

Information
- Type: Community school
- Motto: Encouraging Ambition, Uncovering Talent, Delivering Excellence
- Established: 1985
- Local authority: London Borough of Tower Hamlets
- Department for Education URN: 100965 Tables
- Ofsted: Reports
- Headteacher: Danny Lye
- Gender: co-educational from 2014, boys-only previously
- Age: 11 to 18
- Enrolment: 1267
- Colours: Blue, Grey
- Website: http://www.bow-school.org.uk/

Bow School is a comprehensive secondary school and sixth form for boys and girls, located in Bromley-by-Bow in the London Borough of Tower Hamlets, England. It has a roll of about 1200 students and increasing. In September 2014 the school moved from the old site off Fairfield Road, Bow to a new site in Bromley-by-Bow a mile to the south-east by Bow Locks, in a new building designed by van Heyningen and Haward Architects. The school started accepting girls in the new school building, along with the move, into Year 7 and the numbers will grow so that by 2019, the school would have all its year groups mixed sex.

== Subjects ==
Bow teaches a number of subjects, including at GCSE and A Level, stretched across a five period day throughout the week.

The school operates a sixth form provision in consortium with Langdon Park School, St Paul's Way Trust School and Mulberry Stepney Green Maths, Computing and Science College. The sixth form consortium is known as Bow Sixth Form. The Head of sixth form at Bow School is Atif Khan.
