= Langdon Park School =

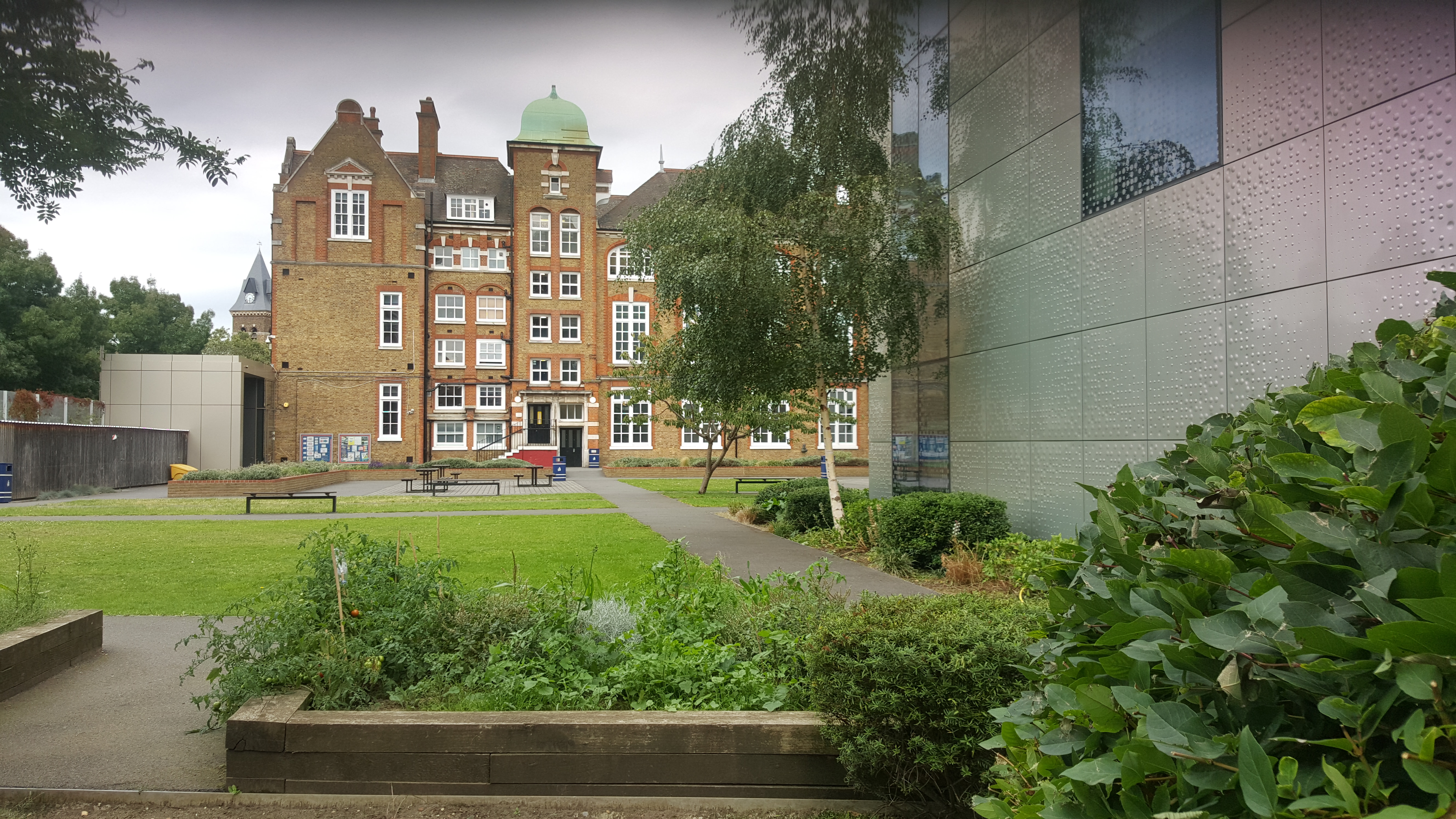

Location
- Byron Street; Poplar, London, E14 0RZ; England; 51.5152°N 0.0118°W

Information
- Type: Community school
- Local authority: Tower Hamlets
- Department for Education URN: 100966 Tables
- Ofsted: Reports
- Headteacher: Nicholas Langham
- Gender: Mixed
- Age: 11 to 18
- Enrolment: 928 as of April 2016
- Colours: Blue & Red
- Website: https://langdonparkschool.co.uk/

Langdon Park School is a co-educational comprehensive secondary school and sixth form, located in the Poplar area of the London Borough of Tower Hamlets, England.

It is a community school administered by Tower Hamlets London Borough Council, and also has specialist Sports College status.

The school operates a sixth form provision in consortium with Bow School, St Paul's Way Trust School and Mulberry Stepney Green Maths, Computing and Science College. The sixth form consortium is known as Sixth Form East.

The school took its current name in 1965 after Charles Langdon, who was vicar at the Church of St Michael and All Angels, Bromley-by-Bow before the Second World War. The older part of the school was built in 1907. The school has previously been named Byron Street School and Hay Currie School, the latter after politician and educationalist Edmund Hay Currie.

== Notable former pupils ==
- Teddy Baldock, boxer
- Lee Bowyer, footballer and manager
- Dizzee Rascal, rapper and musician
- Alex Scott, footballer and broadcaster
