= 1952 Birthday Honours =

British government recognitions

The Queen's Birthday Honours 1952 were appointments in many of the Commonwealth realms of Queen Elizabeth II to various orders and honours to reward and highlight good works by citizens of those countries. The appointments were made to celebrate the official birthday of The Queen, and were published in supplements of the London Gazette on 30 May 1952 for the United Kingdom and Colonies, Australia, New Zealand, Ceylon, and Pakistan.

== United Kingdom and Colonies ==
=== Viscount ===
- The Right Honourable Sir Basil Stanlake Brooke, Bt, CBE, MC, Prime Minister of Northern Ireland.
- The Right Honourable Sir (Alfred) Duff Cooper, GCMG, DSO, Financial Secretary to the Treasury, 1934–1935; Secretary of State for War, 1935–1937; First Lord of the Admiralty, 1937–1938; Minister of Information, 1940–1941; Chancellor of the Duchy of Lancaster, 1941–1943; HM Ambassador to France, 1944–1947.

=== Baron ===
- General Sir George Darell Jeffreys, KCB, KCVO, CMG, JP, DL. For political and public services.
- The Right Honourable Gavin Turnbull, Baron Simonds, Lord High Chancellor of Great Britain.
- Colonel Sir Charles Glen MacAndrew, TD, MP, Member of Parliament for Kilmarnock, 1924–1929; for Partick, 1931–1935; and for the Bute and Northern Division of Ayr and Bute since 1935; Chairman of Ways and Means since 1951.

=== Privy Counsellor ===
- Colonel The Right Honourable Hugh William, Earl Fortescue, KG, CB, OBE, MC, Captain of the Honourable Corps of Gentlemen-at-Arms, Chief Government Whip in the House of Lords.
- The Honourable Eric John Harrison, Vice-President of the Executive Council and Minister for Defence Production in the Commonwealth of Australia.
- Colonel Sir Charles Glen MacAndrew, TD, MP, Member of Parliament for Kilmarnock, 1924–1929; for Partick, 1931–1935; and for the Bute and the Northern Division of Ayr and Bute since 1935. Chairman of Ways and Means since 1951.

=== Baronet ===
- Charles Lennard Chute, MC, DL. For public services in Hampshire, Chairman of the County Council.
- Lieutenant-Colonel Garden Beauchamp Duff, DSO. For political and public services in Aberdeenshire.
- Sir (George) Leighton Seager, CBE, JP, DL. For political and public services.
- Geoffrey Summers, CBE, JP, DL. For political and public services in Wales.
- Sir Cecil Pembrey Grey Wakeley, KBE, CB, FRCS, President of the Royal College of Surgeons.

=== Knight Bachelor ===
- Carleton Kemp Allen, MC, QC, JP, Warden of Rhodes House, Oxford.
- Edward Arthur Anderson, JP. For political and public services in Middlesbrough.
- Alderman Herbert William Barber. For political and public services in Southport.
- Alderman Alfred Bates, MC, DL, lately Chairman, Lancashire County Council.
- Bernhard Heymann Binder, Chartered Accountant.
- Air Commodore Vernon Sydney Brown, CB, OBE, RAF (Retd.), Chief Inspector of Accidents, Ministry of Civil Aviation.
- Geoffrey Abdy Collins, President of the Law Society.
- William Percy Cowley, CBE, First Deemster and Clerk of the Rolls, Isle of Man.
- John Ellenborough Crowder, MP, Member of Parliament for Finchley since 1935. Second Church Estates Commissioner. For political and public services.
- Henry Thomas Alexander Dashwood, JP, Registrar of the Court of Arches, of the Court of Faculties, and of the Diocese of London. Principal Registrar of the Province of Canterbury.
- His Honour David Davies, QC, National Insurance Commissioner and Industrial Injuries Commissioner.
- Rupert de la Bère, JP, MP, Member of Parliament for Evesham, 1935–1950, and for South Worcestershire since 1950. For political and public services.
- Frederick Cecil Ellerton, Deputy Chairman, Barclays Bank.
- Eric Errington, JP, Member of parliament for Bootle, 1935–1945. For political and public services in the North-West.
- David Emrys Evans, Principal of the University College of North Wales, Bangor.
- William Scott Farren, CB, MBE, Technical Director, A.V. Roe & Co. Ltd.
- Ronald Aylmer Fisher, Arthur Balfour Professor of Genetics, University of Cambridge.
- Archibald McDonald Gordon, CMG, Counsellor (Labour), HM Embassy, Washington.
- Clarence Johnston Graham. For political and public services in Northern Ireland.
- George Goldie Graham, OBE, JP, Secretary, Scottish Football Association.
- Fred Haigh, Chairman, Wool Textile Delegation.
- Charles Joseph William Harris, CBE, Private Secretary to the Parliamentary Secretary, HM Treasury.
- William Errington Hume, CMG, MD, FRCP, Lately Senior Physician, Royal Victoria Infirmary, Newcastle. Emeritus Professor of Medicine, University of Durham.
- Alderman Harold Warters Jackson. For political and public services in Sheffield.
- Frederic Charles Johnson, CB, Receiver for the Metropolitan Police District.
- John Henry Keeling, Deputy Chairman, British European Airways Corporation.
- Colonel Ambrose Keevil, CBE, MC, DL. For political and public services in the Home Counties.
- John Geoffrey Nelson Lowles. For political and public services in the Home Counties.
- Arnold Henry Moore Lunn. For services to British Skiing, and to Anglo-Swiss relations.
- Edward Montague Compton Mackenzie, OBE, Author.
- Alderman Sidney Horatio Marshall, JP, DL, MP, Member of Parliament for Sutton and Cheam since 1945. For political and public services in Surrey.
- Bryan Harold Cabot Matthews, CBE, Professor of Physiology, University of Cambridge. For services to the Air Ministry.
- William Booth Rennie Morren, CBE, MVO, Chief Constable of Edinburgh City.
- John Musker. For political and public services in London.
- Lewis Bernstein Namier, Professor of Modern History, University of Manchester.
- Carol Reed. Film producer and director.
- Leslie Roberts, CBE, Chairman and Managing Director, Manchester Ship Canal Company.
- Henry James Ross, Chairman, Scotch Whisky Association.
- Herbert Babington Robin Rowell, CBE, AFC, DL, Chairman and Managing Director, R.& W. Hawthorn Leslie & Co. Ltd., Newcastle upon Tyne.
- Geoffrey Herbert Savage, Chairman, Central Conference of Employers and Trade Unions in the Engineering Industry.
- Alderman Archibald Havergal Downes-Shaw, OBE. For political and public services in Bristol.
- Major-General Kenneth William Dobson Strong, CB, OBE (Retd.), Director, Joint Intelligence Bureau, Ministry of Defence.
- Vice-Admiral Ernest Augustus Taylor, CMG, CVO, Royal Navy (Retd.), Member of Parliament for South Paddington, 1930–1950. For political and public services.
- Gordon Cosmo Touche, MP, Member of Parliament for the Reigate Division, 1931–1950, and for the Dorking Division since 1950. For political and public services.
- Robert Eric Mortimer Wheeler, CIE, MC, Secretary of the British Academy, Professor of the Archaeology of the Roman Provinces, University of London.

State of Victoria

- The Honourable Herbert John Thornhill Hyland, Minister of Transport, Prices & State Development, State of Victoria.

State of South Australia

- John Keith Angas, a prominent pastoralist in the State of South Australia.

State of Western Australia.

- Anthony Langlois Bruce Lefroy, MC, JP. For public services in the State of Western Australia.

Commonwealth Services

- Anthony Joseph Elkins, CBE, Vice President of the All-India United Kingdom Citizens Association.

Colonies, Protectorates, Etc.

- Bernard Augustus Keen, Director, East African Agriculture & Forestry Research Organization.
- John Edward Stewart Lamb, CMG, Political Liaison Officer, Tanganyika.
- Edgar Laurent, CMG, MD. For public services in Mauritius.
- Kenneth Kennedy O'Connor, MC, Colonial Legal Service, Chief Justice, Jamaica.
- Emmanuel Charles Quist, OBE, Speaker of the Legislative Assembly, Gold Coast.
- Thomas Weston Johns Taylor, CBE, Principal, University College of the West Indies.

=== Order of the Bath ===
==== Knight Grand Cross of the Order of the Bath (GCB) ====
Military Division

- General Sir Gwilym Ivor Thomas, KCB, KBE, DSO, MC (1374), late Royal Regiment of Artillery. Colonel Commandant, Royal Regiment of Artillery.

==== Knight Commander of the Order of the Bath (KCB) ====
Military Division

Royal Navy

- Vice-Admiral Guy Grantham, CB, CBE, DSO.
- Vice-Admiral William Rudolph Slayter, CB, DSO, DSC.

Army

- Lieutenant-General Sir Neil Cantlie, KBE, CB, MC, MB, FRCS (4217), late Royal Army Medical Corps (now retired).
- Lieutenant-General Sir George Watkin Eben James Erskine, KBE, CB, DSO (15806), late Infantry.

Royal Air Force

- Air Marshal Sir Hugh Sydney Porter Walmsley, KCIE, CB, CBE, MC, DFC, Royal Air Force.
- Acting Air Marshal James Donald Innes Hardman, CB, OBE, DFC, Royal Air Force.

Civil Division

- John Malcolm Kenneth Hawton, CB, Secretary, Ministry of Health.
- Edwin Alan Hitchman, CB, Permanent Secretary, Ministry of Materials.

==== Companion of the Order of the Bath (CB) ====
Military Division

Royal Navy

- Rear-Admiral (E) Francis Edward Clemitson.
- Rear-Admiral Eric George Anderson Clifford.
- Rear-Admiral Caspar John.
- Surgeon Rear-Admiral Thomas Madill, OBE, MB, BCh.
- Rear-Admiral Charles Fred Wivell Norris, DSO.
- Rear-Admiral Cecil Ramsden Langworthy Parry, DSO.
- Rear-Admiral Philip Sydney Smith, DSO.
- Rear-Admiral (S) Edward Loftus Tottenham, OBE.
- Lieutenant-General John Chaddesley Westall, CBE, Royal Marines.

Army

- Major-General Edward Riou Benson, CMG, CBE (23639), late Royal Regiment of Artillery.
- Major-General (temporary) John Bryan Churcher, DSO, ADC (31905), late Infantry.
- Brigadier (temporary) Robert Kenah Exham, CBE, MC (36543), late Infantry.
- Major-General Howard Courteney Goodfellow, CBE (13961), late Royal Army Service Corps.
- Brigadier Walter Douglas Campbell Greenacre, DSO, MVO (21343), late Foot Guards.
- Major-General James Laurence Piggott Haines, CBE (13497), late Royal Regiment of Artillery.
- Major-General Arnold Guy Harsant, OBE, MD, MS, QHS (5767), late Royal Army Medical Corps.
- Major-General George Charles Humphreys, CBE (13231), late Infantry.
- Major-General George Henry Inglis, CBE (14525), late Royal Regiment of Artillery.
- Major-General Charles Phibbs Jones, CBE, MC (34845), late Corps of Royal Engineers.
- Major-General Roderick William McLeod, CBE (31581), late Royal Regiment of Artillery.
- Major-General George Erroll Prior-Palmer, DSO (27516), late Royal Armoured Corps.
- Honorary Brigadier Eric Ommaney Skaife, OBE, DL (3903), Army Cadet Force (now retired).

Royal Air Force

- Acting Air Marshal James MacConnell Kilpatrick, OBE, MB, BCh, QHP, Royal Air Force.
- Air Vice-Marshal Hubert Leonard Patch, CBE, Royal Air Force.
- Acting Air Vice-Marshal Leslie Dalton-Morris, CBE, Royal Air Force.
- Air Commodore Bertram Edward Essex, CBE, Royal Air Force.
- Air Commodore Gerald Stanley Shaw, Royal Air Force (Retd.)
- Air Commodore Michael Watson, CBE, Royal Air Force.
- Acting Air Commodore Anthony Dunkerton Selway, DFC, Royal Air Force.
- Group Captain Leonard Somerville Snaith, AFC, Royal Air Force.
- Group Captain Donald Malcolm Thomas Macdonald, Royal Air Force.

Civil Division

- Richard Clementson Chilver, Assistant Under-Secretary of State, Air Ministry.
- Patrick James Edward Dalmahoy, Under-Secretary, Ministry of Transport.
- Captain Cyril Roper Pollock Diver, CBE, Director-General, Nature Conservancy.
- Robert Hamilton Farrell, Under-Secretary, Ministry of National Insurance.
- Ian McMillan Forsyth, Under-Secretary, Ministry of Fuel & Power.
- Charles Edward Key, CBE, Under-Secretary, War Office.
- Herbert George Lindsell, Under-Secretary, Ministry of Supply.
- Edward Mayow Hastings Lloyd, CMG, Under-Secretary, Ministry of Food.
- Cecil Bernard Oldman, Principal Keeper, Department of Printed Books, British Museum.
- Brigadier Guy Maurice Berkeley Portman, TD, DL, Chairman, County of London Territorial and Auxiliary Forces Association.
- Colonel Alfred Howard Read, OBE, TD, DL, Director of Overseas Telecommunications, General Post Office.
- Peter Henri Sée, Parliamentary Counsel.
- Thomas Grainger-Stewart, MC, TD, Deputy Secretary, Scottish Education Department.
- John Wedlake, MBE, Director of Armament Supply, Admiralty.
- Clarence Faithfull Monier-Williams, MBE, Under-Secretary, Board of Trade.
- Joseph Robert McKenzie Willis, CMG, Commissioner & Secretary, Board of Inland Revenue.

Additional Companion

- Major Edward William Spencer Ford, MVO, Assistant Private Secretary to The Queen.

=== Order of Saint Michael and Saint George ===
==== Knight Grand Cross of the Order of St Michael and St George (GCMG) ====
- The Right Honourable Edward George William Tyrwhitt, Viscount Knollys, KCMG, MBE, DFC. For services as the representative of Her Majesty's Government on the International Materials Conference.
- Sir (Peter) Alexander Clutterbuck, KCMG, MC, High Commissioner in Canada for Her Majesty's Government in the United Kingdom.
- Sir Victor Alexander Louis Mallet, KCMG, CVO, Her Majesty's Ambassador Extraordinary and Plenipotentiary in Rome.

==== Knight Commander of the Order of St Michael and St George (KCMG) ====
- Brigadier James Frederick Gault, MVO, OBE, Personal Assistant to the Supreme Allied Commander Europe.
- Sir Cecil McAlpine Weir, KBE, MC. For services as a Member of the Dollar Exports Council.
- General Sir Reginald Alexander Dallas Brooks, KCB, CMG, DSO, Governor of the State of Victoria.
- The Right Honourable Edward John Williams, JP, High Commissioner in Australia for Her Majesty's Government in the United Kingdom.
- Kenneth William Blackburne, CMG, OBE, Governor and Commander-in-Chief, Leeward Islands.
- Major-General Robert Arthur Ross Neville, CBE, RM, Governor and Commander-in-Chief, Bahamas.
- Philip Mainwaring Broadmead, CMG, MC, Her Majesty's Ambassador Extraordinary and Plenipotentiary in Prague.
- Henry Ashley Clarke, CMG, Deputy Under-Secretary of State, Foreign Office.
- Derwent William Kermode, CMG, Her Majesty's Ambassador Extraordinary and Plenipotentiary in Djakarta.
- Lieutenant-Colonel Sir Charles George Wickham, KBE, DSO, lately Chief of the British Police Mission to Greece.

==== Companion of the Order of St Michael and St George (CMG) ====
- John Herbert Brook, Assistant Secretary, Ministry of Fuel & Power.
- Frank Richard Cowell, Assistant Secretary, Ministry of Education.
- Leslie George Fisher, Director, Oils & Fats Division, Ministry of Food.
- Laurence Harrison, United Kingdom Trade Commissioner (Grade I), Delhi.
- Philip Jaques Mantle, Deputy Head, Administration of Enemy Property Department, Board of Trade.
- David Radford Serpell, OBE, Assistant Secretary, HM Treasury.
- Leonard Joseph Lancelot Addison, CBE, Deputy High Commissioner for the United Kingdom, Calcutta.
- William Arthur Weir Clark, CBE, a senior officer in the Colonial Service attached for duty as Assistant Secretary in the Commonwealth Relations Office.
- Leighton Francis Irwin. For services to Architectural Education in the State of Victoria.
- Gurth Kimber, Deputy High Commissioner for the United Kingdom, Bombay.
- The Honourable Sir Allan Ross Welsh, Speaker of the Legislative Assembly, Southern Rhodesia, 1935–1952.
- Arthur Edward Trevor Benson, Colonial Administrative Service, Chief Secretary, Nigeria.
- Henry Townsend Bourdillon, Assistant Secretary, Colonial Office.
- Major Geoffrey Noel Burden, MBE, Colonial Administrative Service, Chief Commissioner of the Northern Territories, Gold Coast.
- William Foster Norton Churchill, Colonial Administrative Service, British Adviser, Kelantan, Federation of Malaya.
- John Fletcher-Cooke, Colonial Administrative Service, Colonial Secretary, Cyprus.
- Robert de Zouche Hall, Colonial Administrative Service, Member for Local Government, Tanganyika.
- Brian Charles Keith Hawkins, OBE, Colonial Administrative Service, Commissioner of Labour, Hong Kong.
- Barclay Leechman, OBE, Colonial Administrative Service, Member for Social Services, Tanganyika.
- James Robert Maxwell. For services to Local Government in Kenya.
- Evelyn Philip Sewallis Shirley, OBE, Colonial Administrative Service, Chief Secretary and Commissioner for Native Affairs, Somaliland.
- Trafford Smith, Assistant Secretary, Colonial Office.
- Alexander Frederick Richard Stoddart, Colonial Administrative Service, Colonial Secretary, Fiji.
- George Alfred Tyson. For public services in Kenya.
- Charles Wilcocks, MD, FRCP, Director, Bureau of Hygiene & Tropical Diseases.
- Robert Burns, lately Counsellor (Commercial) at Her Majesty's Embassy in Washington.
- Michael Justin Creswell, Minister at Her Majesty's Embassy in Cairo.
- Eric Armar Vully de Candole, CBE, lately British Resident in Cyrenaica.
- John Kinninmont Dunlop, CBE, MC, TD, PhD, Land Commissioner, Hamburg, Control Commission for Germany, British Element.
- George Arthur Carey Foster, DFC, AFC, Head of Security Department of the Foreign Office.
- Sidney James Fulton, Attached to the Ministry of Defence.
- Ian Leslie Henderson, Her Majesty's Ambassador Extraordinary and Plenipotentiary at Asuncion.
- James Thyne Henderson, Her Majesty's Consul-General at Houston.
- Malcolm Siborne Henderson, Counsellor (Commercial) at Her Majesty's Embassy in Lisbon.
- Christopher Gurdon Kemball, Head of Consular Department of the Foreign Office.
- John George Mavrogordato, Legal Counsel, Sudan Government.
- Cornelius James Pelly, OBE, Political Agent at Kuwait, Persian Gulf.

Honorary Companion

- Tengku Yahya Petra ibni Sultan Ibrahim, His Highness the Tengku Mahkota of Kelantan, Federation of Malaya.

=== Royal Victorian Order ===
==== Knight Grand Cross of the Royal Victorian Order (GCVO) ====
- Lieutenant-Colonel Sir Terence Edmund Gascoigne Nugent, KCVO, MC.

==== Knight Commander of the Royal Victorian Order (KCVO) ====
- Albert George Allen, DSO, MC.
- Anthony Bevir, CVO, CBE.
- The Right Honourable John, Earl of Eldon.
- Air Commodore Edward Hedley Fielden, CB, CVO, DFC, AFC, Royal Air Force.
- Brigadier-General Robert Harvey Kearsley, CMG, CVO, DSO.
- Sir (William) Henry Peat, GBE.
- (Victor) Michael Barrington-Ward, CBE, DSO.

==== Commander of the Royal Victorian Order (CVO) ====
- Major Reginald Narcissus Macdonald-Buchanan, MBE, MC.
- Captain William Albemarle Fellowes, MVO.
- Colonel George Charles Gordon-Lennox, DSO, Grenadier Guards.
- Colonel Mark Edward Makgill-Crichton-Maitland, DSO.
- Captain Cecil Charles Boyd-Rochfort.
- Brigadier Walter Morley Sale, OBE.

==== Member of the Royal Victorian Order, 4th class (MVO) ====
- Captain Ronald George Ballantine, British Overseas Airways Corporation.
- Rex Hope West Hope, OBE, MC.
- Major the Honourable Michael Fitzalan-Howard, MBE, MC, Scots Guards.
- Stanley Lawrence Lees.
- Diana Maud Lyttelton.
- Edward Alfred Mitchell.
- George Mould, OBE.
- Captain Robert Clive Parker, British Overseas Airways Corporation.
- Leta Smith.
- Alfred Edward Stillwell, OBE.
- Walter John George Verco.
- Cyril Whitaker.

==== Member of the Royal Victorian Order, 5th class (MVO) ====
- Superintendent Inspector Albert Edward Perkins, Metropolitan Police.
- Robert Sahli.

=== Order of the British Empire ===
==== Knight Grand Cross of the Order of the British Empire (GBE) ====
Civil Division

- Sir William Henry Bradshaw Mack, KCMG, Her Majesty's Ambassador Extraordinary and Plenipotentiary in Buenos Aires.

==== Knight Commander of the Order of the British Empire (KBE) ====
Military Division

Royal Navy

- Vice-Admiral William York La Roche Beverley, CB, CBE.
- Vice-Admiral Geoffrey Alan Brooke Hawkins, CB, MVO, DSC.

Army

- Lieutenant-General (temporary) Colin Muir Barber, CB, DSO (6512), late Infantry.
- Lieutenant-General (temporary) Francis Wogan Festing, CB, CBE, DSO (611), late Infantry.

Royal Air Force

- Air Vice-Marshal Robert Allingham George, CB, CBE, MC.

Civil Division

- Sir Godfrey Baring, Bt, JP, DL. For public services. Chairman of the Isle of Wight County Council for over fifty years and Chairman of the Royal National Lifeboat Institution for twenty-seven years.
- Ben Lewis Barnett, CB, MC, Deputy Director General, General Post Office.
- George Sangster Dunnett, CB, Deputy Secretary, Ministry of Agriculture & Fisheries.
- Edward Hale, CB, Secretary, University Grants Committee.
- Sir Harry Finlayson Methven, Chairman, National Service Hostels Corporation.
- Sir George Morton, QC, Sheriff of Aberdeen, Kincardine & Banff. Convener of the Sheriffs.
- Charles Dalrymple Belgrave, CBE, Financial Adviser to the Shaikh of Bahrain.
- Alfred Louis Chick, Financial Secretary to the Sudan Government.
- Henry Arthur Hobson, CBE, Her Majesty's Consul-General at New York.
- The Honourable Sir Clifden Henry Andrews Eager, QC, President of the Legislative Council of the State of Victoria since 1943.
- Moroboe Vincenzo Del Tufo, CMG, lately Chief Secretary, to the Government of the Federation of Malaya.

==== Dame Commander of the Order of the British Empire (DBE) ====
Civil Division

- Florence Anne Bevin, Widow of the Right Honourable Ernest Bevin formerly Secretary of State for Foreign Affairs.
- Kathleen D'Olier Courtney, CBE, Lately Chairman, Executive Committee, United Nations Association.
- The Right Honourable Frances Joan, Viscountess Davidson, OBE, MP, Member of Parliament for Hemel Hempstead since 1937. For political and public services.

==== Commander of the Order of the British Empire (CBE) ====
Military Division

Royal Navy

- Engineer Rear-Admiral Cecil Reginald Percival Bennett, OBE.
- Captain (S) Jack Kenneth Highton, OBE.
- Surgeon-Captain John George Maguire, MB, BCh.
- The Reverend Douglas James Noel Wanstall, OBE, Chaplain.

Army

- Brigadier (temporary) William John James Allen, OBE (26863), late Royal Army Service Corps.
- Colonel (acting) Arthur Barber, MC (283422), Army Cadet Force.
- Brigadier (temporary) Robert Napier Hubert Campbell Bray, DSO (39414), late Infantry.
- The Reverend John Michael Clarke, OBE (49622), Chaplain to the Forces, First Class, Royal Army Chaplains' Department.
- Brigadier (temporary) Desmond Spencer Gordon, DSO (50906), The Green Howards (Alexandra, Princess of Wales's Own Yorkshire Regiment).
- Brigadier (temporary) Adrian Price Webley Hope, OBE (49876), The King's Own Scottish Borderers.
- Brigadier (temporary) Archibald Gordon Mackenzie-Kennedy, DSO, OBE (30892), late Infantry.
- Major-General Wilfrid Austin Lord (37538), Corps of Royal Electrical & Mechanical Engineers.
- Brigadier (temporary) Albert Sachs, MD (36785), late Royal Army Medical Corps.
- Colonel Eric Bindloss Smith, OBE (18074), late Royal Regiment of Artillery.
- Brigadier (temporary) Ralph Francis Ewart Stoney, OBE (23691), late Corps of Royal Engineers.
- Brigadier (temporary) Nigel Grammar Thompson (23693), late Royal Regiment of Artillery.
- Colonel Clive Lochiel Pleasants, DSO, MC, ED, Royal New Zealand Armoured Corps. Commander of the Fiji Military Forces.

Royal Air Force

- Acting Air Vice-Marshal Claude McClean Vincent, CB, DFC, AFC.
- Air Commodore Francis Wilfrid Peter Dixon, MBE, MB, BS, QHS.
- Air Commodore Bryan David Nicholas.
- Acting Air Commodore Hubert Huntlea Chapman, AMIEE.
- Group Captain Willem Rowland Brotherhood.
- Group Captain Denis Finlay, OBE.
- Group Captain Rex Laughton Kippenberger, OBE.
- Group Captain Eric Charles Passmore, OBE.
- Group Captain Colin Scragg, MBE, AFC.
- Group Captain Colin Murray Stewart, OBE.

Civil Division

- Violet Emily Mildred Bathurst, Lady Apsley. For public and social services. Lately National Chairman, Women's Section, British Legion.
- Leslie Jackson Banford, Director of Contracts, Air Ministry.
- The Right Reverend Cuthbert Killick Norman Bardsley, Bishop Suffragan of Croydon. For services to the Forces.
- George Barrie, Chairman of Directors, Barclay, Curle & Co. Ltd., Glasgow.
- George Frederick Newsum Battle, Executive Director, British Sugar Corporation.
- Major Francis William Beech, JP. For political and public services in Woolwich.
- Captain John Leslie Bennet, OBE, Lately Chairman, Northern Ireland Area, British Legion.
- Norman Black, OBE, Director of Lands & Accommodation, Ministry of Works.
- George Leslie Bond, OBE, Lately Assistant Secretary, Board of Trade.
- William Herbert Boucher, MBE, Assistant Secretary, Ministry of Health.
- Thomas Brinley Bowen, Town Clerk of Swansea.
- James Bowman, Chairman, Northern (Northumberland & Cumberland) Division, National Coal Board.
- Edward Cyril Bowyer, Director, Society of British Aircraft Constructors.
- Major John William FitzHerbert-Brockholes, MC, Chairman, Lancashire Agricultural Executive Committee.
- Evelyn James Bunbury, MC, Chairman, Agricultural Mortgage Corporation Ltd.
- May Eudora Campbell, OBE, JP, Chairman for Scotland, Women's Voluntary Services.
- Alderman Bertie Cannell, JP. For political and public services in Norwich.
- Arthur Stanley Charlton, OBE, Assistant Secretary, Ministry of Housing & Local Government.
- Barker Thomas Clegg, JP. For services to the British Empire Cancer Campaign.
- Julia Dorothy, the Honourable Lady Cochrane, President for England, Girl Guides Association. For services to the Girl Guide Movement.
- William Menzies Coldstream, Slade Professor of Fine Art, University College, London.
- George Edward Cove, Commodore Captain, RMS Queen Elizabeth, Cunard Steam Ship Co., Ltd.
- Florence Rose Davies, MBE, JP, Alderman, Glamorgan County Council.
- Sidney Alfred Davis, DSO, OBE, Regional Controller, Midland Region, Ministry of Supply.
- Ernest De'Ath, DCM, Employers' Representative, National Advisory Council on the Employment of the Disabled.
- Major Gilbert Dennison, Chairman of the Export Committee, British Jewellers Association.
- James Wright Dick, MBE, Assistant Secretary, Ministry of National Insurance.
- Edward Montgomery O'Rorke Dickey, HM Inspector of Schools (Staff Inspector, Ministry of Education).
- Basil Gordon Dickins, OBE, Director of Technical & Personnel Administration, Ministry of Supply.
- Thomas James Drakeley, Principal, Northern Polytechnic, London.
- Captain Peter Duguid, JP. For political and public services in Kincardine and West Aberdeenshire.
- George Robert Edwards, MBE, Chief Designer, Vickers-Armstrongs Ltd., Weybridge.
- Major Arthur Cecil French, OBE, Secretary, Council of Territorial and Auxiliary Forces Associations.
- Helen Louise Gardiner, MVO, Chief Clerk, Office of the Private Secretary to The Queen.
- David Garnett, Author.
- John Clarke George, Chairman, Scottish Slate Industries, Ltd.
- Beatrice Elizabeth Katherine Girouard, Assistant Superintendent-in-Chief, St. John Ambulance Brigade.
- Robert Porter Corry Gotto, OBE, DL. For public services in Belfast.
- Lawrence Burnett Gowing, Painter. Professor of Fine Art, University of Durham.
- Douglas Graham. For political and public services in Huddersfield.
- Harry Gresswell, Assistant Secretary, Ministry of Defence.
- James Russell Hamilton. For political and public services in Moray.
- Stanley Frank Haycock, MM, Assistant Secretary, National Assistance Board.
- Geraldine Emma May Jebb, Lately Principal of Bedford College for Women, University of London.
- Brigadier Frederick Low Johnston, OBE, Secretary, Counties of the City of Edinburgh, the Lothians & Peebles Territorial and Auxiliary Forces Associations.
- Thomas Keeling, JP, Chairman, Liverpool Regional Hospital Board.
- Gerald William Kenrick, Alderman, Worcestershire County Council.
- Maurice Baxendale Knowles, Principal Actuary, Government Actuary's Department.
- Mabel Leddiard, President, Royal College of Midwives.
- Martin Alexander Lindsay, DSO, MP, Member of Parliament for Solihull since 1945. For political and public services in the West Midlands.
- Archibald Percy Long, OBE, Director of Forestry for Wales, Forestry Commission.
- Norman George McCulloch, Chairman of Council, British Cotton Industry Research Association.
- Agatha MacFarlane, MBE. For political and public services in Reigate.
- John Pringle Mackie, Managing Director, James Mackie & Sons Ltd., Belfast.
- Sydney Alan Stormer Malkin, MB, FRCS, Vice-Chairman, Portland Training College for the Disabled.
- Frank Thomas May, Assistant Secretary, Ministry of Materials.
- Alan Aird Moncrieff, MD, FRCP, Nuffield Professor of Child Health, London University.
- Arthur Claude Morrell, OBE, MC, JP, Deputy Chairman, Liverpool Savings Committee.
- John Cameron Andrieu Bingham Michael Morton, Journalist.
- Charles Henry Newble, OBE, Assistant Secretary, Ministry of Pensions.
- William Alfred Cyril Newman, OBE, Chemist and Assayer, Royal Mint.
- Arthur Gilbert Norris, OBE, Assistant Public Trustee.
- George William Olive, Headmaster, Dauntsey's School, West Lavington, Wiltshire.
- John Ormerod, OBE, BEM, Chief Constable, Wallasey Borough Police Force.
- Albert Stanley Pankhurst, Under Secretary, HM Treasury.
- Leslie Charles Bingham Penwill, Director and Secretary, Electrical Contractors' Association.
- Bernard William Phillips, OBE, Assistant Secretary, Ministry of Agriculture & Fisheries.
- Samuel Archibald Piggott, OBE, Principal Finance & Establishment Officer, Tithe Redemption Commission.
- Arthur Henry Powdrill, JP. For political and public services in Southampton.
- Joseph Proudman, Professor of Oceanography, University of Liverpool.
- John Anthony Quayle, Director of the Shakespeare Memorial Theatre, Stratford-on-Avon.
- Edwin Harold Rance, OBE, Grade 1 Officer, Branch B of the Foreign Service, Foreign Office.
- Michael Scudamore Redgrave, Actor.
- John Taylor Renton, Chairman, Agricultural Executive Committee for the Eastern area of Scotland.
- William John Richards, Chief Superintendent, Telecommunications Research Establishment, Ministry of Supply.
- Reginald Leslie Smith-Rose, Director of Radio Research, Department of Scientific & Industrial Research.
- William Ritchie Russell, MD, FRCP, Consultant Neurologist, Ministry of Pensions.
- Herbert Sammons, Managing Director, D. Napier & Son Ltd., Acton.
- William Savage, Works Director and Chief Engineer, Ruston-Bucyrus Ltd.
- Lawrence Henry Seccombe, Chairman, Seccombe, Marshall & Campion Ltd., London.
- Alfred Maymon Seed, Assistant Secretary, Board of Customs & Excise.
- Alice Havergal Skillicorn, Principal, Homerton Teachers Training College, Cambridge.
- Henry Martin Smith, OBE, HM Chief Inspector of Fire Services, Home Office.
- Leonard Maurice Snelling, Director of Contracts (Air), Ministry of Supply.
- Harold Ernest Snow, OBE, Deputy Director, Anglo-Iranian Oil Company, Ltd.
- Ralph Lang Southern, Accountant and Comptroller General, Board of Inland Revenue.
- James Gill Stewart, Assistant Secretary, Ministry of Labour & National Service.
- The Honourable Mary Christina, Mrs. Hornyold-Strickland, MBE, JP. For political and public services.
- William James Stuart, MB, FRCS(Ed), Chairman of the Executive Committee, Scottish National Blood Transfusion Association.
- John Newenham Summerson, Curator of Sir John Soane's Museum.
- Frank Sutcliffe, Manager, Constructive Department. HM Dockyard, Portsmouth.
- Hubert Sutton, Director of Materials Research & Development (Air), Ministry of Supply.
- Florence Mary Tann, Chief Inspector Ministry of Education.
- Henry Archibald Taylor. For political and public services in Leicester.
- Major George Thomson, DSO, Clerk of the Parliaments of Northern Ireland.
- Louis Melville Milne-Thomson, Professor of Mathematics, Royal Naval College, Greenwich.
- Frederick John Thurston, Clarinetist.
- Frederick James Tickner, Assistant Secretary, HM Treasury.
- Charles Bruce Townend, Chief Engineer, Main Drainage Department, Middlesex County Council.
- Donald Thomas Alfred Townend, Director-General, British Coal Utilisation Research Association.
- John Cumberland Landale Train, MC. Member, Railway Executive.
- Arthur David Waley. For services to the study of Chinese literature.
- Oliver Charles Watson, Director, Finance Division, Central Office of Information.
- Richard George Kitchener Way, Command Secretary, British Army of the Rhine.
- The Very Reverend Eric Milner-White, DSO, Dean of York. For services to the study of mediaeval glass.
- Harold Julius White, Vice-Chairman, Wool Textile Delegation.
- Percy George White, Finance Controller (Supply), Ministry of Food.
- Peter Humphrey St.John Wilson, Controller, Scotland, Ministry of Labour & National Service.
- William Campbell Wilson, Deputy Director of Finance, Ministry of Transport.
- Harry Bruce Woolfe. For services to the film industry.

- Henry Francis Ayres, British subject resident in Egypt.
- Kenneth Bumstead, Her Majesty's Consul-General at Shanghai.
- Colonel (temporary) William Robert MacFarlane Drew, OBE, MB, FRCP, RAMC, Lately Professor of Medicine, Royal Medical College, Bagdad.
- Alfred Hazell King, Her Majesty's Consul-General at Cairo.
- Gilbert Kingan, Manager in the United States of America for the London and Lancashire Insurance Co. Ltd.
- Peter Donald MacFeat, MC, Chief of Disposals Group, Control Commission for Germany (British Element).
- Gordon Stewart Nicoll, MBE, British subject until recently resident in Burma.
- Ralph Darrell Wilson, Her Majesty's Consul-General at Rotterdam.
- George Reid Crooks, MBE. For services to the United Kingdom business community in India.
- The Honourable Max Danziger, formerly Minister of Finance, Southern Rhodesia.
- Jean Daniel Arnauld Germond, OBE, First Assistant Secretary, Bechuanaland Protectorate.
- John Joseph Holland, MB, FRACS, JP. For public services, especially in connection with the ambulance service, in the State of Western Australia.
- Roy James McArthur. For public services in the State of Victoria.
- Thomas Francis Rice, General Manager, Government Produce Department, and Chairman, Supply and Tender Board, State of South Australia.
- Harry Durham Butterfield. For public services in Bermuda.
- Albert Harry Couzens, Commissioner of Labour, Nigeria.
- Colonel Aldington George Curphey, MBE, MG, ED, MD, CM. For public services in Jamaica.
- Joshua Price Edwards, Colonial Forest Service, Director of Forestry, Federation; of Malaya.
- Alfred William Frisby, Colonial Education Service, Director of Education, Singapore.
- David Middleton McDiarmid, Colonial Engineering Service, Director of Public Works, Federation of Malaya.
- Andrew Buchanan MacDonald, MBE, MB, ChB, Lately Superintendent, Itu Leper Colony, Church of Scotland Mission, Nigeria.
- Richard Bright Marke. For public services in Sierra Leone.
- Michael Sylvester O'Rorke, OBE, Colonial Police Service, Commissioner of Police, Kenya.
- William John Raatgever. For public services in British Guiana.
- William Frederick Stubbs, OBE, Colonial Administrative Service, Provincial Commissioner, (Secretariat), Northern Rhodesia.
- Samuel Swanson Tindall, Colonial Engineering Service, Acting Development Commissioner, Uganda.
- Charles Douglas Todd, OBE, Colonial Administrative Service, Financial Secretary, North Borneo.

==== Officer of the Order of the British Empire (OBE) ====
Military Division

Royal Navy

- Commander William Keith Buckley, VRD, Royal Navy Volunteer Reserve.
- Acting Captain (S) Alan Colquhoun Burnett.
- The Reverend Cyril Owen Amos Darby, Chaplain.
- Major (Quartermaster) Victor Wilson Davidson, MBE, Royal Marines.
- Commander William Edward James Eames, DSC.
- Instructor Commander John Percy Farmer.
- Commander (E) John Ivor Tennant Green.
- Commander (L) Cyril Charles Jerome.
- Commander Ernest Edward Jones.
- Commander (E) Louis Edward Stewart Holland Le Bailly.
- Surgeon Commander Dermot Francis Walsh, MB, BCh.

Army

- Lieutenant-Colonel (temporary) Evelyn Stanley Barkham (44808), Corps of Royal Engineers.
- Lieutenant-Colonel (temporary) Eric Spencer Batchelor, MC (113268), Royal Regiment of Artillery.
- Lieutenant-Colonel Thomas Crabtree Bayne, TD (12836), Royal Army Service Corps, Territorial Army.
- Lieutenant-Colonel John Hamilton Boag, MC, TD (68922), Royal Regiment of Artillery, Territorial Army.
- Lieutenant-Colonel (temporary) Rodney Clarence Mortimer Bond, MBE, MC (183980), Intelligence Corps.
- Lieutenant-Colonel (temporary) Vincent Alexander Prideaux Budge (62571), Grenadier Guards.
- Lieutenant-Colonel Godfrey Armstrong Caddick, TD (62375), Royal Regiment of Artillery, Territorial Army.
- Lieutenant-Colonel (temporary) (now Colonel (temporary)) Robert Caulfeild (37327), The King's Own Scottish Borderers.
- Lieutenant-Colonel John Hew Dalrymple (39195), The Duke of Wellington's Regiment (West Riding) (now retired).
- Lieutenant-Colonel James Ellis Evans, TD (72561), Royal Regiment of Artillery, Territorial Army.
- Lieutenant-Colonel Kenneth Arthur Peere Fergusson (40378), Royal Regiment of Artillery.
- Lieutenant-Colonel (temporary) James Grose, MC (47548), Royal Regiment of Artillery.
- Lieutenant-Colonel (Brevet Colonel) John Vickers Hall, MBE, TD (32723), Corps of Royal Electrical & Mechanical Engineers, Territorial Army (now TARO).
- Lieutenant-Colonel (temporary) Robert John Augustine Hornby (129033), The East Surrey Regiment.
- Lieutenant-Colonel (acting) Arthur Huck, TD (38958), Combined Cadet Force.
- Lieutenant-Colonel (temporary) Harry Rothney Hugo (378851), Royal Regiment of Artillery.
- Major David Eric Major Ingram (65557), Corps of Royal Engineers.
- Lieutenant-Colonel (temporary) Horace Travers Lake, MBE (120585), Corps of Royal Engineers.
- The Reverend John Smith Lawrie, MC (159231), Chaplain to the Forces, Second Class, Royal Army Chaplains Department, Territorial Army.
- Lieutenant-Colonel Ralph Walter Littlehales (20962), Employed List (late The Essex Regiment).
- Lieutenant-Colonel (temporary) Harold Tom May (242701), Royal Army Ordnance Corps.
- Major (temporary) Douglas Alfred Mitchell (188031), Corps of Royal Electrical & Mechanical Engineers.
- Lieutenant-Colonel (temporary) (local Colonel) Robert de la Hogue Moran (50937), The Duke of Wellington's Regiment (West Riding).
- Lieutenant-Colonel (acting) Frank Leslie Pettman (286354), Army Cadet Force.
- Lieutenant-Colonel (temporary) Francis James Claude Piggott, DSO (49931), The Queen's Royal Regiment (West Surrey).
- Lieutenant-Colonel (Quartermaster) John Henry Plumridge, MBE (76461), Royal Army Medical Corps.
- Lieutenant-Colonel William Rankin (44158), 7th Queen's Own Hussars, Royal Armoured Corps.
- Lieutenant-Colonel William Quincey Roberts, DSO, TD (56230), The Somerset Light Infantry (Prince Albert's), Territorial Army.
- Lieutenant-Colonel Lelanda Beckett Robinson (33749), The Royal Berkshire Regiment (Princess Charlotte of Wales's).
- Lieutenant-Colonel John Lilburn Sanderson, TD (95042), The Royal Northumberland Fusiliers, Territorial Army.
- Lieutenant-Colonel (temporary) Henry Arthur Shorricks (227542), Corps of Royal Engineers.
- Lieutenant-Colonel Margaret Joan, Lady Bowyer-Smyth, TD (192483), Women's Royal Army Corps, Territorial Army.
- Lieutenant-Colonel (temporary) Edward Shirley Trusler (161023), Corps of Royal Engineers.
- Lieutenant-Colonel (temporary) William Walford Whitnall (202633), Royal Army Ordnance Corps.
- Major (temporary) Eric John Younson (158444), Royal Regiment of Artillery.
- Lieutenant-Colonel Morley Robert Dalrymple Langley, MVO, Bechuanaland Protectorate Police.
- Lieutenant-Colonel John Cecil Tones, ED, Royal Rhodesia Regiment.

Royal Air Force

- Wing Commander Antony John Barwood, MRCS, LRCP (60981).
- Wing Commander Alfred Ambrose Baxter (46788), Royal Air Force Regiment.
- Wing Commander Eric Hugh Lynch-Blosse (33194).
- Wing Commander Ernest Osborne Budd (43895).
- Wing Commander Stanley Conway (43208).
- Wing Commander James Robert Fraser (43883).
- Wing Commander Geoffrey Valentine Fryer, AFC (37094).
- Wing Commander Douglas Hamilton Myles Graham (31061).
- Wing Commander Anthony Wilkinson Reward, DFC, AFC (39044).
- Wing-Commander Arthur Henry Charles Roberts, DSO, DFC (40431).
- Wing Commander George Emmott Tweddle (31354).
- Wing Commander Philip Edmund Warcup (33294).
- Wing Commander Cecil Mark Williams (35208).
- Wing Commander James Woods (35114).
- Acting Wing Commander Leonard Frank Jennings (43447).
- Acting Wing Commander Irving Stanley Smith, DFC (43048).
- Squadron Leader Kenneth Charles Giddings, DFC, AFC (113414).
- Squadron Leader Donald Darroch McSwein (108732), Royal Auxiliary Air Force Regiment.

Civil Division

- Sam Philip Abrams, Director, Nelson Wear Ltd., Birmingham, Chairman of the Light Clothing Federation.
- Frank Matthew Adams, Press Officer, Cabinet Secretariat, Northern Ireland.
- Frederick Aldous, Export Manager, British American Tobacco Co.
- Norman Carrick Anderson, Secretary, West of Scotland Textile and other Scottish Employers' Associations.
- Norman Bradshaw Ashworth, Principal Consultative Officer, Milk Division, Ministry of Food.
- Frederick John Baguley, First Assistant Chief Constable, Birmingham City Police Force.
- Humphrey George Ambrose Baker, Lately Secretary, Commons, Open Spaces & Footpaths Preservation Society.
- Richard Owen Banister, Divisional Operating Superintendent, Manchester, Railway Executive.
- Erik Edward Barnett, Regional House Coal Officer, House Coal Distribution (Emergency) Scheme.
- Denis William Bates, Chief Officer, Glamorganshire Fire Brigade.
- Victor Bates, Lately Controller of Finance, Forestry Commission.
- Paul Beard, Principal First Violin, British Broadcasting Corporation Symphony Orchestra.
- Richard Belford, Principal, Ministry of Materials.
- William Frederick Porteous Bell, Chief Executive Officer, Scottish Education Department.
- Frank Wellings Benson, Assistant Regional Controller, Eastern Region, Ministry of Labour & National Service.
- Captain Norman Black. For political and public services in Cornwall.
- Harry Blackman, Director, National Federation of Plumbers & Domestic Engineers (Employers).
- Alexander Blue, JP. For political and public services in Glasgow.
- Kenneth Christopher Boswell, TD, Principal Lecturer in Modern Studies, Royal Military Academy, Sandhurst.
- Kenneth William Braid, Professor of Botany, West of Scotland Agricultural College, Glasgow.
- Herbert Archbold Brechin. For political and public services in Edinburgh.
- William Joseph Breething, Head of News Output, British Broadcasting Corporation.
- Richard Archibald Briggs, Principal Inspector of Taxes, Board of Inland Revenue.
- George Percy Brightwell, Deputy Building Construction Adviser, Ministry of Supply.
- Michael Broderick, JP, lately Regional Director, Midland Region, Ministry of Fuel & Power.
- Frank Brookhouse, Technical Advisor to the Director of Victualling, Admiralty.
- Jack Brooks, Principal Scientific Officer, Low Temperature Research Station, Department of Scientific & Industrial Research.
- Charlotte Gertrude Brown, JP. For political and public services in Leicestershire.
- Ernest Richard Brown, Chief Engineer Officer, SS Swainby, Sir R. Ropner & Co. (Management), Ltd.
- John Edward Stevenson Browne, Chief Constable of Nottinghamshire.
- Ulric Clifford Brunner, lately Secretary of the Schools Music Association of Great Britain.
- Lieutenant-Colonel Donald Pearson Bryce, TD, Secretary, Territorial and Auxiliary Forces Association of the West Riding.
- Commander Henry Buckle, AM, Royal Navy (Retd.), Whale Fishery Inspector, Ministry of Agriculture & Fisheries.
- Robert Bunnett, Alderman, King's Lynn.
- Walter Burrows, Chief Executive Officer, Ministry of Transport.
- Horace Trinley Bush, JP, Alderman, Cheltenham Borough Council.
- Alderman Albert Campbell. For public services in Accrington.
- Leslie Carnie, Assistant Chief Inspector, Immigration Branch, Home Office.
- Herbert Carr, County Architect and County Planning Officer, Montgomeryshire.
- James Carr, MBE, MC, Area General Manager, South Western Gas Board.
- The Honourable Isabel Ida Gordon Catto, President of London Division, Young Women's Christian Association.
- George Watson Chandler, MM, Deputy City Engineer and Surveyor, Birmingham.
- George Chesney, MD. For services as Medical Officer of Health for Poole.
- Charles Wilfrid Childs, Senior Architect, Ministry of Education.
- Joseph Edmund Clarke, Assistant Regional Controller, Scotland, Ministry of Labour & National Service.
- Andrew Thomas Jamieson Cluness, MM, Rector of Anderson Educational Institute, Lerwick, Shetland.
- Leonard George Covell, Finance Director, Potato Division, Ministry of Food.
- Captain William John Craig, Captain, Stratocruiser and Constellation Fleet, British Overseas Airways Corporation.
- Eveline Maud Crothers, Lately General Superintendent, Queen's Institute of District Nursing.
- Bernard Charles Curling, Lately Secretary, Institute of Marine Engineers.
- Henry Thomas Curtis, Assistant Regional Controller, Northern Region, Ministry of National Insurance.
- Alderman Frederick William Adcock Cushman. For public services in Hove, Sussex.
- Henry Gethin Davey, Works General Manager, Atomic Energy Production Factory, Sellafield, Ministry of Supply.
- Wilfred Charles Day, Principal, Command Secretariat, Middle East Land Forces, War Office.
- The Reverend William MacDonald Dempster, Secretary, Church of Scotland Committee on Hut and Canteen Work for HM Forces.
- John Francis Arthur Dimes, Telecommunications Controller, Home Counties Region, General Post Office.
- Harold George Dorey, Deputy Regional Director, London Postal Region, General Post Office.
- William Douglas. For political services in Northern Ireland.
- Henrietta Newton Driver, MBE, Chairman of the Newton Driver Services Club, Rustington.
- Stanley Dumbbell, Registrar, University of Liverpool.
- Robert Dundas Duncan, Chief Engineer, Ministry of Health & Local Government, Northern Ireland.
- Frank Headland East. For political and public services in London.
- Thomas Humphrey Edwards, Chief Livestock Inspector and Livestock Adviser, Ministry of Food.
- Philip James Ellis, Managing Director, R.B. Pullin & Co. Ltd., Brentford.
- Herbert Emerson, MC, MB, Senior Medical Officer, Ministry of Pensions.
- Kenneth Richard Evans, Manager, Education Department, Metropolitan-Vickers Co. Ltd.
- Roland John Falk, AFC, Test Pilot, A.V. Roe & Co. Ltd.
- Jane Page Ferlie, MBE, Matron, Simpson Memorial Maternity Pavilion, Royal Infirmary, Edinburgh.
- Joseph Manning Ford, Senior Principal Scientific Officer, Admiralty Gunnery Establishment, Teddington, Middlesex.
- Harvey George Frost, Chairman, Bury St. Edmunds & District Employment Committee.
- Francis Matthew Fuller, Divisional Engineer, London County Council.
- William Georges Fuller, Assistant Accountant-General, Ministry of Labour & National Service.
- Alma Juliet Pauline Gibbons, JP. For political and public services in the West Midlands.
- Theodore Harold Gill, Senior Radio Engineer, Headquarters, 90 Group, Royal Air Force, Farnborough.
- Beatrice Anne Godwin, Assistant General Secretary, Clerical & Administrative Workers' Union.
- Wyndham Sweyn Goodden. For services to the Council of Industrial Design in Scotland.
- Eric Towers Grainger, Engineer, Grade I, Engineering Division, Ministry of Supply.
- Samuel Abraham Gratton, JP, Deputy Chairman, Glasgow Corporation.
- Herbert Alec Graves, Agricultural Manager, Bechuanaland Cattle Ranch, Colonial Development Corporation.
- Anne Jane Gray, Regional Controller, Eastern Region, National Assistance Board.
- Eric Grundy, Manager, Ferranti Ltd., Moston, Manchester.
- Richard Ernest Hadley, Chief Engineer Officer, SS Velutina, Anglo-Saxon Petroleum Company Ltd.
- Robert Paxton Haines, Senior Civil Engineer, War Office.
- Frank Charles Handford, MBE, Chief Clerk, Forestry Commission, Scotland.
- George James Harvey, Principal, Ministry of National Insurance.
- Rupert Alan Hatfield, Chairman, Burton-on-Trent & District Local Employment Committee and Disablement Advisory Committee.
- John Montgomerie Hattrick, Managing Director, Potash Ltd.
- Reginald Edward Cecil Hawkins, Deputy Director of Contracts, Ministry of Works.
- Robert Higgins, Assistant Professor of Metallurgy, University College, Swansea.
- William Ewart Hocking, MBE, Principal, Ministry of Transport.
- Ralph Homan. For political services in Wessex.
- Wilfred Vivian Howells, MRCS, LRCP, Member of Central Health Services Council.
- John Owen Hughes, Principal Scientific Officer, Royal Aircraft Establishment, Farnborough, Ministry of Supply.
- John Williams Hughes, MBE, Chairman, Horrisey, Wood Green & District War Pensions Committee, Gladstone Hurford, Lately Secretary, United Birmingham Hospitals.
- George William Huxham, First Class Valuer, Board of Inland Revenue.
- William Alfred Jackson, Director, Telephone Manufacturing Co. Ltd.
- Thomas Frederick Edwin Jakeman, MBE, Chairman, South West Regional Advisory Savings Committee.
- Stefan Kenneth Janson, Engineer, Grade I, Armament Design Establishment, Ministry of Supply.
- Ernest Jesty, MBE, Chairman, Alresford Savings Committee, Hampshire.
- Dennis Daniel Borthwick Johnson, Government Representative, Liverpool & London War Risks Insurance Association Ltd.
- George Conrad Johnson, Deputy Provincial Director, National Agricultural Advisory Service, Eastern Province, Ministry of Agriculture & Fisheries.
- Edward Bernard Jones, Secretary, Cammell Laird & Co. Ltd., Birkenhead.
- Captain Eric George, Jones, MBE, Chairman, Northern Area, British Legion.
- Charles Kelly, MC, Deputy Regional Controller, London (Outer) Region, Ministry of National Insurance.
- Douglas Neil Kennedy, MBE, Director, English Folk Dance & Song Society.
- Sylvia Beatrice Kennedy, President, Scottish Women's Rural Institutes.
- Violet Enid Kennedy. For political and public services in Lancashire, Cheshire and Westmorland.
- Leonard Castleton Knight, Producer and General Manager of Gaumont British News.
- Stanley Harold Knight, Principal, General Post Office.
- Bertram Knowlden, Telephone Manager, Nottingham, General Post Office.
- John Joseph Landers, MB, BCh, Principal Medical Officer, HM Prison Service.
- Bernard George Lane, Principal, Board of Trade.
- Mabel Gordon Lawson, MB, ChB, Deputy Chief Nursing Officer, Ministry of Health.
- Herbert Lee. For political and public services in Bradford.
- Robert Hurley Lucas, Secretary, Printers' Pension Corporation.
- George Andrew McFarland, County Inspector, Royal Ulster Constabulary.
- William McFarlane, Chief Generation Engineer (Operation), South West Scotland Division, British Electricity Authority.
- Walter Cowley McHarrie, Headmaster, Fairfield Road Secondary Boys' School, Poplar.
- William Mackie McKechnie, MBE, Chief Constable, Greenock Burgh Police Force.
- James Robert McKerrow, Chief Contracts Officer, Ministry of Fuel & Power.
- Robert Alexander Maddock, Chairman of North Staffordshire Industrial Savings Committee.
- Adrian Bernard Mann, Assistant Chief Engineer, Ministry of Works.
- Edward George Marsden, MBE, Secretary, Railway Executive.
- Kenneth Charles Harry Martin, Deputy Chief Surveyor, Air Ministry.
- Horace Wills Mawson. For political and public services in Carlisle.
- Arthur Barry Proger Meggitt, JP. For political and public services in South Wales.
- Edward George Melville, Chief Executive Officer, HM Treasury.
- Reginald Taverner Miller, Foreign Office.
- Guy Patrick Milton, Staff Controller, General Post Office.
- John Mitchell, Principal Clerk of Session, Court of Session, Scotland.
- Amy Catherine Moore, Headmistress, Arnold High School, Blackpool.
- Mary Morris, Member, Government Local Offices Committee.
- Noel Spencer Nairne, MRCS, LRCP, Medical Officer, Ministry of Transport.
- James Murray Napier, County Commissioner, County of London, Boy Scouts Association.
- Ewart Arthur Netting, Grade 2 Officer, Branch B of the Foreign Service, Foreign Office.
- George Noble, JP, Manager of Fawley Refinery, Esso Petroleum Co.
- Thomas Eugene North, Architect and Planning Officer, West Ham County Borough.
- Richard George Odell, Chairman, R.G. Odell Ltd., Shepperton.
- Maude Holmes-Orr. For political and public services in Bedfordshire.
- Edwin Peat, Chairman, Chesterfield District Committee, Derby Agricultural Executive Committee.
- Reginald Arthur Phillips, Deputy Controller, Home Division, British Council.
- William James Phillips, MBE, Principal Accountant, Admiralty.
- Wing Commander Clement Allin Pike, AFC, RAFVR (Retd.), Chairman, No.220 (St Albans) Squadron and No.2203 (Hatfield) Squadron, Air Training Corps.
- Alan Anderson Pratt, Chairman of Directors, Southern Oil Co. Ltd.
- William Pratt, DSO, Lately Higher Collector, Board of Customs & Excise.
- Captain Robert Campbell Proctor, Master, SS British Prince, Prince Line Ltd.
- John Ap Rees, Principal, Board of Customs & Excise.
- John Reid, Secretary and Administrative Director, Edinburgh Festival Society Ltd.
- Thomas Joseph Reilly, Assistant Regional Controller, Southern Region, Ministry of National Insurance.
- John Arthur Robertson, Director of Cold Storage Division, Ministry of Food.
- Charles Stanley Roscoe, lately Admiralty Marshal, Supreme Court of Judicature.
- Colonel Derek Dealing Rothschild, MBE, TD, Director, Louis Newmark Ltd., Croydon.
- Edgar Schofield, Superintending Civil Engineer, Grade I, Air Ministry.
- William Sellers, MBE, Director of the Colonial Film Unit, Colonial Office.
- Francesca Helen Shepherd, Lately Principal, Board of Trade.
- Francis Lawrence Shepherd, Special Director, Dorman Long & Co. Ltd.
- Lettice Silverston, Assistant Secretary, Ministry of Supply.
- John Thompson Wigham Smeal, Chief Rural Officer, National Council of Social Service.
- Cecil Holyday Hills Smith, Principal Regional Officer, Bristol, Ministry of Housing & Local Government.
- Alderman James Harry Smith, JP. For public services in Dartmouth.
- Robert Mansell Smith, JP. For public services in Stratford-on-Avon.
- John Spalding, Headmaster, Royal Schools for the Deaf, Manchester.
- Geoffrey Ward Stallibrass, Deputy Director of Control and Navigation (Development), Ministry of Civil Aviation.
- John Edward Horatio Steegman, Keeper of the Department of Art National Museum of Wales.
- Cyril Ridgeway Stephens, National President, British Limbless Ex-Service Men's Association.
- William Stockdale, JP, Chairman, North Shields & District Employment Committee and Disablement Advisory Committee.
- Gaius Alexander Stone, Controller and Licence Officer, Worcestershire County Council.
- Henry Benjamin Stone, Chairman, Nottingham Food Control Committee.
- Ross Lewis Stubbs, Secretary, British Non-Ferrous Smelters Association.
- John Frederick Swindells, Superintending Naval Store Officer (Higher Scale), HM Dockyard, Portsmouth.
- Albert Richard Swinnerton, Principal, Commonwealth Relations Office.
- Geoffrey Timms, Foreign Office.
- John Douglas Todd, Registrar of Companies, Board of Trade.
- Winifred Torrance, County Director, Nottinghamshire Branch, British Red Cross Society.
- Percival Turner, Chief Examiner, Estate Duty Office, Board of Inland Revenue.
- William Read Wadsworth, JP, Chairman, Macclesfield Local Employment Committee and Disablement Advisory Committee.
- Lester Walker, Controller, Statistical Office, Board of Customs & Excise.
- Wilfred Walker, MBE, Chairman, Horsforth Savings Committee, Leeds.
- Frank Kingdon-Ward. For services in the introduction of Asiatic plants.
- Sarah Adelaide Ward, Member of Parliament for Cannock, 1931–1935. For political and public services in Staffordshire.
- Thomas Charles Ward. For public services in Shropshire.
- Henry George Warren, Planning Inspector (Lately Senior Inspector), Ministry of Housing & Local Government.
- Thomas Alfred-Waterhouse, President, National Federation of Anglers.
- Albert Watson, Director, Ministry of Pensions.
- Francis Cornforth Watts, MM, TD, Chief Inspector of Training, Ministry of Labour & National Service.
- Frederick John West. For political and public services in the Home Counties.
- Thomas Robertson West, Lately Managing Director, C. & H. Crichton Ltd.
- Alderman John Whiston. For public services in Walsall, Staffordshire.
- Ian Dunn Whyte, Conductor, British Broadcasting Corporation Scottish Orchestra.
- Harry Emlyn Williams, Senior Inspector of Taxes, Board of Inland Revenue.
- Leslie Hugh Wilson, City Architect and Planning Officer, Canterbury.
- Kathleen Mary Worster Worster, Resident Warden, Bishop Creighton House, Fulham.
- Stanley Hurst Worthington, Director of Civic Welfare, Salford.
- Percy Leonard Wostear, Lately Assistant Director, Radio Production, Ministry of Supply.
- Francis Rowland Yerbury, Director, the Building Centre, London.
- Major Werner Carl Rudolph Aue, First Secretary at Her Majesty's Embassy in Brussels.
- Sydney John Joseph Blackburne, British subject resident in Austria.
- Rose Caroline Fitzpatrick, British subject resident in the Lebanon.
- Lieutenant-Commander Clement James Gordon, Royal Navy (Retd.), Lately Assistant Chief, British Police Mission to Greece.
- Maxwell Frederick Arthur Keen, Clerk to the Legislative Assembly, Sudan.
- Richard Wilson Olavarria Le Bas, British subject resident in the Argentine Republic.
- Donald Paton Malyn, MBE. Manager, Barclays Bank (Dominion, Colonial and Overseas), Cairo.
- Kenneth McCrae, British subject resident in Brazil.
- Allan Goth Michelsen, Lately First Secretary (Information) at Her Majesty's Legation in Berne.
- Charles Clayton-Ray, British subject resident in Spain.
- Kenneth Brebner Ross, Lately General Refineries Manager, Anglo-Iranian Oil Co., Persia.
- Humphrey Gerald Sullivan, British Resident, Lübeck, Control Commission for Germany (British Element).
- Aneurin David Thomas, British Council Representative in Norway.
- Richard Archibald Fawcett Wallis, lately First Secretary (Information) at Her Majesty's Embassy in Lima.
- Andrew Rodger Waterston, Entomological Adviser to the Development Division of the British Middle East Office, Beirut.
- Michael Willcocks, Manager, Anglo-Egyptian Oilfields Ltd Refinery, Suez.
- The Reverend John Evan Gwyn Thomas Williams, Principal Chaplain, Control Commission for Germany (British Element).
- Edmund Thomas Daly. For municipal and public services in the State of South Australia.
- Edward Doyle. For public services in the State of Victoria.
- Philip Haviland Haviland, Director of Irrigation, Southern Rhodesia.
- Claude Hotchin, JP. For services to Art in the State of Western Australia.
- Cyril Thomas Mason. For services to the United Kingdom community in Lahore, Pakistan.
- Colonel James Allin Methuen. For public services in Southern Rhodesia.
- John Reynolds Stebbing, MBE, Government Secretary, Swaziland.
- William James Underwood, Honorary Treasurer of many charitable institutions in Southern Rhodesia.
- Denys Henry Rene Vollet, MB, ChB, Director of Medical Services, Basutoland.
- Eric Wilkinson, Honorary Chairman, Bombay European Hospital Trust.
- The Reverend Gaddiel Robert Acquaah, Chairman of the Gold Coast Methodist Church.
- Stanley Percival Luther Beaumont, Colonial Administrative Service, Acting Civil Secretary, Eastern Region, Nigeria.
- Donovan Benson. For social services in Hong Kong.
- Edward William Box, Superintendent of Bananas, Cameroons Development Corporation, Nigeria.
- Robert Tatton Brown, Colonial Administrative Service, Assistant Chief Secretary, Aden.
- Archdeacon George Burton, Church Missionary Society, Ondo Province, Nigeria.
- David Arthur Butler. For public services in Fiji.
- Harold Ernest Chudleigh, Commissioner of Labour, Cyprus.
- Terence Bertrand Comissiong, MBE, Assistant Administrator, Grenada, Windward Islands.
- Arthur Cooper, Colonial Police Service, Senior Superintendent of Police, Nigeria.
- Norman Craig, Colonial Agricultural Service, Deputy Director of Agriculture, Mauritius.
- Bernard Stratton Davis, Colonial Administrative Service, Officer Class IB, Malayan Civil Service.
- Francis Philip Louis Derriman, Colonial Audit Service, Director of Audit, Sierra Leone.
- Michael Geoffrey Dewinton, MC, Colonial Legal Service, Crown Counsel, Nigeria.
- Harold Owen Ellis, Postmaster-General, Nyasaland.
- William Foulsham, MC, Colonial Administrative Service, District Officer, Federation of Malaya.
- Walter Ogle Fraser, Deputy Colonial Treasurer, British Guiana.
- Herbert Charles Fuller. For public services in British Honduras.
- Professor Victor Caruana Galizia. For public services in Malta.
- Edmund Austin Gardiner, Colonial Engineering Service, Director of Public Works, Singapore.
- Alan Girling, JP. For public services in Northern Rhodesia.
- Solomon Hochoy, Commissioner of Labour, Trinidad.
- William Harvey Cox-Horn, JP. For public services in the Federation of Malaya.
- Alfred Charles Henry Illston, Deputy Chief Engineer, Mechanical Engineering Department, Office of the Crown Agents for the Colonies.
- Kenneth Raymond Ingraham, Director of Telecommunications, Bahamas.
- John Douglas Jameson, Colonial Agricultural Service, Senior Botanist; Department of Agriculture, Uganda.
- Lee Iu Cheung, MBE, JP. For public services in Hong Kong.
- Alec Lonsdale Le Maitre. For public services in Tanganyika.
- Violet Mary Victoria Luscombe, Queen Elizabeth's Colonial Nursing Service, Principal Matron, Gold Coast.
- Colonel Reginald Townend Michelin, Colonial Police Service, Commissioner of Police, Barbados.
- John Noel Mason Ashplant Nicholls, Colonial Police Service, Acting Senior Assistant Commissioner of Police, Federation of Malaya.
- Clifford Ogilvie, Managing Director of Meru Tin Limited, Ipoh, Federation of Malaya.
- John Dudley Pollett, Colonial Geological Survey Service, Director of Geological Survey, Sierra Leone.
- Harvey Spurgeon Purchase, PhD, FRCVS, lately Chief Veterinary Research Officer, Kenya.
- John Riseborough, Town Clerk, City of Nairobi, Kenya.
- Kenneth Lesreaulx Sanders, Director of Labour & Welfare, Gibraltar.
- Ivor Otterbein Smith, Lately Commissioner of the Cayman Islands, now Senior District Commissioner, British Guiana.
- Mary Stuart. For social and welfare services in Uganda.
- Sydney Frederick Turner, Colonial Survey Service, Director of Surveys and Land, Northern Rhodesia.

Honorary Officers

- Teo Yew Whee, Dato Maha Kurnia. For public services in the Federation of Malaya.
- Adegunle Soetan, the Aro of Kemta, Abeokuta. For public services in Nigeria.
- Balaam Jaberi Mukasa, Katikiro of Bunyoro, Uganda.

==== Member of the Order of the British Empire (MBE) ====
Military Division

Royal Navy

- Temporary Lieutenant-Commander (Sp.) Harold Daniel Caslon, Royal Navy Volunteer Reserve.
- Lieutenant (S) Ernest Alfred Cloutman.
- Lieutenant (E) Frederick Stephen Cocking, (Retd.)
- Communication Lieutenant Walter Luke Driver, (Retd.)
- Acting Lieutenant-Commander Richard Ian Gilchrist, RNVR.
- Lieutenant John Henry Harvey-Jones.
- Commissioned Communication Officer Charles John Joseph Kemp.
- Captain Eric William King, Royal Marines.
- Lieutenant (L) Claude Colin Kitt, (Retd.)
- Lieutenant-Commander Peter Lawrence Mortimer, DSC.
- Lieutenant (E) William John Pelley.
- Wardmaster Lieutenant Sidney Jack Tyler, (Retd.)

Army

- Major (temporary) Frederick John Andrews (239951), Royal Army Service Corps.
- No. 5107412 Warrant Officer Class II Jack Kitchener Angel, Corps of Royal Military Police.
- No. 815723 Warrant Officer Class I Sidney Francis James Batchelor, MM, Royal Regiment of Artillery.
- No. 2656193 Warrant Officer Class II Harold Godfrey Bryant, Coldstream Guards.
- Captain Sydney Buck (258311), The Manchester Regiment.
- Major (acting) Dudley Watson Chapman (310182), Army Cadet Force.
- No. S/57830 Warrant Officer Class I Ernest Cope, Royal Army Service Corps.
- No. 1867686 Warrant Officer Class I Harry John Cox, Royal Army Pay Corps.
- No. 22206856 Warrant Officer Class II William Anderson Cummings, The Queen's Own Yorkshire Dragoons, Royal Armoured Corps, Territorial Army.
- No. 4469177 Warrant Officer Class I Thomas Duffy, The Royal Welch Fusiliers.
- Major Charles Edwin Eley, TD (88446), The North Staffordshire Regiment (The Prince of Wales's), Territorial Army.
- No. 2694169 Warrant Officer Class I Donald McGregor Fraser, Scots Guards.
- No. 3706141 Warrant Officer Class II Robert Herbert Gardner, The King's Own Royal Regiment (Lancaster), Territorial Army.
- Captain James McDonald Glass (202699), Royal Corps of Signals.
- Major Frederick Whitcombe Grant (175020), Royal Army Pay Corps.
- Major (temporary) Harry Charles Stephen Gregory (386003), 10th Princess Mary's Own Ghurka Rifles.
- Major (temporary) Harold Hall (282053), The Black Watch (Royal Highland Regiment).
- Major (temporary)Harry George Thomas Harris (227122), Corps of Royal Engineers.
- Major Albert Joseph Hartridge (92372), Royal Army Ordnance Corps.
- Captain (acting) Michael Harper Heppenstall (350077), Army Cadet Force.
- Major (local Lieutenant-Colonel) John Enos Holton (230319), Royal Regiment of Artillery.
- Major (temporary) William Ernest Bruce-Jones, TD (74179), The South Staffordshire Regiment.
- No. 1867116 Warrant Officer Class I Joseph Arthur David Kirby, Corps of Royal Engineers.
- No. 22221849 Warrant Officer Class II William Thomas Joseph Lane, The Middlesex Regiment (Duke of Cambridge's Own).
- Major Richard Cumberland Laughton (63514), Royal Regiment of Artillery.
- No. 1059421 Warrant Officer Class I Edward Leavers, Royal Regiment of Artillery.
- Major Frederick George Lillycrop (78893), Corps of Royal Electrical & Mechanical Engineers.
- Major (acting) Andrew Livingston (280381), Army Cadet Force.
- Major (Quartermaster) John Robert Lovesey (138902), The Northamptonshire Regiment.
- No. 5614770 Warrant Officer Class I Frederick Harwood Luck, Royal Regiment of Artillery.
- Major (temporary) Rex Charles Mace (380181), Royal Regiment of Artillery.
- Major (Quartermaster) Clifford George Macey (74089), The Royal Inniskilling Fusiliers, attached The Parachute Regiment, Territorial Army.
- Major (temporary) John Alfred Mansi (152780), Army Physical Training Corps.
- Major (Quartermaster) William Bain Marjoribanks, TD (88574), The Gordon Highlanders, Territorial Army.
- Major Richard Arthur Newsum, TD (70388), The Royal Lincolnshire Regiment, Territorial Army (now TARO).
- Major (temporary) Philip Sidney Newton (108180), The Royal Sussex Regiment.
- Major (temporary) Roger Frederick Nixon (117154), The King's Royal Rifle Corps.
- Major John Henry Alexander Patton, MC, TD (48900), Royal Corps of Signals, Territorial Army (seconded to University Training Corps).
- Major William Donald Pickett (378427), Royal Regiment of Artillery.
- Major Thomas Frederick Plumpton (333670), Royal Tank Regiment, Royal Armoured Corps, Territorial Army.
- Major Wallace Keith Pryke (62133), The Green Howards (Alexandra, Princess of Wales's Own Yorkshire Regiment).
- No. 775454 Warrant Officer Class II William Alfred George Ralph, The Dorset Regiment.
- Major (temporary) Anthony Richard Reeve, TD (85785), Royal Regiment of Artillery.
- No. 797146 Warrant Officer Class I (acting) Gabriel Edward Reeves, Royal Regiment of Artillery.
- Major Victor George Rushworth (128029), Royal Corps of Signals.
- No. S/6798 Warrant Officer Class I Frederick Albert Sadd, Royal Army Service Corps.
- No. 3806 Warrant Officer Class II Espedito Sammut, Royal Malta Artillery.
- No. 812060 Warrant Officer Class I John Joseph Sankey, Royal Regiment of Artillery, Territorial Army.
- Major Terence Percy Shaw (56165), The Lancashire Fusiliers.
- No. S/6009667 Warrant Officer Class I George Richard Shearman, Royal Army Service Corps.
- Major Reginald James Sheridan (119364), Corps of Royal Engineers.
- Major (temporary) Leslie Ernest Slow (150456), Royal Army Service Corps.
- No. 4535113 Warrant Officer Class II Albert Arthur Spink, The West Yorkshire Regiment (The Prince of Wales's Own).
- Major (Quartermaster) Harry Walter Munro Stewart (74090), Royal Army Medical Corps (seconded to Extra Regimentally Employed List).
- No. W/24807 Warrant Officer Class II Margaret Sutherland, Women's Royal Army Corps.
- Major Alasdair Arthur Noel Tuck (378167), 10th Royal Hussars (Prince of Wales's Own), Royal Armoured Corps.
- Captain (temporary) Annie Leonard Turnbull (378453), Women's Royal Army Corps.
- Major (Quartermaster) Richard Edward Turner (181031), Royal Tank Regiment, Royal Armoured Corps.
- Major (Electrical Mechanical Assistant Engineer) Arthur James Weaver (119108), Corps of Royal Electrical & Mechanical Engineers (now retired).
- No. 2654977 Warrant Officer Class II Fred Whitehead, Coldstream Guards.
- Major (temporary) John Ludlow Whitmore (375859), Royal Army Medical Corps.
- Major (Quartermaster) William Charles Wickenden (113838), Corps of Royal Engineers.
- Captain Elsie May Williams (236983), Women's Royal Army Corps, Territorial Army.
- Major (temporary) Douglas Henry Woodcock (189078), Royal Army Service Corps.
- Major The Lord Wynford (71130), The Royal Welch Fusiliers.
- Captain Robert Cardwell (EC.15932), Special List (ex-Indian Army) (at present on loan to the Government of India).
- Captain Patricia Mary Wibberley, Women's Military & Air Service, Southern Rhodesia.

Royal Air Force

- Squadron Leader Douglas Bower (134060), Royal Air Force.
- Squadron Leader Ronald Arthur Cooper (45814), Royal Air Force.
- Squadron Leader Percival John Maddaford (44771), Royal Air Force.
- Acting Squadron Leader Andrezej Boguslaw Chmielowiec (500266), Royal Air Force.
- Flight Lieutenant Ronald Julian Moss Baron (201363), Royal Air Force.
- Flight Lieutenant George Cairns (178032), Royal Air Force.
- Flight Lieutenant Lawrence Claude Elliott (46426), Royal Air Force.
- Flight Lieutenant William Maurice Granville Gosden (105899), Royal Air Force.
- Flight Lieutenant Horatio John Hillyard (124950) Royal Air Force.
- Flight Lieutenant William Hurst (56280), Royal Air Force.
- Flight Lieutenant Alexander Blair Landells, DFC (184630), Royal Air Force.
- Flight Lieutenant Robert Anthony Langton (172055), Royal Air Force.
- Flight Lieutenant James Henry Lenaghan, DFC (186480), Royal Air Force.
- Flight Lieutenant Timothy Jackson Millar (64069), Royal Air Force Volunteer Reserve.
- Flight Lieutenant Donald William Munro, BEM (50364), Royal Air Force.
- Flight Lieutenant Sidney Frederick Oliver (172799), Royal Air Force.
- Flight Lieutenant William Dunn Reid (51307), Royal Air Force.
- Flight Lieutenant Jack Bardsley Murray Stableford (113013), Royal Air Force.
- Flight Lieutenant William Henry Wheeler (52873), Royal Air Force.
- Captain Brynmore Gibbons, Southern Rhodesia Air Force.
- Acting Flight Lieutenant Ivan Smith (66872), Royal Air Force Volunteer Reserve.
- Acting Flight Lieutenant Robert Armfield Wigelsworth, DFC (133363), Royal Auxiliary Air Force.
- Mulazim Abdullah Musa Audhali (3534), Aden Protectorate Levies.
- Warrant Officer Thomas Allen (2676800), Royal Auxiliary Air Force.
- Warrant Officer James Ballantyne (365162), Royal Air Force.
- Warrant Officer Mary Eleanor Lewis (881746), Women's Royal Air Force.
- Warrant Officer Archibald McAllister (506337), Royal Air Force.
- Warrant Officer Hilda Marjorie North (883803), Women's Royal Air Force.
- Warrant Officer Aubrey Reece Islwyn Rawlings (590823), Royal Air Force.
- Warrant Officer Leslie Walter George Smith (590739), Royal Air Force.
- Warrant Officer Thomas Henry Thomason (590382), Royal Air Force.

Civil Division

- Laura Frances Ainsworth, Chairman, Women's Section, Northern Area, British Legion.
- James Alexander. For services to the Glasgow Committee of the Scottish Veterans Garden City Association.
- Florence Mary Andrews. For political and public services in Oxford.
- Frederick Charles Andrews, Lately Senior Executive Officer, Commonwealth Relations Office.
- William Andrews, Chairman, Northern Cricket Union of Ireland.
- Samuel Moore Anketell, JP, Chairman, Antrim & District Savings Committee, Co. Antrim.
- George Ernest Ansell, Master Superintendent, Royal Army Service Corps Fleet, War Office.
- Gwendoline Gladys Arey, Private Secretary to the Managing Director, Birmingham Small Arms Company Ltd., (Small Heath Group).
- George Cecil Ashworth, Senior Executive Officer, Ministry of Supply.
- Albert Henry Attrill, Civil Engineer, Admiralty.
- William Henry Bailey, Principal Foreman of Storehouses, Admiralty.
- Edwina Baker, Higher Executive Officer, Ministry of Civil Aviation.
- Herbert Francis Baker, Accountant, Board of Customs & Excise.
- Alfred Richard William Barber, Senior Executive Officer, Ministry of Pensions.
- Herbert Douglas Barlow, Lately Senior Officer, Grade III, Council of Industrial Design.
- William Frederick Barnett, Chief Executive Officer, Ministry of Supply.
- Thomas Barratt, Chief Superintendent, Criminal Investigation Department, Metropolitan Police Force.
- Stanley Settles Barrett, Staff Officer, Board of Customs & Excise.
- Frank Frederick Batcheldor, Works Director, Small Electric Motors Ltd., Beckenham, Kent.
- Henry Batchelor, Skipper of the Steam Trawler Alafoss.
- Henry Ernest Bate, Higher Executive Officer, Ministry of Materials.
- Charles Edward Beedham, Undermanager, East Midlands Division, National Coal Board.
- Harry Billbrough, Chief Engineer, Bagley & Co. Ltd., Knottingley.
- Frederick Arthur Binden, Assistant Manager, Cable & Wireless Section, London Telecommunications Region, General Post Office.
- Eliza Bird. For political and public services in County Durham.
- George Walter Bird, Secretary, National Federation of Fruit & Potato Trades Ltd.
- George Henry Bishop, Executive Officer, War Office.
- Stella Margaret Bishop, Reader Librarian to the Royal Naval Recreational Libraries.
- John Arthur Blake, GM, Chairman, Bermondsey Local Employment Committee.
- William Stanley Bond, Executive Officer, Ministry of Supply.
- Albert Ernest Bonner, Temporary Assistant, Board of Trade.
- Walter Leonard Roston Bourke, Senior Executive Officer, Ministry of National Insurance.
- Thomas Bourne, JP, Chairman, South Cheshire District Committee, Cheshire Agricultural Executive Committee.
- May Braddon, JP. For public services in mid-Cheshire.
- Arthur Edmond Bradley, Food Executive Officer, Belfast District Office, Ministry of Food.
- Gerald Francis Brady, Grade 3 Officer, Ministry of Labour and National Service.
- Harold Guy Brandis, Chief Instructor, Civil Defence Staff College, Sunningdale.
- Isaac Robert Broad, Chairman, Reading & District War Pensions Committee.
- Arthur Brooke, Lately Departmental Manager, Crofts (Engineers) Ltd., Bradford.
- Albert Springall Brown, Works Manager, HM Stationery Office.
- Jessie Vera Lawford Brown, Director, Yateley Textile Printers, Ltd.
- John George Hunter Brown, Lately Manager, Galvanizing Department, Palmers (Hebburn) Co. Ltd., Hebburn-on Tyne.
- Robert Douglas Brown, Inspector of Taxes (Higher Grade), Board of Inland Revenue.
- Arnold Brownlee, For political and public services in County Durham.
- William Arthur Brownlow, Honorary Secretary, Newark and Nottingham Branches, Grenadier Guards Comrades Association.
- Thomas Llewelyn Brumwell, Superintendent and Deputy Chief Constable, Mid-Wales Constabulary.
- Bernard Reeve Bryan, Station Superintendent, British European Airways.
- Jessie May Burnett, Clerical Officer, Headquarters Western Command, War Office.
- George John Bush, Higher Executive Officer, Ministry of Housing & Local Government.
- Philip Chapman Butler, Higher Executive Officer, Eastern Traffic Area, Ministry of Transport.
- Henry Caine, Colliery Manager, North Eastern Division, National Coal Board.
- Albert Henry Cairns, Manager of Clapham (South) Deep Shelter, War Office.
- Harold Mervyn Calam, Chairman, North Eastern Sea Fisheries Committee.
- James Duncan Carey, Captain, Boys Brigade, Whitley Bay & Tynemouth Area.
- George Carmichael, Senior Executive Officer, Ministry of Agriculture & Fisheries.
- Elizabeth Catherine Chalke, JP, County Organiser, Glamorgan, Women's Voluntary Services.
- Frederick James Champ, Senior Executive Officer, War Office.
- Gerald Arthur Champniss, Operations Officer, Grade 2, Ministry of Civil Aviation.
- Phyllis Charley, Voluntary Worker, Royal Ulster Rifles Regimental Association.
- Margaret Chilcott, Deputy Building Licensing Officer, Birmingham Region, Ministry of Works.
- Arthur George Child, Engineer Assistant, Admiralty.
- Edward Arthur Chorley, Higher Executive Officer, HM Treasury.
- Horace Seaton Clark, Executive Officer, Ministry of Health.
- Oliver Clark, Assistant to the United Kingdom Trade Commissioner, Dublin.
- Frederick William Benjamin Clarke, Lately Chief Steward and Purser, MV Port Jackson, Port Line Ltd.
- Leonard Harris Clarke, Borough Engineer and Architect, Harrogate.
- Harry Clay, Managing Director, W. Dickins & Co. Ltd., Walsall.
- Frank Cecil Codrington, Section Manager, Cox & Kings Branch, Lloyds Bank.
- Aileen Harriet Collum, Assistant Honorary Secretary, Chelsea Branch, British Legion.
- Robert Cook, Chief Superintendent and Deputy Chief Constable, City of Dundee Police.
- Albert Bertie Coomer, Secretary, Creed & Company Ltd., Croydon.
- Percy Copley, Deputy Inspector of Naval Ordnance (Civil), Admiralty.
- Charles Corps, District Commercial Superintendent, Middlesbrough, Railway Executive.
- Southwell Coultas, Senior Executive Officer, Supplies Department, General Post Office.
- William Cowell, Headmaster, Waterhouses County Secondary Modern School, County Durham.
- Alderman John Donaldson Craig, JP, DL, Secretary, Twickenham Unit, Sea Cadet Corps.
- Jack Cummin, Managing Director, J. Cummin Ltd., High Wycombe.
- Hugh Hughes Davies, Chairman, Bridgend Savings Committee.
- Emily Elizabeth Dawkins, Outpatients and Casualty Sister, St Bartholomew's Hospital, Rochester.
- Jack Hamilton Day, Transport Officer, Imperial War Graves Commission.
- Percy Ernest Day, Secretary, Bacon Curers' (War-Time) Association Ltd.
- George William Denman. For political and public services in Leeds.
- Edmund Edward Denton, Superintendent Regional Director's Office, London Postal Region, General Post Office.
- Charlotte Ann Deuchar, Chief Clerk, West Telephone Area, General Post Office.
- Frederick George Diver, Chief Engineer, McMichael Radio Ltd., Slough.
- John Alexander Doak, Senior Executive Officer, Ministry of Supply.
- Charles Downie, Executive Officer, Department of Health for Scotland.
- Edwin Peter Driscoll. For services as Leader, British Red Cross Society Relief Team, Korea.
- William Richard Dunderdale, Senior Representative, International Aeradio Ltd., Damascus.
- Charles Edward Dunt, Lately Senior Clerk, Ipswich District, Eastern Electricity Board.
- Joseph William Dyson, Area Slaughterhouse Agent, Ministry of Food.
- Harry Leaton Edwards, Lately Command Analyst, Royal Air Force, Iraq.
- Walter Templeton Edwards, Inspector of Taxes (Higher Grade), Board of Inland Revenue.
- Joseph Arthur Ensor, Senior Executive Officer, Scottish Education Department.
- Edgar Wellesley Entwistle, Senior Executive Officer, Ministry of Works.
- Dorothy Kate Epps. For political and public services in Lewisham.
- Lizzie Ellen Nellie Erskine. For public services in County Antrim.
- William Henry Estall, Managing Director, William Estall & Sons Ltd., Manchester.
- Charles John Radford Evans, Clerk to the Eastry Rural District Council.
- Mary Evans. For political and public services in Doncaster.
- Robert Henry Evans, Chairman, Leominster District Committee, Hereford Agricultural Executive Committee.
- Thomas James Evans. For public services in Merthyr Tydfil.
- Marjorie Annie Farrow, Executive Officer, Lord Chancellor's Department.
- John Faulds. For services to Brass Bands in East Scotland.
- Winifred Marion Fearnside, JP. For political and public services in Cornwall.
- Herbert Halyburton Fell, Mechanical and Electrical Engineer, Directorate of Works, Air Ministry.
- Arthur Fellows, Principal Administrative Assistant, Town Clerk's Department, Manchester.
- Douglas Edward Fleming, Transport Member, Hull Area Grain Committee.
- Albert Flint, Lately Office Manager, Brown Bayley Steels Ltd., Sheffield.
- Kathleel Margarite Foster, Manageress, Blue Kettle Club, Canal Zone, Egypt.
- William Ernest Foster, Despatch and Transport Manager, William Rollins & Co. Ltd., Nottingham.
- Frank Hallaway Fox, Head of Division, Paymaster General's Office.
- John Henry Freeman, JP. Lately Manager, Coryton Oil Installation, Vacuum Oil Co.
- Alderman Frederick Roland Fryer, JP. For political and public services in Hull.
- Ada Mary Gadsby, Member, Sutton-in-Ashfield & District Employment Committee.
- Thomas James Gale, Designer, Pulsometer Engineering Co. Ltd., Reading.
- James Francis Galloway, Sub-Area Engineer, Edinburgh, South East Scotland Electricity Board.
- May Smithells Gambling, Joint County Organiser, East Suffolk, Women's Voluntary Services.
- Ernest Garthwaite, Chief Engineer, Marconi Instruments Ltd., St. Albans.
- Maurice Bertram Gates, Grade 4 Officer, Branch B of the Foreign Service, Foreign Office.
- Eric Bullard Gaul, Senior Executive Officer, Ministry of Pensions.
- Gwendolen Mary Gaymer, Establishment Assistant, European Services, British Broadcasting Corporation.
- Elizabeth Sarah Douglas Gibson. For public and charitable services in County Down.
- Ernest Augustine Gifford, Secretary, Northern Ireland Committee, Civil Service Benevolent Fund.
- Samuel Gihon, Secretary, Belfast Battalion and Northern Ireland District, Boys' Brigade.
- Captain Raymond Edward Gilbert, Administrative Assistant (Records), Anzac Agency, Melbourne, Imperial War Graves Commission.
- Robert Gingles, JP, Principal, Ballyclare Primary School, County Antrim.
- William Oswald Gittins, Higher Executive Officer, West Midland Traffic Area, Ministry-of Transport.
- Vernon Peel Glanville, Branch Manager, Cumberland Area, North Eastern Housing Association.
- George Lawrence Grant, Surveyor, Ministry of Works.
- Leslie Charles Gray, Divisional Secretary and Organiser, Amalgamated Union of Building Trade Workers.
- Sylvia Mary Gray, Vice-Chairman, Witney Rural District Council.
- Mary Elsworth Greaves, Temporary Statistical Assistant, Ministry of Works.
- James William Green, Chief Inspector, Mexborough & Swinton Traction Co.
- Thomas Arden Gregory, Weaving Mill Manager, Tootal Broadhurst Lee Co. Ltd., Bolton.
- Frank Couth Griffiths, Chief Engineer Officer, SS Jersey City, Sir William Reardon Smith & Sons, Ltd.
- Marjorie Isabel Morton Gullan, Co-Founder, and President of the Speech Fellowship.
- James Alexander Guy, Foreign Office.
- Terence Edward Huey Gwyer, General Works Manager, Trico-Folberth Ltd.
- Eleazer Halder, Dock Superintendent, Middlesbrough Dock, Docks and Inland Waterways Executive.
- Arthur John Hall, Collector of Taxes (Higher Grade), Board of Inland Revenue.
- William Stanley Hall, Chief of Laboratory, Cooke, Troughton & Simms Ltd., York.
- Phyllis Mary Allenby Hamilton, Civil Defence Officer, Headquarters, Women's Voluntary Services.
- Thomas Harrell, Senior Executive Officer, Savings Department, General Post Office.
- John William Harrison, Vice-Chairman, Fife County Savings Committee.
- Margaret Louise Harrison, Matron, Forde Park Approved School, Newton Abbot.
- Peter Haslam, JP, Chairman, North Western Federation of Building Trades Operatives.
- Alfred Eli Hawker, Assistant District Auditor, Ministry of Housing & Local Government.
- Emily Hearfield, Headmistress, Potter-Newton Mansion School for Physically Handicapped Children, Leeds.
- Maude Heath. For political and public services in Hull.
- John Hebblethwaite, Sub-Area Agent, West Midlands Division, National Coal Board.
- Bertram Joseph Hefford, Chief Superintendent, Metropolitan Police Force.
- Alfred Henry Hebbert, Senior Executive Officer, Air Ministry.
- Margaret Mildred Higgins, JP. For political and public services in South Wales.
- John Hobbs, Skipper of the Steam Trawler Boston Fury.
- Edward Pembroke Hodgson, Commandant, Metropolitan Special Constabulary.
- Harold William Hogben, Head of Armament Section, John I. Thornycroft & Company Ltd., Southampton.
- Herbert Holt, Chairman, Oldham & District Employment Committee.
- Captain Andrew Hood, Master, SS Culross, Chr. Salvesen & Co.
- William Thomas Hough, Higher Executive Officer, Board of Trade.
- Herbert How. For services to the Institution of Chartered Surveyors.
- Frederick George Carrington Howard, Assistant (General) to the Chief Regional Officer, London, Midland Region, Railway Executive.
- Ellen Howe. For political and public services in the Potteries.
- Cicely Elizabeth Hughes. For services to the injured after the railway accident near Weedon, Northamptonshire, 21 September 1951.
- Margaret Hughes, JP. For political and public services in Wales.
- Reginald Fredrick Humphrey, Area Engineer, Portsmouth, Southdown Motor Services.
- David McAlpin Hunter, Assistant Shipyard Manager, Harland & Wolff Ltd., Belfast.
- William Robert Hussey, Deputy Commander, Royal Engineers (Civilian), North Malaya.
- Matilda Ellen Jack. For political and public services in Inverness-shire.
- William Clark Jackson, Coal Officer, Wales Gas Board.
- Kathleen Norah Jobbins, County Organiser, North Middlesex, Women's Voluntary Services.
- Alfred Eales-Johnson, Higher Executive Officer, Ministry of Supply.
- Doris Gwendoline Jollie, Senior Assistant Collector of Taxes, Board of Inland Revenue.
- David Malcolm Jones, Manager, Caernarvon Employment Exchange, Ministry of Labour & National Service.
- Elma Dorothy May Jones, Production Director, J. Arthur Dixon Ltd., Isle of Wight.
- Frederick William Jones, Engineer-in Charge of Machine Shop, Mullard Radio Valve Co., Mitcham, Surrey.
- Mabel Elizabeth Jones, Lately Sister, City Isolation Hospital, Cardiff.
- Richard Arthur Jones, Staff Officer, Board of Inland Revenue.
- Walter George Jones, Camp Manager, National Camps Corporation.
- Walter Reginald Jones, Superintendent and Deputy Chief Constable, Birkenhead Borough Police Force.
- Allan Carlton Kain, Engineer, Metropolitan Division, Ministry of Transport.
- Sydney Kay, Director and Chief Engineer, Cooper Roller Bearings Co. Ltd., King's Lynn.
- Helen Theresa Keenan, Headmistress, St. Thomas's Roman Catholic Primary School, Glasgow.
- George Herbert Kelly, Higher Executive Officer, Board of Trade.
- Wilfrid Kershaw, JP, Senior Executive Officer, Ministry of National Insurance.
- Craig Kilgour, District Superintendent, Mercantile Marine Office Service, Scotland and Northern Ireland.
- Robert Elliott Kingsley. For services to the welfare of sick children and the blind of Glasgow.
- Alderman Ernald de Mosley Kippax, Chairman, Wells, Somerset Savings Committee.
- Leah Lean Kitchingham, Officiating Director, Far East Department, British Council.
- Leslie Knopp, Technical Adviser to the Cinematograph Exhibitors Association.
- Clifford James Lane, Senior Executive Officer, Inland Telecommunications Department, General Post Office.
- Alexander Laurie, Assistant Chief Draughtsman, Brown Bros. & Co. Ltd., Edinburgh.
- Margaret Lee, Matron, County Hospital, Durham.
- Alexander Leitch, Inspector of Taxes, Board of Inland Revenue.
- John Lewis. For political and public services in Anglesey.
- James Lilley, Principal, Ulster Schools for the Deaf and Dumb and the Blind, Belfast.
- Agnes Rodgers McAuslane, Senior Executive Officer, Edinburgh District Food Office, Ministry of Food.
- Robert Hutchinson MacCandless, Actor and Director of the Ulster Group Theatre.
- William Alexander McConnach, Detective Superintendent and Deputy Chief Constable, Plymouth City Police Force.
- Duncan MacFarlane, Manager, Jig & Tool Design Section, Mirrlees Watson Co. Ltd., Glasgow.
- James Balfour McGown. District Commandant, Ulster Special Constabulary.
- Robert McGown, Chairman, Clyde Fishermen's Association.
- John McHardy, Youth and Welfare Worker, Dundee.
- Gertrude Macklin, Director and Production Manager, Berker Sportcraft Ltd., Plymouth.
- Duncan Mclaren, Member, Dumbarton Local Employment Committee.
- Christina McLeod, Grade 4 Officer, Ministry of Labour & National Service.
- Kate McMahon, Health Visitor, Stockport County Borough.
- James McMurtry, Staff Officer, Ministry of Education, Northern Ireland.
- Fanny MacPherson, Women's Voluntary Services District Staff, Western Area of Scotland.
- Mary Ada, McQuire, Superintendent, St. Hilda's Home, York.
- Mirna Gray MacVicar, Welfare Officer, British Red Cross Society.
- Winefride Ethell Mallon, Secretary, Royal College of Obstetricians and Gynaecologists.
- Grace Martha Markwell, JP, Chairman, Women's Sub-Committee of Newport (Mon.) Local Employment Committee.
- William Leonard Marshall, Higher Executive Officer, Board of Inland Revenue.
- Edith Joan Marston, Higher Executive Officer, Ministry of Agriculture & Fisheries.
- Joseph Reginald Maton, Senior Executive Officer, Ministry of Education.
- Alexander William Innes Mayor, Secretary, Scottish Omnibuses Ltd., Edinburgh.
- Florence Kate Melville, Clerical Officer, Ministry of Transport.
- John Clark Metcalfe, Senior Ship Draughtsman, Cook, Welton & Gemmell Ltd., Beverley.
- Edith Jennie Mickleburgh, Chief Superintendent of Typists, Newcastle Central Office, Ministry of National Insurance.
- Sam Field Middup. For political and public services in the East Midlands.
- Beatrice Susannah Mary Miles, Honorary Organiser of Street Savings Groups in Barnsley.
- Louisa Maud Mills, Sister-in-Charge of the Children's Wards, Ulster Hospital for Children and Women, Belfast.
- Ronald Charles Mills, Higher Executive Officer, Public Works Loan Board.
- Edwin Halliburton Milne, Higher Executive Officer, Ministry of Civil Aviation.
- Kathleen Marjorie Milner, JP. For political and public services in Luton.
- Alan Moody, Engineer and Surveyor, Milford Haven Urban District Council.
- Laurence Moore, Chairman, Leeds & District Retail Coal Prices Advisory Committee.
- Leslie Albert Morgan, Assistant to District Operating Superintendent, Cardiff, Railway Executive.
- Richard William Mumford, Assistant Regional Officer, Wales, Ministry of Supply.
- John Robb Munro, Skipper of the Motor Research Vessel Keelby, Department of Scientific & Industrial Research.
- Frank Laurence Murrell, Deputy Chief Officer, Kent Fire Brigade.
- George Myles, Honorary Secretary, County of Angus, Royal Scottish Agricultural Benevolent Institution.
- Cecil Ernest Nash, Chief Draughtsman, Radar Research & Development Establishment, Ministry of Supply, Malvern.
- Albert James Pittock Newing, Valuation Clerk (Higher Grade), Board of Inland Revenue.
- Ethel Winifred Noakes, Higher Executive Officer, Ministry of Fuel & Power.
- William James O'Brien, Senior Sales Superintendent, Telephone Manager's Office, Leeds.
- Bernard Osborn, Chief Visiting Inspector, Contracts Department, Admiralty.
- William Alfred Laughton Osborn, Chairman, St. Pancras Savings Committee.
- Captain Willie James Oxley, Honorary Secretary, Walton and Frinton Lifeboat Station.
- Captain Frederick Daniel Parker, Master, Tug Turmoil, Overseas Towage & Salvage Co. Ltd.
- Thomas Charles Parker, Production Manager, Vickers-Armstrongs Ltd., Weybridge.
- David Bernard Parkinson, Honorary Secretary, No. 1172 (Esher) Squadron, Air Training Corps.
- Frank Henry Parsons. For political services.
- Thomas William Payton, Adviser on Timber Supplies & Timber Packaging, Ministry of Food.
- Thomas Reid Pett, Civilian Technical Superintendent, No.5 Maintenance Unit, Royal Air Force, Kemble.
- Alexina Richmond Pettigrew, Health Visitor, Glasgow.
- Arthur Tysoe Phillips, Chief Draughtsman, North Thames Gas Board.
- Robert Edward Plummer Lately Senior Executive Officer, Ministry of National Insurance.
- Edith Muriel Powell, Founder & Superintendent, Searchlight Cripples' Workshops, Newhaven, Sussex.
- John Alfred Press, Manager, Bakelite Ltd., Aycliffe.
- Percival Henry James Price, Group Production Engineer, Morecambe Area, Lancaster Group, North Western Gas Board.
- Bert Proctor, Charge Nurse, Bridge Home, Witham, Essex.
- Elizabeth Glanathan Ramsay, Matron, Crookston Homes for Old People, Glasgow.
- Alfred Andrew Richards, Nursery Manager, Agricultural Experimental Research Station, Cheshunt.
- Doris Richardson, Headmistress, Tipton St. John Voluntary Primary School, Devon.
- William Robertson, Column Officer, South-Eastern Area Fire Brigade, Scotland.
- William Henderson Robertson, Steward, Class I, Barlinnie Prison, Glasgow.
- Robert Carr Rodgers. For political and public services in Manchester.
- Agnes Kate Rolph. For political and public services in Hertfordshire.
- Hilda Douglas Ross, Nurse, Soldiers', Sailors', and Airmen's Families' Association, Canal Zone, Egypt.
- Cecil Thomas Royle, MC, Lately Secretary, East Malling Research Station.
- John Russell, Chairman, Midlothian Savings Committee.
- John Hopwood Sayer. For political and public services in Lancashire.
- George Arthur Scaife, Lately Master of the York Minster Song School.
- Clara Scott, Lately Member, Keighley Local Employment Committee.
- Eliza Agnes Scott, Executive Officer, Air Ministry.
- Sidney Maurice Sewell, Docks Manager, King's Lynn Docks & Inland Waterways Executive.
- Ernest William Shakespeare, Chairman, Shipley Local Employment Committee.
- Edwin James Sharp, Chief Clerk, Office of the High Commissioner for the United Kingdom in South Africa.
- Edith Shatford, Headmistress, Musters Road County Infants' School, West Bridgford, Nottingham.
- Vera Louvain Sheppard, Executive Officer, Ministry of Defence.
- Edward Simper, General Works Manager, Linotype & Machinery, Ltd., Altrincham.
- Leslie Carl Skinner, Senior Experimental Officer, Civil Aircraft Research & Development Branch, Ministry of Supply.
- Hugh Fraser Smart, District Operating Superintendent, Burntisland Railway Executive.
- Felix Albert George Smith, Executive Officer, Science Museum.
- Frederick Charles Smith, Joint Secretary, Watson House Centre, North Thames Gas Board.
- Neil Adam Smith, Deputy Chief Inspector of Ships' Provisions, Ministry of Transport.
- Reginald James Sparks, Honorary Secretary, Duke of Cornwall's Light Infantry, Old Comrades' Association, London Branch.
- George Henry Stanwix, Assistant Director of Rice, Ministry of Food.
- James Graham Paterson Stevenson, JP, Clerk, Executive Council, National Health Service for the City of Edinburgh.
- David Grieve Stewart, Higher Executive Officer, Ministry of Food.
- George Stockdale, Headmaster, West Leigh High School, Leigh-on-Sea.
- James Stockwell, Works Director, Switchgear & Cowans Ltd., Manchester.
- James Richard Stokes. For political services.
- Richard Noel Stone, Chief Press Photographer, Central Office of Information.
- Francis Charles Strangeman, Higher Executive Officer, Air Ministry.
- Annie Marie Strutt Hall, Lately Senior Executive Officer, Ministry of National Insurance.
- Ernest Thomas Tacagni, Grade 4 Officer, Ministry of Labour & National Service.
- Arthur Bertram Tanner, Higher Executive Officer, Office of HM Procurator General & Treasury Solicitor.
- Alderman Ezra Taylor, JP. For services as Chairman, Castleford Urban District Council.
- Gordon Frederick Taylor, Engineer Grade 2 (Supplementary), Ministry of Supply.
- Herbert Fred Taylor, Chief Executive Officer, Ministry of Supply.
- James Taylor, Grade 3 Officer, Ministry of Labour & National Service.
- John Dean Taylor, Principal Probation Officer, City of Aberdeen.
- Winifred Tegg, Matron, Welfare Department, London County Council.
- Cyril Percy Terry, Senior Executive Officer, Board of Trade.
- Albert Edward Thoday, Branch Secretary, National Union of Agricultural Workers.
- Daniel Hanner Thompson. For services as District Manager, Malaya, Navy, Army & Air Force Institutes.
- Elizabeth Kerr Thomson, President, Ladies' Committee of Prestonpans, East Lothian.
- Thomas Balvaird Thomson, Sales Manager, Associated Clay Industries Ltd., Paisley.
- Captain Reginald Trelawny Thornton, MC, Warden, National Association of Boys' Clubs Training Centre.
- Reginald James Tickner, Deputy Chief Officer, Southampton Fire Brigade.
- Eleanor Mary Tinkler, Grade 4 Officer, Branch B of the Foreign Service, Foreign Office.
- Joseph Horace Toft, Registrar, Nottingham North Sub-District Census Office, 1951.
- Freeman Paul Tofton, Engineer Manager and Director, J. S. Doig (Grimsby) Ltd.
- Edward Townsley, Staff Officer, Ministry of Labour & National Insurance, Northern Ireland.
- Fred Tremayne, Senior Auditor, Exchequer & Audit Department.
- Muriel Mary Trippe, Grade 3 Milk Production Advisory Officer, Ministry of Agriculture & Fisheries.
- Alan Neobel Trowbridge, Sanitary Inspector & Surveyor, Market Bosworth Rural District Council.
- Harry Truman, Senior Assessor, Central Land Board & War Damage Commission.
- Beatrice Maud Turner, Honorary Secretary, West Hartlepool Savings Committee.
- George Henry Mann Turner, JP, Chairman, Worksop & District Local Employment Committee.
- Leonard Turner. Lately Deputy Principal, Coventry Technical College.
- Francis John Urry, Vice-President, Finance Committee, Cyclists' Touring Club.
- Herbert Leslie Vass, Honorary Treasurer, Bolsover Savings Committee, Derbyshire.
- Leonard Edmund Vergine, Senior Office Assistant in the Parliament Office, House of Lords.
- Frederick George Vincent, Higher Executive Officer, War Office.
- Aubrey Rockett Wakeham, Technical Officer, Petroleum Division, Ministry of Fuel & Power.
- Kythe Gertrude Waldram, JP, County Borough Organiser, Grimsby, Women's Voluntary Services.
- Walter Walkden, Headmaster, Severrie Road County Primary School, Birmingham.
- William Henry Wallis. For political and public services in Edinburgh.
- Frances Maud Wanklyn, Honorary Secretary, Mercantile Marine Masters & Officers Relief Fund.
- Charles Fredrick Ward, Architect, Welsh Office, Ministry of Housing & Local Government.
- Ethel Mary Waterhouse, Member, Lexden & Winstree Rural District Savings Committee, Essex.
- Algernon Hewlett Watson, Commercial Officer, Portsmouth Sub-Area, Southern Electricity Board.
- Charles Arthur Watson, Lately Manager, Scunthorpe Employment Exchange, Ministry of Labour & National Service.
- Samuel James Watson, JP, Chairman, Moira Rural District Council, County Down.
- Thomas Shields Watson, Assistant Engineer Manager, Harland & Wolff Ltd., Belfast.
- John Wedge, Electrical Engineer, Admiralty.
- Wilfred Benjamin Whitaker, Surveyor, Manchester Purchase Tax District, Board of Customs & Excise.
- Winifred White, Foreign Office.
- James Albert Whittaker, Member of Executive Council, Amalgamated Society of Woodcutting Machinists.
- Agnes Marjorie Whyte. For services to Music in Bromley, Kent.
- Albert Wigginton, Higher Executive Officer, Ministry of National Insurance.
- Burtwell Wigmore, Warden, Dockland Settlement, Bristol.
- Grace Wilkie, Postmistress, Alyth, Perthshire.
- Jeremiah Williams, Chairman, Caernarvonshire County Garden Produce Committee.
- Joseph Williams, Lately Hospital Secretary, Ministry of Pensions.
- William Wilfred Vaughan Williams, Traffic Assistant, Bristol Tramways & Carriage Co. Ltd.
- Beatrice Wilson, JP. For political and public services in London.
- Henry George Witt, Principal Clerk, Official Solicitor's Department, Supreme Court of Judicature.
- John Wood, Executive Engineer, Research Station, General Post Office.
- Doris Louise Wooderson, Superintendent of Typists, Office of Parliamentary Counsel.
- Samuel Thomas Holton Woodham, MM, Higher Executive Officer, Board of Trade.
- Ernest Joseph Woodward, Senior Executive Officer, Ministry of Agriculture & Fisheries.
- Frederick Albert Wyett. For political and public services in London.
- John Yarwood, District Secretary, Northern District, National Union of General & Municipal Workers.
- Alfred Leonard Back, Accountant at Her Majesty's Legation in Budapest.
- Jack Sherman Bailey, Control Officer II, Wilhelmshaven, Control Commission for Germany (British Element).
- Robert Bradburn, Inspector, Arms, Stores and Ordnance Department, Sudan Government.
- Victor Frederick Brand, Maintenance Engineer at Her Majesty's Embassy in Peking.
- Lionel Martin Brans, Senior Assistant Superintendent of Police, Grade III, Eritrean Police Force.
- John Joseph Brooks, Inspector Headquarters, Ministry of Education, Sudan Government.
- Robert John Camilleri, British Pro-Consul at Suez.
- Edith Constance Church, Shorthand Typist at Her Majesty's Embassy in Djakarta.
- Grenville Leonard Cock, Chief Inspector, Metropolitan Police. For services to the British Police Mission to Greece.
- Owen Peel Calmady Collier, Grade II Official acting as General Manager of the Eritrean Railways.
- Colin Laurence Elloy, Movements Officer, Office of the Commissioner-General for Her Majesty's Government in the United Kingdom in South-East Asia.
- James Bernard Flanagan, District Inspector, Royal Ulster Constabulary. For services to the British Police Mission to Greece.
- George William Hamilton Gibbs, Press Officer at Her Majesty's Embassy in Buenos Aires.
- Violet Cecilia Harrison Gray, Clerical Officer, Office of the Commissioner-General for Her Majesty's Government in the United Kingdom in South-East Asia.
- Hugh Carroll Holberton, British subject resident in Spain.
- William Charles Ikeson, Technical Assistant to the Chief Mechanical Engineer, Iraqi State Railways.
- William Reginald Keight, Director, British Council Centre, Basra.
- Francis Kenny, Senior Executive Officer, Office of the Labour Adviser, Control Commission for Germany (British Element).
- Benedict Emmanuel Lambert, Consular Clerk at Her Majesty's Legation at Saigon.
- William Henry Linaker, Superintendent, Lancashire County Constabulary. For services to the British Police Mission to Greece.
- Alexander John MacDonald, British subject resident in Hayti.
- Robert Kimberlin McQueen, Senior Temporary Assistant, Information Services Division, Control Commission for Germany (British Element).
- James Morrison, Fleetmaster, Sudan.
- Zelma Alice Gladys Peake, British subject resident in Chile.
- George Felix Randegger, Medical Adviser to Her Majesty's Embassy and the British Community in Rome.
- Blanche Slade, School Teacher, Port Sudan Parochial School.
- Joseph Tye Tomlinson, Warden, Sailors, Soldiers & Airmen's Home, Port Said.
- Harold Twitchin, General Secretary, British Chamber of Commerce, France.
- Cyril Francis Palmer Anderson, Chief Poultry Adviser and Chairman of the Egg Board, State of South Australia.
- Cecil John Baldwin, General Secretary of the Overseas League in Scotland.
- Katharine Margaret Kendal Bigg, Senior Lady Clerk, Basutoland.
- Walter William Victor Briggs, Headmaster of Scotch College, Launceston, State of Tasmania.
- Major Kenelm Austin Byrne, British South Africa Police Reserve.
- Ernest Edwin Cock. For public services in the State of Victoria.
- The Reverend Frederick Arthur Fitch, a missionary in the Que Que District, Southern Rhodesia.
- Senior Commander Marjorie Elaine Foster, late ATS, a member of the Committee of the British Commonwealth Rifle Club. For services to visitors from overseas.
- Olive May Green, State Supervisor of Child Welfare, State of Tasmania.
- Elizabeth Chapman Griggs, JP. For social welfare services in the Geeveston district, State of Tasmania.
- William Samuel Clifford Ham, JP, Councillor of the Shire of Rochester, State of Victoria, since 1916.
- Leslie Victor Hoyle, Clerk of the Papers, Legislative Council State of Victoria.
- Mervyn Alexander Jacobson. For services on behalf of returned soldiers in the Glenorchy district, State of Tasmania.
- Graham Wingrove Kidd, Compound Manager, Wankie Colliery, Southern Rhodesia.
- Alice Elizabeth Lamshed. For services rendered under the auspices of the Women's Auxiliary, Parkside Mental Hospital, State of South Australia.
- Benor Samuel Leon. For public and social welfare services in Southern Rhodesia.
- Joel Thabiso Mohapeloa, Treasurer, Basuto National Treasury, Basutoland.
- Marjorie Mellis McDonald, Principal Commandant of the Women Personnel of the Red Cross Society, State of Victoria.
- Stanton James Overend, Treasurer of the Gippsland Hospital, State of Victoria.
- Arthur Pendered, Marketing Officer, Native Affairs Department, Southern Rhodesia.
- Gideon Elliot Pott, Agent in Johannesburg for Basutoland, the Bechuanaland Protectorate and Swaziland.
- Isaac Tetter Agbettor, Senior Collector of Customs & Excise, Gold Coast.
- Salamat Ali. For public services in Trinidad.
- Anne Marie Andre. For welfare and social services in Mauritius.
- Reginald Baker, Higher Executive Officer, Engineering Stores Department, Office of the Crown Agents for the Colonies.
- Marion Cowperthwaite Ballysingh, JP. For social and welfare work in Jamaica.
- Durga Dass Bawa. For public services in Uganda.
- Arthur Leslie Baxby, Assistant Locomotive Superintendent, Malayan Railway.
- Violet Irene Edith Lorna Bell. For services to women's education in Somaliland.
- William Boddy. For public services in Kenya.
- David Brocket. For public services in Nigeria.
- Major John Ellis Browne, Colonial Postal Service, Senior Engineer, Posts and Telegraphs Department, Gold Coast.
- Samuel Alfred Ishola Bucknor, Senior Surveyor, Survey Department, Nigeria.
- Nicholas Chua Kim Duan, Senior Permanent Way Inspector, North Borneo Railways.
- Augusta Maura Brown Corbin. For social and welfare work in Bermuda.
- Richard Byrne Corridon, JP, Assistant Superintendent of Police, Singapore.
- Christopher Powell-Cotton, MC, Colonial Administrative Service, Assistant District Officer, Uganda.
- John Alexander Danford, Regional Director, British Council, Western Provinces, Nigeria.
- Caroline Martha Drakely. For services to women's education in Uganda.
- Chief Elijah arap Chepkwony, Kaptumo Location, Kenya.
- Roderick Finlayson. For services to farming in the Falkland Islands.
- William Fogwill, Senior Health Inspector, Hong Kong.
- Charles Elliot Fox. For missionary service in the British Solomon Islands Protectorate.
- Emile Galistan, JP. For public services in Singapore.
- Joan Gillan. For social and welfare work in Aden.
- Marjorie Wynn Gowing, Chief Cypher Clerk, King's House, Kuala Lumpur, Federation of Malaya.
- The Reverend Sidney Douglas Gray. For missionary services in Northern Rhodesia.
- Arthur Ritchie Hendriks, JP. For public services in Jamaica.
- Ada Naylor Hess. For services to the British Red Cross Society in Nyasaland.
- William Richard Hillyer. Senior Marine Officer, Hong Kong.
- Captain John Frederick George Holmes, Out Island Development Engineer, Out Island Department, Bahamas.
- Roland Horace Howard, Lately Senior Agricultural Supervisor, Northern Rhodesia.
- Wilhelmina Kelly, Nursing Sister, Tanganyika.
- Mehmed Kemal Bey. For public services in Cyprus.
- Caroline Baxter Kibble, MRCS, LRCP, Lately temporary Lady Medical Officer, The Malay Regiment, Federation of Malaya.
- Mohammed Hassan King, Accountant, Public Works Department, Sierra Leone.
- Michael Hayfrom La, Temporary Agricultural Survey Officer, Gold Coast.
- James Kenneth Luck, Auditor, British Guiana.
- Joyce Rewcastle Ludlow, MB, FRCS. For medical and social welfare work in Nigeria.
- Elsie Lyne, JP. For services to education and welfare in Singapore.
- Joseph Theodore Roy Macaulay, Assistant Social Welfare Officer, Sierra Leone.
- Elspeth Hendry Mackillican. For services to women's education in the Gold Coast.
- Claud Mann, Divisional Officer, Special Reserve Police, Trinidad.
- Adam McLintoch Miller, Manager, Uvinza Salt Mine, Tanganyika.
- Hortense Morel For public services in Seychelles.
- Stanley Howe Morris, Inspecting Engineer, Office of the Crown Agents for the Colonies.
- Vayloo Pakirisamy, JP. For public services in Singapore.
- Howard Reynold Penn. For public services in the Leeward Islands.
- Alfred Hadewood Price, European Process Server, Her Majesty's Court, Kenya.
- Peter Elia Prince, Auditor, Cyprus.
- Brahmanand Raghvanand, Assistant to the Commissioner for Native Reserves, Fiji.
- Sinnathamby Rajaratnam, Deputy Registrar of Titles, Selangor, Federation of Malaya.
- Hugh Owen Ramsey, Office Superintendent, Department of Science and Agriculture, Barbados.
- Michel Jean Joseph Laval Rivalland, Controller of Supplies, Mauritius.
- Major John Murray Rosewarne. For public services in Bermuda.
- Dwarka Singh, Assistant, Class I, Government Printing Office, Fiji.
- Kathie Adams Smith, Assistant Public Relations Officer, Nyasaland.
- Joseph John Suarez, Sanitary Inspector, City Council of Gibraltar.
- Tan Soo Ghi, JP. For public services in Malacca, Federation of Malaya.
- Patricia Ellen Taylor, Deputy Town Clerk, Ndola Municipal Council, Northern Rhodesia.
- Frederick George Templeman, Station Engineer, East African Airways, Dar-es Salaam, East Africa High Commission.
- Anant Vyankatesh Thakur, Office Assistant, Lands and Mines Department, Tanganyika.
- Sister Faith Eva Ward, Sister in Charge, Church Missionary Society Leper Settlement, Makutupora, Manyoni District, Tanganyika.
- Albert William Watkins, Chief Engineer, East African Airways, East Africa High Commission.
- Hugh Reginald Watts, JP. For public services in the Federation of Malaya.
- Patricia Webber. For public services in the Federation of Malaya.
- Robert Michael Woolfenden, Colonial Engineering Service, Assistant Engineer, Public Works Department, Federation of Malaya.

Honorary Members

- Sheikh Ahmed bin Umar Ba Surra, Naib of Shihr Province in Qu'aiti State, Aden.
- Rais Abdullah Suleiman Al Jordani, Beduin Affairs Assistant, Aden.
- Pengiran Abu Bakar bin Pengiran Omar, District Officer, Brunei and Muara, Brunei.
- Cyprian Dominic Ambrose Skelchy, Chief Storekeeper, Special Grade, Federation of Malaya.
- Weerantunge Edward Perera, Teacher, Anglo-Chinese School, Telok Anson, Federation of Malaya.
- Inche Abdul Majid bin Haji Mohamed, Assistant Registrar of Co-operative Societies, Federation of Malaya.
- Inche Mohammed Syed bin Mohammed Yassin, Chief School Teacher, Police Depot, Federation of Malaya.
- Ayodele Lijadu, Press Officer, Public Relations Department, Nigeria.
- Atim Ekanem Duke. For nursing services in Nigeria.
- Emmanuel Jemisala Ajayi, JP. For public services in Nigeria.
- Nya Essien Inyang, Acting Principal and School Manager of Edgerly Girls' School, Calabar, Nigeria.
- James Henry Mwela, Assistant Warden, St. Mark's College, Mapanza (UMCA), Northern Rhodesia.
- Alhaji Bai Lama, Paramount Chief, Sanda Tenraren Chiefdom, Sierra Leone.
- Jirdeh Hussein. For public services in Somaliland.

=== Order of the Companions of Honour (CH) ===
- The Right Honourable Walter Elliot Elliot, MC, DL, MP, Member of Parliament for Lanark, 1918–1923; for Kelvingrove Division, 1924–1945; for Scottish Universities, 1946–1950; and for Kelvingrove Division since 1950; Minister of Health, 1938–1940; Secretary of State for Scotland, 1936–1938; Minister of Agriculture and Fisheries, 1932–1936; Financial Secretary to the Treasury, 1931–1932. For political and public services.

=== Companions of the Imperial Service Order ===
Home Civil Service

- Charles Beattie Anderson, Deputy Controller, Clydeside (Glasgow) Sub-Region, National Assistance Board (Kilmacholm).
- William Arthur Carson, MBE, Registrar-General for Northern Ireland (Belfast).
- William Watson Clark, MBE, MC, Principal, Colonial Office (Wembley).
- William Gilbert Craig, Deputy Director, Statistics and Shipping Intelligence Division, Ministry of Transport (Staines).
- William Henry Cousins Davey, inspector, Children's Department, Home Office (West Baling, W13).
- Albert John Dean, Chief Executive Officer, Ministry of Education (Kenton).
- Herbert Dunster, Assistant Secretary, Ministry of Supply (Hampstead, NW3).
- Frederick Arthur Hainsworth, Deputy Accountant General, Ministry of Food (Banstead).
- William Thomson Harrower, MBE, Chief Executive Officer, Foreign Office (Northwood).
- Herbert Hewstone, Chief Accountant, Ministry of Fuel & Power (Epsom).
- Edwin Horn, Principal, Ministry of Health (Bromley).
- Francis Raymond Ivens, Chief Executive Officer, Ministry of Civil Aviation (Wallington).
- Violet Christine Lawe, Principal, Ministry of Agriculture and Fisheries (Kensington, W8).
- Ethel Alice Leighton, MBE, Chief Executive Officer, Department of Scientific and Industrial Research (St Albans).
- Elizabeth Ann Marshall, Grade 2 Officer, Ministry of Labour and National Service (Chiswick, W4).
- Jack Masters, Chief Executive Officer, Ministry of Pensions (St Annes-on-Sea).
- Charles Walter Alexander Millar, Chief Executive Officer, Air Ministry (Reading).
- William Ford Mitchell, lately Deputy Director of Stores, Admiralty (Walton-on Thames).
- Albert Newsome, Controller, Factories Department, General Post Office (Hampstead, NW3).
- George Page, Principal, Department of Agriculture for Scotland (Edinburgh).
- Ralph Spencer, Higher Collector, Bristol, Board of Customs & Excise (Bristol).
- Arthur Moxon Tristram, Principal, Board of Inland Revenue (Woking).
- James Arthur Watson, Principal Examiner, Board of Trade (Radlett).
- Arthur Sharpin White, Librarian, War Office (Wallington).
- John Edwin Winter, Assistant Secretary, Ministry of Works (South Godstone).

Australian states and Bechuanaland Protectorate

- Percival Francis Cherry, Secretary to the Railways Commissioner, State of South Australia.
- Oliphant Bell Miller, Forest Officer, Bechuanaland Protectorate.
- Hubert Arthur Mullett, Director and Permanent Head of the Department of Agriculture, State of Victoria.
- Ralph Gordon Terry, Manager, Supply and Tender Department, State of Tasmania.

Colonial Service

- Egerton Seaton Hendriks, Commissioner of Income Tax & Stamp Duties, Jamaica.
- Captain Harry Vincent Mercer Metivier, OBE, lately Deputy Director of Agriculture (Animal Husbandry), Trinidad.
- William George Peasley, MBE, Colonial Customs Service, Comptroller of Customs, Mauritius.

=== British Empire Medal (BEM) ===
Military Division

Royal Navy

- Stores Chief Petty Officer (S) John Renfree Andrews, D/MX 766632.
- Chief Petty Officer Writer Frederick Edward Bailey, C/MX 49709.
- Telegraphist Hugh Henry Albert Campbell, D/JX 581568.
- Petty Officer Chan Tai Sing, H.K O.82.
- Chief Engine Room Artificer Charles Brown Fittes, P/MX 55919.
- Quartermaster Sergeant Herbert William Foster, Ply.X 762, Royal Marines.
- Chief Petty Officer Anthony James Barff Freeman, P/J 40965.
- Chief Petty Officer Steward Alfredo Gauci, E/LX 21146.
- Chief Engine Room Artificer Edward Charles Gosden, P/MX 50597.
- Chief Shipwright John Joseph Anthony Grech, M/MX 49967.
- Chief Petty Officer Stanley George Frank Hall, C/JX 129859.
- Chief Petty Officer Cook (S) Claude William Hewison, P/M 36320.
- Chief Petty Officer Telegraphist Ronald Leslie Howick, P/JX 153603.
- Sick Berth Chief Petty Officer Thomas Jones, C/MX 48756.
- Chief Petty Officer Writer Harry William Knapp, C/MX 52086.
- Chief Wren (Clothing) Agnes Mc Nabb, 23461, Women's Royal Naval Service.
- Petty Officer Telegraphist James Moore, D/J 114504.
- Chief Electrician Frank Charles Moss, P/MX 769244.
- Chief Petty Officer Stoker Mechanic Simon Henry Moyle, D/KX 90992.
- Chief Petty Officer Frank Henry Oliver, DSM, P/J 112409.
- Chief Officer Wren (Clothing) Stella Margery Piper, 20579, Women's Royal Naval Service.
- Chief Engine Room Artificer Seymour Tillett Purnell, D/MX 50171.
- Master-at-Arms Adrian bin Raji, Malayan Royal Naval Volunteer Reserve.
- Stores Chief Petty Officer (S) Leslie Gordon Riall, P/MX 53452.
- Stores Chief Petty Officer (V) Harold Edwin Shephard, D/MX 47925.
- Chief Yeoman of Signals Leonard Smith, C/JX 132697.
- Chief Mechanician Frederick Isaac Tatam, C/KX 89345.
- Colour Sergeant Henry Gerard Taylor, Po.X 939, Royal Marines.
- Chief Petty Officer Stoker Mechanic Horace George Tripp, D/KX 83516.
- Chief Petty Officer Writer George James Turner, SD/15, RNVR.
- Chief Petty Officer Cook (S) Harry Victor Wallace, D/MX 56962.

Army

- No. 1876493 Staff-Sergeant (acting) Robert Astles, Corps of Royal Engineers.
- No. 2080932 Staff-Sergeant Tom Venners Barlow, Royal Regiment of Artillery, Territorial Army.
- No. 22367827 Corporal (acting) Raymond Alfred Bayliss, Corps of Royal Electrical & Mechanical Engineers.
- No. 22265321 Sergeant (acting) Denis Martin Berezai, Royal Corps of Signals.
- No. 22231646 Staff-Sergeant (acting) Edgar Bernardi, Intelligence Corps.
- No. 22329573 Sergeant (acting) John Edward Bickerdke, Royal Army Ordnance Corps.
- No. 1866699 Staff-Sergeant Lawrence Noel Birchall, Corps of Royal Engineers.
- No. 1873878 Sergeant (acting) Norman William Bradbury, Corps of Royal Engineers.
- No. 809396 Sergeant John George Bradley, Royal Regiment of Artillery.
- No. 22522006 Corporal (acting) Donald William Butt, Royal Army Ordnance Corps.
- No. 27697 Sergeant George Davies, Royal Regiment of Artillery, Territorial Army.
- No. 21015357 Colour-Sergeant Neil Alexander Iveson Day, Special Air Service Regiment, Territorial Army.
- No. 185769 Sergeant (Artillery Clerk) John Dean, Royal Regiment of Artillery, Territorial Army.
- No. 5570267 Sergeant (acting) Edward Percy Dixon, Royal Army Ordnance Corps.
- No. 16000596 Warrant Officer Class II (acting) (Armament Artificer) Wilfred James Eaton, Corps of Royal Electrical & Mechanical Engineers.
- No. Jca/18001074 Sergeant Fitzgerald Edwards, Works Platoon, Jamaica Battalion.
- No. 841381 Battery-Quartermaster-Sergeant Henry Lens Ellis, Royal Regiment of Artillery, Territorial Army.
- No. Maur/18027807 Staff-Sergeant (acting) Saban Fakeersaib, Royal Pioneer Corps.
- No. 3044245 Sergeant (Pipe Major) George Sinclair Forsyth, The Royal Scots (The Royal Regiment), Territorial Army.
- No. S/14451797 Staff-Sergeant Dennis George, Royal Army Service Corps.
- No. S/22280079 Warrant Officer Class II (acting) William Frederick George Hayes, Royal Army Service Corps.
- No. T/22280628 Company Quartermaster Sergeant Ralph Hickson, Royal Army Service Corps, Territorial Army.
- No. 22529000 Sergeant William Burrows Hill, Royal Regiment of Artillery.
- No. 2187605 Sergeant Richard James Holdstock, Corps of Royal Engineers.
- No. W/279730 Sergeant Margaret Moore Howie, Women's Royal Army Corps.
- No. S/21125535 Sergeant John Hutchinson, Royal Army Service Corps.
- No. 3594305 Colour-Sergeant (acting) Rodger Joseph Irving, The Border Regiment.
- No. 810492 Staff-Sergeant (Artillery Clerk) James Jones, Royal Regiment of Artillery, Territorial Army.
- No. Car.1010 Warrant Officer Class II Jonathon Kasange, East African Armoured Corps.
- No. 6396294 Staff-Sergeant (now Warrant Officer Class II) Edward Frank Kennard, Royal Regiment of Artillery.
- No. 11058954 Battery Quartermaster-Sergeant Thomas Kerr, Royal Regiment of Artillery, Territorial Army.
- No. 5879992 Warrant Officer Class II (acting) Gordon Walter King, Royal Army Dental Corps.
- No. S/14208870 Staff-Sergeant Leonard Alfred Knight, Royal Army Service Corps.
- No. 7265576 Staff Sergeant Michael Lacey, formerly Army Catering Corps, now Royal Army Medical Corps.
- No. 14564057 Sergeant William McCann, Corps of Royal Engineers, Territorial Army.
- No. 19044525 Staff-Sergeant (acting) Francis Robert Charles Meade, Intelligence Corps.
- No. 3053152 Warrant Officer Class II (acting) George Moffat, Corps of Royal Military Police.
- No. N.8152 Warrant Officer Class II Clement Mukasa, The King's African Rifles.
- No. 21003831 Staff-Sergeant John Mulligan, Royal Regiment of Artillery, Territorial Army.
- No. 7676675 Staff-Sergeant William Charles Myers, Royal Army Pay Corps.
- No. 22207119 Sergeant (acting) Frederick George Patrick O'Brien, Royal Regiment of Artillery.
- No. 21185200 Sergeant Reginald Maurice Quinnell, Corps of Royal Engineers, Territorial Army.
- No. 6403001 Colour Sergeant (acting) (now Sergeant) Frank Redpath, The Middlesex Regiment (Duke of Cambridge's Own).
- No. 14463322 Staff-Sergeant (acting) Frederick William Rose, Corps of Royal Electrical & Mechanical Engineers.
- No. W/6881 Staff-Sergeant (acting) Agnes Galloway Russell, Women's Royal Army Corps.
- No. S/198860 Warrant Officer Class II (acting) Thomas Joseph Sullivan, Royal Army Service Corps.
- No. S/854586 Staff Sergeant Frederick Swift, Royal Army Service Corps.
- Company Sergeant-Major Syed Mohamad bin Syed Hussin, Singapore Army Service Corps, Singapore Volunteer Corps.
- No. 4267770 Colour-Sergeant (Drum Major) David Taylor, Scots Guards.
- No. 14453384 Warrant Officer Class I (acting) (Foreman of Signals) William Henry Thomas, Royal Corps of Signals.
- No. S/22053229 Sergeant (acting) Dennis Udell Wilkinson, Royal Army Service Corps.
- No. 7264492 Staff-Sergeant Vincent Zerafa, Royal Army Medical Corps.

Royal Air Force

- Sergeant Major Ivor Nesbit, Southern Rhodesia Air Force.
- 564079 Flight Sergeant Herbert John Almond.
- 532445 Flight Sergeant James Boocock.
- 563837 Flight Sergeant Horace Button.
- 562503 Flight Sergeant (now Warrant Officer) Leonard George Cankett.
- 564844 Flight Sergeant Collin Dalton.
- 565168 Flight Sergeant Raymond Arthur Donovan.
- 564672 Flight Sergeant Bertram Kenneth Gardiner.
- 562184 Flight Sergeant Francesco Raymond Lucas.
- 362479 Flight Sergeant Norman Alfred Charles Lunn.
- 904444 Flight Sergeant Fionan McCarthy.
- 565109 Flight Sergeant Walter Stuart Sharp.
- 560523 Chief Technician Thomas Edward Beale.
- 566195 Chief Technician Norman Henry Pearce.
- 646880 Sergeant John Alfred Basham.
- 1014911 Sergeant Lawrence Raymond Bird.
- 516028 Sergeant Robert Crosby.
- 514788 Sergeant Ronald William Daintrey.
- 531992 Sergeant Ronald Elliott.
- 571287 Sergeant Eric Hewison.
- 569940 Sergeant Stanley Douglas Johnson.
- 524700 Sergeant Reginald Kernohan.
- 566599 Sergeant Andrew Armstrong Millar.
- 1353130 Sergeant John Roland Russell.
- 892285 Sergeant Kathleen Walker, Women's Royal Air Force.
- 572773 Sergeant Basil Henry Wright.
- 1256243 Corporal Eric Alfred Myall.
- 2682522 Corporal Ralph Victor Frederick Robins, Royal Auxiliary Air Force.
- 709017 Junior Technician Wieslaw Stanislaw Binek.
- 2367182 Senior Aircraftman Henry John Reginald Matthews.
- 2464334 Leading Aircraftman Leslie Henry Osborne.

Civil Division

- Alice Gertrude Martha Alexander, Housekeeper, Supplies Department, General Post Office (Stamford Hill, N16).
- Bert Cecil Archer, Head Foreman, Blackstone & Co. Ltd., Stamford, Lincolnshire.
- Harry Edward Ashthorpe, Centre Lathe Turner, K & L Steel Founders & Engineers Ltd., Letchworth.
- Joshua Cyril Atkinson, Honorary Chief Collector, Savings Group, National Gas & Oil Engine Co. Ltd., Ashton-under-Lyne.
- William Charles Atkinson, Head Office Keeper, Commonwealth Relations Office (Wembley).
- William John Alexander Bain, Foreman-in Charge, Testbed Site, Treforest, British Overseas Airways (Cardiff).
- Matthew Baker, Colliery Deputy, East Midlands Division, National Coal Board (Kimberley).
- Henry John Banks, Skilled Fitter, Air Service Training Ltd., Southampton.
- Frederick Benjamin Bard, Mechanic-Leading Man, Research Laboratories, General Electric Co., Wembley.
- Gilbert Edward Barrett, Valveman, Oxford Gasworks, Southern Gas Board.
- John Batchelor, Daywageman, East Midlands Division, National Coal Board (Newton, Derbyshire).
- Eleanor Beal, Honorary Collector, Street Savings Groups, Barking, Essex.
- Walter Beardall, Quartermaster, MV Port Macquarie, Port Line Ltd (Ipswich).
- George Bell, Development Worker, Northern (Northumberland & Cumberland) Division, National Coal Board (Newburn-upon Tyne).
- Ernest Belshaw, Electrician, North Western Electricity Board (Manchester).
- William Bentley, Blacksmith, Safety in Mines Research Establishment, Buxton.
- William Howard Blagburn, Works Manager, Hardy Bros (Alnwick) Ltd., Alnwick.
- Cecil Mary Blind, Centre Organiser, Women's Voluntary Services, Maldon, Essex.
- Ernest William Bones, Clerk of Works, Grade Ii, RAF, Biggin Hill (Sutton).
- Hugh Boyd, Hand Laster, Saxone Shoe Co. Ltd., Kilmarnock.
- Elizabeth Braddock, Craftswoman, Grade I, Ministry of Works (East Molesey).
- James Brennan, Postman, Head Post Office, Stoke-on-Trent.
- John Britnell, Postal and Telegraph Officer, Eastern District, General Post Office (Ilford).
- Albert Burton, Foreman (Resident Maintenance), Rampton Hospital, Ministry of Works (Retford).
- Thomas Stewart Calderwood, Machinist, Ford Motor Co., Ltd (ILford).
- Henry Carter, School Staff Instructor, Christ's Hospital Combined Cadet Forces (Horsham).
- William John Carter, Check Weighman, South Western Division, National Coal Board (Glutton).
- Elsie Cassie, Fishworker, Peterhead, Aberdeenshire.
- William Tyndall Casson, Leading Draughtsman, War Office Works Services, Belfast.
- Frank Clarke, Airway Repairer, South Eastern Division, National Coal Board (Ramsgate).
- George Cole, Agricultural Worker, Bishops Sutton, near Alresford, Hampshire.
- William Richard Coombe, Works Superintendent, J. & F. Pool Ltd., Hayle, Cornwall.
- Harold Ambrose Copsey, Assistant Foreman, Royal Gun & Carriage Factories, Ministry of Supply, Woolwich (Sidcup).
- James William Coulthard, Stores Class Grade III, Ministry of Supply Storage Depot, Eastriggs.
- Herbert George Cox, Chief Wardmaster, Ministry of Pensions Hospital, Chepstow.
- Malvern Willie Coy, Mechanic, National Physical Laboratory, Department of Scientific and Industrial Research (Weybridge).
- Mabel Critten, Commandant, 30th Suffolk Detachment, British Red Cross Society (Southwold).
- Edward Curt, Mess Steward, Class I, Royal Air Force College, Cranwell (Leasingham).
- Andrew Davidson, Mine Fan Runner Builder, Davidson & Co. Ltd., Belfast.
- Joseph Davies, Boilermaker, General Chemicals Division, Imperial Chemical Industries, Liverpool (Widnes).
- Leslie Katherine Davies, Centre Organiser, Women's Voluntary Services, Glutton Rural District (Litton).
- Anthony Davis, Lately Driver at Her Majesty's Embassy, Vienna.
- Harry Davis, Chief Artist, Worcester Royal Porcelain Co. Ltd. (Worcester).
- James John Hogg Davison, Sub-District Commandant, Ulster Special Constabulary (Moneymore).
- Lily Dawes, Lately Woman Police Inspector, Metropolitan Police Force (Tooting, SW17).
- Albert Dean, Foreman, Turbine Room (Shift), South Eastern Division, British Electricity Authority (Portslade).
- Charles Martin Dicker, Honorary Chief Collector, Rossington Colliery Savings Group, Doncaster.
- Jean Campbell Dickinson, Centre Organiser, Women's Voluntary Services, Penrith Rural District (Lazonby).
- James Donnellan, Daywageman, North Western Division, National Coal Board (Golborne).
- William Barras Downie, Chief Inspector, W.F. Stoddard & Co. Ltd., Elderslie (Johnstone).
- Jessie Drysdale Duke, Commandant, Angus No.4 Detachment, British Red Cross Society (Brechin).
- Frederick Ernest Dunster, Charge Hand Labourer, No.3 Maintenance Unit, RAF Milton.
- Samuel Morse Dunstone, Chief Foreman, Victoria and Albert Museum (Bushey Heath).
- Alfred Harry Ebbs, Foreman Caulker and Welder, J.S. White & Co. Ltd., Cowes, Isle of Wight.
- Samuel Herbert Eglinton, First Police Reserve, Birmingham City Police Force.
- Charles Elliott, Chargehand Aerial Erector, RAF Stanbridge (Leighton Buzzard).
- George Emms, Lately Footwear Inspector Board of Trade (Leicester).
- David Enders, Chief Officer, Class I, HM Prison Wandsworth.
- Ernest William Farrow, Skipper Owner, Fishing Vessel Better Hope, Grimsby.
- Herbert Foster, Chief Die Designer, Daniel Doncaster & Sons Ltd., Sheffield.
- Eveline Furlonger, Salvage Specialist, Headquarters, Women's Voluntary Services, London (Chelsea, SW3).
- David Mill Galloway, Donkeyman, MV Regent Lion, C. T. Bowring & Co. Ltd. (Glasgow).
- Maurice Gardner, Carpenter, MV Lairds Ben, Burns & Laird Lines Ltd. (Glasgow).
- Florence Anne Garside, Canteen Manageress, RAF Station Weeton (Rochdale).
- Frank Henry Gilbert, Overseer, Shore Wireless Service, Admiralty (Cupar).
- James Gordon, Leading Firefighter, Scottish Division, National Coal Board (Kirkcaldy).
- Thomas William Goss, Fitter, West Midlands Division, National Coal Board (Nuneaton).
- James Edward Graham, Boiler Foreman, North Eastern Division, National Coal Board (Featherstone).
- Edward Grainger, Technician IIB, General Post Office, Birmingham (Smethwick).
- Isabella Grant, Head of Clothing Exchange, Women's Voluntary Services, Aberdeen.
- Edward Chandler Gravestock, Commandant, Northamptonshire Special Constabulary (Kettering).
- George Green, Chief Messenger, London District Headquarters, War Office (Lambeth, SE1).
- Gladys Georgina Catherine Green, Assistant Supervisor (Telegraphs), General Post Office, Torquay.
- Hannah Haley, Blackplate Mill Opener, Briton Ferry Steel Co. Ltd., Port Talbot.
- Elizabeth Ethel Hall, Cook, RAF, Hospital, Uxbridge (Hillingdon).
- John Hall, Boiler Stoker, Walsall Division, West Midlands Gas Board (Tipton).
- Walter George Hall, Dining Room Supervisor, Union Jack Club, London (Twickenham).
- Andrew Hamilton, Underground Pumper, Scottish Division, National Coat Board (Lesmahagow).
- John James Hammal, Captain, Sunderland South Volunteer Life Brigade.
- Alfred Edgar Hardwick, Plant Engineer, Suffolk Iron Foundry (1920) Ltd., Stowmarket.
- Frank Percival Harrison, Bandmaster, Bluejacket Band, Portsmouth.
- Marie Haynes, Group Officer, Liverpool Fire Brigade (Leicester).
- Ralph Harold Hedgecock, Laboratory Worker, "B" Leading Hand, Ministry of Supply (Crayford).
- Emily Hedges, Chief Supervisor, Head Post Office, Coventry.
- Horace Gideon Heyes, Senior Instructor, No.8. (Basic Trade) Training Battalion, REME, War Office (West Monkton).
- Winifred Higgins, Chief Telephone Operator, Grayson, Rollo & Clover Docks Ltd., Liverpool.
- Henry Hill, Coast Preventive Man, Gairloch, Board of Customs & Excise.
- George Hinch, Senior Service Engineer, F. Perkins Ltd., Peterborough.
- George Edward Hiscock, Depot Inspector, Southampton Corporation Transport Department.
- Sarah Holliday, Honorary Collector, Street Savings, Group, Newcastle upon Tyne.
- Roland Frederick Hooton, Office Keeper, Privy Council Office (West Croydon).
- Percy Henry Hore, Coastguard Writer, HM Coastguard, St. Ives, Cornwall.
- Eileen Howells, Production Supervisor, Flex Fasteners Ltd., Rhondda.
- John William James Hughes, Technical Officer, Tideway Telephone Exchange, General Post Office (Eltham, SE9).
- Gertrude Humphries, Domestic Front Officer, Women's Voluntary Services, York.
- William Hutchins, Officers' Mess Steward, Joint School of Chemical Warfare, War Office, Porton.
- James Innes, Member, Coast Life-Saving Corps and Watcher-in-Charge, Auxiliary Station, Newburgh.
- William Ivory, Head-Gardener, United Kingdom District, Imperial War Graves Commission (Woking).
- Crawshay James, Carpentry Instructor, Kingswood Approved School, Bath.
- Mary Jane Johns, Scale Payment Sub-Postmistress, Upper Loughor Post Office, Gorseinon, Swansea.
- Daniel Jones, Colliery Repairer, South Western Division, National Coal Board (Merthyr Tydfil).
- Harold Jones, Caretaker, Royal Signals TA Centre, Manchester.
- James Mason Jones, Aircraft Assembler & Shop Convenor, De Havilland Aircraft Co. Ltd., Chester.
- Philip Noel Jones, DCM, Regimental Sergeant Major, Duke of York's Royal Military School, Dover.
- Albert Edward Judd, Head Steward, Royal Naval Engineering College, Plymouth.
- Harry Kateley, Chargehand Tool Maker, Royal Aircraft Establishment, Ministry of Supply, Farnborough (Guildford).
- Frederick Kempson, Maintenance Engineer, Josiah Parkes Ltd., Willenhall.
- Walter John Kent; Liftman, Eastern Central District Office, General Post Office (Ilford).
- Alfred George King, Lately Works Overseer, Grade III, HM Stationery Office (Potters Bar).
- John Thomas Kirk, Depot Manager, Coventry House Coal Distribution (Emergency) Scheme.
- James Laverty, Greaser, SS Slieve Bawn, British Transport Commission, Railway Executive (Belfast).
- Leonard Lawson, Depot Manager, Middlesbrough, House Coal Distribution (Emergency) Scheme.
- George William Lloyd, Carpenter, MV Auricula, Anglo-Saxon Petroleum Co., Ltd (Newport).
- John George Longhurst, Machinist, Parsons Marine Steam Turbine Co. Ltd., Wallsend-on-Tyne (Felling-on-Tyne).
- Norris Ford Longworth, Assistant Overseer, Grade I, Admiralty, Glasgow.
- Harry Lord, Battery Plate Cutter, Chloride Batteries Ltd., Manchester (Kearsley).
- William Richard Hudson Lorimer, Sales and Distribution Superintendent, Alnwick Unit (Blyth Division), Northern Gas Board (Alnwick).
- Thomas Richard Lunn, Office Keeper, Grade III, Metropolitan Police Office, New Scotland Yard (Battersea, SW11).
- John MacDonald, Waterman, North of Scotland Hydro-Electric Board, Kingussie.
- James McGarroch, Lately Shift Foreman, Paisley District Undertaking, Scottish Gas Board (Paisley).
- Percy William John Matthews, Building Foreman, Hayle Power Station, South Western Division, British Electricity Authority (Penzance).
- Amelia Louise Mayhew, Forewoman, Mansell, Hunt Catty & Co. Ltd. (Kentish Town, NW5).
- Ernest William Thomas Miller, Technical Assistant, 2 Base Workshops, Middle East Land Forces.
- Henry Fox Mitchell, Forester, Grade I, Ministry of Agriculture, Northern Ireland (Hillsborough).
- William Mitchell, Chief Inspector, Head Post Office, Belfast.
- George William Morris, Temporary Postal and Telegraph Officer, Head Post Office, Nottingham.
- George Murdie, Underground Daywageman, Northern (Northumberland & Cumberland) Division, National Coal Board (Blyth).
- James Murphy, Boiler Fireman, Yoker Power Station, South West Scotland Division, British Electricity Authority (Renfrew).
- Frederick John Nelmes, Lately Head Forester Forestry Commission (Cranbrook).
- William Charles Neville, Charge-hand Carpenter, Southern Electricity Board (Swindon).
- Frederick Newell, Foreman, Ancient Monuments, Ministry of Works (Becontree).
- William O'Rourke, Works Manager, Government Wool Disinfecting Station, Ministry of Labour & National Service, Liverpool.
- Thomas Charles Owen, Supervisor of Transport, Whitbread & Co. Ltd. (Brewers), Brussels.
- William Joseph Packer, Yard Chargehand, Meryseyside & North Wales Electricity Board (Chester).
- Frederick Parker, Senior Tooling Foreman, Mather & Platt Ltd., Manchester.
- Elizabeth White Paton, Supervisor, Merrylee Telephone Exchange, Glasgow (St Andrews).
- Frederick William Perrin, Office Keeper, Grade I, Ministry of Supply (Dalston, E8).
- Clarence George Phillips, Head Foreman, Uskside Engineering Co. Ltd., Newport, Monmouthshire.
- Henry Arthur Pitts, Technician I, Telephone Manager's Office, Belfast.
- Elsie Pogson, Head Forewoman, James Smith & Co. (Derby) Ltd., Rhymney (New Tredegar).
- William Poppleton, Checkweighman, North Eastern Division, National Coal Board (Middlestown).
- Robert Percival Port, Safety Officer, James Mackie & Sons Ltd., Belfast.
- Edward Ernest Prescott, Civilian Warrant Officer, No.1982 (Huyton) Squadron, Air Training Corps (Prescot).
- Edward Raistrick, Fitter, Birkshall Gasworks, Bradford, North Eastern Gas Board.
- Theodore Laurence Randall, Station Officer, Norfolk Fire Brigade (Cromer).
- James Redfern, Foreman Coppersmith, James Troop & Co. Ltd., Liverpool.
- Harry Riley, Sub-Officer, Lancashire Fire Brigade (Colne).
- George Windsor Rimron, Fittings Foreman, Wales Gas Board (Port Talbot).
- John Albert Roberts, Motor Mail Driver, Parcel Post Office, Liverpool.
- John Christopher Robinson, Coal Hewer, Durham Division, National Coal Board (Easington Colliery).
- James Roger, Chief Electrical and Mechanical Engineer, Refractory Brickworks, Manuel (Whitecross).
- Ada Rollin, Honorary Organiser and Collector, Street Savings Group, Lurgan, County Armagh.
- John William Rowling, Foreman-in-Charge, Farrar Boilerworks Ltd., Newark-on-Trent.
- Frederick Allen Scott, Staff Foreman, Tar & Ammonia Products Works, Beckton, North Thames Gas Board (East Ham, E6).
- Charles Thomas Sheather, DSM, Lately Senior Shipkeeper, Clyde Division, Royal Naval Volunteer Reserve (Glasgow).
- James William George Simmons, Head Office Inspector, Railway Executive (Raynes Park, SW20).
- Charles Skelton, Chargehand Borer, Davy & United Engineering Co. Ltd., Sheffield.
- Elsie Sandys Smedley, Telephonist, General Post Office, Salford (Eccles).
- Winifred Kate Smit, Honorary Collector Street Savings Group, Maesteg.
- Charles Henry Soppet, Apprentice Supervisor, Head Wrightson & Co. Ltd., Thornaby-on-Tees (Stockton-on-Tees).
- Robert Staples, Foreman, Crescent Toy Co., Abercarn (Dagenham).
- James Starkey, Stoneman, Durham Division, National Coal Board (Sunderland).
- Benjamin John Stephens, Master Miller and Baker, HM Dockyard, Malta.
- Robert Norman Stewart, Leading Fireman, Central Area Fife Brigade, Dollar, Clackmannanshire.
- Frederick Thomas Stovell, Foreman, Scaffolding (Great Britain) Ltd., Mitcham, Surrey (Holloway, N7).
- Robert John Stuthridge, Labourer, Silley, Cox & Co. Ltd., Falmouth.
- Walter Sugg, Clerk of Works, Abbey and Margam Works, Steel Company of Wales (Bridgend).
- Frederick William Summerfield, Ambulance Driver, London Ambulance Service (The Hyde, NW9)
- William Swift, Permanent Labourer, Port of London Authority (Bethnal Green, E2).
- John Taylor, Bakehouse Manager, Can & Co. Ltd., Carlisle.
- Frederick Daniel Tee, Chief Office Keeper, Ministry of Labour & National Service (Heston).
- Lugrezio Teuma, Courier Driver at Her Majesty's Embassy, Tehran.
- George William Thurley, Assistant Superintendent (Counter and Writing), London Telecommunications Region, General Post Office (Sydenham, SE26)
- John Henry Timmins, Underground Repairer, West Midlands' Division, National Coal Board (Gornal Wood).
- Thomas Tinsley, Charge-Hand Stager, Short Brothers & Harland Ltd., Belfast.
- Wallace Tucker, Foreman of Labourers, Admiralty (Palmers Green, N13).
- Arthur Turner, Toolmaker & Chief Mechanical Engineer (Road Services) Department, London Transport Executive (Lee, SE12).
- Frederick Usher, Auxiliary Plant Attendant, North Eastern Division, British Electricity Authority (Sunderland).
- Nora Wall, Chief Honorary Collector, Merrow South Savings Group, Guildford.
- Edward Warne, Assistant Foreman, Royal Aircraft Establishment, Ministry of Supply, Farnborough (Leyton, E10).
- Albert Webb, Lately Journeyman Blockprinter, G. P. & J. Baker Ltd., London (Dartford).
- Gales Simmons Wells, Relief Manager, (Merchant Navy Welfare Board (Hornchurch).
- James Henry Wesley, Office Keeper Grade III, Charity Commission (Hayes).
- John William Whitworth, Assistant Divisional Officer, Worcester City and County Fire Brigade (Stourbridge).
- Geoffrey Wild, R&E Mechanic Grade I (Charge Hand), Fighting Vehicles Proving Establishment, Ministry of Supply (Cove).
- Harry Wilkins, Head Gardener, North-West European District, Imperial War Graves Commission.
- Lawrence Melville Williams, Chargeman, North Western Division, National Coal Board (Swinton).
- Abram Wilson, Foreman Fitter, South East Scotland Division, British Electricity Authority (Dunfermline).
- Mary Theodora Wilton, Honorary Collector, West Lulworth Savings Group, Wareham.
- Hee Wong, Overseer Grade II, HM Naval Base, Singapore.
- Walter Woodhead, Storekeeper-Fitter, Elsecar Works, East Midlands Gas Board (Barnsley).
- James William Worsfold, Office Keeper, Exchequer & Audit Department (Camberwell, SE5).
- Elizabeth Kirk Wotherspoon, Police Sergeant, Renfrewshire Constabulary (Paisley).
- Harry Beattie Young, School Staff Instructor, Leeds Grammar School, Combined Cadet Force.

State of Tasmania

- Cyril Charles Chaffey, Member, Hobart Sub-Branch, Returned Soldiers League.
- Frederick William Millar, Member, Hobart Sub-Branch, Returned Soldiers League.

Colonial Empire

- Christopher Barzillai Antrobus, Turnkey, Prison Department, Bahamas.
- Nelson Glanville, McFarlane Major, Headteacher, Education Department, Bahamas.
- Millicent Knight, Supervisor, Alms House, Georgetown, British Guiana.
- Samuel Oliver Young, Coxswain, Customs Boats, British Honduras.
- Yannaki Photi, Inspector of Water Supplies, Water Supply and Irrigation Department, Cyprus.
- Costas Theocli, Inspector of Water Supplies, Water Supply and Irrigation Department, Cyprus.
- Inche Bedin bin Asrah, Revenue Outdoor Officer, Special Grade No.52, Federation of Malaya.
- Chia Hoi Yuen, Vice-President, Kluang Branch, Malayan Chinese Association, Federation of Malaya.
- Inche Hassan bin Haji Mohamed, Penggawa Belimbing, Ulu Kelantan, Federation of Malaya.
- Daop Muda Abdul Malek bin Mohammed Sidek, Penghulu Mukim Kerdau, Kerdau, Federation of Malaya.
- Marutha Vanniar Subramaniam, Leading Hand Fitter, Gemas, Federation of Malaya.
- Nong Taib bin Santan, Ketua Kampong, Kampong Ulu Cheka, Federation of Malaya.
- Santaipillai Sebamalai Thambumuthu, Hospital Assistant, Special Grade, Medical Department, Jelebu District, Federation of Malaya.
- Plamuttil Vergis Thomas, Assistant Veterinary Officer, Kuantan, Federation of Malaya.
- Wan Yaacob bin Wan Ahmad, Home Guard Inspector, Ulu Kelantan, Federation of Malaya.
- Ho Yau, Foreman Class I, Public Works Department, Hong Kong.
- Japhet Dibo Akirie, Special Grade Instructor, Medical Department, Kenya.
- John Richard Cheatle Davis, Superintendent of Transport and Buildings, Government House, Nairobi.
- Omari Mohamed, Dresser Grade I, Native Civil Hospital, Mombasa, Kenya.
- Samuel Levi, 1st Grade Clerical Interpreter, Judicial Department, Mombasa, Kenya.
- Ardesir Rustomji Talati, lately 1st Grade Clerk, Immigration Department, Mombasa, Kenya.
- Wainaina Wambanya, Agricultural Instructor, Agricultural Department, Kenya.
- Chong Yin Chau, Staff Nurse, North Borneo.
- Mohammed Ibrahim, Head Rigger (Bridge Gang), Railway Department, North Borneo.
- Kambuga Byebaliro, Clerk, Grade I, General Division, Junior Service, Accountant General's Department, Tanganyika.
- Lila Jumbe, Head Correspondence Clerk, Pangani District Office, 1st Grade Clerk, Junior Service, Tanganyika.
- Gideon Ronald Phiri, Game Scout, Junior Service, General Division, Tanganyika.

=== Royal Victorian Medal (RVM) ===
- William John Bateman.
- Alexandra Janet Campbell.
- David George Howell.
- John Charles May.

=== Royal Red Cross (RRC) ===
- Hilda Burrell Durey, ARRC, Superintending Sister (Acting Matron), Queen Alexandra's Royal Naval Nursing Service.
- Major Edna Musgrave Gaunt, Queen Alexandra's Royal Army Nursing Corps.

==== Bar to the Royal Red Cross ====
- Colonel Edith Mary Beatrice Dyson, OBE, RRC (206106), Queen Alexandra's Royal Army Nursing Corps.

==== Associate of the Royal Red Cross (ARRC) ====
- Agnes Mary Isabel Doreen Hardy, Superintending Sister, Queen Alexandra's Royal Naval Nursing Service.
- Captain Constance Creasey Cosh (206922), Queen Alexandra's Royal Army Nursing Corps.
- Captain Lorna Suzanne Lindfield (316921), Queen Alexandra's Royal Army Nursing Corps.
- Captain Susanna Rhys-Jones (206430), Queen Alexandra's Royal Army Nursing Corps.
- Major Mary Josephine Scannell (206472), Queen Alexandra's Royal Army Nursing Corps.
- Una Holm Mackenzie (5137), Princess Mary's Royal Air Force Nursing Service.
- Alison Blyth Miller (5268), Princess Mary's Royal Air Force Nursing Service.

=== Air Force Cross (AFC) ===
Wing Commander

- John Basil Holgate, DFC (33426), RAF.
- Ian Neill Munro Macdonald (33387), RAF.

Acting Wing Commander

- Alan Charles Rawlinson, DFC (59236), RAF.
- Cuthbert William Stewart Thomas (40189), RAF.

Squadron Leader

- Arthur Ashworth, DSO, DFC (43699), RAF.
- Ernest Cassidy, DFC (40507), RAF.
- Donald William Beresford Farrar, DFC (106062), RAF.
- John Watson Foster, DFC (134757), RAF.
- Robert Horsley Golightly, DFC (60117), RAFRO.
- Donald Ernest Kingaby, DSO, DFM (112406), RAF.
- Lancelot Alexander Alister Mackilligin (128629), RAF.
- Geoffrey Francis Morley-Mower, DFC (40557), RAF.
- Clive King Saxelby, DFC (36275), RAF.
- William Edward Thomas (60824), RAF.

Acting Squadron Leader

- Leslie Bernard Foskett (150047), RAF.
- John Robert Gibbons (150312), RAF.
- Peter Neville Speed (150119), RAF.

Flight Lieutenant

- Robert Norman Bates (58049), RAF.
- Douglas Raymond Buchan (02253), RAAF.
- William Black Cairns (1672391), RAF.
- William Edward Caldecott (156924), RAF.
- Alan Christopher Capper (202241), RAF.
- Ronald George Collins (161398), RAF.
- Brian Ralph Anthony Cox (58305), RAF.
- James Grossman, DSO (500714), RAF.
- William John Crozier (132617), RAF
- Andrew Deytrikh (111248), RAuxAF.
- William Alfred Hardham, DFC (59656), RAFRO.
- Peter Evelyn Laird, DFC (158126), RAF.
- Henry Alexander Maule (115782), RAF.
- Harry Leonard Mellor (51739), RAF.
- Clifford Dixon Arthur Oxley (189849), RAF.
- Edward Cyril Powles (55598), RAF.
- Brian Hope Reece (153079), RAF.
- Kenneth Russum (189214), RAF.
- William Gordon Shearer (141528), RAF.
- Brian Widdup Slater (141376), RAF.
- Frederick William Sledmere (162087), RAF.
- Brian Gerald Tivy Stanbridge (163507), RAF.
- Dixon Frederick White (124776), RAF.
- David Wood (167218), RAF.

Master Pilot

- Raymond Charles Dawe (1311951), RAF.
- Waclaw Niezrecki (782373), RAF.
- Kenneth George Sneller (1330764), RAF.

Master Engineer

- James Lincoln Pickersgill (567743), RAF.

==== Bar to Air Force Cross ====
Squadron Leader

- John Campbell, AFC (120526), RAF.
- Alan Lawrence Law, DFC, AFC (44777), RAF.

Flight Lieutenant

- Stanley John Hubbard, DFC, AFC (179943), RAF.
- Cecil Allen Tomlinson, AFC (150683), RAF.

=== Air Force Medal (AFM) ===
Flight Sergeant

- 1456892 John Albert Brindley, RAF.
- 1459571 Raymond Carus Davis, RAF.
- 574825 Godfrey Richard Duval, RAF.
- 704441 Jerzy Kmiecik, RAF.
- 1323537 James Price, RAF.
- 578771 David William Stephen Sacree, RAF.
- 1319786 John Dennis Sanders, RAF.
- 1392105 William David Souter, RAF.
- 1584329 Albert Morris Edwin Spencer, RAF.
- 568982 James David John Villis, RAF.
- 1605130 Kenneth Holbrook Wilson, RAF.

Acting Flight Sergeant

- 985355 Leslie Verdun Martin, RAF.

Sergeant

- 1065557 John Robert Brooks, RAF.
- 1605217 Horace John Moss, RAF.
- 1894330 David John Rhodes, RAF.
- 3208145 Horace Wakeman, RAF.
- 1625536 Reginald Watmore, RAF.

=== Queen's Commendation for Valuable Service in the Air ===
- Lieutenant Arthur Geoffrey Hamilton Perkins, Royal Navy

Squadron Leader

- James Gordon Harrison (50494), RAF.

Acting Squadron Leader

- Thomas Colin Imrie, DFM (114582), RAF.

Flight Lieutenant

- Patrick Ivor Briggs, DFC (152596), RAuxAF.
- Robert Bowie (58022), RAF.
- Barry Nigel Byrne (150272), RAF.
- Michael Alphonsus Clancy (49206), RAF.
- Philip Henry Thornton Clay, DFC, BEM (201190), RAF.
- John Thomas Cole (57019), RAF.
- Malcolm Russell Stewart Cunningham (156277), RAF.
- Norman Frank Curtis (53115), RAF.
- Ernest Leonard David Drake, DFC (118557), RAF.
- John Walter Everitt (187782), RAF.
- Watson Walter Forster (120188), RAF.
- John Gale (183020), RAF.
- Caryl Ramsay Gordon (166827), RAF.
- Richard Frederick Marshall-Hardy (53636), RAF.
- John Kenneth Holt (197863), RAF.
- Leon Kozlowski (500034), RAF.
- Edward Robert Wheeler Lawson (55281), RAF.
- Victor Albert Madeley (155171), RAF.
- James Carlyle Marmion (165684), RAF.
- Geoffrey Raper (525318), RAF.
- John Bruce Richardson, DFC (54857), RAF.
- Clifford James George Short (175912), RAF.
- Colin Hannington Sloan (58565), RAF.
- Cyril William Sweetman (162018), RAF.
- Robert James Trace (197610), RAFRO.

Flying Officer

- William Henry Thick (2235182), RAF.

Master Pilot

- Robert Reynolds (129364), RAF.

Flight Sergeant

- 1319383 John Richard Barlow, RAF.
- 1252755 Alan Stanley Clarke, AFM, RAF.
- 1234480 Eric Joseph Dalton, RAF.
- 1586145 Geoffrey Frederick Claydon Jenks, RAF.
- 1365706 Jack Whyte Newport, RAF.
- 950285 Douglas Skinner, RAF.
- 577783 Isaac Christmas Webb, RAF.

Sergeant

- 1821306 Frankfalter Goodwin, RAF.
- 705758 Bronislaw Szota, RAF.
- 1819434 Richard James Worthing, RAF.

=== King's Police and Fire Services Medal ===
Police

- James Crawford, Chief Constable, Ipswich County Borough Police Force.
- Charles William Johnson, Chief Constable, Dudley Borough Police Force.
- Captain Francis Richard Jonathan Peel, CBE, MC, Chief Constable, Essex County Constabulary.
- Colonel Thomas Richard Pennefather Warren CBE, DL, Chief Constable, Buckinghamshire Constabulary.
- James Henderson Dargie, Assistant Chief Constable, Northumberland County Constabulary.
- Eric Douglas McDonald, Chief Superintendent, West Riding of Yorkshire Constabulary.
- Francis Reginald Bache, Superintendent, Worcestershire County Constabulary.
- Percy Richard Collins Ellington, Detective Superintendent, Nottingham City Police Force.
- George Tendered, Superintendent and Deputy Chief Constable, Wolverhampton County Borough Police Force.
- Ernest James Stone, Superintendent, Devonshire County Constabulary.
- Sydney Stovell, Superintendent, Metropolitan Police.
- Herbert Charles Lusignea, BEM, Chief Inspector, Metropolitan Police.
- John Grant, Chief Constable, Kilmarnock Burgh Police Force.
- Douglas George Ross, OBE, Chief Constable, Sutherlandshire Constabulary.

Fire Service

- William Howard Barker, Chief Officer, Devon Fire Brigade.
- John George Jessop, Chief Officer, Wolverhampton Fire Brigade.
- Thomas Bell, Divisional Officer, Essex Fire Brigade.
- Alfred Samuel Shawyer, Divisional Officer, London Fire Brigade.
- William Harold Moore, Firemaster, Fife Area Fire Brigade.

Australia

- John Bego, Sergeant, Royal Papua and New Guinea Police Force.

Colonies

- John Pennefather Pennefather-Evans, CBE, lately Commissioner of Police, Singapore.
- Arthur Crawford Maxwell, Deputy Commissioner of Police, Hong Kong.
- Llewellyn Griffiths, CPM, Assistant Superintendent, Commandant Police Training School, Kenya.
- Robert Gordon Henderson, CPM, Commissioner of Police, Nigeria.
- John Neville Franklin, CPM, Assistant Commissioner of Police, Gold Coast.
- Ronald Godfrey Cox, Chief Fire Officer, Trinidad and Tobago.

=== Colonial Police Medal ===
Southern Rhodesia

- Leonard James Genet, Chief Inspector, British South Africa Police.
- William Norman Rowe, Inspector, British South Africa Police.
- Lieutenant-Colonel Edward Hugh D'Alessio Rowley, British South Africa Police.
- Shabo, African Station Detective Sergeant, British South Africa Police.
- Siachitema, African First Class Sergeant, British South Africa Police.

Basutoland

- Captain Mervyn Colet Manby, Assistant Superintendent of Police, Basutoland.

Bechuanaland protectorate

- Alfred Mathe Nchindo, Sergeant, Bechuanaland Protectorate Police.
- Charles Adam Webb, Senior Inspector, Bechuanaland Protectorate Police.

Swaziland

- Captain Roger Owen Hassall, Superintendent, Swaziland Police.

Colonial Empire

- Evans Lawrence Adjei, Inspector, Gold Coast Police Force.
- Rowland Newman Alcock, Senior Superintendent, Nigeria Police Force.
- Petros Andrea, Assistant Superintendent, Cyprus Police Force.
- Peter Richard Andrew, Assistant Superintendent, Federation of Malaya Police Force.
- Mtu Aritho Mtu Anthiga, Assistant Inspector, Kenya Police Force.
- Albert Clearson Washbourne Attipoe, Chief Inspector, Gold Coast Police Force.
- Hansraj Baburai, Chief Inspector, Kenya Police Force.
- Raymond Henry Thomas Beaumont, Superintendent, Sierra Leone Police Force.
- John Bossano, Constable, Gibraltar Police Force.
- Humphrey Kempthorne Bowring, Superintendent, Trinidad Police Force.
- Denis Montagu Brockwell, Assistant Superintendent, Northern Rhodesia Police Force.
- Charles Augustus Brown, Inspector, Jamaica Constabulary.
- Chop Bafum-Bum, Sergeant Major, Nigeria Police Force.
- David Graeme Carruthers, Superintendent, Gold Coast Police Force.
- Sidney George Carter, Police Lieutenant, Federation of Malaya Police Force.
- Kenneth Cleland, MBE, Deputy Commissioner, Uganda Police Force.
- Edmund William Thomas Cox, Bandmaster, Quartermaster and Firemaster, North Borneo Police Force.
- James Edward Seymour Crawford, Honorary Inspector, Auxiliary Police, Federation of Malaya.
- Dare, Inspector, Northern Rhodesia Police Force.
- Henis Hopeton Dawkins, Sergeant, Jamaica Constabulary.
- Marcus De La Hey-Moores, Assistant District Commandant, Kenya Police Reserve.
- Samuel Deygoo, Inspector, British Guiana Police Force.
- Louis John Dolivera, Assistant Superintendent, Nyasaland Police Force.
- James Moru Egbuson, Assistant Superintendent, Nigeria Police Force.
- Jacob Hendrick Englebrecht, Assistant District Commandant, Kenya Police Reserve.
- Alonzo Francis, Inspector, Grenada Police Force.
- Brigadier Sir Francis William Crewe Fetherston-Godley, OBE, Provincial Commandant, Kenya Police Reserve.
- Guy Everard Goolden, Honorary Inspector Auxiliary Police, Federation of Malaya.
- Michael Ian Newnham Gordon, Superintendent, Gold Coast Police Force.
- Charles Neville Halse, Superintendent, Northern Rhodesia Police Force.
- Abdul Hamid bin Abdullah, Sergeant Major, Federation of Malaya Police Force.
- Joseph Harris, Chief Inspector, Hong Kong Police Force.
- Haralambos Hassabis, Assistant Superintendent, Cyprus Police Force.
- William Rupert Monkman Haxworth, Assistant Superintendent, Singapore Police Force.
- John Goodridge Heard, Senior Superintendent, Nigeria Police Force.
- Robert Douglas Hardman Holmes-a-Court, Superintendent, Nyasaland Police Force.
- Stuart Sidney Hordern, Superintendent, Gold Coast Police Force.
- Jamil bin Meh, Corporal, Federation of Malaya Police Force.
- Junit bin Jamaludin, Lance Sergeant, Federation of Malaya Police Force.
- Peter Silvester Bwegaita Kasirye, Inspector, Uganda Police Force.
- Kaus bin Samat, Sub-Inspector, Federation of Malaya Police Force.
- Mohamed Khalid, son of Sikander Rawther, Inspector, Federation of Malaya Police Force.
- Mohamed Yusof Khan, Inspector, Federation of Malaya Police Force.
- Abedson Kinwa, son of Nganga, Senior Sergeant, Kenya Police Reserve.
- Ko Kim Cheng, Inspector, Federation of Malaya Police Force.
- William Thomas Lamport, Sergeant, Mauritius Police Force.
- Frederick Seymour Lawrence, Senior Superintendent, Tanganyika Police Force.
- George Lawton, Assistant Superintendent, Federation of Malaya Police Force.
- Lim Swee Teng, Inspector, Federation of Malaya Police Force.
- Loh Kian Kong, Junior Sub-Officer, Singapore Fire Brigade.
- Long bin Daud, Sub-Inspector, Federation of Malaya Police Force.
- Robert Hugh Oswald Lopdell, Provincial Commandant, Kenya Police Reserve.
- Duncan George MacPherson, Assistant Superintendent, Hong Kong Police Force.
- Nyanje Bernado Makabola, Sergeant Major, Zanzibar Police Force.
- Mikaeli Mataka, Inspector, Northern Rhodesia Police Force.
- Louis Maxime Maurice, Superintendent, Mauritius Police Force.
- Allie Measurier, Sergeant Major, Sierra Leone Police Force.
- Alan Eyeleigh Middleditch, Police Lieutenant, Federation of Malaya Police Force.
- Arthur Ernest Minns, Assistant Superintendent, Singapore Police Force.
- Mohamed bin Chik, Chief Inspector, Federation of Malaya Police Force.
- Mohamed bin Haji Hashian, Sergeant, Federation of Malaya Police Force.
- Mohamed bin Shamsudin, Assistant Superintendent, Federation of Malaya Police Force.
- Mama Moshie, Sergeant Major, Gold Coast Police Force.
- Abudu Naga, Sergeant Major, Gold Coast Police Force.
- Anslem John Nedd, Sergeant, Grenada Police Force.
- Aston Barrington Newell, Sergeant, Jamaica Constabulary.
- Norris Theodor Nissen, Assistant Superintendent, Northern Rhodesia Police Force.
- Johnston Nkwazi, Detective Assistant Sub-Inspector, Nyasaland Police Force.
- Mohamed Noor bin Ahmad, Chief Inspector, Federation of Malaya Police Force.
- Isman Nur, Inspector, Somaliland Police Force.
- Akubassie Okorie, Inspector, Nigeria Police Force.
- Emanuel Adigun Oluwole, Senior Assistant Superintendent, Nigeria Police Force.
- Eric Joseph Romer Ormiston, Senior Superintendent, Nigeria Police Force.
- Diego Ortega, Constable, Gibraltar Police Force.
- Erinayo Wilson Oryema, Inspector, Uganda Police Force.
- Othman bin Abdul Samad, Assistant Superintendent, Federation of Malaya Police Force.
- Mohol Otieno, Senior Inspector, Kenya Police Force.
- Allan Neil Outram, Superintendent, British Guiana Police Force.
- Otieno Oyugi, lately Assistant Inspector, Kenya Police Force.
- Eric Leopold Pennicott, Sergeant, Jamaica Constabulary.
- Mohammed Pilus bin Ipok, Lance Sergeant, Federation of Malaya Police Force.
- Hussein Allarakia Rahim, Chief Inspector, Zanzibar Police Force.
- Rajab bin Daman, Lance Sergeant, Federation of Malaya Police Force.
- Baba Sarakuli, Staff Sergeant Major, Court Messenger Force, Sierra Leone.
- Major Edward Dewitt Sears, Deputy Commissioner, Bahamas Police Force.
- Ali Seyyah, lately Chief Inspector, Cyprus Police Force.
- Shamsudin bin Arshad, Lance Corporal, Federation of Malaya Police Force.
- Gurbachan Singh, Sergeant Major, Federation of Malaya Police Force.
- Jagir Singh, son of Pall Singh, Assistant Superintendent, Federation of Malaya Police Force.
- Sudarshan Singh, son of Harnam Singh, Senior Inspector, Federation of Malaya Police Force.
- Walter Stanley Southwell, Assistant Superintendent, Leeward Islands Police Force.
- Thomas Henry Stockdale, Assistant Superintendent, Federation of Malaya Police Force.
- Hubert William Strathairn, Assistant Superintendent, Federation of Malaya Police Force.
- Tan Ah Seng, Detective, Singapore Police Force.
- Teoh Eng Seng, Inspector, Federation of Malaya Police Force.
- Aston Corry Thomas, Senior Superintendent, Kenya Police Force.
- Tingkas bin Maginal, Sergeant, North Borneo Police Force.
- Harry Tyler, Superintendent, Kenya Police Force.
- Jepthah Benjamin Walters, Inspector, Jamaica Constabulary.
- Walter Ronald Weber, Senior Superintendent, British Guiana Police Force.
- Terrence Dermot Widdup, Superintendent, Gold Coast Police Force.
- Stirling de Courcy Williams, Honorary Inspector, Auxiliary Police, Federation of Malaya.
- Salimonou Ore Yesufu, Inspector, Nigeria Police Force.
- Mohamed Yunus bin Salleh, Sergeant, Federation of Malaya Police Force.
- Mohamed Zain bin Naim, Sergeant, Federation of Malaya Police Force.

== Australia ==
=== Knight Bachelor ===
- Edward John Lees Hallstrom. For philanthropic and public services.
- Group Captain Hugh Raymond Guy Poate, MVO, MB, ChM, a prominent Australian surgeon.
- Fred Garner Thorpe, MC, ED. For public services.

=== Order of the Bath ===
==== Companion of the Order of the Bath (CB) ====
Military Division

- Major-General John Austin Chapman, DSO (2/3), Quartermaster-General, Australian Military Forces.

=== Order of Saint Michael and Saint George ===
==== Companion of the Order of St Michael and St George (CMG) ====
- Robert Donald Bakewell, Chairman of the Australian Woolgrowers Council.
- The Honourable Robert Christian Wilson, MLC, a member of the National Security Resources Board. For public services.

=== Order of the British Empire ===
==== Knight Commander of the Order of the British Empire (KBE) ====
Civil Division

- The Honourable Percy Claude Spender, QC, Her Majesty's Australian Ambassador to the United States of America, a former Member of the House of Representatives and Minister.

==== Commander of the Order of the British Empire (CBE) ====
Military Division

- Brigadier (temporary Major-General) Eric Winslow Woodward, DSO, OBE (2/9), Adjutant-General, Australian Military Forces.
- Brigadier Fred Bridges McAlister, ED (2/50484), Australian Military Forces.
- Air Commodore Ernest Gipps Knox-Knight, OBE, Royal Australian Air Force.

Civil Division

- Edwin McCarthy, Deputy High Commissioner in London for the Commonwealth of Australia.
- Alan Stewart Watt, Permanent Head of the Department of External Affairs.

==== Officer of the Order of the British Empire (OBE) ====
Military Division

- Lieutenant-Commander (Sp.) Maurice Samuel Batterham, Royal Australian Naval Volunteer Reserve.
- Lieutenant-Commander (E) Dennis Owen Bullen, Royal Navy.
- Commander Charles John Stephenson, Royal Australian Navy.
- Lieutenant-Colonel (Honorary Colonel) Harry Tancred Harslett, ED, Citizen Military Forces (Retired List).
- Lieutenant-Colonel Alfred Oscar McVicar (3/63), Royal Australian Army Ordnance Corps.
- Lieutenant-Colonel (Honorary Colonel) John Purdue (VX.138654), Australian Military Forces.
- Group Captain Denis Archibald John Creal, Royal Australian Air Force.
- Group Captain Colin McKenzie Henry, Royal Australian Air Force.

Civil Division

- Louisa Eileen Bakewell. For services in connection with the Commonwealth Jubilee Celebrations, 1951.
- John Thomas Fitzgerald, MBE, in recognition of his services in the Department of the Army.
- The Honourable Harry Hearn, MLC. For public services.
- Francis Anthony Meere. For public services.
- Cyril Barkley Smith, a member of the Repatriation Commission and Deputy Chairman.
- Charles Ronald Sutton, JP. For public and social welfare services.
- Frederick Henry Wheeler, First Assistant Secretary, Commonwealth Treasury.
- The Reverend Harold Manuel Wheller, a prominent member of the Methodist Church.
- Fred Wilson. For services to the Building Industry.

==== Member of the Order of the British Empire (MBE) ====
Military Division

- Acting Lieutenant Eric Douglas Willder, Royal Australian Navy.
- No.6/41 Warrant Officer Class I Cyril Henry Clark, Royal Australian Artillery.
- Captain John St. Helier Falla, DCM (2/37550), Australian Military Forces.
- Captain (Provisional) Hugh Frederick Gamble (5/20673), Royal Australian Infantry Corps.
- Lieutenant Keith Ernest Gorey (4/103), Royal Australian Army Medical Corps.
- No.4/9176 Warrant Officer Class II Robert Joseph Jones, Royal Australian Army Service Corps.
- No.3/535 Warrant Officer Class I Archibald James Martin, Royal Australian Armoured Corps.
- No.3/750 Warrant Officer Class I John Toomey, Royal Australian Engineers.
- Captain Frederick James Young (3/52008), Royal Australian Artillery.
- Squadron Leader James Rae (03315), Royal Australian Air Force.
- Acting Squadron Leader John Richard Lendrum (4040), Citizen Air Force Reserve.
- Warrant Officer Alwyn Dudley Drover (A.3957), Royal Australian Air Force.

Civil Division

- Charlie Ronald Fraser Banfield. For public services.
- George Edward Archibald Grey. For services to the Dairying Industry.
- Stanley Charles George Hawker. For services in connection with the Australian Comforts Fund, Tasmanian Division.
- Alfred Jones. For services to primary industry.
- Harold Keith Joyce. For services to returned soldiers of the Australian Capital Territory.
- Hubert William Kennedy. For public services.
- George Lawson. For services to ex-servicemen and their dependants.
- Peter Malloch, Member of the Commonwealth Dried Fruits Control Board.
- Dorothy May Marshall. For services in connection with child welfare.
- John Thomas Partridge. Formerly Superintendent of the Royal Navy House, Sydney.
- Allan Pickering, M.Econ, Honorary Secretary of the Agricultural Societies Council.
- Muriel Jean Polglaze, M.Com, in recognition of her services to the Defence Department.
- Christense Sorenson, RRC. For outstanding services to Nursing.
- Nellie Elizabeth Stronach. For services in connection with the activities of the Australian Young Women's Christian Association.
- Thelma Ann Ward. For services in connection with the education of the Deaf.
- No.4/264 Sergeant (temporary Warrant Officer Class II) John Aloysious Hepworth, Royal Australian Army Service Corps.
- No.3/1532 Sergeant Raymond Charles Mace, MM, Royal Australian Electrical and Mechanical Engineers.
- No.3/45724 Staff-Sergeant (temporary Warrant Officer Class II) Frank MacDonald Murray, Royal Australian Corps of Signals.
- No.2/861 Sergeant William Benedict Simpson, Royal Australian Infantry Corps.
- No.6/67 Sergeant (temporary Staff-Sergeant) Harold Mervyn Sims, Royal Australian Engineers.
- No.2/138896 Staff-Sergeant Leslie Edward Watson, Royal Australian Armoured Corps.

=== British Empire Medal (BEM) ===
Military Division

- A.2286 Flight Sergeant Cyril Armstrong, Royal Australian Air Force.
- A.2513 Sergeant Frederick Kelvin Howley, Royal Australian Air Force.
- A.567 Sergeant William Horace Lamp, Royal Australian Air Force.
- Chief Plumber Ernest John Kynvin, 10907, Royal Australian Navy.
- No.3/45570 Sergeant Harold Datson, Royal Australian Army Service Corps.
- No.5/9277 Corporal (temporary Sergeant) William Edward John Hammill, Royal Australian Army Medical Corps.

Civil Division

- Flora Stephens, First Housemaid, Government House, Canberra.
- Benjamin William Wright, Foreman, Grade "A", Ammunition Factory, Footscray.

=== Air Force Cross (AFC) ===
- Squadron Leader Arthur Hugh Birch (021973), RAAF.
- Squadron Leader Alan Hodges (05838), RAAF.
- Flight Lieutenant Alfred Bertram Boyle, DFC (011338), RAAF.
- Flight Lieutenant Francis James Montgomery (03384), RAAF.

=== Queen's Commendation for Valuable Service in the Air ===
- Flight Lieutenant Ian Stanley Parker (011391), RAAF.
- Flight Lieutenant Leonard Thomas McGlinchey (04421), RAAF.
- Warrant Officer Edward Murray Priester (A.22163), RAAF.
- Warrant Officer Hyman Walter Herbert Puxty (A.2191), RAAF.

== Ceylon ==
=== Knight Bachelor ===
- Paulus Edward Pieris, CMG. For social services in Colombo.

=== Order of the British Empire ===
==== Knight Commander of the Order of the British Empire (KBE) ====
Civil Division

- George Claude Stanley Corea, Ambassador for Ceylon in the United States of America.

==== Commander of the Order of the British Empire (CBE) ====
Civil Division

- David Frederick Ewen. For public and commercial services.
- Raja Hewavitarne, OBE, Minister of Labour, Industry and Commerce.
- Edward Wilmot Kannangara, OBE, lately Permanent Secretary, Ministry of Health and Local Government.

==== Officer of the Order of the British Empire (OBE) ====
Civil Division

- Lloyd Oscar Abeyaratne, MRCP, LMS, Medical Officer, Hospital for Women and Children, Colombo.
- Edmund Joseph Cooray, Commissioner of Co-operative Development.
- Elizabeth Eleanor de Zoysa Gunetilleke Rajapakse Gunasekera, MBE. For social services.
- Mahapitiyage Velin Peter Peiris, LRCP, FRCS, Visiting Surgeon, General Hospital, Colombo.
- Herman Eric Peries, MBE, Acting Deputy Secretary, Treasury.

==== Member of the Order of the British Empire (MBE) ====
Military Division

- Major Harold Bracher, Royal Army Ordnance Corps.

Civil Division

- Robert Oolhagasagaram Buell, President, Association of YMCA. Secretaries of India, Pakistan and Ceylon.
- Edmund Frederick Lorensz de Silva, Proctor of the Supreme Court. For social services in Kandy.
- Justin Aelian Fernando, LMS, Medical Practitioner, Colombo.
- Gladwin Conrad Hermon Kotalawela, Member of the Badulla Urban Council. For social services in Uva Province.
- Edley Winston Mathew, Member of Parliament for Balangoda.
- Juanyidanrallage Don Paulus Perera, Principal, Lorenz College, Colombo.
- Vairavanathar Ponnambalam, For services to the co-operative movement in Jaffna.
- David Wanigasekere. For social services in Matara.

=== Companions of the Imperial Service Order ===
- Maurice Leonard Classz, Salt Superintendent, Industries Department.

== Pakistan ==
=== Order of the Bath ===
==== Companion of the Order of the Bath (CB) ====
Military Division

- Major-General (temporary) William Lionel Douglas Veitch, CBE (17541), Special List.

=== Order of Saint Michael and Saint George ===
==== Companion of the Order of St Michael and St George (CMG) ====
- John Burt Shearer, CIE, OBE, lately Secretary, Ministry of Finance.

=== Order of the British Empire ===
==== Knight Commander of the Order of the British Empire (KBE) ====
Civil Division

- Lieutenant-Colonel Arthur John Dring, CIE, lately Chief Minister, Bahawalpur State.

==== Commander of the Order of the British Empire (CBE) ====
Military Division

- Brigadier (temporary) Herbert Lawrence Hill, OBE (AI906), Special List.

Civil Division

- Wilfred Humphrey, OBE, Deputy Director of Intelligence, Peshawar.
- Eric Alexander Franklin, Joint Secretary, Cabinet Secretariat.
- Walter Allen Scott Lewis, OBE, lately Provincial Transport Commissioner, East Bengal.

==== Officer of the Order of the British Empire (OBE) ====
Military Division

- Commander Edward Alexander Frank Weller, Royal Pakistan Navy.
- Colonel (temporary) Edwin William Hayward (27533), RARO.

Civil Division

- Charles William Ayton, MBE, Chief Administrative Officer and Deputy Secretary, Ministry of Defence.
- James William Russell, lately Chief Engineer and Secretary, Government of Sindh.
- Stanley Merry Johnson, MC, lately Deputy Chief Engineer (Bridges), North Western Railway.

==== Member of the Order of the British Empire (MBE) ====
Military Division

- Major (temporary) Edward John Gange-Harris (331561), Royal Artillery.
- Squadron Leader Thomas Fenton Frost, Royal Air Force.

Civil Division

- Maurice Rudolph Probett, Deputy Director, Central Engineering Authority.
- Reginald Wallace Thom, lately Divisional Mechanical Engineer, State Railways.
- John Langton, Deputy Chief Administrative Officer, Ministry of Defence.
- Henry Richard Roe, lately Officer Supervisor, General Headquarters.

=== British Empire Medal (BEM) ===
Military Division

- Flight Sergeant (acting Warrant Officer) Frederick Francis Xavier-Murphy, Royal Air Force.
- Flight Sergeant (acting Warrant Officer) George Arthur Stemp, Royal Air Force.
