= 1952 New Year Honours =

British royal recognitions

The New Year Honours 1952 were appointments by King George VI to various orders and honours to reward and highlight good works by citizens of the British Empire and Commonwealth. They were announced on 1 January 1952 for the British Empire, Australia, New Zealand, Ceylon, and Pakistan to celebrate the past year and mark the beginning of 1952.

The recipients of honours are displayed here as they were styled before their new honour, and arranged by honour, with classes (Knight, Knight Grand Cross, etc.) and then divisions (Military, Civil, etc.) as appropriate.

== United Kingdom ==
=== Viscounts ===
- The Right Honourable Sir John Anderson GCB GCSI GCIE FRS. For political and public services.
- The Right Honourable Brendan Bracken MP, Member for North Paddington, 1929–1945, for Bournemouth, 1945–1950, and for Bournemouth East and Christchurch since 1950. For political and public services.
- The Right Honourable Robert Spear Hudson CH MP, Member for Whitehaven, 1924–1929, and for Southport since 1931. For political and public services.
- The Right Honourable Sir Archibald Henry Macdonald Sinclair Bt KT CMG JP. For political and public services.

=== Barons ===
- The Right Honourable Edward, Earl Winterton TD JP DL, Member for Horsham, 1904–1951. For political and public services.

=== Privy Counsellors ===
- Sir James Ulick Francis Canning Alexander GCVO KCB CMG OBE. Keeper of the Privy Purse and Treasurer to the King.
- Charles Williams MP, Member for Tavistock, 1918–1922, and for Torquay since 1924. For political and public services.

=== Baronets ===
- Nigel Claudian Dalziel Colman MP, Member for Brixton 1927–1945. For political and public services.
- Robert Villiers Grimston MP, Member for Westbury since 1931. For political and public services.
- Major Richard George Proby, Bt MC JP. For political and public services.
- Colonel Sir Leonard Ropner MC TD DL MP, Member for Sedgefield 1923–1929, and for Barkston Ash since 1931. For political and public services.

=== Knights Bachelor ===
- Professor Leonard Bairstow CBE FRS, Chairman, Aeronautical Research Council.
- George Percy Barnett, Chief Inspector of Factories, Ministry of Labour and National Service.
- John Lucian Blake, Comptroller General, Patent Office.
- John Poland Bowen CBE MICE, lately Engineer-in-Chief, Corporation of Trinity House.
- Walter Russell Brain FRCP, President, Royal College of Physicians.
- Colin Campbell OBE, Town Clerk of Plymouth.
- Hugh Maxwell Casson FRIBA, lately Director of Architecture, Festival of Britain.
- Robert Catterall MBE. For political and public services in Lancashire.
- Charles Gibson Connell. For political services in Scotland.
- John Harold Corah JP. For political and public service in Leicestershire.
- Robert Furness Fryars, Chairman and Managing Director, Associated Commercial Vehicles Sales Ltd.
- Ernest William Goodale CBE MC, President, Silk and Rayon Users' Association.
- Reginald Playfair Hills OBE MC, Junior Common Law Counsel to the Board of Inland Revenue.
- Geoffrey Clegg Hutchinson MC TD KC MP, Member for Ilford, 1937–1945 and for Ilford North, since 1950. For political and public services.
- Major Herbert Leslie Joseph, Managing Director, Festival Gardens Ltd.
- Edward Herbert Keeling MC DL MP, Member for Twickenham since 1935. For political and public services.
- Colonel William John Kent CBE TD JP DL, President, British Pottery Manufacturers' Federation.
- George Palmer Laidlaw OBE, Chairman, Scottish Council of Social Service.
- Allen Lane, Founder and Managing Director, Penguin Books Ltd.
- Hans Eric Miller, Chairman, International Rubber Development Board.
- Rudolph Albert Peters MC FRS, Whitley Professor of Biochemistry, University of Oxford.
- Arthur Hampden Ronald Wastell Poyser CBE, Master in Lunacy, Supreme Court of Judicature.
- Judge John Prichard CBE, lately President of the Court of Cassation, Baghdad.
- David Randall Pye CB MIMechE FRS, lately Provost of University College, University of London.
- John Knewstub Maurice Rothenstein CBE , Director and Keeper, Tate Gallery.
- Professor Douglas Savory MP, Member for Queen's University, Belfast, 1940–1950, and for South Antrim since 1950. For political and public services.
- Alderman Alfred Ernest Shennan FRIBA JP. For political and public services in Liverpool.
- William Woodthorpe Tarn FBA, Hellenistic historian.
- Reginald Sparshatt Thatcher OBE MC FRCM FRCO, Principal of the Royal Academy of Music.
- Walford Hollier Turner JP. For political and public services in Birmingham.
- Lieutenant-Colonel George James Cullum Welch OBE MC, Alderman and recently Sheriff of the City of London.
- Alexander Williamson CBE MICE, Chairman and Managing Director, William Beardmore & Company Ltd., Glasgow.
- Alderman Bertram Wilson JP. For political and public services in the West Riding of Yorkshire.
- Professor Ernest Llewellyn Woodward FBA, Editor of Documents on British Foreign Policy.

State of Victoria

- The Honourable Charles Gavan Duffy, Justice of the Supreme Court, State of Victoria.
- The Honourable John Herman Lienhop, Agent-General in London for the State of Victoria.
- The Honourable Archie Michaelis, Speaker of the Legislative Assembly, State of Victoria.

State of South Australia

- Edward James Ranembe Morgan, President of the Industrial Court and of the Board of Industry, State of South Australia.

Southern Rhodesia

- Henry Telfer Low CBE, Vice-Chairman of the Railway Board, Southern Rhodesia. For public services.

Colonies, Protectorates etc.

- George Vance Allen CBE , Vice-Chancellor, University of Malaya.
- Ivor Llewellyn Brace, Chief Justice of the Supreme Court of Sarawak, North Borneo and Brunei.
- Commander James Grenville Pyke-Nott CMG, Royal Navy (Retd), Colonial Administrative Service, Lieutenant-Governor, Eastern Region, Nigeria.
- Eboo Pirbhai OBE. For public services in Kenya.
- George Seymour Seymour OBE. For public services in Jamaica.

=== Order of The Bath (Military Division) ===
==== Knights Grand Cross (GCB) ====
Royal Navy

- Admiral Sir Philip Louis Vian KCB KBE DSO.

Army

- General Sir Brian Hubert Robertson Bt GBE KCMG KCVO CB DSO MC ADC, late Corps of Royal Engineers, Colonel Commandant, Corps of Royal Engineers; Colonel Commandant, Corps of Royal Electrical & Mechanical Engineers.

==== Knights Commander (KCB) ====
Royal Navy

- Vice-Admiral Maurice James Mansergh CB CBE.
- Vice-Admiral (E) The Honourable Denis Crichton Maxwell CB CBE FRSA MIMechE MINA.

Army

- Lieutenant-General Sir Arthur Arnhold Bullick Dowler KBE CB, late Infantry, Colonel, The East Surrey Regiment.
- General Sir Ouvry Lindfield Roberts KBE CB DSO , late Corps of Royal Engineers.

Royal Air Force

- Air Chief Marshal Sir William Forster Dickson KBE CB DSO AFC.
- Air Chief Marshal Sir Arthur Penrose Martyn Sanders KBE CB.

==== Companions (CB) ====
Royal Navy

- Rear-Admiral Peter Grenville Lyon Cazalet DSO DSC.
- Rear-Admiral John Harvey Forbes Crombie DSO.
- Rear-Admiral William Wellclose Davis DSO.
- Surgeon Rear-Admiral Frederick George Hunt CBE .
- Rear-Admiral St John Aldrich Micklethwait DSO.
- Rear-Admiral (E) George Campbell Ross CBE AMIMechE.
- Rear-Admiral Alan Kenneth Scott-Moncrieff DSO.
- Major-General Humphry Thomas Tollemache CBE, Royal Marines.

Army

- Major-General Colin Bullard CBE MIMechE MIEE, Corps of Royal Electrical & Mechanical Engineers.
- Major-General Roderic Duncan Cameron CBE MC KHS, late Royal Army Medical Corps.
- Major-General Maurice Lea-Cox CBE, Royal Army Ordnance Corps.
- Brigadier (Acting) Douglas Inglis Crawford DSO TD ADC, late Royal Regiment of Artillery, Territorial Army.
- Major-General David Dawnay DSO, late Royal Armoured Corps.
- Major-General Maurice Brian Dowse CBE, late Infantry.
- Major-General Henry Robert Bowreman Foote VC DSO, late Royal Armoured Corps.
- Major-General Harold Francis Sylvester King CBE, Royal Army Ordnance Corps.
- Major-General Cyril Henry Norton CBE DSO, late Royal Regiment of Artillery.
- Major-General Joseph Montague Sabine Pasley CBE MVO, late Royal Regiment of Artillery.
- Major-General Joseph Howard Nigel Poett DSO, late Infantry.
- Major-General John Evered Witt CBE MC, late Royal Army Service Corps.

Royal Air Force

- Air Vice-Marshal Geoffrey Roger Cole Spencer CBE.
- Air Vice-Marshal Hugh Granville White CBE MIMechE.
- Acting Air Vice-Marshal Leslie William Cannon CBE.
- Air Commodore James Alfred Easton CBE (Retd).
- Air Commodore Herbert Dorman Spreckley OBE.
- Air Commodore Sydney Richard Ubee AFC.
- Group Captain Eric Douglas MacKinlay Nelson.

=== Order of The Bath (Civil Division) ===
==== Knights Commander ====
- Sir (William) Robert Fraser KBE CB, Deputy Chairman and Secretary, Central Land Board and War Damage Commission.
- Harold Percival Himsworth FRCP, Secretary, Medical Research Council.

==== Companions ====
- Edmond Arrenton Armstrong CBE, Under-Secretary, Ministry of Civil Aviation.
- John Foster Caldwell KC, First Parliamentary Draftsman, Ministry of Finance, Northern Ireland.
- Colonel Joseph Gerald Gaskell TD DL, Chairman, Territorial and Auxiliary Forces Association of the County of Glamorgan.
- Roscoe Herbert CMG, Under-Secretary, Ministry of Food.
- Frank Higginson CMG ARIBA, Secretary, Imperial War Graves Commission.
- Robert Henry Locke, Director of Postal Services, General Post Office.
- Edwyn James Mares, Under-Secretary, Board of Trade.
- Colonel William Mather TD DL, lately Chairman, Territorial and Auxiliary Forces Association of the County of the City of Glasgow.
- Ronald Henry Melville, Assistant Under-Secretary of State, Air Ministry.
- Arthur Douglas Owen, Commissioner, Board of Customs & Excise.
- Robert Rae, Director, National Agricultural Advisory Service, Ministry of Agriculture & Fisheries.
- Leslie Harold Robinson, Under-Secretary, Ministry of Supply.
- Frederick James Root, Under-Secretary, Ministry of Works.
- Curteis Fraser Maxwell Norwood Ryan CMG DSO MC, Assistant Under-Secretary of State, Home Office.
- Pierce Nicholas Netterville Synnott, Under-Secretary, Admiralty.
- Geoffrey Wheeler, Under-Secretary, Ministry of Defence.
- Ira Wild CMG OBE , Under-Secretary, Ministry of Transport.
- Alan Wilson, Chief Inspector of Audit, Ministry of Housing & Local Government.

=== Order of St Michael & St George ===
==== Knights Grand Cross (GCMG) ====
- Sir Charles Noble Arden-Clarke KCMG, Governor and Commander-in-Chief, Gold Coast.
- The Right Honourable Sir Oliver Shewell Franks KCB CBE, His Majesty's Ambassador Extraordinary and Plenipotentiary in Washington, D.C.

==== Knights Commander (KCMG) ====
- Anthony Foster Abell CMG, Governor and Commander-in-Chief, Sarawak.
- Reginald James Bowker CMG, Assistant Under-Secretary of State in the Foreign Office, lately His Majesty's Ambassador Extraordinary and Plenipotentiary in Rangoon.
- Andrew Benjamin Cohen CMG OBE, Governor and Commander-in-Chief Designate, Uganda.
- Percy Wynne Harris CMG MBE, Governor and Commander-in-Chief, Gambia.
- Lieutenant-Colonel Sir Rupert Hay KCIE CSI, Political Resident in the Persian Gulf.
- Major-General Sir John Noble Kennedy KCVO KBE CB MC, Governor and Commander-in-Chief of Southern Rhodesia.
- Major-General Richard George Lewis CB CBE, Director-General, Foreign Office Administration of African Territories.
- Gilbert Mackereth CMG MC, His Majesty's Ambassador Extraordinary and Plenipotentiary at Bogota.
- John Miller Martin CB CVO, Assistant Under-Secretary of State, Colonial Office.
- The Honourable Sir John Demetrius Morris, Chief Justice of the State of Tasmania.
- Patrick Stratford Scrivener CMG, His Majesty's Envoy Extraordinary and Minister Plenipotentiary in Berne.

==== Companions (CMG) ====
- Grantley Herbert Adams, Leader of the House of Assembly and Member of the Executive Committee, Barbados.
- Walter Adams OBE, Secretary, Inter-University Council for Higher Education in the Colonies and the Colonial University Grants Advisory Committee.
- Robert Blackley CBE, lately British Resident, Tripolitania.
- Major-General Geoffrey Kemp Bourne CB CBE, lately General Officer Commanding, British Troops, Berlin.
- John Catarinich , Director of Mental Hygiene, State of Victoria.
- Kenneth Arthur Davies OBE , Colonial Geological Survey Service, Director of Geological Survey, Uganda.
- Edward Victor Grace Day, Colonial Administrative Service, British Adviser, Kedah, Federation of Malaya.
- Brigadier Augustus Klingner Ferguson CBE, Military Adviser to the United Kingdom Political Representative in Tokyo.
- Charles Worthington Fowden Footman, Colonial Administrative Service, Chief Secretary, Nyasaland.
- Algernon deKewer Frampton, Colonial Agricultural Service, Agricultural Adviser to the Comptroller for Development & Welfare, West Indies
- Henry Ralph Fraser OBE. For public service in Uganda.
- Stewart Gillett, lately Director of Agriculture, Kenya, now Chairman and General Manager, Overseas Food Corporation, Kongwa, Tanganyika.
- William Allmond Codrington Goode, Colonial Administrative Service, Chief Secretary, Aden.
- John Gutch OBE, Colonial Administrative Service, Colonial Secretary, British Guiana.
- Percival Stanhope Hall CBE, Director of Bacon & Ham Division, Ministry of Food.
- Vincent Todd Harlow, Beit Professor of History of the British Empire, University of Oxford.
- Edward Christopher Haselden, Sudan Agent in Cairo.
- Howard Owen Hooper, Assistant Secretary, Ministry of Materials.
- William Gruffydd Rhys Howell OBE, Counsellor (Commercial) at His Majesty's Embassy in Stockholm.
- William Clarence Johnson CBE, lately Inspector General of Colonial Police.
- Edward Norton Jones OBE, Colonial Administrative Service, Secretary for Development, Gold Coast.
- Norman Murie MacRobert, Colonial Administrative Service, Provincial Commissioner, Sierra Leone.
- Angus Christian Edward Malcolm, Head of The Information Policy Department, Foreign Office.
- Norman Mayers, His Majesty's Ambassador Extraordinary and Plenipotentiary at Quito.
- Eugene Melville, Financial Adviser, Control Commission for Germany (British Element).
- David Loftus Morgan MBE, Resident Commissioner, Swaziland.
- Neil Pritchard, Assistant Under-Secretary of State in the Commonwealth Relations Office.
- Alexander James Reid ISO JP, Under-Treasurer and Commissioner of Stamps, State of Western Australia.
- Philip Rogers, Assistant Secretary, Colonial Office.
- John Swithun Harvey Shattock OBE, Head of the China and Korea Department, Foreign Office.
- Gerard Thomas Corley Smith, Counsellor on the United Kingdom Delegation to the United Nations, New York.
- Major-General Bertram Temple CB OBE MC, Head of the British Services Mission to Burma.
- Lieutenant-Commander Eric Welsh OBE, Royal Naval Volunteer Reserve (Retd), Ministry of Supply.
- The Honourable Edgar Cuthbert Fremantle Whitehead OBE, Minister of Finance, Southern Rhodesia.
- Colonel Ronald Evelyn Leslie Wingate CIE OBE, lately Alternate to the United Kingdom Delegate to the Inter-Allied Reparations Agency in Brussels.

=== Royal Victorian Order ===
==== Knights Commander (KCVO) ====
- Colonel North Victor Cecil Dalrymple-Hamilton of Bargany CB CVO.
- Brigadier-General Robert Chaine Alexander McCalmont CVO CBE DSO.
- Sydney Arthur White MVO.

==== Commanders (CVO) ====
- Captain Sir John Lindsay Dashwood
- Henry Clement Game MVO.
- Captain Oscar Philip Jones OBE.
- Peter James Kerley CBE FRCP.
- The Reverend John Lamb MVO .
- Robert Machray MRCS LRCP.
- The Reverend Canon William Ralph Musselwhite.

==== Lieutenants (LVO) ====
- James Francis Coote.
- Charles Edwin Drew FRCS.
- Henry Thomas Ferrier MBE.
- Peter Jones FRCS.
- Florence Mackenzie.
- Egbert Edwin Ratcliffe MVO.
- Cyril Frederick Scurr MRCS LRCP.
- Charles Ralph Warren MVO.

==== Members (MVO) ====
- Flight Lieutenant William Thomas Bussey BEM, Royal Air Force(Retd).
- Lieutenant (S) Kenneth Hall MBE, Royal Navy (Retd).
- Edwin Albert Strang Mitchell.
- Squadron Leader Horace Alexander Nash AFC, Royal Air Force.
- Geoffrey Owen Peskett.
- Flight Lieutenant Stuart Nimmo Sloan DFC CGM, Royal Air Force(Retd).

=== Order of the British Empire (Military Division) ===
==== Knights Grand Cross (GBE) ====
Royal Air Force

- Air Chief Marshal Sir Leslie Norman Hollinghurst KCB KBE DFC.

==== Dames Commander (DBE) ====
Royal Navy

- Commandant Mary Kathleen Lloyd OBE , Director, Women's Royal Naval Service.

==== Knights Commander (KBE) ====
Royal Navy

- Vice-Admiral Philip King Enright CB CBE.

Army

- Lieutenant-General Colin Bishop Callander CB MC, late Infantry.
- Lieutenant-General Alexander Maurice Cameron CB MC, late Corps of Royal Engineers.
- Lieutenant-General Lashmer Gordon Whistler CB DSO, late Infantry.

Royal Air Force

- Air Vice-Marshal Victor Emmanuel Groom CB CBE DFC.
- Air Marshal Alick Charles Stevens CB.
- Acting Air Marshal Colin Winterbotham Weedon CB CBE MIMechE .

==== Commanders (CBE) ====
Royal Navy

- Acting Rear-Admiral (S) Maurice Herbert Elliott OBE.
- Colonel Alan George Ferguson-Warren DSC, Royal Marines.
- Captain Henry Alexander King DSO (Retd.)
- Surgeon Captain Allan Watt McRorie .
- Instructor Captain Robert Edward Shaw.
- Rear-Admiral (E) Frederick Victor Stopford.
- Captain Arthur Hammond Wallis.
- Engineer Captain Harold Welch OBE.

Army

- Brigadier Charles Henry Irwin Akehurst OBE, late Royal Corps of Signals (At present on loan to the Government of India as Director of Signals at the Indian Army Headquarters).
- Colonel Richard Albert Arthur Byford MVO OBE, Army Catering Corps.
- Colonel (Acting) (Honorary Brigadier) James Salter Davenport MC, Army Cadet Force.
- Brigadier Edgar John Humphreys Douch OBE ADC, late Royal Regiment of Artillery.
- Brigadier (Temporary) George Wilfrid Eden, late Infantry.
- Brigadier (Temporary) Robert Burrell Frederick Kinglake Goldsmith, The Duke of Cornwall's Light Infantry.
- Colonel (Temporary) (Late Brigadier) (Temporary) Harold John Crossley Hildreth OBE, Royal Army Ordnance Corps.
- Brigadier (Temporary) Edward Stewart Lindsay DSO OBE, late Royal Regiment of Artillery.
- Brigadier (Temporary) Mark Stuart Ker Maunsell DSO OBE, Royal Regiment of Artillery.
- Colonel Robert Alfred Rusbridge MBE, late Royal Army Educational Corps.
- Colonel and Chief Paymaster (Brigadier (Temporary)) Ernest Thomas Coblay Smith, Royal Army Pay Corps.
- Brigadier (Temporary) William Gurdon Stirling DSO, late Royal Regiment of Artillery.
- Colonel (Temporary) John Humphrey Wakefield Willink, Coldstream Guards.

Royal Air Force

- Group Captain Charles Broughton.
- Acting Group Captain William Edward Coles DSO DFC AFC.
- Acting Air Commodore Charles Leslie Dann OBE .
- Group Captain John Martin Freeman.
- Group Captain Robert Lewitas Maudsley Hall OBE ADC.
- Group Captain Cyril Ernest Morse, (Retd).
- Air Commodore John Conrad Neely MRCS LRCP .
- Acting Group Captain William Kilpatrick Stewart AFC .
- The Reverend Canon Leslie Wright KHC.

==== Officers (OBE) ====
Royal Navy

- Commander (E) John William Albert Adams MBE.
- Lieutenant-Commander Jack Neville Bathurst DSC.
- Commander George Walter Wentworth Bayly VRD, RNVR, Singapore.
- Acting Captain Thomas Norman Becket Cree (Retd.)
- Commander Kenneth Judge D'Arcy DSO.
- Captain (Acting Lieutenant-Colonel) John Kingsmill Gardiner, Royal Marines.
- Superintendent Evelyn Louise Elizabeth Hoyer-Millar, WRNS.
- Acting Captain (S) Sydney Andrew Boyd Morant DSC.
- Commander (E) John Roland Patterson DSC AMIMechE.
- Commander Guy Neville Rolfe DSC (Retd).
- Captain Harry Meehan Sinclair, Royal Fleet Auxiliary.
- Acting Captain (S) John Samuel Swindell Smith.
- The Reverend Arthur Douglas Spear, Chaplain.

Army

- Lieutenant-Colonel (Temporary) Filmer Hughes Allsop, Royal Army Ordnance Corps.
- Lieutenant-Colonel Percy Geoffrey Bamford DSO, The Lancashire Fusiliers.
- Lieutenant-Colonel (Acting) Leonard Walter Freeman Bonnor, Army Cadet Force.
- Lieutenant-Colonel (Quartermaster) Arthur Victor Chapman, Royal Army Service Corps (Seconded to extra Regimentally Employed List).
- Lieutenant-Colonel (now Colonel (Temporary)) Patrick John Eldred Clapham, Royal Regiment of Artillery.
- Lieutenant-Colonel William Morris Wells Cooper, The King's Own Royal Regiment (Lancaster).
- Lieutenant-Colonel (Temporary) George Frederick Donovan, Royal Pioneer Corps.
- Lieutenant-Colonel (Temporary) Archibald Ian Buchanan-Dunlop DSO, The Royal Scots Fusiliers.
- Lieutenant-Colonel (Temporary) (Quantity Surveyor) Robert Charles Heaton Eagle, Corps of Royal Engineers.
- Lieutenant-Colonel (Acting) Alexander Frame, Army Cadet Force.
- Lieutenant-Colonel (Temporary) Clifford Thomas William Gough MBE, Corps of Royal Electrical & Mechanical Engineers.
- Lieutenant-Colonel Richard Noel Guest MC TD, Royal Regiment of Artillery, Territorial Army.
- Lieutenant-Colonel (Temporary) Edward Geoffrey Hollis, Corps of Royal Electrical & Mechanical Engineers.
- Major Andrew Barlow Howard, Royal Regiment of Artillery.
- Lieutenant-Colonel (Acting) Leslie Bloom Hutchings TD, Combined Cadet Force.
- Lieutenant-Colonel (Temporary) Douglas Gordon Loch, The Queen's Royal Regiment (West Surrey).
- Lieutenant-Colonel Edward Lancelot Luce DSO TD, The Wiltshire Regiment (Duke of Edinburgh's).
- Lieutenant-Colonel David Meynell, The Royal Irish Fusiliers (Princess Victoria's).
- Lieutenant-Colonel John Edward Longworth Morris DSO, Royal Regiment of Artillery.
- Lieutenant-Colonel James Harold Eric Panton, Royal Corps of Signals.
- Lieutenant-Colonel John Henry Parsons, Employed List (Late Royal Regiment of Artillery).
- Lieutenant-Colonel James Douglas Pattullo, Corps of Royal Engineers.
- Lieutenant-Colonel John Chandos-Pole, Coldstream Guards.
- Lieutenant-Colonel Charles Dennis Tobin Wynn-Pope, Royal Regiment of Artillery.
- Lieutenant-Colonel John Radford, The North Staffordshire Regiment (The Prince of Wales's).
- Lieutenant-Colonel (Temporary) John Robertson Shirley, Royal Corps of Signals.
- Lieutenant-Colonel (Temporary) Richard Brian De Fontenne Sleeman MC, The Royal Sussex Regiment.
- Lieutenant-Colonel Anthony Abel-Smith, 10th Royal Hussars (Prince of Wales's Own), Royal Armoured Corps.
- Lieutenant-Colonel Douglas Frederick Gutteridge Smith, Royal Army Veterinary Corps.
- Lieutenant-Colonel (Temporary) Cyril Howard Stone MC, Corps of Royal Engineers.
- Lieutenant-Colonel Stephen Terrell TD, Parachute Regiment, Glider Pilot and Parachute Corps, Territorial Army.
- Lieutenant-Colonel Olive Mary Watson RRC, Queen Alexandra's Royal Army Nursing Corps.
- Major Reginald Arthur James Wiggins, Royal Army Ordnance Corps.
- Lieutenant-Colonel (Temporary) Anthony Edward Wilkinson MC, The Gloucestershire Regiment.
- The Reverend William David Conwyl Williams MBE , Chaplain to the Forces, Second Class, Royal Army Chaplains' Department.

Royal Air Force

- Group Officer Nan Hunter (née Dinnie), Women's Royal Air Force (Retd).
- Wing Commander Reginald Douglas Baughan.
- Wing Commander Kenneth Maynard Crick.
- Wing Commander Charles Richard John Hawkins AFC.
- Wing Commander Samuel John Jury.
- Wing Commander George James Rayner.
- Wing Commander David Clifford Torrens.
- Wing Commander Thomas Peter Francis Trudgian.
- Wing Commander Geoffrey Tupholme.
- Acting Wing Commander Geoffrey Price Howell.
- Acting Wing Commander Anthony Geoffrey Strutt.
- Acting Wing Commander John Groves Topham DSO DFC.
- Squadron Leader John Harry Chart.
- Squadron Leader Peter Gerald Desmond Farr DFC.
- Squadron Leader Henry George Messer.
- Squadron Leader Jack Bertram Wales DFC, Royal Auxiliary Air Force.
- Acting Squadron Leader John McConachie Rollo, RAFVR.
- Acting Squadron Leader George Howard Williams.

Others

- Lieutenant-Colonel Thomas Jordan, Defence Force, Southern Rhodesia.
- Lieutenant-Colonel Herbert John Rea ED, Commanding Officer, Singapore Volunteer Corps.

==== Members (MBE) ====
Royal Navy

- Mr. Richard Francis Bratt, Commissioned Recruiter.
- Second Officer Ethel Strachan Colquhoun, WRNS.
- Lieutenant George Cook DSC.
- Lieutenant William Brook Filer GM.
- Lieutenant-Commander Norman Hunter.
- Captain John Stuart Jewers, Royal Marines.
- Instructor Lieutenant-Commander Leonard Arthur Kew.
- Acting Commander William Ernest Messinger.
- Acting Lieutenant-Commander (A) James Desmond Murricane DSC, RNVR.
- Mr. Herbert John Clarence Pinch DSM, Temporary Senior Commissioned Engineer.
- Lieutenant Ronald Edwin Elliston Taylor.
- Lieutenant-Commander (S) David Henry Wiseman.
- Lieutenant-Commander (L) Albert Victor Wright (Retd.)

Army

- Warrant Officer Class II Frank Osborne Allen, Corps of Royal Electrical & Mechanical Engineers.
- Warrant Officer Class I Margaret Ashworth, Women's Royal Army Corps.
- Captain Joseph Francis Barry, The Royal Inniskilling Fusiliers.
- Captain (Quartermaster) Phillip William Bell MM, The Royal Northumberland Fusiliers.
- Warrant Officer Class I Anthony Joseph Bonnington, Royal Army Ordnance Corps.
- Warrant Officer Class I Walter Bourne, Oxfordshire & Buckinghamshire Light Infantry.
- Major (Acting) Derrick Oswald Stockdale Canale, Corps of Royal Engineers, Territorial Army.
- Captain (Quartermaster) Oliver Francis Cecil Canning DCM, Royal Tank Regiment, Royal Armoured Corps.
- Major (Temporary) Toby St. George Caulfield, Royal Regiment of Artillery.
- Warrant Officer Class I Thomas Richard Chappell, Small Arms School Corps.
- Captain Harry Potter Clayton, Royal Army Service Corps, Territorial Army.
- Major (Temporary) Francis Henderson Coutts, The King's Own Scottish Borderers.
- Major (Temporary) Herbert James Cutbush, Royal Pioneer Corps.
- Major (Quartermaster) Charles Henry Bateman Dellow, Royal Regiment of Artillery.
- Warrant Officer Class I Joseph Strong Fell, Corps of Royal Electrical & Mechanical Engineers, Territorial Army.
- Major (District Officer) Albert Victor Foreman, Royal Regiment of Artillery (Seconded to extra Regimentally Employed List).
- Major (Temporary) (Staff Paymaster, 2nd Class) Eric Brown Forster, Royal Army Pay Corps.
- Captain Leonard James Fray, Royal Army Service Corps.
- Warrant Officer Class I Sidney George Gilbert, Corps of Royal Engineers, Territorial Army.
- Warrant Officer Class II James Gordon, Royal Regiment of Artillery, Territorial Army.
- Warrant Officer Class II Ronald Guest, Royal Army Service Corps.
- Warrant Officer Class I James Thomas Hain, Royal Army Service Corps.
- Major Kenneth Stainton Hamilton, Royal Regiment of Artillery.
- Major (Quartermaster) Richard William Hammerton, Royal Regiment of Artillery.
- Warrant Officer Class II Edward Frank Harvey, Royal Army Service Corps, Territorial Army.
- Major (Temporary) (Staff Paymaster, 2nd Class) Ian Alexander Hay, Royal Army Pay Corps.
- Major (Quartermaster) John David Thomas Hillman TD, Royal Corps of Signals, Territorial Army.
- Warrant Officer Class I Herbert Hughes, Royal Regiment of Artillery.
- Major Norman Henry Overton Innes, The Seaforth Highlanders (Ross-shire Buffs, The Duke of Albany's).
- Captain Mabel Jones, Women's Royal Army Corps.
- Major (Temporary) Donald Leslie, The Green Howards (Alexandra, Princess of Wales's Own Yorkshire Regiment).
- Major Robert Goudie Macfarlane, Royal Army Medical Corps.
- Lieutenant (Quartermaster) Thomas Meredith, The Somerset Light Infantry (Prince Albert's).
- Lieutenant Harold Stewart Moore, Royal Army Medical Corps.
- Major (Acting) Charles Albert Mortimer, Army Cadet Force.
- Major (Temporary) John Fraser Moslby, Royal Tank Regiment, Royal Armoured Corps.
- Warrant Officer Class I Timothy Edward Joseph Mons Murphy, Royal Army Service Corps.
- Warrant Officer Class II James Vincent Myers, Royal Regiment of Artillery, Territorial Army.
- Major (Temporary) Alan Richard Neale MC, Corps of Royal Engineers.
- Major (District Officer) Herbert Oxford, Royal Regiment of Artillery (Seconded to extra Regimentally Employed List).
- Warrant Officer Class I (Bandmaster) Edgar Gait Robert Palmer, The Loyal Regiment (North Lancashire).
- Warrant Officer Class I William James Parry, Royal Regiment of Artillery.
- Warrant Officer Class I William Pasker, Royal Tank Regiment, Royal Armoured Corps.
- Captain (Quartermaster) William John Power, Royal Army Medical Corps.
- Major (Acting)Wilfred Calvert Rawling, Combined Cadet Force.
- Captain Percy Frederick-Charles Reed, The Bedfordshire & Hertfordshire Regiment.
- The Reverend Walter Patrick Rennison, Chaplain to the Forces, Fourth Class, Royal Army Chaplains' Department.
- Major (Acting) Walter Sidney Robinson, Army Cadet Force.
- Major (Quartermaster) Percy Edward Wellesley Rolfe MM, The Royal Fusiliers (City of London Regiment).
- Major Allan Rushton, Corps of Royal Engineers.
- Captain (Quartermaster) (Major (Temporary)) Robert Heron Shields, Royal Regiment of Artillery.
- Major (Quartermaster) Fred Lee Spary, Corps of Royal Engineers.
- Warrant Officer Class I William Edward Staddon, Royal Army Service Corps.
- Warrant Officer Class II George Edward Steele, The Wiltshire Regiment (Duke of Edinburgh's), Territorial Army.
- Major Theodore Dufton Stephen TD, The King's Own Scottish Borderers, Territorial Army.
- Major (Temporary) Wilfred George Stringer, Corps of Royal Engineers.
- Captain (Quartermaster) John Taylor MM, Royal Tank Regiment, Royal Armoured Corps.
- Warrant Officer Class I (Bandmaster) Michael Edwin Thatcher, The South Staffordshire Regiment.
- Major John Warwick Tomes, The Royal Warwickshire Regiment.
- Warrant Officer Class II Leonard Arthur Wade, The Parachute Regiment, Glider Pilot and Parachute Corps, Territorial Army.
- Major (Quartermaster) Victor Frank Welch TD, Royal Regiment of Artillery, Territorial Army.
- Major (Temporary) James Joseph Wiese, Royal Army Medical Corps.
- Major Brian Claud Withers, The Northamptonshire Regiment.
- Warrant Officer Class I John Thomas Woodward, The North Staffordshire Regiment (The Prince of Wales's).
- Major (Temporary) Douglas George Yendole, Corps of Royal Engineers.
- Warrant Officer Class I Joseph Cyril Young, Royal Army Medical Corps.

Royal Air Force

- Acting Wing Commander John Randle Hall, RAFVR.
- Squadron Leader Brinley Morgan.
- Acting Squadron Leader Frederick Arthur Houghton.
- Acting Squadron Leader William Samuel Oliver Randle AFC DFM.
- Flight Lieutenant Leonard George Edward Ambler.
- Flight Lieutenant John Ivan Roy Bowring.
- Flight Lieutenant Charles Alfred Brown.
- Flight Lieutenant Gordon Wallace Cornock.
- Fight Lieutenant Denis Stanley Fowler.
- Flight Lieutenant Harold Hill DFM.
- Flight Lieutenant Wdlliam Andrew Jeffery.
- Flight Lieutenant Harry Jones.
- Flight Lieutenant William Jopling BEM.
- Flight Lieutenant Sydney Bertram Law.
- Flight Officer Marian Mowat, Women's Royal Auxiliary Air Force.
- Flight Lieutenant Harold Parr Williams DFC.
- Flight Lieutenant Donald Arthur Sydney Woodbridge.
- Acting Flight Lieutenant Charles Baden Annett Brown, RAFVR.
- Acting Flight Lieutenant Horace George Withey.
- Flying Officer Reginald Leonard Macklin.
- Warrant Officer Spencer River Henry Bailey.
- Warrant Officer John Arthur Barnes.
- Warrant Officer Richard Stevenson Beattie.
- Warrant Officer John Fuller Laycock Callaway.
- Warrant Officer Thomas Carr George.
- Warrant Officer John Edward Haden.
- Warrant Officer Charles Edward Hoad.
- Warrant Officer Edward William Randall.
- Warrant Officer Wilfred George Rossiter.
- Acting Warrant Officer Denis Albert Gourd.

Others

- Honorary Assistant Superintendent Harry Pipe, Swaziland Police Force.
- Lieutenant Owen Harcourt Pike Stephenson, Jamaica Battalion.

In recognition of bomb and mine disposal service.

- Mr. George Campbell Foster DSC, Senior Commissioned Gunner (T), Royal Navy.

=== Order of the British Empire (Military Division), Korea ===
In recognition of non-operational services in Japan in connection with operations in Korea

==== Officers ====
Royal Navy

- Acting Lieutenant-Commander (S) Robert James Bell Finlay MBE.

Army

- Major (Temporary) James Richard Head, Royal Army Ordnance Corps.

Royal Air Force

- Wing Commander Dudley Henderson Burnside DSO DFC.

==== Members ====
- Major (Temporary) Peter John Scott Stokes, The King's Royal Rifle Corps.
- Warrant Officer Class I (Local) Alfred Thomas, Coldstream Guards.

=== Order of The British Empire (Civil Division) ===
==== Dames Commander ====
- Marjorie Maxse CBE, Vice-Chairman of the Conservative Party, 1944–1950. For political and public services.

==== Knights Commander ====
- Sir Robert Abraham Burrows, Chairman of Directors, Remploy Ltd. For services to the Disabled.
- Charles Craik Cunningham CB CVO, Secretary, Scottish Home Department.
- Lewis Bede Hutchinson CB, Deputy Secretary, Ministry of Supply.
- William Stuart Murrie CB, Deputy Under-Secretary of State, Home Office.
- The Right Honourable Horace Marton, Baron Terrington CBE, Chairman, National Arbitration Tribunal.
- Lieutenant-Colonel Mervyn James Wheatley CBE, Member for East Dorset, 1945–1950, and for Poole, 1950–1951. For political and public services.
- Sir Wynn Powell Wheldon DSO , lately Chairman, Welsh Committee of the Festival of Britain.

==== Commanders ====
- William Eric Adams OBE, General Manager, Harlow New Town Development Corporation.
- Brigadier Philip Reginald Antrobus MC (Retd), Assistant Secretary, German Section, Foreign Office.
- Henry Arnold, Chief Executive (Purchasing Manager), Pilkington Brothers Ltd., Liverpool. For services to the salvage drive.
- Benjamin Edward Astbury OBE, General Secretary, Family Welfare Association.
- George Leo Bailey, Director of Research, British Non-Ferrous Metals Research Association.
- Bertie Thomas Percival Barker, Emeritus Professor of Agricultural Biology, University of Bristol.
- Joseph Leslie Bartlett MINA, Deputy Director of Naval Construction, Admiralty.
- John Livingstone Baynes, Managing Director, Gabriel, Wade & English Ltd., lately Chairman, Softwood Decontrol Committee, Timber Trades Federation of the United Kingdom.
- Abraham Francis Bennett MIEE, Director and Joint General Manager, Automatic Telephone & Electric Company Ltd.
- John Phillip Berkin, Manager, Shell Petroleum Company Ltd.
- John Richard Bickersteth JP, Chairman, East Sussex Agricultural Executive Committee.
- Thomas Francis Anthony Board, Director, Distillers Company Ltd.
- George McDonald Bottome FCA. For political services.
- Robert Boutflour, Principal, Royal Agricultural College, Cirencester.
- Robert Dyson Briercliffe JP, Alderman, Anglesey County Council.
- Edward Humphrey Browne, Chief Mining Engineer and Director-General of Production, National Coal Board.
- Elliott Martin Browne, Director of the British Drama League; producer for the Festival at York.
- Arthur Ernest Dixon Burdett, Managing Director, Fuller's Ltd., Hammersmith; vice-Chairman, Caterers Association.
- Herbert Henry Burton, Director, English Steel Corporation Ltd.
- Charles Cameron , Professor of Tuberculosis, University of Edinburgh.
- Stanley John Campling OBE, Assistant Secretary, Board of Trade.
- Agnes Catnach, Headmistress, Putney County School.
- Frank Gordon Challis FRICS, Assistant Chief Valuer, Board of Inland Revenue.
- Kathleen Chambers JP, Member, Ministry of Health Advisory Council for the Welfare of Handicapped Persons.
- Colonel James Bertram Coates OBE MC DL, Secretary, East Lancashire Territorial and Auxiliary Forces Association.
- Joseph Compton, Chairman of the Poetry Panel and of the 1951 Committee of the Arts Council of Great Britain. For services to the Festival of Britain.
- Roland Cecil Cooke, lately Director of Exhibitions, Festival of Britain office.
- John Macqueen Cowan, Assistant to the Regius Keeper, Royal Botanic Garden Edinburgh.
- Ian Herbert Cox, lately Director of Science, Festival of Britain Office.
- George Frederick Dakin MC, HM Inspector of Schools (Divisional Inspector), Ministry of Education.
- William Deane, Assistant Secretary, Air Ministry.
- Victor Percival Augustine Derrick, Chief Statistician, General Register Office.
- Milton Victor Ely, Member of the Board of Governors, King's College Hospital.
- Arundell James Kennedy Esdaile, For services to librarianship and to bibliography.
- Thomas Robinson Ferens. For political and public services in Hull.
- Bertram Atkin Forster, Deputy Director (Purchases), Sugar Division, Ministry of Food.
- Ralph Freeman MBE MICE, lately Consulting Civil Engineer, South Bank Exhibition.
- John Ramsay Gebbie OBE MINA, Managing Director, William Doxford & Sons Ltd., Sunderland.
- Bailie Ian Anderson Johnson-Gilbert JP DL. For political and public services in Edinburgh.
- William Hansford, Assistant Secretary, Scottish Home Department.
- Wilfred Henry Hardman MC, Assistant Secretary, Ministry of Labour and National Service.
- Frederic Staubyn Hartley, Keeper, Science Museum, London .
- Harold Hartley, Chairman, Radiation Ltd.
- Thomas Percy Hilditch FRIC FRS, lately Campbell Brown Professor of Industrial Chemistry, University of Liverpool.
- Henry Wesley Holmes, Regional Food Officer, East and West Ridings Region, Ministry of Food.
- David Glynn Hooper, Assistant Secretary, Ministry of Supply.
- Alderman William Philip Jackson. For political and public services in Manchester.
- William George Jagelman OBE, Establishment Officer, Prison Commission.
- Douglas Marsden-Jones, Manager, Labour Relations Division, Ford Motor Company Ltd.
- Alec Houghton Joyce CIE OBE, Assistant Secretary, Commonwealth Relations Office.
- Thelma Cazalet-Keir, Member for East Islington, 1931–1945. For political and public services.
- Captain Robert Ronald Kippen, Marine Manager, Ellerman Lines Ltd., London.
- Willoughby Lappin, Rolls-Royce Liaison Officer with the Royal Air Force and Government Departments.
- Frederick Measham Lea OBE FRIC, Director, Building Research Station, Department of Scientific & Industrial Research.
- Edward Tangye Lean, Controller, European Services, British Broadcasting Corporation.
- Walter Lewis, lately Printer to the University of Cambridge.
- The Reverend John Howard Litten, lately Principal, National Children's Home & Orphanage, Highbury Park.
- Percy Livsey JP. For political and public services in the home counties.
- Howard Leslie Vicars Lobb FRIBA, lately Chairman, Council for Architecture & Town Planning, Festival of Britain.
- John Gilbert Lockhart OBE, Secretary, United Kingdom Branch, Commonwealth Parliamentary Association.
- Percy Lubbock, Author.
- Frederick Hickman Lucraft, Clerk to the Special Commissioners of Income Tax, Board of Inland Revenue.
- James William McConnnell OBE, Permanent Secretary, Ministry of Labour & National Insurance, Northern Ireland.
- John McNaughton JP, Chairman, Argyll Education Committee.
- Cuthbert Gaulter Magee FRCPE, Deputy Director General of Medical Services, Ministry of Pensions.
- Albert Edward Hefford Masters MIMechE, Chief Scientific Officer, Fighting Vehicles Design Establishment, Ministry of Supply.
- Robert Hogg Matthew ARIBA, Architect to the London County Council. For services to the Festival of Britain.
- George Walker Middleton, General Secretary, Scottish Trades Union Congress.
- Thomas Ridley Wood Burton Miller, Foreign Office.
- Harold Mills OBE, Deputy General Manager, Navy, Army and Air Force Institutes.
- Frank Montgomery, lately Deputy Director of Stores, Admiralty.
- Anna Neagle (Florence Marjorie Wilcox), Film actress.
- Morley Havelock Neale, lately Member, Scientific Fishery Research Committees of The Development Commission.
- Robert Franklin Newman OBE JP, Director and General Manager, Transport Equipment (Thornycroft) Ltd., Basingstoke.
- Harry Oldham, Trade Commissioner (Grade I), Toronto.
- Michael Willcox Perrin OBE, lately Deputy Controller, Atomic Energy Division, Ministry of Supply.
- William Primrose, Viola player.
- Denis Rebbeck MIMechE MINA AMICE JP. lately Deputy Chairman, Northern Ireland Festival Committee.
- Thomas Renfrew MBE, Chief Constable, Lanarkshire Constabulary.
- Norman Denbigh Riley, Keeper of Entomology, British Museum (Natural History).
- Thomas James Robbins, Collector, London Port, Board of Customs & Excise.
- Alderman Evan Roberts JP, Chairman, Denbigh Agricultural Executive Committee.
- Andrew Gordon Robertson MM, Director, Contracts Department, General Post Office.
- Edward Stanley Gotch Robinson FBA, Keeper, Department of Coins and Medals, British Museum.
- Flora McKenzie Robson, Actress.
- John Aime Roney OBE, Member of the Development Areas Advisory Committee.
- Colonel Thomas Eric St. Johnston OBE, Chief Constable of Lancashire.
- George Ronald Sankey JP. For political and public services in the West Midlands.
- Lucile Sayers JP. For political and public services in Devon.
- Bernard Charles Sendall, lately Controller, Festival of Britain Office.
- Herbert Edward Smith OBE. Assistant Secretary, War Office.
- Herbert Lawrence Stevens OBE FRAeS MIMechE, Principal Director of Equipment, Research & Development (Air), Ministry of Supply.
- Captain John Carrington Taylor, Professional Officer, Ministry of Transport.
- Charles Douglas Smith Tennant, General Secretary, Navigators' and Engineer Officers' Union.
- Leslie Alfred Terry, Director, City of London College.
- Alfred Henry George Thompson JP, Regional Controller, North West Region, Ministry of National Insurance.
- Charles Wilfrid Tregenza, lately HM Inspector of Schools.
- Cyril Herbert Walker OBE MC FRICS FRIBA, Director of Housing and Valuer, London County Council.
- James Alexander Walker. For public services, including services to the Festival of Britain.
- Alexander George Webb OBE. Director of Employment and Pensions, British Legion.
- Brigadier Ralph Pung Wheeler FRICS. Deputy Director General and Director of Field Survey, Ordnance Survey Department.
- Thomas Benjamin Wheeler, Chief Education Officer, Middlesex County Council.
- Arthur Whittaker, Director, Cadbury Brothers Ltd., and J.S. Fry & Sons Ltd.
- Reginald Alfred Whittle, MC, Assistant Secretary, Colonial Office.
- James Elliott Wilson, Chairman and Trustee, Ulster Volunteer Force Hospitals, Northern Ireland.
- John Wilson JP, General Manager and Secretary, Clyde Navigation Trust.
- Thomas Henry Windibank MIEE, Director, Crompton Parkinson Ltd.
- Arthur Winstanley MBE , Deputy Chief Inspector of Mines for Special Development Duties, Ministry of Fuel & Power.
- William Wallace Withers, Member of the Council, Royal Air Force Benevolent Fund.

==== Officers ====
- Jack Edward Abbott, Principal, HM Treasury.
- James Weierter Renwick Adams, County Planning Officer, Kent County Council.
- Lieutenant-Colonel Frank William Allbones MBE, Chief Recruiting Officer, Northern Command, York, War Office.
- Lieutenant-Colonel Henry Irving Rodney Allfrey DSO MC, County Director, Somerset Branch, British Red Cross Society.
- Oliver Lumsden Armstrong, lately Higher Collector, Edinburgh, Board of Customs & Excise.
- William Powrie Lang Arnott MBE, Deputy Chief Administrative Officer, French District, Imperial War Graves Commission.
- Alfred Victor Baker MBE, Principal, Ministry of Transport.
- William Thomas Baker JP, Retail Meat Trade Adviser for England and Wales, Ministry of Food.
- John Macdonald Bannerman, President, An Comunn Gàidhealach for services to the Festival of Britain.
- John Barber, Head of London Licensing Office, Ministry of Works.
- Evelyn Elizabeth Patricia Bark, International Relations Adviser to the British Red Cross Society.
- Alderman Horace Barks JP, lately Chairman, Festival of Britain Committee, Stoke-on-Trent.
- Frederick Barry, Principal Officer, Ministry of Commerce, Northern Ireland.
- Alderman David Beevers, lately Chairman, Festival of Britain Committee, Leeds.
- Reginald George Berry, Town Clerk, Battersea for services to the Festival of Britain.
- Paul Edward Bewshea MM, Sales Manager, North America, British Overseas Airways Corporation.
- William Alfred Boddy, Assistant Controller, Savings Department, General Post Office.
- Alastair Charles Borthwick, lately Organiser for Scotland, Festival of Britain Office.
- Alexander Wilson Braes JP, Provost of Clydebank.
- Lilian Brake JP, Headmistress, Ashford School, Kent.
- Alderman David Bryce JP. For public services in West Sussex.
- Harry Scott Butterworth, Chairman, Royton & Shaw Employment Committee.
- James Maxwell Adams Cameron, Head of Premises and Stores, British Broadcasting Corporation.
- Thomas Edward Cammell, Assistant Regional Controller, Midlands Region, Ministry of National Insurance.
- Frederick Charles Carter MIEE, Staff Engineer, Post Office Engineering Department.
- Harry Graham Carter, Head of Typographic Design and Layout Section, HM Stationery Office.
- Reginald Oliver Chapman, District Postmaster, Western District of London, General Post Office.
- George Hulbert Chettle FSA , Inspector of Ancient Monuments, Ministry of Works.
- John Douglas Chilton. For political and public services in Darlington.
- Thomas Gregg Christie MIMechE MIEE, Chief Engineer, Northern Ireland Electricity Board.
- Irene Josephine Churchill, DPhil FSA, Assistant Librarian, Lambeth Palace.
- Leslie Ebenezer Clark MBE, Foreign Office.
- Thomas Ernest Bennett Clarke, Screenwriter, Ealing Studios Ltd.
- Alderman Howard Coltman JP, Deputy Chairman, Leicestershire Agricultural Executive Committee.
- Stanley Carlyle Colvill, Principal Finance Officer, Ministry of Education.
- William Conor, Painter.
- John Robertson Coupar, Chairman, Guild of Agricultural Journalists.
- Colonel Alexander John Cruickshank DSO, lately Secretary, Territorial and Auxiliary Forces Association of the county of Sussex.
- Ian Scott Dalgleish JP. For public services in Woking and district.
- Kathleen Emily Davies JP. For political and public services in Wales.
- Captain Robert Davis MBE JP, Marine Superintendent, Eastern Region, Railway Executive.
- Algernon George Conrad Deuber, Trade Commissioner (Grade II), Cape Town, Board of Trade.
- David Dickson MBE, Chief Executive Officer, Ministry of Transport.
- Alderman William Dobinson JP. For public services in Cumberland.
- John Drabble, Editor, Board of Trade Journal.
- Edwin Drew, Registrar, University College, Swansea.
- Ernest Gerald Sutherland Elliot, Senior Planning Officer, Ministry of Housing and Local Government.
- Harold William Etkins, Head of Branch, Ministry of National Insurance.
- Alderman Elsie May Farley JP, Chairman, Smethwick Executive Council.
- Donald Charles Farquharson MRCS LRCP, Regional Medical Officer, Ministry of National Insurance.
- James Alexander Faulkner, Vice-President, Belfast Savings Council.
- William Robert Fell, Regional Director for East Anglia, Arts Council of Great Britain. For services to the Festival of Britain.
- Ruth Sylvia, Lady Fermoy, lately Chairman, King's Lynn Arts Festival Society.
- Gilbert Barham Findlay, Secretary, Baltic Mercantile & Shipping Exchange.
- William James Fitt FRIBA, lately Chief Architect, Display Construction, Festival of Britain Office.
- George Herbert Fletcher MIMechE MIEE, Chairman, Sheffield & Doncaster District Committee, East and West Ridings Regional Board for Industry.
- Francis John Forty MICE, lately Member of the Festival of Britain Council for Architecture, Town Planning & Building Research.
- Alfred Edwin Francis, lately Director of the 1951 Liverpool Festival.
- George Taylor Friend, Sculptor and Engraver.
- Frederick Inkerman Fuzzens MM JP. For public services in Windsor.
- Francis Arthur Gahan, Principal Inspector of Taxes, Board of Inland Revenue.
- Gerard Leslie Gandy, Divisional Operations Officer, Ministry of Civil Aviation.
- John McIlrath Gibson , Medical Officer of Health and Chief School Medical Officer, Huddersfield.
- Frank William Gladwin, Deputy Director of Audit, Exchequer and Audit Department.
- Earl Consiby Godwin, Superintendent, Architectural Section, Directorate of Works & Buildings, Air Ministry.
- Albert John Golding AMICE, Superintendent, Royal Ordnance Factory, Leeds.
- Jessie Elise Harwood Gordon, Editor of the Nursing Mirror.
- William Cameron Gordon, Assistant Regional Controller, North Eastern Region, Ministry of Labour & National Service.
- Thomas Graham, Vice-Chairman, Building Materials Committee, Scottish Council (Development & Industry).
- Robert Cecil Grant, Constructor, HM Dockyard, Devonport.
- John Guild, Senior Principal Scientific Officer, National Physical Laboratory.
- Hugh Hamill Hagan, Shipbuilding Director, Lobnitz & Company Ltd., Slip Dock, Renfrew.
- Major Harold Wesley Hall MC. For services to the British Museum (Natural History).
- Charles Elton Halliley. For political services.
- Alfred Ernest Halunan MC MRCS LRCP, Regional Medical Officer, Ministry of Health.
- Richmond Rudolph Hawkins Hammond MBE JP, lately Chairman, Festival of Britain Committee, Southampton.
- Frederick Hanley, University Reader in the Faculty of Agriculture, University of Cambridge.
- The Reverend Andrew Drummond Harcus, Vice-Chairman of the Festival of Britain Advisory Committee of Christian Churches.
- Doreen Georgette Harris MBE, Head of Homes & Gardens Department, Women's Voluntary Services.
- Alexander Hart. For political and public services in Dunbartonshire.
- Alderman Mary Ann Hart JP. For public services in Newport, Monmouthshire.
- Henry Harvey, Principal, Air Ministry.
- Jessie Jacquetta Hawkes FSA, lately Specialist Adviser in Archaeology to the Festival of Britain Office.
- William Octavus Hayburn, Chief Executive Officer, Department of Health for Scotland.
- Samuel Hays, Statistician, Ministry of Supply.
- Walter Hodsill Gordon Heath, Deputy Assistant Director, Ministry of Defence.
- Walter Henderson, Chairman, Board of Management, Glasgow Royal Infirmary Group of Hospitals.
- Frank Heppenstall, Secretary, British Wool Federation, Bradford.
- Harold Hewitt JP, General Secretary, National Society of Pottery Workers.
- Bernard Ashley Hill, Civil Assistant, War Office.
- Joseph David Hiscock, Assistant General Secretary, Union of Shop, Distributive & Allied Workers.
- Joseph Lionel Hodgkinson, Regional Director for the North Western Counties, Arts Council of Great Britain. For services to the Festival of Britain.
- Captain Anthony Hodgson MC, Principal, Ministry of Agriculture & Fisheries.
- William Hodkinson, Chief Technical and Planning Officer, North-Western Gas Board.
- James Sylvester Holland, lately Head of Design Branch, Festival of Britain Office.
- George Henry Hornby, Chairman, Food Control Committee, Southend-on-Sea.
- Graham Joseph Horsman, Assistant Director of Navy Contracts, Admiralty.
- Wilfred George Howard, Principal Clerk, Board of Inland Revenue.
- Elizabeth Ann Howarth, Principal, Bolton Women's Institute.
- Colonel Frederick Richard William Hunt TD, Chief Technical Adviser, Vickers-Armstrongs Ltd., London.
- Ernest Ingham, lately Director of the Festival of Britain publicity campaign.
- Robert James MIMechE, Principal, Glamorgan Technical College, Treforest.
- Robert Trafford James MICE, lately Consulting Engineer, South Bank Exhibition.
- Stanley Jennings, lately Chairman, Festival of Britain Committee, Canterbury.
- Alfred John Johnston, Assistant to the Master in Lunacy, Supreme Court of Judicature.
- Alexander Johnstone MBE, Member, National Savings Assembly, representing North Cumberland.
- Edward Watson Jones, Member, Agricultural Land Commission.
- Mary Elizabeth Judd, Secretary to the Conservative Chief Whip in the House of Commons, 1945–1951. For political services.
- Herbert Kelham, Chairman, Stamford Local Employment Committee.
- Henry Birkmyre Kerr MC JP, Managing Director, James Carmichael (Contractors) Ltd., London.
- Richard Owens Kewley, lately Waterguard Inspector, Board of Customs & Excise.
- Charles Wallis Carrington King MVO, Secretary of the Royal Tournament.
- William Henry George Lake, Works Manager, Imperial Chemical Industries Ltd., King's Norton, Warwickshire.
- Frank Horace Lansbury, Secretary, Cable & Wireless Ltd.
- Lieutenant-Colonel William Law MC MICE, City Surveyor, Rochester Corporation.
- William John Lawton, Governor, HM Prison, Wandsworth.
- Alderman Kennedy Leacock JP. For public services in Belfast.
- James Allan Lawrence Leask, Vice-Chairman, Midland Regional Board for Industry.
- Quertier Le Pelley, Lieutenant-Bailiff of Guernsey. For public services in Guernsey.
- Richard Levin, lately Designer for the Festival of Britain and Travelling Exhibition.
- Reginald William Lewis, County Welfare Officer for Nottinghamshire.
- Jane Hester Lidderdale, Principal, Office of The Lord President of The Council.
- Stella May Looker. For political and public services in Sussex.
- Robert Arthur Lovell AMIMechE, Senior Engineer, Ministry of Transport.
- James Edward McDonnell, Principal Ministry of Pensions.
- James Dwyer McGee , Head of Photo-Electric Research Section, Electric & Musical Industries Ltd., Hayes, Middlesex.
- Allister McInnes, Chief Constable, City of Perth Police Force.
- Malcolm McKenzie, Chairman, Govan Local Employment Committee.
- Bailie Thomas Kerr MacKenzie. For political and public services in Lanarkshire.
- Roderick Donald McLeod, Contract Manager, Holland, Hannen & Cubitts Ltd. For services to the Festival of Britain.
- Jean Isalen Marindin, Secretary, Standing Conference of National Voluntary Youth Organisations. For services to the Festival of Britain.
- Hereward Keith Martin, Chief Accountant, Festival of Britain Office.
- James Martin MICE, Fleet Civil Engineer, Admiralty, Malta.
- Wray Maude. For services as Head of Spanish Mission, Ministry of Food.
- William Alexander Milne . For public and medical services in Greenock.
- Donald Ewart Milner, Principal, West of England College of Art, Bristol.
- Edward William Moriarty, Principal, Ministry of Labour and National Service.
- Lieutenant-Colonel Sir Christopher Norman Musgrave Bt, Chief Scout Commissioner for Northern Ireland.
- Alfred Arthur Edmund Newth , Senior School Medical Officer, City of Nottingham.
- Thomas Holme Nicholson. For political and public services in Barnet.
- William Addison Nicholson, lately Member of the Publicity Panel, Scottish Committee of the Festival of Britain.
- Michael Patrick O'Hara, General Manager, Festival Gardens Ltd.
- George Ernest Oswick, London Sales Director, Reed & Smith Ltd., Member, Paper Industry Standards Committee.
- William Douglas Outram, Chief Officer, Hull Fire Brigade.
- Alderman George Owen, Chairman, Stafford and Stone War Pensions Committee.
- Mair Owen, Acting Director in Wales for the Arts Council of Great Britain. For services to the Festival of Britain.
- Montague Russell Page, lately Landscape Architect for Festival Gardens Ltd.
- Charles Francis Pagnamenta, lately Head of Prices Department, British Iron & Steel Federation.
- Robert Frederick Seymour Pattenden AMIMechE, Principal Lecturer, Military College of Science, War Office.
- Henry Richard Payne, Head of Safety Organisation, Imperial Chemical Industries Ltd., London.
- Charles Pearce JP. For political and public services in London.
- Edward William Cowpe-Pendleton BEM, Chief Constable, Coventry City Police Force.
- Arthur Edward Scott-Piggott, lately Deputy General Manager, South Bank Exhibition, Festival of Britain Office.
- Edith Maud Pitt. For political and public services in Birmingham.
- John Harold Polfrey, lately Catering Manager, Festival of Britain Office.
- George Frederick Porthouse, Principal, Department of Agriculture for Scotland.
- Thomas Prendergast, Assistant Regional Controller, North Western Region, Ministry of Labour and National Service.
- Henry Percy Ralph MC, Deputy Commander, Metropolitan Police.
- Hugh Robert Ralph, Treasurer, Harrow Urban District Council.
- John Ramage, Director, Association of Retail Chambers of Trade.
- Frank Oswald Randall, Director, Goeland Transport & Trading Company Ltd.
- John Clifford Ratcliff ARIBA, lately Assistant Director, Architecture Department, Festival of Britain Office.
- Evan Rees, Chairman, Battersea Local Employment Committee.
- William Herbert Reynolds MC, Headmaster, King's Norton Grammar School for Boys, Birmingham.
- Albert Victor Robertson ARIBA, Principal Regional Architect, Newcastle, Ministry of Housing & Local Government.
- William Alexander Rogerson MC MICE, County Surveyor, Holland County Council.
- Robert Thatcher Rolfe FRIC, Chief Metallurgist, W.H. Allen, Sons & Company Ltd., Bedford.
- Alderman George Henry Routledge JP, Mayor of Carlisle. For services to the Festival of Britain.
- Frederick George Rouvray, Secretary, Hospitals for Diseases of the Chest, London.
- William Arden Royle MIMechE MIEE, Chief Commercial Officer, North Eastern Electricity Board.
- Donald George Shefford Russell, Director, Lygon Arms Ltd., Broadway, Worcestershire.
- William Clayton Russon MBE, Member, National Savings Assembly, representing Merionethshire.
- Arthur Sykes Rymer JP, lately Chairman of York Festival Society.
- Albert Harold Searl MC, lately Director of Non-Ferrous Metals, Ministry of Materials.
- Henry Jesse Sexton, Chairman and Founder, H.J. Sexton Norwich Arts Trust.
- George Wright Simpson , Medical Officer and Chief Inspector of Physical Education, Scottish Education Department.
- William Louis Sims MIMechE , Director, Wadkins Ltd., Leicester.
- Arnold Cecil Smith, Chief Executive Officer, National Assistance Board.
- Percy Charles Smith, Senior Inspector of Taxes, Board of Inland Revenue.
- Reginald Snook, Chief Regional Manager, Central Land Board and War Damage Commission.
- Emily Maude Spencer MBE, Chairman, Wanstead and Woodford Savings Committee.
- David Kelvin-Stark, Principal, Colonial Office.
- William Stevenson, Chief Engineer Officer, SS Antenor, Alfred Holt & Company.
- Alderman Leila Gibson Stowell JP, Mayor of Ealing.
- James Strachan, Member, Scottish Fuel Efficiency Committee.
- James Alexander Pierson Strachan MIMechE, Procurement Officer, Technical and Engineering, United Kingdom Treasury and Supply Delegation, Washington.
- Edmund Stuart, Deputy Director of Statistics, Ministry of Labour and National Service.
- James Eric Watt Sutherland, Assistant Director of Eggs Division, Ministry of Food.
- Cyril Rupert Osborne Taylor, Principal, Ministry of Pensions.
- Captain James Peter Thomson , lately Marine Superintendent, Eagle Oil & Shipping Company Ltd., London.
- Arthur Ernest Tiffin, Assistant General Secretary, Transport & General Workers' Union.
- Bernard Stephen Townroe JP DL. For political and public services.
- Ralph Sydney Tubbs ARIBA, lately co-ordinating Architect for the Festival of Britain.
- Albert Turner, Deputy Regional Controller, North Western Region, Board of Trade.
- Commander Philip Edward Vaux DSC, Royal Navy (Retd), lately Chief Inspector of Lifeboats, Royal National Lifeboat Institution.
- Eric James Waggott, Town Clerk, West Hartlepool.
- Colonel Claude Errington Wales MC JP, Marketing Director, North-Eastern Division, National Coal Board.
- George William Wallis MBE Principal, Air Ministry.
- Edward Joseph Wass, Controller, Valuation Branch, Board of Customs & Excise.
- Captain Charles Henry Watson, Trinity House Sea Pilot, Isle of Wight and Southampton Pilotage District.
- James Waiters, Shipbuilding Manager and Local Director, Cammell Laird & Company Ltd., Birkenhead.
- Huw Pyrs Wheldon MC, lately Representative of the Arts Council of Great Britain on the Festival of Britain Executive Committee.
- Seymour Whinyates, Director, Music Department, British Council.
- John William Whiter, Director of Richard Costain Ltd. For services to the Festival of Britain.
- Joseph Percy Willcock, Director of Supply & Transport, Home Office.
- Major Arthur Ivor Wynne-Williams MC (Retd), Consultant Engineer to the Head of United Kingdom Ministry of Supply Staff, Australia.
- John William Williams, Chairman, Wrexham Local Employment Committee.
- William Martin Williams MC, Land Commissioner, Ministry of Agriculture & Fisheries.
- Ronald Paterson Shaw Wilson, Chief Constable of West Sussex.
- Paul Herve Giraud Wright, lately Director of Public Relations, Festival of Britain Office.
- Hearsey Keith Ziegler, Grade 1 Assistant, Foreign Office.

==== Members ====
- Dora Mary Abraham, Welfare Worker, Admiralty, Malta.
- Vera Mary Alston, Higher Executive Officer, Ministry of Pensions.
- Margaret Archer, Welfare Officer, United Kingdom High Commission, New Delhi, Commonwealth Relations Office.
- Alfred Armentiere Kemmel Arnold, Secretary Controller, Festival of Britain Committee, Northern Ireland.
- Joseph William James Ashton, Deputy Director, Coffee Division, Ministry of Food.
- Benjamin Aspinall, Headmaster, Emmanuel Church of England Primary School, Blackburn, Lancashire.
- John Campbell Atherley , Admiralty Surgeon and Agent, Manchester.
- Hugh Ernest Victor Austen, Higher Executive Officer, Ministry of Transport.
- William Austin, Superintendent of Royal Parks, Ministry of Works.
- Edward Louis Back, Honorary Secretary, Thorney, Peterborough, Savings Committee.
- Maurice Back, Higher Executive Officer, War Office
- Alfred Ernest Baines, lately Chairman, Norwich Festival Society Ltd.
- Harold George Baker, Representative in New York of the Officers' (Merchant Navy) Federation.
- Major Jack Baker, District House Coal Officer, London Region.
- George Frederick Ball, Technical Officer, Ministry of Fuel & Power.
- Patricia Julia Stewart-Ball, lately Women's Voluntary Services Liaison Officer, Festival of Britain Office.
- The Reverend John Angles Barber, lately Member, Festival of Britain Committee, Trowell, Nottinghamshire.
- Alexander William Barcy, Grade 3 Officer, Ministry of Labour & National Service.
- Cyril Oscar Baverstock, Senior Experimental Officer, Admiralty.
- Leonard George Beaby MSM JP, Secretary, Portsmouth Local Committee, Royal Naval Benevolent Trust.
- Albert William Beach, Higher Executive Officer, University Grants Committee.
- Cecil Walter Claude Bean, Acting Assistant Engineer Inspector, Admiralty.
- Amy Florence Beaumont, Senior Executive Officer, Ministry of National Insurance.
- Cyril Beckworth, Senior Executive Officer, Welsh Board of Health.
- Vera Benbow, Chief Officer, Girls' Nautical Training Corps.
- Douglas James Bendle FRICS, Chairman, Gloucestershire, Somerset and North Wiltshire Branch, Royal Institution of Chartered Surveyors.
- Stanley Thomas William Benns, Senior Executive Officer, Ministry of Transport.
- Henry Nicholas Best, Clerk, Chanctonbury Rural District Council.
- James William Edward Betts, Concessions Manager Festival Gardens Ltd.
- Alfred Dixon Biles, Higher Executive Officer, Ministry of National Insurance.
- James MacDonald Birse, Housing Inspector, Department of Health for Scotland.
- William Galliford Blight, Secretary, Birmingham and District Association of Master Bakers, Confectioners & Caterers.
- Frederick Richard Bones, Member, Sittingbourne Local Employment Committee.
- John Percival Bown, Commissioner, Eastern Region, National Savings Committee.
- Herbert Bradley, Station Engineer, North Thames Gas Board.
- Herbert Bradley, Assistant Engineer, South Durham Steel & Iron Company Ltd., Middlesbrough.
- Eric Bradshaw MIEE, Senior Lecturer, College of Technology, Manchester.
- Henry Bramhall MM, Section Operating Manager, Winnington Works, Imperial Chemical Industries Ltd.
- Alfred William George Bristow, lately Superintendent, Higher Grade, London Postal Region, General Post Office.
- Albert Brown, Chief Cashier, British European Airways.
- William Sydney Brown, Head of Branch, Registry of Friendly Societies.
- Algernon Dudley Hooper Browning, District Officer, HM Coastguard, Ministry of Transport.
- Charles Connor Brownlie, Scottish Regional Secretary, National Federation of Building Trades Operatives.
- Ethel May Bull, Chief Clerk, Lichfield Diocesan Board of Finance, and Accountant, Lichfield Diocesan Trust.
- Harold Frank Burgess, Secretary, National Institute for Research in Dairying.
- James Symington Burns, Regional Prospecting Officer, Scotland, Ministry of Fuel & Power.
- Maureen Jane Burton, Higher Executive Officer, Foreign Office (Administration of African Territories).
- Charles George Bush, Training Service Officer, Grade I, Ministry of Labour & National Service.
- Dorothy Mabel Bush, Higher Clerical Officer, Admiralty.
- Joyce Butt, Honorary Secretary, Sailors', Soldiers' & Airmen's Families Association, Colchester.
- Henry Joseph Callender, lately Member, Organising Council of the Staffordshire Festival of Music & Drama.
- Thomas Tetlow Callison, Chief Production Design Engineer, Bonar Long & Company Ltd., Dundee.
- Grigor John Cameron, Head Forester, Buccleuch Estates, Bowhill, Selkirk.
- Isabella Jeannie Cameron, Matron, Craigmoray Institution, Elgin.
- Phyllis Hodgson Campbell, Matron, Victoria Cottage Hospital, Maryport, Cumberland.
- Percy George Campling MIMechE MIEE, Manager, Chilterns Sub-Area, Eastern Electricity Board.
- John Archibald Carter, Higher Executive Officer, Ministry of Housing & Local Government.
- Leslie Ernest Carter, Senior Assistant, Gray, Dawes & Company Ltd., London.
- Francis John Chard, Production Manager (Brabazon Project), Bristol Aeroplane Company Ltd.
- Haldane Charters, Senior Executive Officer, Forestry Commission.
- Alfred Charles Chilman, Senior Executive Officer, Ministry of National Insurance.
- Joan Alice Clark, Executive Officer, lately Foreign Office (now Ministry of Defence).
- Mary Annand Clark, lately Head Clerk, North of Scotland College of Agriculture, Aberdeen.
- Frederick Ernest Cleary FRICS, lately Member, Festival Sub-Committee, Hornsey Borough Council.
- Lieutenant-Commander John Patrick Thomas Coakley RNR, General Secretary, Thames Passenger Service Owners' Association. For services to the Festival of Britain.
- Anne May Coleman, Higher Executive Officer, Ministry of Civil Aviation.
- Francis Alfred Coles, Senior Executive Officer, Office of HM Procurator-General and Treasury Solicitor.
- Percy William Colley AMIMechE, Chief Designer, Birmingham & Midland Motor Omnibus Company Ltd.
- Thomas William Collins, Slaughterhouse Manager, Leicester, Ministry of Food.
- Leonard Walter Collison, Technical Officer, National Institute for Medical Research.
- John Cecil Congdon, Manager, Southampton Employment Exchange, Ministry of Labour & National Service.
- Jean Cooper, Clerical Officer, Festival of Britain Office.
- James Coutts, Superintendent and Deputy Chief Constable, Perthshire and Kinross-shire Constabulary.
- George Croft JP, Chairman, Angus & District War Pensions Committee.
- Charles William Croxon, Senior Experimental Officer, Department of Scientific & Industrial Research.
- John Culley DCM, lately Festival of Britain Organiser, Nottingham.
- Henry John Curlis, Area Organiser in Northern Ireland, National Union of General & Municipal Workers.
- Adelaide Gertrude Curry. For political and public services in Consett and district.
- Agnes Curry, Chairman, Women's Sub-Committee, South Shields Local Employment Committee.
- Alderman Horace Cutts JP. For public services in the West Riding of Yorkshire.
- Frank Herbert Dabbs, Registrar of Births & Deaths, Enfield, Middlesex.
- Raymond Bailey Darby, Chairman, Croydon Savings Committee.
- Captain David Richard Davies, Master, Colonial Development Corporation Motor Vessel Isle of Silhouette.
- Captain David Robert Davies. For political and public services in County Durham.
- Richard Rodney Davies DCM MM, Divisional Road Surveyor, Southern Division, Herefordshire County Council.
- Thomas Davies, lately Festival of Britain Organiser, Cardiff.
- William Davies, Radio Officer, SS Tynwald, Isle of Man Steam Packet Company.
- Margaret Ramage Dawson JP, County Organiser, Kinross-Shire, Women's Voluntary Services.
- George Frederick Deane, Staff Officer, Board of Inland Revenue.
- Marjorie Lilian Dence, Founder and Manager, Perth Repertory Theatre for Services to the Festival of Britain.
- James Denver, Secretary, Manchester, Salford & District Building Trades Employers' Association.
- Reginald Diamond, Chief Engineer Officer, MV Pacific Coast, Coast Lines Ltd.
- William Ronald Dickens, lately Designer for the Festival of Britain.
- Philip Shepley Wilson-Dickson, Instructor-Secretary, Fire Service College, Dorking, Surrey.
- Mabel Margaret Doig, Principal Sister Tutor, Norfolk & Norwich Hospital.
- Stanley Wilson Dove, Export Manager, Scott & Turner Ltd., Newcastle upon Tyne.
- Herbert John Dowden, General Manager, Fabrics, Print & Weaving Plant, A. Sanderson & Sons Ltd., Uxbridge.
- John Sutherland Duncan, Honorary Secretary, Wick, Caithness-shire, Lifeboat Station.
- James Dunlop, Area Education and Training Officer, Scottish Division, National Coal Board.
- Harry Dunn, Senior Information Officer, Central Office of Information.
- Joseph Leslie Dunn, Chief Superintendent, West Riding Constabulary.
- Lionel Arlingham Hurst Dunn MM, Personnel Manager, Whitehead Iron & Steel Company Ltd., Newport, Monmouthshire.
- Elizabeth Robertson Weir Dunsmore, Senior Assistant, Animal Products Division, Colonial Development Corporation.
- Lieutenant-Colonel Thomas Gwynne Ellis FRICS, lately County Land Agent to the Norfolk County Council.
- Elias Joe Emden. For political and public services in London.
- Tom Emmott, lately Temporary Senior Executive Officer, Board of Trade.
- Clive Bindley Erlebach, Secretary, Trustee Savings Banks Inspection Committee.
- Annie Elizabeth Etty, Headmistress, Risley Avenue Secondary Modern Girls' School, Tottenham.
- Alderman Anne Fisher JP, lately Chairman, Caernarvonshire County Council.
- Frederick Lionel Fisher, Chairman, Newport, Monmouthshire, Rotary Club.
- William Charles Fisher, Higher Executive Officer, War Office.
- James Knox Forbes , Headmaster, County Intermediate School, Coleraine.
- Joseph William Ford, Office Manager, Central Scottish Motor Transport Company Ltd., Motherwell.
- Frank Fortt, Traffic Manager, Rhondda Transport Company.
- Alexander Fowler JP, Further Education Officer, Ross & Cromarty Education Authority.
- Thomas Alexander Fraser, Staff Officer (Manual Workers), London Electricity Board.
- Muriel Josephine Louise Frazer MRCP FRCSI, District Surgeon, St. John Ambulance Brigade, Northern Ireland District.
- Edmund Arthur Freeman, Senior Executive Officer, Festival of Britain Office.
- Harold Wilfrid Freeman, Executive Officer, Board of Customs & Excise.
- Leonard Gideon French, Manager, Kidderminster Employment Exchange, Ministry of Labour & National Service.
- William Frewer, Temporary Assistant, Board of Trade.
- Thomas George Alfred Game, Senior Executive Officer, Ministry of Civil Aviation.
- Margaret Lindsay Gammack, Clerical Officer, Ministry of Education.
- Arthur John Garratt, lately Staff Scientist, Festival of Britain Office.
- Charles Giddings MM, Inspector of Stamping, Board of Inland Revenue.
- Cecil Leslie Gilbert, Senior Executive Officer, Ministry of National Insurance.
- Harry William Girling, Senior Executive Officer, Board of Trade.
- Donald Cargill Glen, Superintendent, Belfast Office, HM Stationery Office.
- Frank Gloak, Officer, London Port, Board of Customs & Excise.
- Ernest Charles Goer, Regional Representative, National Schools Advisory Savings Committee.
- Joseph Goss, Vice-Chairman, Civil Defence Association for Northern Ireland.
- Joseph Alfred George Gravestock. For services to the St. John Ambulance Brigade Movement, London Transport.
- Sicelia Grace Greenfield, Personal Assistant to the Deputy Chairman, Docks & Inland Waterways Executive.
- Phyllis Eleanor Greenland, County Organiser, Herefordshire, Women's Voluntary Services.
- Mona Elizabeth Grey, Secretary Organiser, Royal College of Nursing Committee for Northern Ireland. For services to the Festival of Britain.
- Harold Edward Grubb, Higher Executive Officer, Ministry of Supply.
- Ceridwen Gruffydd, Headmistress, Ponciau County Infants' School, Wrexham, Denbighshire.
- Harold Gurney, Cleansing Superintendent, Tottenham Municipal Borough Council.
- Herbert Haigh, Secretary, Railway Convalescent Homes.
- James Hallam, Honorary General Secretary, School Journey Association of London.
- James Araot Hamilton, Senior Scientific Officer, Marine Aircraft Experimental Establishment, Ministry of Supply, Felixstowe.
- Harold Hammond, Command Secretary, Navy, Army & Air Force Institutes, Eastern Command.
- Ernest Thomas Hampson JP, Councillor, Wigan Rural District Council.
- The Venerable Lawrence Winston Harland, Secretary of the Festival of Britain Advisory Committee on Christian Churches.
- George Harrold, Manager, Oil Tank Cleaning Department, Grayson, Rollo & Clover Docks Ltd., Liverpool.
- John Harwood, Managing Director, Harwood & Sons Ltd., Walsall.
- Charles Jeffrey Hayward, Standards Engineer, British Overseas Airways Corporation.
- William Hayward MM JP, Chairman, Cheltenham & District Local Employment Committee.
- Frank Wilmot Heap, Honorary Secretary, Southport Savings Committee.
- Walter Robert Hedges, Higher Executive Officer, Ministry of Health.
- Charles Robert Helliar, Class I Draughtsman, Ordnance Survey, Ministry of Agriculture & Fisheries.
- Eugenie Elizabeth Henley, lately Welfare Worker for Gurkha Families, Women's Voluntary Services, Ipoh, Malaya.
- Frederick Henri Kay Henrion, lately Display Designer for the Festival of Britain.
- William John Grundy Henry, Manager, Retail Export Office, Liberty & Company Ltd., London.
- Frank George Henson, Air Traffic Control Officer, Grade II, Ministry of Civil Aviation.
- George Clement Heselden, Senior Executive Officer, Civil Service Commission.
- Oliver Hill FRIBA, lately Organiser, Festival Exhibition of Cotswold Crafts, Cirencester.
- Nellie Winifred Hix, Higher Executive Officer, Board of Trade.
- Warwick Claude Holden AMIMechE, Manager, Variable Speed Gear Production Department, Vickers-Armstrongs Ltd., Newcastle upon Tyne.
- Harry James Carleton-Holmes, Chairman, No.432 (Woodbridge) Squadron Committee, Air Training Corps.
- Arthur Holness, Head of Research Department, National Union of Agricultural Workers.
- Alfred Hopkins, Divisional Distributing Engineer, North Staffordshire Division, West Midlands Gas Board.
- Ronald William Hornbrook, Food Executive Officer, Plymouth, Ministry of Food.
- Albert William Horwood, Foreign Office.
- James Howat, Surveyor, Greenock, Board of Customs & Excise.
- William Howard JP. For political and public services in Droylsden and district.
- Alderman Joseph Hoy BEM, lately Chairman, Festival of Britain Committee, Sunderland.
- Douglas Hoyes Hunter, lately Festival of Britain Organiser, Inverness.
- Leslie Pool Ingram . For services as Sub-Divisional Manager, Taunton Sub-Division, South Western Gas Board.
- Kathleen Irving, Chairman, York Executive Savings Committee.
- Olive Jewel Jackson, County Organiser, East Riding of Yorkshirewomen's Voluntary Services.
- Richard Jackson, Chairman, Kingsbridge District Committee of the Devon Agricultural Executive Committee.
- Arthur James JP DL, Honorary Local Fuel Overseer, Pontypool.
- Joseph Arnold James, Chief Sales Superintendent, Telephone Manager's Office, Birmingham.
- George Edward Jenkins, Northern Area Manager, Removals Department, Bradford, Special Traffics (Pickfords) Division, Road Haulage Executive.
- George Ross Johnstone, Honorary Secretary, British Legion (Scotland) Women's Section; Secretary, Earl Haig Fund, East of Scotland Division (Other Ranks Branch).
- Dafydd Jones JP, lately Member, Montgomery Agricultural Executive Committee.
- Elsie Elizabeth Jones, Secretary, Mersey Ship Repairers' Federation, Liverpool.
- Gladys Hughes-Jones, County Organiser, Anglesey, Women's Voluntary Services.
- Captain Griffith Jones, Master, SS Harpalion, J. & C. Harrison Ltd.
- Joseph Jones, Colliery Manager, Northern (Northumberland and Cumberland) Division, National Coal Board.
- John Owen Jones, Secretary, Rural Community Council, Llangefni, Anglesey. For services to the Festival of Britain.
- Alexander Joss JP. For public services in Stirling.
- Horace Joynes JP, Works Manager, Stafford Salt Works, Imperial Chemical Industries Ltd.
- John Kane, Commandant, No.4 District Police Training Centre, Eccleshall, Staffordshire.
- Bronek Katz, lately Designer for the Festival of Britain.
- Sara Kenion. For services as Health Visitor, Marylebone District, London County Council.
- George Ernest Kent, Higher Executive Officer, Ministry of National Insurance.
- Major Leonard Herbert Kent, Principal Scientific Officer, Microbiological Research Department, Ministry of Supply, Porton.
- Hector William Charles King, Chairman, Loughborough Savings Committee.
- Alderman Leavens Marson King, lately Chairman, Festival of Britain Executive Committee, Ripon.
- Leslie John King, Works Manager, Parker Pen Company Ltd., London.
- Ivor Klein, Higher Executive Officer, Ministry of Transport.
- Percy Knight, National Organiser, National Union of Seamen.
- Robert James Lacey, Deputy Armament Stores Officer, Admiralty.
- Dorothy Mary Lake, Senior Executive Officer, General Post Office.
- John Thomas Landen, Higher Executive Officer, National Assistance Board.
- James Arthur Lasbrey, lately Entertainments Manager, Festival Gardens Ltd.
- Job Lee, Manager, Open Top Factory, Metal Box Company Ltd., Neath.
- Laurence Edward Alan Lee, lately Staff Caption Writer, Festival of Britain Office.
- William Edward Lees, President, Federation of Young Farmers' Club for Wales.
- Leslie William Thomas Leete, Divisional Officer, London Fire Brigade.
- Walter Alfred Louis Lenegre JP, Principal, Victoria London County Council Institute.
- Captain Noel Bridgeman Lethbridge, Honorary Secretary, Henley Municipal Borough & Rural District Savings Committee.
- Harold Samuel Frederick Lilley, lately Port Tea Officer, Liverpool, Ministry of Food.
- Henry Charles Arthur Linck, Senior Executive Engineer, Welsh & Border Counties Region, General Post Office.
- Harold Lintott DCM, Senior Executive Officer, Ministry of Works.
- Stanley Harry Lock, Senior Assessor, Board of Trade.
- Blanche Lockwood. For political and public services in Sheffield.
- Thomas Rossiter Lockwood, Higher Executive Officer, Central Land Board & War Damage Commission.
- George Percy Lovell, Higher Clerical Officer, Corporation of Trinity House.
- Robert Murray Lowry. For public services in Belfast.
- Jesse Robert Lucas, Chief Superintendent, City of London Police.
- Elizabeth Alice Luty, County Secretary, City of London Branch, British Red Cross Society.
- Neil McLachlan McCaig, Director and Chief Engineer, Fisher & Ludlow Ltd., Birmingham.
- Dora McCann, Secretary, Liverpool Roll of Honour Fund.
- Patrick Hugh McCann, Inspector of Taxes, Board of Inland Revenue.
- William McDougall, Head Foreman Turner, John Hastie & Company Ltd., Greenock.
- Hilda Sybil Abbott McGill, Executive Officer, Safety in Mines Research Establishment, Ministry of Fuel & Power.
- Alexandrina Chisholm Mackay, Matron, Ministry of Pensions Nursing Service.
- George Louis McKelvey, General Inspector, Ministry of Agriculture, Northern Ireland. For services to the Festival of Britain.
- Andrew McKeown, Staff Officer, Ministry of Health & Local Government, Northern Ireland.
- Margaret Mackinlay. For public services in Larne, County Antrim.
- Cecil Charles Madden, Assistant to Controller, Television Programmes, British Broadcasting Corporation.
- Eric Ainsley Major JP, Secretary, National Association of Parish Councils. For services to the Festival of Britain.
- Herbert Reginald Mallett JP, Chairman, Isle of Ely Youth Employment Committee.
- Denis Keron Malone, Senior Executive Officer, Colonial Office.
- Arthur Norman Mansfield MIEE, No.4 Sub-Area Engineer, Merseyside & North Wales Electricity Board.
- Monteith St. Clair Marshall, Director & General Manager, Marshall Motor Bodies Ltd., Cambridge.
- William Arthur Lewis Marshall, Senior Experimental Officer, Meteorological Office, Air Ministry.
- Lady Anne Holland-Martin JP, Deputy Head of Services, Welfare & Training Department, Women's Voluntary Services.
- Jordon Alfred Martin MC, Chief Surveyor, Cable & Wireless Ltd.
- Joan Adele Masterman, Executive Officer, Ministry of Housing & Local Government.
- Trevor Rees Matthews, Personnel Manager, George Kent Ltd., Resolven, Glamorganshire.
- Robert Matthewson, Chairman, Chester Disablement Advisory Committee.
- Isabella Hamilton Maxwell. For political services in Rutherglen and district.
- Herbert Hirst Michelbacher, Chief Executive Officer, Home Office.
- Samuel Midgley JP, Chairman, Todmorden Disablement Advisory Committee.
- John Edwin Alfred Miles, Higher Executive Officer, Commonwealth Relations Office.
- Captain Kenneth Bamford Millar, Royal Navy (Retd), Superintendent, Royal Courts of Justice, Supreme Court of Judicature.
- Frederick Mills MC JP, Managing Director, Roughead & Park Ltd., Agricultural Seeds Merchants, East Lothian.
- Thomas Milner, Manager, Rolling Mill, Frederick Braby & Company Ltd., Glasgow.
- Charles Owen Mitchell, Divisional Officer, Somerset Fire Brigade.
- Robert Moncrieff, Secretary and Accountant, National Galleries of Scotland.
- Bernard Montague, Deputy Principal Officer, Ministry of Agriculture, Northern Ireland.
- Dorothy Moon. For political services in the Wirral.
- Victor Moore, Senior Executive Officer, War Office.
- Harry Morris, lately Organising Secretary, Festival of Britain, Swansea.
- Margaret Mortimer, Executive Officer, Ministry of Pensions.
- Herbert Frederick Morton MIMechE, Chief Works Engineer, De Havilland Propellers Ltd., Bolton.
- William Henry Mossman JP. For public services in Huntingdonshire.
- William Douglas Mulholland, Building Manager, Richard Costain Ltd. For services to the Festival of Britain.
- Hector Cameron Munro, Superintendent, Orphan Homes of Scotland, Bridge of Weir.
- Gertrude Florence Patricia Murphy, Higher Executive Officer, Board of Trade.
- Alfred Myers JP, Chairman, Otley Local Employment Committee.
- John William Rivington Naden, Chief Metallurgist, Chesterfield Tube Company Ltd.
- Observer Commander William Ainslie Nimmo, Commandant, No. 35 Group, Royal Observer Corps, Oban.
- Percy Nish, Higher Executive Officer, Department of Agriculture for Scotland.
- Harold Owen Norwood, Workshops Manager, Atomic Energy Research Establishment, Ministry of Supply, Harwell.
- Patrick O'Brien, Organiser, Dockers' Section, Cardiff Docks Area, Transport & General Workers' Union.
- John Richard Denis Olver, Staff Officer, Ministry of Commerce, Northern Ireland. For services to the Festival of Britain.
- Margot Osborn, Administrative Assistant, Festival of Britain Office.
- Lloyd Owen, Purchasing Manager, Rowntree & Company Ltd., York.
- Charles Arthur Packer AMIMechE, Principal of the Apprenticeship School of G.& J. Weir Ltd., Glasgow.
- Percival John Parratt, Accountant, Ministry of Fuel & Power.
- Arthur James Parsons, Experimental Test & Research Engineer, Mawdsley Ltd., Dursley, Gloucestershire.
- William Arthur Paterson, Honorary Secretary, East Renfrewshire Savings Committee.
- Robert Paul, Higher Executive Officer, General Post Office, Edinburgh.
- William Henry Peachy, Chairman, South Wiltshire District Committee, South Western Regional Board for Industry.
- Roland James Peake, Senior Executive Officer, Ministry of Materials.
- Florence Edith Pearson for Political Services in South Hammersmith.
- Victor Richard Fiddian Peers, Designer, Simplex Electric Company Ltd., Birmingham.
- Wesley Perrins, Birmingham & West Midlands District Secretary, National Union of General & Municipal Workers.
- Sydney Frank Perry, Manager of Experimental Department, Vickers-Armstrongs Ltd., Winchester.
- Doris Ellen Pett, Clerical Officer, Privy Council Office.
- Marjorie Pink, Steward, HM Borstal Institution, Aylesbury.
- Winifred Elsie Ponter, Matron, St. Martin's Hospital, Bath.
- Edwin Ernest Poole, Staff Officer, Board of Inland Revenue.
- Frank Popple, Agricultural Advisory Officer, Ministry of Agriculture & Fisheries.
- Hugh Pritchard. For political and public services in Flintshire.
- Ewart Pryor, Headmaster, Victoria Road County Primary School, St. Budeaux, Plymouth.
- Honor Mary Pulley, Assistant Secretary, Royal Military Benevolent Fund.
- John Edwin Quain, Member, Leicester & District Local Employment Committee; Secretary, Leicester Branch, British Legion.
- Frank Squire Rae, Higher Executive Officer, Air Ministry.
- John Danson Ralph, lately Representative of the British Film Institute at the Festival of Britain Office.
- George Raynes, Colliery Under-manager, North Eastern Division, National Coal Board.
- Percy Edgar Reeks, Senior Executive Officer, Passport Office.
- Mary Reelly, Honorary Secretary, Street Sayings Group Committee, Belfast.
- Magdalen Mary Edith Louisa Renouf, Foundress and Honorary Warden of Le Platon Home for Incurables, Guernsey.
- Alderman James Wakem Rickeard JP, Chairman, Blyth Rural District Council.
- Alderman Arthur Samuel Rickwood, Member, Isle of Ely Agricultural Executive Committee.
- James Renwick Riddell FCA, Honorary Secretary, No.111 (Shrewsbury) Squadron Committee, Air Training Corps.
- Marion Liddle Ritchie. For political and public services in Leith.
- Captain Rio Ritchie MC, lately Chairman of the West Highland Festival, Duror, Argyllshire.
- John Rhys-Roberts, Chairman, Llangollen International Musical Eisteddfod. For services to the Festival of Britain.
- Agnes Marshall Chalmers Robertson. For services to the Malone Place Hospital, Belfast.
- Arthur James Robinson, Chief Superintendent, Metropolitan Police.
- Margaret Cahoon Rodden. For services as League of Pity Organiser, National Society for The Prevention of Cruelty to Children, Northern Ireland.
- Alun Rogers AMICE, Engineer and Surveyor, Caerphilly Urban District Council.
- Henry Roll, lately Organiser, Bristol Industries Trade Exhibition, Festival of Britain.
- Elizabeth Linklater Stirling Ross, lately Inspector of Special and Residential Schools to the Birmingham Local Education Authority.
- James William Ross, lately Senior Executive Officer, Festival of Britain Office, Glasgow.
- Joseph John Ryan, Site Superintendent, Holland, Hannen & Cubitts Ltd. For services to the Festival of Britain.
- Alderman William Strafford Sanderson. For public services in Morpeth.
- Martin Saunders, District Operating Superintendent, Rugby, Railway Executive.
- Beryl Blanche Selous Collick, Regional Officer, No.6 (Southern) Region, Women's Voluntary Services.
- Ralph Scott, Superintendent, Egham Industrial Rehabilitation Unit, Ministry of Labour & National Service.
- Dorothy Scott Scully, Office Manager, Bacon Importers' National (Defence) Association.
- George Alexander Sexton JP. For political and public services in Willesden.
- Emily Adams Sharp, County Director and Secretary, Lanarkshire Branch, British Red Cross Society.
- Henry Ernest Sharp MIMechE, Chief Technical Engineer and Head of Research Department, J. Thornycroft & Company Ltd., Southampton.
- Robert Edward Graham Shillington, District Inspector, Royal Ulster Constabulary.
- James Sim JP, Area Secretary, Electrical Trades Union, Dundee.
- John Skinner, Works & Production Director, Howard & Bullough Ltd., Accrington.
- Freda Mary Small, Civil Assistant, War Office.
- Florence Ethel Smith. For services as Organising Secretary, Hostels for Crippled & Invalid Women Workers.
- Frank Maurice Wharram Smith, Financial Adviser to the British Army Force in Korea.
- Reginald Gordon Sprules, Senior Executive Officer, No. 35 Maintenance Unit RAF, Lancashire.
- James Startin MM, Organiser, Transport & General Workers' Union.
- William Thomson Steel, Manager, John Lidgett & Sons, London.
- Iris Ethel Stobart, lately Services Leader, Young Women's Christian Association Club, Hong Kong.
- Frank Ernest Stone, Inspector of Mines, Northern Division, Ministry of Fuel & Power.
- Gerard Lewis William Street MC, lately Press Officer, Festival of Britain Office.
- Dorothy Stubbs, Ward Sister, Meanwood Park Hospital, Leeds.
- Lieutenant (S) Frederick James Sutton MSM RN (Retd), Books Officer, Portsmouth Command, Admiralty.
- George Swain, Works Manager, Composite Steel Works, James Neill & Co. (Sheffield) Ltd.
- Edward Thomas William Swaine, lately Exhibition Manager, Festival of Britain Office.
- Noel Frederic Carl Halpin Sweny, District Inspector, Royal Ulster Constabulary.
- Sydney Bryan Taylor, Manager, Government Contracts, English Electric Company Ltd., Bradford.
- Bertram Ernest Thody, Collector of Taxes, Board of Inland Revenue.
- Ada Frances Thomas. For political and public services in Monmouthshire.
- Keith Nikolas Home Thomson, lately Artistic Director, Festival of Britain, York.
- Doris Ruth Thorn, Higher Executive Officer, Ministry of Agriculture & Fisheries.
- Barbara Thrupp, Housing Manager, Mitcham Borough Council.
- James Thynne, Senior Executive Officer, Ministry of National Insurance.
- Charles William Edward Todd, lately Headmaster, Elstead Church of England Primary School, Surrey.
- William Charles Todd, Principal Probation Officer, Middlesex.
- Florence Irene Toovey, Superintendent, Central Typing Service, British Council.
- Phyllis Elsie Tranter, lately Assistant, Festival of Britain Office.
- Doris Trewhitt, Executive Officer, Air Ministry.
- Frank Turner, Higher Executive Officer, Ministry of Transport.
- Thomas William Turner, Clerk of Works, London County Council. For services to the Festival of Britain.
- Rodney Archibald Twitchin, Head of Exports Assistance Department, National Union of Manufacturers.
- Albert Tyler, Chief Sanitary Inspector and Chief Housing Inspector, City of Bath.
- Commander John May Upton RD, RNR (Retd), Chairman, Barnet Disablement Advisory Committee.
- Francis Philip Usborne, Secretary, Yacht Racing Association for services to the Festival of Britain.
- George Browning Vale, Higher Executive Officer, Ministry of Supply.
- Alexander Edward Walker, Actuary, Aberdeen Savings Bank.
- Thomas Walton, Grade 6 Officer, Ministry of Labour & National Service.
- Ellen Mary Warren, Ward Sister, Royal Cornwall Infirmary, Truro.
- Oliver William Warren, Chief Clerk, Engineering Department, Receiver's Office, New Scotland Yard.
- Leslie Watson MM, Senior Clerk, French District, Imperial War Graves Commission.
- Captain Joseph Webber, Master, MV Caledonian Coast, Coast Lines Ltd.
- Frederick Talbot Webster. For political and public services in Stockton-on-Tees.
- Thomas Weir JP, Private Secretary to the Lord Provost of Glasgow.
- Winifred Grace Wells, Controller of Typists, Ministry of Supply.
- Alderman Henry Edwin White JP, Member, Bedfordshire Agricultural Executive Committee.
- Francis Oliver Innes Whitlocke. For political and public services in Hampshire.
- George Adolphus Montagu Wilkinson, lately Organiser for the Festival of Britain, Cheltenham.
- John Drummpnd Willox, Chairman, Roxburghshire Savings Committee.
- Cyril George Edward Winfield, District Engineer, Ministry of Works.
- Clifford William Witterick, Higher Executive Officer, Ministry of Education.
- William Henry Woods, Divisional Officer, North Eastern Area of Scotland Fire Brigade.
- Eric Alfred Worby, lately Management Officer, Festival of Britain Office.
- Ronald William Wordley, Assistant Secretary, Rotary International. For services to the Festival of Britain.
- Sidney Smith Wright, Higher Executive Officer, Ministry of Transport.
- James Angus Young. For political and public services in the west of Scotland.

=== Order of The British Empire (Civil Division) (Overseas) ===
==== Knights Commander ====
- George Leader Bailey CBE Director and General Manager in Greece of Lake Copais Company.

==== Commanders ====
- Alec Cecil Stanley Adams, His Majesty's Charged' Affaires in Korea.
- Philip Nicholas Bianchi, President to the Central Council of Maltese Communities in Egypt.
- Arthur Eric Courtney Drake, lately General Manager in Persia for the Anglo Iranian Oil Company.
- The Right Reverend Daniel Ivor Evans, Lord Bishop in Argentina and Eastern South America with the Falkland Islands.
- Walter Godfrey, Minister (Commercial) at His Majesty's Embassy in Rio de Janeiro.
- Walter Gerald Cloete Graham, lately Counsellor at His Majesty's Embassy in Peking.
- Marie Ferdinand Phillipe Herchenroder, Assistant Solicitor, Control Commission for Germany (British Element).
- Cyril Alexander Edward Lea, Director of Establishments, Finance Department, Sudan Government.
- William Bernard Malley MBE Counsellor at His Majesty's Embassy in Madrid.

==== Officers ====
- Walter Hollis Adams MBE, His Majesty's Consulate, San Francisco.
- Joseph Alfred Dobbs MBE, First Secretary at His Majesty's Embassy in Moscow.
- Charles Emlyn Evans, lately Works Manager, Anglo-Iranian Oil Company, Abadan.
- Christopher Nicholas Halkias MBE, First Secretary at His Majesty's Embassy in Athens.
- Guy George Hannaford, First Secretary and Legal Adviser at His Majesty's Embassy in Rome.
- John William Jackson, lately Fields Manager, Southern District, Anglo-Iranian Oil Company, Persia.
- Richard Guise Jacobs, Traffic Manager, Sudan Railways.
- Bernard Ivan James, Chief Governmental Officer, Hanover, Control Commission for Germany (British Element).
- John Wilson Kernick, British subject resident in Turkey.
- Robert Bates Kirby, First Secretary (Labour) at His Majesty's Embassy in Warsaw.
- Ivy Mallows MBE, lately Matron of the Maude Memorial Hospital, Basra.
- Robert Lanier Knight , Senior Economic Botanist to the Sudan Government.
- Donald Ritch Macmillan, lately Director of the Sociedad Commercial Anglo-Ecuatoriana Limitada, Quito
- Robert George Colin McNab, British Council Representative in Turkey.
- Percival Arthur North, lately His Majesty's Consul at Nanking.
- Keith Randell, Intelligence Division, Control Commission for Germany (British Element).
- Major William Follett Routley, British Consul at Ajaccio.

==== Members ====
- Edward Barrs, Control Officer I, Düsseldorf, Control Commission for Germany (British Element).
- Charles Taylor Bennett, British Vice Consul at Istanbul.
- Hector Raphael Ange Carmel Bianchi, British subject resident in Tunis.
- Raleigh Keay Blackwood, lately Engineer with the Anglo-Iranian Oil Company in Persia.
- Anthony Cumbo, British Pro-Consulate, Alexandria.
- Captain Llewellyn Rayner John Crossly Dale MC, British Vice-Consul at La Libertad.
- Harry Ebbage, Police Staff Officer Grade II, Control Commission for Germany (British Element).
- George William Reginald Gilbert, Archivist at His Majesty's Embassy in Tehran.
- James Gordon Grierson, British Post Master at Tangier.
- John Sinclair Hewitt, Senior Locust Officer of the Desert Locust Survey Unit in Saudi Arabia.
- Francis William Llewellyn James, Accountant at His Majesty's Embassy in Washington.
- William Stribley Lacey, British subject resident in the Argentine Republic.
- William Chalmers Lyall, lately His Majesty's Vice-Consul at Hankow.
- Edward Francis Joseph McDonough, Market Officer at His Majesty's Embassy in Bagdad.
- Patrick Joseph McGill BEM, Officer Commanding Eritrean Police Field Force (Grade II), Eritrea.
- Vera Irene McIlwraith, Shorthand typist at His Majesty's Legation in Helsinki.
- Basil Gardner McTaggart. For services in Austria under the Save The Children Fund.
- Major Florence Ethel Mitchell for services with the Salvation Army in Germany.
- Thela Margaret Todd-Naylor, British Pro-Consulate, Geneva.
- George Edward Sherman Norris, Secretary to the Sudan Government London Agency.
- Frank Peet, Senior Executive Officer, Control Commission for Germany (British Element).
- Dorothy Ridge, lately Matron, Abadan Hospital, Persia.
- William Stephen Sinclair, Archivist at His Majesty's Embassy at Kabul.
- Frank Smttherman, lately Acting British Consul-General at Amoy.
- Evelyn Kate Tindall, Archivist at His Majesty's Legation to the Holy See.
- Ronald Alexander Morley Welsh, lately British Council Accountant in France.
- Ladislaus Zilahi, Senior Temporary Assistant at His Majesty's Embassy in Vienna.

==== Commanders ====
- Norman Murray Gladstone Gratton, For service to education in the State of South Australia.
- Major Hugh Godfrey Mundy OBE, Member of the Land Settlement Board, Southern Rhodesia.
- William Herbert Roddick, President of Prince Henry's Hospital, Melbourne, State of Victoria.

==== Officers ====
- William Baragwanath, Geological Consultant to the Department of Mines, State of Victoria.
- John Percy Hamilton Baxter. For social welfare and philanthropic services in Geelong, State of Victoria.
- Ivor Treharme Birtwistle, For social welfare services, especially on behalf of young people in the State of Western Australia.
- William Goldsmith Burges JP. For services to agriculture in the State of Western Australia.
- John Cowie, Secretary for Education, Southern Rhodesia.
- Ellen Cumber, Secretary, Society for the Oversea Settlement of British Women.
- Thomas John Russell Dashwood, Assistant Chief Secretary in the Office of His Majesty's High Commissioner for Basutoland, the Bechuanaland Protectorate and Swaziland.
- Commander Alexander James Eardley Duncan, Chairman of the Board and Manager of the Land Bank, Southern Rhodesia.
- Manuel Lazarus Freedman , Director of Medical Services, Bechuanaland Protectorate.
- Dudley Charles Hodson, Chairman, Assam Branch, Indian Tea Association.
- Arthur James Hopton, President of the Historical Society, State of Victoria.
- Charles MacKay Keddie, Chairman of the Calcutta Jute Fabrics Shippers' Association.
- Marian, Lady Macmillan. For services rendered under the auspices of the Victoria League in connection with hospitality to visitors from overseas.
- The Honourable William George McKenzie. For public services in the State of Victoria.
- Reginald Ernest Hastings Carew Reid, Chief Parliamentary Reporter, State of Western Australia.
- James Kintore Schramm, Chairman of the District Council of Tumby Bay, State of South Australia.
- Walter Sole, Member of the Natural Resources Board, Southern Rhodesia.
- Henry Edward Tregaskis Spotswood MC JP, of Scottsdale, State of Tasmania. For services to the community.
- Karl Rawdon Von Stieglitz JP. For charitable services in the State of Tasmania.
- Hubert Norman David Wicks, a prominent horticulturist in the State of South Australia.

==== Members ====
- Algernon Abbott, Municipal Engineer, Shire of Dundas, State of Victoria.
- Madeline Grace Adams. For social welfare services in the State of Tasmania.
- Beryl Eileen Reece Armstrong. For social welfare services to the United Kingdom community in Madras.
- Flora Beatrice Buxton, Honorary Organising Secretary of St. Vincent's Hospital Red Cross Auxiliaries, State of Victoria.
- Gladys May Carrow. For services rendered under the auspices of the Victoria League in connection with hospitality to visitors from overseas.
- Evelyn Margrethe Cornfoot. For social welfare services in the State of Victoria.
- Arthur John Alexander Douglas, Assistant District Officer, Basutoland.
- James Fraser Duguid. For services to music in Southern Rhodesia.
- Frank Ellis, Principal of Melbourne Technical College, State of Victoria.
- Percivale Cardross Grant, District Officer, Bechuanaland Protectorate.
- Horace Neal Harvey, Superintendent of War Service Land Settlement, State of South Australia.
- Florence Lanoma Josephine Shogg. For social welfare services in the State of Tasmania.
- Helene Davina Hugo, Principal of the Margaret Hugo School for The Blind, Southern Rhodesia.
- The Honourable Sarah Myfida Mary Tyrellkenyon, Joint Hospitality Secretary, Victoria League for services to visitors from overseas.
- Muriel Pauline Mallinson, Headmistress of CMS Girls' School, Srinagar, India.
- Margaret Baird Martin. For social welfare services under the auspices of the Royal Adelaide Hospital Auxiliary and the Royal British Nurses' Association, State of South Australia.
- Janet McDonald. For services to nursing in the State of Western Australia.
- Charles Molyneux, of Fremantle, State of Western Australia for services to the community.
- The Reverend Canon Samuel Muhlanga, of Southern Rhodesia. In recognition of his long and devoted service to the African people.
- Elsie Fraser Munn, Principal of the Rhodesia Academy of Music in Bulawayo, Southern Rhodesia.
- Nora Price. For social welfare services in Southern Rhodesia.
- Major Arthur Ivan Rice, Warden of St. Joseph's House, Southern Rhodesia. For services in the training of boys.
- Fannie Rose Rudeforth. For social welfare services in the State of Western Australia.
- Walter James Smith. For municipal services in Wangaratta, State of Victoria.
- Gideon John Swart, Interpreter in the Magistrate's Courts, Southern Rhodesia.
- Kathleen Lucy Waterhouse, Matron of the Adelaide Children's Hospital, State of South Australia.
- Charles Henry Williams, Senior Postmaster, Basutoland.

=== Order of The British Empire (Civil Division) (Overseas II) ===
==== Knights Commander ====
- Lieutenant-General Sir Harold-Rawdon Briggs KCIE CB CBE DSO, lately Director of Operations, Federation of Malaya.
- Tancheng Lock CBE. For public services in the Federation of Malaya.

==== Commanders ====
- Wilfred Henry Blyth Buckhurst, Colonial Survey Service, Director of Lands, Mines & Surveys, Fiji.
- James Traer Chappel. For public Services in Malaya.
- William Charles Stewart Corry, Colonial Administrative Service, British Adviser, Pahang, Federation of Malaya.
- Sidney Cuthbert Farrington. For public Services in the Bahamas.
- George Ormsby Higgins, lately Managing Director, Sarawak Oilfields Limited.
- James Arthur Hill, lately Official Representative, Colonial Income Tax Office.
- William George Noel Lightfoot OBE, Chief Establishment Officer, Northern Rhodesia.
- The Reverend Thomas Adeshina Jacobsen Ogunbiyi OBE. For public services in Nigeria.
- Arthur Lawrence Pennington OBE, Colonial Administrative Service, lately Director of Refugees, Tanganyika.
- Philip James Rogers, lately General Manager, Nigeria Tobacco Company. For public services in Nigeria.
- Homfray Welby Solomon OBE. For public services in St. Helena.
- William Frederick Wegener, lately Chief Mechanical Engineer, Malayan Railway.
- Richard Walter Youngman. For public services in Jamaica.

==== Officers ====
- James Jarvis Baker, Principal of The Methodist Boys High School, Bathurst. Gambia.
- Trelawney William Tabrum Bangs. For public services in Malaya.
- Douglas Basil Barber, Colonial Administrative Service, Senior District Commissioner, Zanzibar.
- Captain George Neville Beaumont, Resident Engineer and Architect, Mombasa Institute of Moslem Education, Kenya.
- George Trafford Bell, Colonial Administrative Service, District Officer (District Commissioner), Mbulu District, Tanganyika.
- Michael Louis Bernacchi, Colonial Administrative Service, Acting District Officer, Kinta, Perak, Federation of Malaya.
- Esau Adolphus Feijimi Brandon, Government Printer, Sierra Leone.
- Richard Neville Broome MC, Colonial Administrative Service Officer Class 3, Malayan Civil Service.
- John Sjovald Hoseason Cunyngham-Brown, Colonial Administrative Service, Commissioner of Lands and Mines, and Johore State Resettlement Officer, Federation of Malaya.
- Arthur John Campbell, Ceramic Specialist, East Africa Industrial Research Board, East Africa High Commission.
- Chan Tian Joo. For public services in North Borneo.
- Iqbal Chand Chopra. For public services in Tanganyika.
- Major Victor James Alexander Lillie-Costello MC, Public Relations Officer, Gold Coast.
- Kenneth Hay Dale. For public services in Uganda.
- Archie George Lewis Douglas, lately Divisional Manager, Cable & Wireless (West Indies) Limited, Barbados.
- Ebenezer Duncan. For public services in St. Vincent, Windward Islands.
- Hubert Earnshaw, Colonial Education Service Director of Education, Sarawak.
- Harold Neal Fahey. For public services in Trinidad.
- Richard Aylmer Frost MBE, Representative of the British Council in East Africa.
- Charles Gaggero JP. For public services in Gibraltar.
- Alexander Graham MINA, Surveyor-General of Ships, Singapore.
- Albert Wilfred Griffin. For public services in Montserrat, Leeward Islands.
- Maurice Caedmon Hoole MC, Labour Adviser, Nyasaland.
- The Very Reverend Adelakun Williamson Howells, Provost of Christ Church Cathedral, Nigeria.
- Arthur Hugh Peters Humphrey, Colonial Administrative Service, Acting Principal Assistant Secretary, Federation of Malaya.
- Monsignor Richard Mary Lee, Vicar General of the Diocese of Port-Louis, Mauritius.
- The Reverend Richard Arthur Lockhart, Principal, Government African Teacher Training Centre & Secondary School, Kagumo, Kenya.
- Charles Robert Harley Nott, Colonial Administrative Service, District Commissioner, Western District, Fiji.
- Solomon Edmund Odamtten. For public services in the Gold Coast.
- Bernard Stuart Passmore, lately Colliery Manager, Enugu Coalfield, Nigeria.
- Edgar Ringwood, Head of Department (Grade B), Crown Agents for the Colonies.
- George Hosford Scott JP, Labour Adviser to the Government, Jamaica.
- Thomas Scott, Assistant Director (Architect), Public Works Department, Nigeria.
- Alick Louis Simpkins MICE AMIMechE, lately Director of Public Works, Northern Rhodesia.
- Captain Joseph Richard Ullo, lately Commissioner of Police, Malta.
- U Tat Che. For public services in Hong Kong.
- Wanlu Shing, Senior Inspector of Schools, Hong Kong.
- Major Jesse West MC. For public services in Nigeria.
- Oliver William Wolters, Colonial Administrative Service, Officer Class II, Malayan Civil Service.
- William Harris Wroth. For public services in Northern Rhodesia.

==== Officers ====
- Abubakar Tafawa Balewa, Education Officer, Bauchi Native Authority, Nigeria.
- Sulemanu, Emir of Abuja. For public services in Nigeria.
- Adeshida, Deji of Akure and Head Chief of Akure District, Nigeria.
- Emmanuel Akinlabi Sanda. For public services in Nigeria.

==== Members ====
- Mark Addo, President, Gold Coast Co-Operative Marketing Association.
- Mohamed Ali bin Mohamed ED, Inspector of Malay Schools, Selangor, Federation of Malaya.
- Costas Antoniou Ashiotis, Assistant Commissioner of Labour, Cyprus.
- Abdullah Hanafi. For public services in Brunei.
- Elsie Baker, Sister-in-Charge, Kawimbe Leper Settlement, Northern Rhodesia.
- Margaret Batchelder, Queen Elizabeth's Colonial Nursing Service, Matron, Bahamas General Hospital.
- Joshua Uberto Beckett, Colonial Police Service, Senior Assistant Superintendent of Police, Jamaica.
- Iris Best. For public services in Sierra Leone.
- Miriam Brazier, Principal, Women's Training Centre, Ibekwe Mission, Opobo, Nigeria.
- Aldyth Hilda Brierley. For social and welfare services in Trinidad.
- Raymond Arthur Brown. For welfare services in Hong Kong.
- John Cartmell, Colonial Audit Service, Principal Auditor, Mauritius.
- Egbert Constantine Clarkson Cassells. For public services in Jamaica.
- Cheng Hui Ming (alias Homer Cheng), Assistant to the Secretary for Chinese Affairs, Singapore.
- John Anthony Cradock, Colonial Administrative Service, District Officer, Batang Padang, Perak, Federation of Malaya.
- Dunstan Cuthbert, Senior Accountant, Treasury, Kenya.
- Denise Montgomery Dane, Senior Nursing Sister (Matron), Roseau Hospital, Dominica, Windward Islands.
- Thomas Daniel Evans, Colonial Education Service, Principal, Njala Training College, Sierra Leone.
- John Fraser, Clerk of Works, Class I, Public Works Department, Hong Kong.
- Alice Emily Gosling, Librarian-Secretary, Bermuda Library.
- Verna Cecille Henriques, Honorary Secretary of the Jamaica Branch of the British Red Cross Society.
- Allan Alexander Heustis, Assessor of Income Tax, British Honduras.
- William Hogg, Assistant Works Manager, Public Works Department, Nigeria.
- John Henry Holley, Colonial Police Service, Assistant Superintendent of Police, Jamaica.
- Isobel Margaret Hutton, Queen Elizabeth's Colonial Nursing Service, Sister Tutor, Nurses' Training College, Gold Coast.
- Ip Tin Shang, Special Class Clerk and Court Interpreter, Hong Kong.
- George Kontu Blankson De Graft Johnson, Assistant Locomotive Superintendent, Gold Coast Railways.
- Wilfred Basil Ralph Jones MRCS LRCP, Medical Officer, District I, Montserrat, Leeward Islands.
- Mehmed Ragip Kanaan, Assistant Registrar of Co-Operative Societies, Cyprus.
- Mary Adam Kennedy, Welfare Officer, Domasi Community Development Scheme, Nyasaland.
- Christos Kikkbdes. For public services in Tanganyika.
- Ronald Greaves Ladkin , Colonial Medical Service, Medical Officer, Uganda.
- John Nyuk Lee, lately Assistant Education Officer, North Borneo.
- Herbert Henry Leys, Assistant Engineer, Civil Engineering Department, Crown Agents for the Colonies.
- Herbert Bismark Lind. For public services in British Honduras.
- Goburdunsing Luchman, Inspector of Primary Schools, Mauritius.
- Audley Arnott Lyder, First Assistant Director of Works & Hydraulics, Trinidad.
- Clarence Charles McNally, Finance Officer, Posts & Telegraphs Department, East Africa High Commission.
- Edward McPhee, Chief Pharmacist, Northern Rhodesia.
- Ian Beaumont Mendel, Colonial Administrative Service, District Officer, Temerloh, Pahang, Federation of Malaya.
- Grace Anne Morrison. For nursing services in Fiji.
- Frederick Rudolph Moultrie, Chief Mechanical Engineer, Electrical Department, Bahamas.
- Marguerite Estelle Moultrie. For social and welfare services in Zanzibar.
- Stella Winifred Notley, Clerk (Grade T), Kenya Police Headquarters.
- James Hamilton Parker, Board of Trade Inspector, Bermuda.
- Louis Peter Paul, Assistant Controller of Immigration, Federation of Malaya.
- Agnes Dorothy Peterkins. For educational and social welfare services in Nyasaland.
- Mary Eugenie Pickering (Mother Eugenie), Mother Superior, St. Francis' Convent, Jesselton, North Borneo.
- Frances Rolleson (Sister Mary Frances). For services to education in Tanganyika.
- Olive Eugenie Rose, lately Senior Clerk, Colonial Secretary's Office, British Guiana.
- Eliki Seru, Organising Teacher and Leader, Moturiki Community Development Team, Fiji.
- Patricia Sharp, Chairman of The Jamaica Federation of Women.
- Robert Boardman Silcock, Superintendent of Agriculture, Tanganyika.
- Edward Charles Sowe, Postmaster General, Gambia.
- Olive Rosalie Ward Stone, Headmistress, Victoria Girls School, and Temporary Principal, Mistresses Training Centre, Cyprus.
- Thomas Dundas Towers, Colonial Audit Service, Principal Auditor, Windward Islands
- Pierre Tyack, For public services in Mauritius.
- Musa Wagude, Special Grade Clerk, Education Department, Kenya.
- Charles Gerald Watts, Social Welfare Officer, Grade.41, Federation of Malaya.
- Henry Huibert White, Area Superintendent, Northern Nigeria, West African Airways Corporation, Nigeria.
- John Lodwick Wykes, Superintendent of Works, Public Works Department, Uganda.
- Yap Pheng Geek. For public services in Singapore.
- Datu Abang Zin, Native Officer, Sarawak Civil Service.

==== Honorary Members ====
- Abdul Aziz bin Ismail, Resettlement Officer, Federation of Malaya.
- John Musoke Williams, Special Grade Clerk, Accountant-General's Department, Kenya.
- Muhammadu Ribadu. For public services in Nigeria.
- Shettima Kashim. For public services in Nigeria.
- Chief James Ladejo Ogunsola. For public services in Nigeria.
- James Essien Udoh. For public services in Nigeria.
- Max Allwell Brown. For public services in Aba, Nigeria.
- Chief Samuel Ogunwale. For public services in Nigeria.
- Josiah Osibajo Adeusi, lately Chief Clerk, General Manager's Office, Nigerian Railway.
- Samuel Nwachukwu Obi, Senior Accountant, Accountant-General's Department, Nigeria.
- Chief Humbi II s/o Ziota, Chief of Ussongo, Nzega District, Tanganyika.

=== British Empire Medals (BEM) (Military Division) ===
Royal Navy

- Chief Petty Officer Cook (S) Charles Edgeworth Ball.
- Chief Wren (Clothing) Betty Winifred Barron, WRNS.
- Chief Engine Room Artificer Bernard Colby DSM.
- Chief Petty Officer Telegraphist (S) David Eaglesham Couperthwaite.
- Able Seaman Walter George Crane.
- Chief Petty Officer Stuart Maurice Hugh Duffay.
- Chief Petty Officer Writer Lawrence Robert Howard Ellis.
- Chief Petty Officer Writer Kenneth Sylvanus Charles Ferris.
- Chief Engine Room Artificer George Thompson Foy DSM.
- Chief Petty Officer Writer Stanley Gatrell.
- Quartermaster Sergeant Harry Green, Royal Marines.
- Petty Officer Robert Warneford Hall.
- Sergeant Frederick William Harvey, Royal Marines.
- Chief Petty Officer Cook (S) John Henry Thubbard DSM.
- Master-At-Arms George Avenell Johnston.
- Acting Leading Stoker Mechanic Edward John Maurice Mallion.
- Chief Ordnance Artificer Samuel Richard Manicom.
- Chief Wren Seward (O) Robina May Morton, WRNS.
- Chief Yeoman of Signals John Mc Kenzie Nisbet, RNVR.
- Regimental Sergeant Major William Pulton Packwood, Royal Marines.
- Stores Chief Petty Officer Maurice John Perrin.
- Mechanician 1st Class Frank Edward Poole.
- Chief Engine Room Artificer Sidney Charles Rundle DSM.
- Chief Petty Officer Steward Leonard Saffin.
- Chief Petty Officer Writer Charles Lewis Snailham.
- Sick Berth Chief Petty Officer Frank Kinlay Toulson.
- Petty Officer Cook (S) John Henry Turner.
- Master-At-Arms Ernest Henry Ward.
- Yeoman of Signals Leonard George Whitrod.
- Chief Petty Officer Albert Edward Young.

Army

- Sergeant Sidney Allan, Corps of Royal Military Police.
- Warrant Officer Class II (Acting) Frederick Arthur Allen, Military Provost Staff Corps.
- Sergeant George Bedingfield, Royal Regiment of Artillery.
- Company-Quartermaster-Sergeant Thomas Stevenson Black, Royal Army Service Corps, Territorial Army.
- Staff-Sergeant Ralph Ernest Blair, Corps of Royal Engineers.
- Sergeant Dorothy Briant, Women's Royal Army Corps.
- Staff-Sergeant (Acting) Stanley Douglas Brooks, Royal Army Service Corps.
- Sergeant Robert Geoffrey Camp, Royal Army Medical Corps.
- Sergeant (Acting) James Reid Campbell, Royal Army Service Corps.
- Regimental Sergeant-Major Chepkwonyarapsoo, The King's African Rifles.
- Staff-Sergeant Harold Clapham, Corps of Royal Military Police.
- Staff-Sergeant (Artificer) James George Clark, Royal Regiment of Artillery.
- Artisan Staff-Sergeant Peter Alfred Clements, Corps of Royal Electrical & Mechanical Engineers.
- Staff-Sergeant Victor Clements, Royal Army Service Corps.
- Sergeant Harry Batley Cobb, Royal Tank Regiment, Royal Armoured Corps, Territorial Army.
- Warrant Officer Class II (Acting) John Conlon, Royal Regiment of Artillery.
- Corporal Henry Gibson, The Black Watch (Royal Highland Regiment), Territorial Army.
- Colour-Sergeant (Drum Major) William Gordon Graham, Scots Guards.
- Staff-Sergeant George Walter Gaskin Harmer, Corps of Royal Electrical & Mechanical Engineers.
- Sergeant (Acting) Benjamin Hill, Royal Army Service Corps.
- Corporal (Acting) Maurice William Horton, The Royal Welch Fusiliers.
- Sergeant John William Taylor Humphrey, Corps of Royal Electrical & Mechanical Engineers, Territorial Army.
- Warrant Officer Class II (Acting) Richard Frank Humphries, Royal Corps of Signals.
- Sergeant William Henry Johns, Corps of Royal Engineers, Territorial Army.
- Sergeant Thomas Henry Kernaghan, Corps of Royal Military Police.
- Warrant Officer Class I (Acting) Ernest Thomas Lilley MM, The South Staffordshire Regiment.
- Regimental Drum-Sergeant Mamabole, The Gold Coast Regiment.
- Sergeant Frederick Mann, Corps of Royal Electrical & Mechanical Engineers.
- Staff-Sergeant (Acting) Leonard Edward Marlow, Army Catering Corps.
- Staff-Sergeant William Francis Morgan, Royal Army Medical Corps.
- Sergeant William Morrison, The Highland Light Infantry (City of Glasgow Regiment), Territorial Army.
- Sergeant Charles Joseph Nixon, Royal Army Service Corps, Territorial Army.
- Corporal (Cook) Jonathan Phiri, The King's African Rifles.
- Warrant Officer Class II (Acting) Denis Poore, Corps of Royal Military Police.
- Staff-Sergeant (Artificer) Henry Scoble, Royal Regiment of Artillery.
- Staff-Sergeant (Clerk) Sherbahadurrai, 6th Gurkha Rifles, The Brigade of Gurkhas.
- Staff-Sergeant Edward Sydney Smith, Corps of Royal Engineers.
- Warrant Officer Class II (Acting) Miriam Spokes, Women's Royal Army Corps.
- Staff-Sergeant Jessie Stewart, Women's Royal Army Corps.
- Sergeant Albert James Swain, Royal Regiment of Artillery.
- Staff-Sergeant Albert Tilley, Royal Army Service Corps.
- Staff-Sergeant Charles Hubert Leslie Turner, Royal Army Pay Corps.
- Sergeant Lucy Emily Verrall, Women's Royal Army Corps.
- Corporal (Acting) (now Sapper) John Grenville Walker, Corps of Royal Engineers.

Royal Air Force

- Flight Sergeant Victor Ashley Charles Charrison.
- Flight Sergeant Frederick Lionel Clarke.
- Flight Sergeant William Cottam.
- Flight Sergeant Henry-William Cunnington.
- Flight Sergeant Robert Gray Ferrier.
- Flight Sergeant (now Acting Warrant Officer) George Arthur Green.
- Flight Sergeant Ivor Clarence Handley.
- Flight Sergeant Gerald Wallace Hayhoe, Royal Auxiliary Air Force.
- Flight Sergeant Robert John Clarence Llewellyn.
- Flight Sergeant Donald McKenzie, Royal Auxiliary Air Force.
- Flight Sergeant Kenneth McLaren.
- Flight Sergeant (now Warrant Officer) Percival Harold Mason.
- Flight Sergeant James Scott Milne.
- Flight Sergeant James Ridley Pringle.
- Flight Sergeant Henry Scullion.
- Flight Sergeant MacDonald Seymour Sparks.
- Flight Sergeant George Webber.
- Flight Sergeant Ronald Ernest Whitbourn.
- Flight Sergeant Harold Arthur Rowson Wright.
- Chief Technician Bernard Longstaff.
- Acting Flight Sergeant Betty Barber, WRAF.
- Sergeant Charles Jeffery Astles.
- Sergeant Harry Bloore.
- Sergeant Louis Peter Hadfield.
- Sergeant John William George Hosking.
- Sergeant John Thynne-Russell.
- Acting Sergeant Patrick Joseph McCartan.
- Corporal Norman Butchart Lawton.
- Corporal Reginald Oakes.
- Acting Corporal John Noel Whitehead.

=== British Empire Medals (Military Division), Korea ===
In recognition of non-operational services in Japan in connection with operations in Korea

Royal Navy

- Leading Writer William Sorbie.

Army

- Staff-Sergeant Frederick Briggs, Royal Army Ordnance Corps.
- Staff-Sergeant (Acting) Robert Gibbs, Royal Army Service Corps
- Warrant Officer Class II (Acting) Austin Joyce MM, Welsh Guards.
- Warrant Officer Class II (Local) Frederick Charles Walker, 10th Royal Hussars (Prince of Wales's Own), Royal Armoured Corps.

Royal Air Force

- Sergeant Leslie Maurice Hampson.

=== British Empire Medals (Civil Division) ===
United Kingdom

- John Henry Abbatt, Permanent Chargeman of Skilled Labourers, Armament Depot, Priddy's Hard, Gosport, Hampshire.
- William Henry Addis, Foreman, George Senior & Sons Ltd., Sheffield.
- John Hamilton Allan, Surface Foreman, Twechar No.1 Colliery, Scottish Division, National Coal Board.
- George Meikle Allardyce, Estate Overseer, Department of Agriculture for Scotland.
- Sidney Herbert Arnold, Special Leading Hand, Hampton Court Gardens, Ministry of Works.
- Thomas Hearle Baker, Head Gardener, French District, Imperial War Graves Commission.
- David James Barber, Office Keeper, Festival of Britain Office.
- Thomas Henry Barrow, Staff Trainer and Vacuum Operator, W.M. Adams & Son Ltd., Stoke-on-Trent.
- Alice Elsie Beck, Honorary Collector, Street Savings Group, Sparkhill, Birmingham.
- William George Belcham, Technical Grade III, Military Engineering Experimental Establishment, Ministry of Supply, Christchurch.
- William Bourne JP, Checkweighman, Brancepeth Colliery, Durham Division, National Coal Board.
- Bernard John Brown, Boiler House Foreman, Walthamstow Generating Station, London Division, British Electricity Authority.
- James Donald Brymer, Borstal Officer, Polmont Borstal Institution, Falkirk.
- Charles Edward Cairns, Assistant Foreman Fitter, Harland & Wolff Ltd., Belfast.
- Edward Joseph Cannan, Linen Keeper, SS Ruahine, New Zealand Shipping Company Ltd., Woodford, Essex.
- Edwin Geddes Carr, Carpenter, Holland, Hannen & Cubitts Ltd. For services to the Festival of Britain.
- James Christopher Charlton, Substation Attendant, North Eastern Electricity Board, Philadelphia, Co. Durham.
- Dorothy Clark, Honorary Organiser and Collector, Pinnell Road Savings Group, Eltham.
- Dorothy Edith Coaker, Supervisor of Cleaners, HM Treasury.
- Eleanor Maud Collins, Sub-Office Assistant, Post Office, Bow Brickhill, Bletchley, Buckinghamshire.
- Sidney Harold Cook, Class II storekeeper, Ordnance Survey Department, Southampton.
- Thomas Austin Cook, lately Senior Outdoor Officer, Mercantile Marine Office, Ministry of Transport, Barry.
- Henry Cooke, Postman, Higher Grade, North London Telegraph Centre, General Post Office, Kingsbury, NW9.
- Leonard Cooke, Dirt Inspector, Renishaw Colliery, East Midlands Division, National Coal Board.
- William Stephen Dalrymple, Army Recruiter, Southern Command, War Office.
- Mary Ethel Danby, Chief Inspector, West Riding of Yorkshire Constabulary.
- Jose Danino, Storewright-In-Charge, HM Dockyard, Gibraltar.
- Thomas John Davies, Line Leader, Salvage Section, Hoover (Washing Machines) Ltd., Dowlais, Glamorganshire.
- Albert Ernest Dawton, Station Officer, Hampshire Fire Brigade.
- Charles Joseph de Bourde, Senior Assistant (Scientific), RAF Station Chigwell.
- Robert Dennet, Depot Manager, Glasgow, House Coal Distribution (Emergency) Scheme.
- Leopold Gordon Dennington, Boatswain, MV Graigddu, Graig Shipping Company Ltd., Edinburgh.
- Sidney Ernest Dent, Head Roller, Consett Iron Company Ltd., Co. Durham.
- William Shiel Dick, Working Caulker, Furness Shipbuilding Company Ltd., Billingham, Co. Durham.
- John William Dickinson, Technician, Class I, Engineering Department, General Post Office, Grimsby.
- Ambrose Dilley, Assistant Chief Meter Inspector, Leicester Sub-Area, East Midlands Electricity Board.
- George Dilly, Fireman, SS Belravock, London & Edinburgh Shipping Company Ltd., Edinburgh.
- David Dobie, Chargehand, Joseph Johnston Ltd., Lochwinnoch, Renfrewshire.
- William Douglas, Skilled Labourer, Ministry of Finance, Northern Ireland.
- Albert Duxbury, Shuttle-Maker, Kirk & Company (Blackburn) Ltd.
- William Edington, General Foreman, Dalmarnock Gas Works, Glasgow, Scottish Gas Board.
- Ida Grace Edwardes, Honorary Collector, Sandhurst Savings Group, Kent.
- William Percy Elton, Chargehand Joiner, Royal Aircraft Establishment, Ministry of Supply, Farnborough.
- Walter Charles Embleton, lately Technical Grade II, Explosives Research & Development Establishment, Ministry of Supply, Waltham Abbey.
- John Frederick Erlam, Clerk of Works, Northolt Airport, Air Ministry.
- David William Evans, Overman, Park Colliery, South Western Division, National Coal Board.
- Charles John Eves, Superintendent, Grimsby Exchange Ltd.
- Samuel Findlay, Underground Repairer, Knockshinnoch Castle Colliery, Scottish Division, National Coal Board.
- Percy Victor Fisher, Principal Foreman, No. 35 Maintenance Unit, RAF Heywood.
- John William Fleck, Telephone Mechanic, Factories Department, General Post Office, Islington.
- Frank Flecknoe, Timber Inspector, Wm. Lawrence & Company Ltd., Colwick, Nottingham.
- Fanny Elizabeth Tate Hunter Fletcher, Mule Piecer, David Dixon & Son Ltd., Leeds.
- Robert Charles Floyd, Croydon District Inspector, South Eastern Gas Board.
- Robert John Foy. For services as Handloom Weaver, J. McCollum, Waringstown, Co. Down, and to the Festival of Britain.
- James Henry French, Underground Conveyor Transfer Point Attendant, Sherwood Colliery, East Midlands Division, National Coal Board.
- Frederick William Frost, Leading Turbine Driver, South Eastern Division, British Electricity Authority.
- John William Gamble, Gardener-Caretaker, North West European District, Imperial War Graves Commission.
- Elsie Sutcliffe Gibb, Centre Organiser, Felling Urban District, Women's Voluntary Services.
- James Girvan, Assistant Foreman, Singer Manufacturing Company Ltd., Clydebank.
- George Godding, Switchgear Fitter, General Electric Company Ltd., Birmingham.
- John Goodwin, Screenhand and Railway Shunter, Chatterley-Whitfield Colliery, West Midlands Division, National Coal Board.
- Agnes Gray, Home Help, Lanark County.
- Edith Rebecca Hall, Honorary Organiser and Collector, Street Savings Group, Finaghy, Co. Antrim.
- Frederick Charles Hamblin, Engineering Technical Grade II, Royal Ordnance Factory, Chorley.
- Elsia Winifred Hamlyn, Supervisor, Telephone Exchange Paddington, Railway Executive.
- William John Hampton, Coal Filler, Hartford Colliery, Northern (Northumberland & Cumberland) Division, National Coal Board.
- William Hodgson Harper, Sub-Postmaster, Garsdale Head Sub-Office, Sedbergh, Yorkshire.
- Elizabeth Harrald, Canteen Supervisor, W.H. McConnell & Sons, Liverpool.
- John Henry Harrald, Fitting Shop Foreman, Robert Boby Ltd., Bury St Edmunds.
- George Victor Harris, Master, Cross Sand Light Vessel, Corporation of Trinity House, Yarmouth.
- Harry Harris, Foreman, Banbury Cold Store, Banbury.
- David John Harvey, Senior Collector, North Thames Gas Board, Finchley.
- Thomas Edward Hassell, Foreman Craftsman, Public Record Office, Potters Bar, Middlesex.
- William Heath, Chargehand Turbine Driver, Blackburn Meadows Power Station, Yorkshire Division, British Electricity Authority, Sheffield.
- Florence Hellard, General Forewoman, Mettoy Ltd., Swansea.
- Marjorie Ellen Helsdon, Chief Supervisor of Sorting Assistants, Savings Department, General Post Office, South Norwood.
- George Percy Hibbs, Leading Patternmaker, British Thomson-Houston Company Ltd., Rugby.
- George Albert William Hicks, General Foreman, Richard Costain Ltd. For services to the Festival of Britain.
- Henry Charles Hopkins, Senior Foreman of Storehouses, Admiralty, New Cross.
- William Howell, Deputy, Nostell Colliery, North Eastern Division, National Coal Board.
- Tena Vittoria Hutchings, Canteen Worker, Penarth Unit, Sea Cadet Corps.
- Thomas Henry Ingham, Inspector, Gwynedd Special Constabulary.
- Wallace George Isaac, Engine Driver, Southern Region, Railway Executive.
- Annette Jacobs, Honorary Street Savings Group Organiser and Collector, Golders Green.
- William John Jacobs, Chief Warehouse Supervisor, HM Stationery Office.
- Ernest Edward Jeacock, Chief Wardmaster, Ministry of Pensions Hospital, Chapel Allerton, Leeds.
- Olwen Jeremiah, Factory Supervisor and Instructor, Corgi Hosiery Ltd.
- Thomas Bertram Judd, Chief Inspector (Postal), Head Post Office, Southampton.
- James Kennedy, Supervising Steel Erector, Carter Horseley (Engineers) Ltd. For services to the Festival of Britain.
- Arthur King, Foreman Joiner, Bankside Works, Hull, North Eastern Gas Board.
- Edward Paul King, Civilian Mechanist, War Office, Singapore.
- George Knight, Coalface Worker, Tilmanstone Colliery, Southeastern Division, National Coal Board.
- Ernest William Land, Range Warden, Cannock Chase, Staffordshire.
- Edward Albert Langley, Foreman Scaffolder, Richard Costain Ltd. For services to the Festival of Britain.
- James Lennie, Stove and Range Metal Fitter, Smith & Wellstood Ltd.
- Emanuel Leonardi, Donkeyman, SS Deerpool, Sir R. Ropner & Company (Management) Ltd.
- Annie Maud Lloyd, Centre Organiser, Llandilo Rural District Council, Women's Voluntary Services.
- Alexander McDonald, Shepherd, Braedownie, Glen Clova, Angus.
- William Fenwick Macdonald, Technical Officer, Head Post Office, Stornoway, Isle of Lewis.
- Thomas McDonnell, Chief Inspector, Port of London Authority Police Force.
- William McGarvey, Sub-District Commandant, Ulster Special Constabulary, Waterside, Londonderry.
- William McKenzie, Driver, Scottish Omnibuses Ltd., Edinburgh.
- David McLaren, Senior Ship Inspector, Ministry of Agriculture, Northern Ireland.
- Robert McPhail McLellan, Company Officer, Western Scotland Area Fire Brigade.
- Daniel McQuilkin, Member, Coast Life Saving Corps, Rathlin Island, Co. Antrim.
- Mathew Madden, Senior Foreman Electrician, B. French Ltd., Belfast. For services to the Festival of Britain.
- Charles George Robson Marriott, Head Porter, Lord Great Chamberlain's Department, House of Lords.
- Wilfred Millard, Foreman, Crane Ltd., Ipswich.
- John Treganowan Mitchell, Assistant Overseer, Grade I, Admiralty.
- William E. Mitchell, General Foreman, Affric Hydro-Electric Scheme.
- John Moore, Ratefixer, Morris Motors Ltd.
- Sydney Jack Moore, Non-Technical Grade IV, Aeroplane & Armament Experimental Establishment, Ministry of Supply, Boscombe Down.
- Frederick George Morgan, Semi-Skilled Labourer, No. 11 Maintenance Unit, RAF Chilmark, Salisbury.
- Megan Elspeth Morris, Assistant Nurse, St. Asaph General Hospital, St. Asaph.
- Peter Morris JP, Man-Train Attendant, Ifton Colliery, North Western Division, National Coal Board.
- John Charteris Murray, Chief Inspector, Metropolitan Police Force. For services to the Festival of Britain.
- Pak Chau Ng, Clerk, Grade I, RAF Kai Tak, Hong Kong.
- Grismond Lewis Nicholas, Stores Superintendent, Llanelly, South Wales Electricity Board.
- Albert Nicholds, Senior Carbonising Foreman, Foleshill Gas Works, Coventry, West Midlands Gas Board.
- Gavin Nimmo, Foreman Shipwright, Ayr Engineering & Constructional Company Ltd.
- James Albert Norman, Superintendent Foreman, Carlton Construction Company, Bexley Heath, Kent.
- Thomas O'Hara, Mechanical Maintenance Foreman, British Tabulating Machine Company Ltd., Castlereagh.
- Frank Pearce, Foreman Electrician, Troughton & Young Ltd. For services to the Festival of Britain.
- William Pearce, District Inspector, District Operating Superintendent's Office, King's Cross, Railway Executive.
- Arklie Pickersgill, Mains Superintendent, Catterick Camp, War Office.
- William John Pictor, Yard Superintendent, Command Ordnance Depot, War Office, Aldershot.
- John Poole, Site Foreman, Display Contracts, South Bank Exhibition.
- John William Portway, Leading Draughtsman, Engineering Department, General Post Office.
- Percy James Quadling, Office Keeper, Office of HM Procurator General and Treasury Solicitor.
- John Richards, Head Ambulance Man, Deep Duffryn Colliery, South Western Division, National Coal Board.
- Alfred Riddell, Chief Inspector, Head Post Office, Blackpool.
- Eleanor Nicholson Ridout, Senior Chief Supervisor, Trunk Exchange, London Telecommunications Region, General Post Office.
- Alfred William Nelson Roberts, Anti-malarial Overseer, Grade I, HM Naval Base, Singapore.
- John Atkinson Robinson JP, Checkweighman, Eden Colliery, Durham Division, National Coal Board.
- Mabel Roe, Forewoman, I. & R. Morley Ltd., Heanor, Derbyshire.
- Matthew Bayfield Rogers MM, Technician Class I, Telephone Manager's Office, Norwich.
- Samuel Hereman Sawyer, Civilian Warrant Officer, No. 418 (Conway) Squadron, Air Training Corps.
- Thomas Scamadine, Supervisor Grade I, Bad Salzuflen, Control Commission for Germany.
- Maud Aitken Scott, Headquarters Clothing Officer, Edinburgh, Women's Voluntary Services.
- Robert Edward Sergeant, Collier, Barnburgh Main Colliery, North Eastern Division, National Coal Board.
- John Seton, Drum Major, Massed Pipe Bands, Gathering of the Clans, Edinburgh. For services to the Festival of Britain.
- Ralph Cuthbert Sewell, Inspector, Yorkshire Woollen District Transport Company.
- Robert Edred Shillaw JP, Checkweighman, Weetslade Colliery, Northern (Northumberland & Cumberland) Division, National Coal Board.
- Charles William Sibley, Chief Packer, Arts Council of Great Britain for services to the Festival of Britain.
- Harry Francis Sidle, Foreign Office.
- Raymond Viliers Martin Sims, Chief Foreman, Old Oak Common Locomotive Depot, Railway Executive.
- Ernest Small, Temporary Packer and Porter, Supplies Department, General Post Office.
- Edward Tremelyn Smith, Foreman-in-Charge, Margam Works Reconstruction Gang, Steel Company of Wales.
- George Arthur Smith, Chief Inspector, Wilts & Dorset Motor Services Ltd.
- Harry Smith, General Foreman, Nelson Station, Burnley Group, North Western Gas Board.
- Lilian Alice Smith, Yarn Room Charge Hand, W.F. Pain Ltd.
- Wilfred Souter, Foreman, Henry Wiggin & Company Ltd., Birmingham.
- Alfred Starr, School Staff Instructor, Winchester College, Combined Cadet Force.
- Ernest Stevenson, Chief Stoker, Stourport "A" Power Station, Midlands Division, British Electricity Authority.
- Harry John Still, First Class Operative, Admiralty Compass Observatory.
- John Tait MM, Head Foreman Ironman, Middle Docks & Engineering Company Ltd., South Shields.
- Dorothy Taylor, Storekeeper, National Clothing Store, Women's Voluntary Services.
- Frances Taylor, Storekeeper, Regional Clothing Depot, Manchester, Women's Voluntary Services.
- George William Thwaites, Foreman Bricklayer, Dorman, Long & Company Ltd., Middlesbrough.
- William Tough, Chief Permanent Way Inspector, Newcastle District, Railway Executive.
- John Robert Tozer MM, Works Foreman, Hollacombe Manufacturing Station, Torquay & District Sub-Division, Southern Division, South Western Gas Board.
- William Trafford, Foreman Main and Service Layer, South Bank Unit of the Middlesbrough Division, Northern Gas Board.
- Allan Arthur Trotter, Superintendent, St. Hilda (South Shields) Division, St. John Ambulance Brigade.
- Frederick Troubridge, Master of the Festival of Britain River Launch MV Festival.
- Ernest Charles Tunnicliffe, General Foreman, Standard Telephones & Cables Ltd., Treforest.
- Henry Gordon Turnell, Power Station Supervisor, Tullis Russell & Company Ltd., Kirkcaldy.
- Teresa Gertrude Tutty, Senior Chief Supervisor (F), Head Post Office, Leeds.
- John M. Walker, Brass Finisher, Parkinson & Cowan (Gas Meters) Ltd. (Manchester.)
- William Stanley Walker, General Foreman, Turnhouse Airport, Ministry of Civil Aviation.
- John Thomas Warburton, Assistant Weigh Clerk & Rent Collector, Hawkins Colliery, West Midlands Division, National Coal Board.
- John Wardrope, Spare Deputy, Barbauchlaw Colliery, Scottish Division, National Coal Board.
- Herbert Gilbert Webster, Chief Engineer of the Trawler Our Bairns.
- James Charles William White, Civilian Warrant Officer, No. 275 (Nantyglo & Blaina) Squadron, Air Training Corps.
- Jack Wilkes, Foreman, Imperial Chemical Industries Ltd.
- William Wilkinson, Leading Boilermaker, Daniel Adamson & Company Ltd.
- Henry Alfred Willoughby, Scaffolder, British Museum.
- William John Wilson, Chargehand Stoker, North Western Division, British Electricity Authority.
- Horace James Woods, Civilian Instructor, No.1 School of Technical Training, RAF Halton.

==== Colonial Empire ====
- John Correia Desilva, Overseer, Mental Hospital, Bermuda.
- Neoclis Ioannou Diacos, Mukhtar of Pedhoulas village, Nicosia District, Cyprus.
- Kyriacos Melissas, Mukhtar of Ayios Theodores village, Larnaca District, Cyprus.
- Swedi Kapuku Abdallah, Head Fly-Boy, East Africa Tsetse & Trypanosomiasis Research & Reclamation Organisation, East Africa High Commission.
- Low Yew Choon, Labour Officer, Perak Secretariat, Federation of Malaya.
- Wan Man bin Haji Ismail, Field Officer, Mobile Public Address Unit, Perak, Federation of Malaya.
- Leong Nam Chew, Member, Home Guard Committee and Police Liaison Committee, Bentong, Federation of Malaya.
- Wan Abdullah bin Wan Chik, Penghulu of Mukim Telang, Pahang, Federation of Malaya.
- Mailvaganam Sabaratnam, Engineering Assistant, Public Works Department, Federation of Malaya.
- Chow Yoke Sow, Resettlement Supervisor, Selangor, Federation of Malaya.
- Lam Tek Kan, Chinese Liaison Officer, Kulai-Senai, Johore, Federation of Malaya.
- George Herbert Morris, Senior Road Foreman, Fiji.
- Hunaify Rachid Noah, Second Grade Technical Staff, Printing Office, Gambia.
- Babu Sarr, 2nd Grade Foreman, Waterworks, Public Works Department, Gambia.
- Lai Hon Kun, Postal Clerk, Grade I, Hong Kong.
- Norah Marshall-Anderson, Matron, Spanish Town Hospital, St. Catherine, Jamaica.
- Sydney Winston Bennett, General Supervisor of Reconstruction, Kingston & St. Andrew Corporation Jamaica.
- Windsor Constantine Brown, Chief Sanitary Inspector, Kingston & St. Andrew Corporation, Jamaica.
- Aloysius Beauclerc Daly, Foreman, Constant Spring Filtration Plant, Water Commission, Jamaica.
- Edith Kathleen Forbes, Acting Matron, Morant Bay Hospital, Parish of St. Thomas, Jamaica.
- Stephen Miller, Senior Warder, St. Catherine District Prison, Jamaica.
- Arthur Garland Murray, Works Overseer, Public Works Department, Jamaica.
- David Clifford Provost, Foreman, Kingston Sewage Pumping Station, Jamaica.
- Gresford Sherman, Senior Overseer, Prisons Department, Jamaica.
- Cecil Sproul, General Distribution Foreman, Jamaica Public Service Company, Jamaica.
- Marie Eveline Stephens, District Superintendent, St. John Ambulance Brigade, Jamaica.
- Arthur Vincent Surridge, Division Superintendent No.1 St. Andrew Division, St. John Ambulance Brigade, Jamaica.
- Naboth Watson, Line Foreman, Jamaica Public Service Company, Jamaica.
- Karioki s/o Richo, Chief Warder Grade I, Prison Service, Kenya.
- Muruatetu s/o Ruriga, Government Chief, Embu, Kenya.
- Antoine Gabriel Bosquet, Storekeeper, Prisons Department, Mauritius.
- Lawson Salu Tikolo, Works Foreman, Native Administration, Nigeria.
- Usang bin Submit, Headman, Murut Village of Pohun Batu, North Borneo.
- Joseph William Miller, Under-Ranger, Game & Tsetse Control Department, Northern Rhodesia.
- Richard Nyirenda, Agricultural Assistant, Agricultural Department, Northern Rhodesia.
- Sheikh Noor Abdillahi, Kadi of Borama, Somaliland Protectorate.
- Ideed Mohamed, Somali Medical Assistant, Medical Department, Somaliland Protectorate.
- Kingo Gelege, Chief of the Iramba Chiefdom, Singida District, Tanganyika.

=== Royal Red Crosses (RRC) ===
- Wing Officer Jessie Katherine Annis Browne ARRC, Princess Mary's Royal Air Force Nursing Service.
- Major Yolanda Kathleen Davey, Queen Alexandra's Royal Army Nursing Corps.

=== Associates of the Royal Red Cross (ARRC) ===
- Major Kathleen Mary Blair, Queen Alexandra's Royal Army Nursing Corps.
- Flight Officer Irene May Chapman, Princess Mary's Royal Air Force Nursing Service.
- Maureen Grace Ethel Maher-Loughnan, Superintending Sister, Queen Alexandra's Royal Naval Nursing Service.
- Margaret Kay Walshaw, Senior Nursing Sister, Queen Alexandra's Royal Naval Nursing Service.

=== Air Force Crosses (AFC) ===
Royal Navy

- Lieutenant Commander Douglas Granger Parker DSO DFC.
- Lieutenant Gilbert Bennison Newby.

Army

- Captain Oswald John Waldram, Royal Regiment of Artillery.

Royal Air Force

- Wing Commander William Pitt-Brown DFC.
- Wing Commander Ernest Neville Monkhouse Sparks DFC.
- Wing Commander John Marlow Thompson DSO DFC.
- Squadron Leader Edward William Deacon DSO DFC.
- Squadron Leader John Arthur George Jackson DFC.
- Squadron Leader John Fletcher McPhie.
- Squadron Leader Peter Lawrence Parrott DFC.
- Squadron Leader Rudolph Petrus Dreyer Potgieter.
- Squadron Leader Charles Blundell Owen DSO DFC.
- Squadron Leader Robert Sidney Radley DFC.
- Squadron Leader Arthur William Southall DSO DFC.
- Squadron Leader Harold Edward White DFC.
- Acting Squadron Leader Norman Edward Hoad.
- Acting Squadron Leader Christopher Bennett Urwin DFC.
- Flight Lieutenant Reginald William Chartres.
- Flight Lieutenant Arthur Collins DFM.
- Flight Lieutenant Gordon Douglas Cremer.
- Flight Lieutenant Joseph George Croshaw.
- Flight Lieutenant Peter Rodney Edelston DFM, Royal Auxiliary Air Force.
- Flight Lieutenant Stanley George Hewitt.
- Flight Lieutenant Kajetan Ignatowski DFM.
- Flight Lieutenant Francis Edward Lord.
- Flight Lieutenant Ronald Roy McGowan.
- Flight Lieutenant Leslaw Roman Miedzybrodzki.
- Flight Lieutenant William Kenneth Owen DFM.
- Flight Lieutenant Peter Porter.
- Flight Lieutenant Andrew Fisher Shaw.
- Flight Lieutenant Richard Cecil Shuster.
- Flight Lieutenant Kenneth Lucas Tebbutt.
- Flight Lieutenant David George Walker.
- Flight Lieutenant Billie Watford.
- Flight Lieutenant Colin Wright Watson.
- Flying Officer Alexander William Peddell.
- Flying Officer Harry Alexander Ramsey DFC.
- Master Pilot Julian Malenczuk.
- Master Signaller Trevor Nicholas Evans.

==== Air Force Crosses & Bar ====
- Wing Commander George Gordon Newman Barrett AFC

=== Air Force Medals (AFM) ===
- Flight Sergeant Joseph Bush.
- Flight Sergeant (now Master Signaller) William Charles Jenkins.
- Flight Sergeant James Moore DFM.
- Flight Sergeant Frederick Charles Bernard Penny.
- Flight Sergeant Cyril Thomas Rylatt.
- Flight Sergeant Maurice Hambrook Sloan.
- Sergeant Eric Edward Barff.
- Sergeant Edward James Darling.
- Sergeant Charles Henry Evans.
- Sergeant Alexander Mill Ford.
- Sergeant Alan Forman.
- Sergeant Frederick Charles Hicks.
- Sergeant Hew Laird Chalmers Kennedy.
- Sergeant Arthur Ramsden.
- Sergeant Anthony John Spence.

=== King's Commendations for Valuable Service in the Air ===
- Squadron Leader Robert Milham Horsley DFC.
- Squadron Leader James Lindsay Kerr.
- Squadron Leader Robert Brian Morison DFC.
- Squadron Leader Leslie George Press AFC.
- Squadron Leader Kenneth Ritchley.
- Acting Squadron Leader Michael James Beetham DFC.
- Flight Lieutenant Philip Goodrich Adams DFC.
- Flight Lieutenant William George Bartley.
- Flight Lieutenant Jeffrey James Bray DFC.
- Flight Lieutenant Albert William Donald Brazier.
- Flight Lieutenant Edward Ralph Campbell.
- Flight Lieutenant David Carlson.
- Flight Lieutenant Charles Crichton.
- Flight Lieutenant John Curd.
- Flight Lieutenant John Double DFC.
- Flight Lieutenant William Noel Gilmer.
- Flight Lieutenant Leszek Kazimierz Grzybowski.
- Flight Lieutenant William Alfred Hardman DFC.
- Flight Lieutenant Albert Walter Harding.
- Flight Lieutenant Thomas Leslie Hunt.
- Flight Lieutenant Dennis Edward King DFC.
- Flight Lieutenant Michael Mays.
- Flight Lieutenant Ronald Charles Penning.
- Flight Lieutenant Peter Hugh Percy Roberts.
- Flight Lieutenant William John Simpson DFC.
- Flight Lieutenant John Wallace Sinclair Sinclair DFC.
- Flight Lieutenant George Samuel Wilkes.
- Master Pilot John Joseph Mulrooney.
- Flight Sergeant William James Aitchison.
- Flight Sergeant James Storey Burn DFM.
- Flight Sergeant Robert Charles John Carey DFM.
- Flight Sergeant George Crossley.
- Flight Sergeant Donald James Hill.
- Flight Sergeant John James Malloy.
- Flight Sergeant Joseph Moyes.
- Flight Sergeant Desmond Witton Jack Nicholson.
- Flight Sergeant Edward Pike.
- Flight Sergeant James Ernest William Price.
- Flight Sergeant Frederick Herbert Stogdale.
- Flight Sergeant Ronald Cecil Stratton.
- Sergeant Harry Anthony Hynds.
- Sergeant Joseph Charles Wellby.

=== The King's Police & Fire Services Medals ===
==== Police ====
England & Wales

- George Spencer Jackson OBE, Chief Constable, Newcastle upon Tyne Police Force.
- Donald Lockett, Chief Constable, Tynemouth Borough Police Force.
- Major Lionel Westropp Peel Yates, Chief Constable, Dorset Constabulary.
- Joseph Simpson OBE, Chief Constable, Surrey Constabulary.
- Colonel Arthur Edwin Young, Commissioner of Police for The City of London.
- Robert Frank Nixon OBE, Assistant Chief Constable, Wiltshire Constabulary.
- Willie Parnham MBE, Assistant Chief Constable, City of Sheffield Police Force.
- Charles John Broughton, Chief Superintendent, Kent County Constabulary.
- William Edward Collins, Superintendent, Gateshead Borough Police Force.
- Henry Sylvester Gould DCM MM, Superintendent, Metropolitan Police.
- Alfred Hodgson, Superintendent and Deputy Chief Constable, Bolton Borough Police Force.
- Leonard Charles Pyke, Chief Inspector, Metropolitan Police.

Scotland

- Gathorne Hardy Cheyne BEM, Chief Constable, Orkney Constabulary.
- Andrew Meldrum, Chief Constable, Angus Constabulary.

Northern Ireland

- Francis Thornton, Detective Head Constable, Royal Ulster Constabulary.

Australia

- Launcelot Charles Beck, Superintendent, New South Wales Police Force.
- Charles Edmund Godwin, Superintendent, New South Wales Police Force.
- Charles Garnet Grimes, Inspector, New South Wales Police Force.
- John Henry Jennings Magnay, Superintendent, New South Wales Police Force.
- Walter Edwin Salmon, Superintendent, New South Wales Police Force.

Southern Rhodesia

- Captain Sydney Edward Collings, late Superintendent, British South Africa Police.
- Sydney George Kilborn CPM, late Chief Inspector, British South Africa Police.

Colonies, Protectorates & Protected States

- Charles Nevill Godwin, Superintendent of Police, Federation of Malaya.
- Kenneth Tom Meredith Holmes CPM, Senior Superintendent of Police, Kenya.
- Eric Bertram Humfrey CPM, Assistant Commissioner of Police, Cyprus.
- Colonel John Edward Workman, Commissioner of Police, Northern Rhodesia.

==== Fire Service ====
- Thomas Bruce GM, Chief Officer, Sunderland Fire Brigade.
- John Leslie Johnson, Chief Officer, Portsmouth Fire Brigade.
- Oliver Henry Bengough Leek, Chief Officer, Breconshire & Radnorshire Fire Brigade.
- Martin Chadwick OBE, Firemaster, Glasgow Fire Brigade.
- Thomas John Gordon Morton, District Officer, Belfast Fire Brigade.

=== Colonial Police Medals (Malaya, Singapore & Jamaica) ===
- Mohamed Ariff bin Darus, Assistant Superintendent, Federation of Malaya Police Force.
- Peter Charles Eric Bjorkman DCM MM, Police Lieutenant, Federation of Malaya Police Force.
- Richard Maynard Dudley Buxton, Cadet, Federation of Malaya Police Force.
- Charles Haddon-Cave, Honorary Inspector, Auxiliary Police, Federation of Malaya.
- Alfred William Crofts, Director of Music, Federation of Malaya Police Force.
- Sydney Constantine Davis, First Class Constable, Jamaica Constabulary.
- Ernest Edward De Val, Assistant Superintendent, Federation of Malaya Police Force.
- Harry Kenneth Dimoline CBE DSO TD, Honorary Superintendent, Auxiliary Police, Federation of Malaya.
- Vaughan William Powell-Evans, Superintendent, Federation of Malaya Police Force.
- Andrew Howat Frew, Assistant Superintendent, Singapore Police Force.
- William James Hillier, Assistant Superintendent, Federation of Malaya Police Force.
- William Samuel Howard, Sergeant of Police, Jamaica Constabulary.
- Wan Ibrahim bin Wan Mohamed Isa, Assistant Superintendent, Federation of Malaya Police Force.
- Cecil Maurice John Kirke, Superintendent, Federation of Malaya Police Force.
- Roy Kirkpatrick, Honorary Assistant Superintendent, Auxiliary Police, Federation of Malaya.
- Henry Frances de Camborne Lucy, Honorary Inspector, Auxiliary Police, Federation of Malaya.
- Thomas Pirie MacIntyre, Police Lieutenant, Federation of Malaya Police Force.
- Guy Charles Madoc, Superintendent, Federation of Malaya Police Force.
- Jack Briscoe Masefield, Superintendent, Federation of Malaya Police Force.
- Arthur William Melton, Superintendent, Federation of Malaya Police Force.
- Frederick George Minns, Assistant Superintendent, Singapore Police Force.
- Walter Robert Alexander Morford, Police Lieutenant, Federation of Malaya Police Force.
- Edward Morrow, Assistant Superintendent, Federation of Malaya Police Force.
- Mohamed Natt bin Haji Mohamed Yusoff, Assistant Superintendent, Federation of Malaya Police Force.
- Desmond Bernard Newman, Honorary Inspector, Auxiliary Police, Federation of Malaya.
- Othman bin Mohamed Hassan, Sergeant, Federation of Malaya Police Force.
- Hugh Victor Puckridge, Honorary Inspector, Auxiliary Police, Federation of Malaya.
- Alex George Rodgers, Honorary Inspector, Auxiliary Police, Federation of Malaya.
- Too Joon Hing, Honorary Assistant Superintendent, Auxiliary Police, Federation of Malaya.
- Tsiakeng Nam, Inspector, Federation of Malaya Police Force.
- Abdul Wahab bin Haji Din, Special Constabulary Sergeant, Federation of Malaya.
- Tenku Mohamed Yusof ibni Sultan Mohamed IV, Assistant Superintendent, Federation of Malaya Police Force.

=== Mentions in Despatches ===
In recognition of Operational Minesweeping and Bomb and Mine Disposal services.

Royal Navy

- Lieutenant John Dickinson.
- Petty Officer Robert Gribben GM.
- Chief Petty Officer Stoker Mechanic Henry John Lutman.
- Petty Officer Raymond Victor Simmons.

== Australia ==
=== Knights Bachelor ===
- John Deals Chandler. For public services.
- The Honourable Colin George Watt Davidson. For services to the coal industry.

=== Order of the Bath (Military) ===
==== Companions ====
- Major-General Leslie Beavis CBE DSO.

=== Order of St Michael & St George ===
==== Companions ====
- Norman John Carson, Acting Chairman of the Australian Wool Realisation Commission.

=== Order of the British Empire (Military) ===
==== Knights Commander ====
- Major-General Roy Burston CB CBE DSO VD FRACP, (now Retired).

==== Commanders ====
Royal Australian Navy

- Surgeon Captain Denis Adrian Pritchard FRACP .

Australian Army

- Brigadier Stanley Ferguson Legge.

Royal Australian Air Force

- Air Commodore Edward Alfred Daley FRACP .

==== Officers ====
Royal Australian Navy

- Acting Captain Franklyn Bryce Morris ADC.

Australian Army

- Lieutenant-Colonel (Temporary) Cecil Ives, Royal Australian Armoured Corps.
- Major John Robertson Nimmo, Royal Australian Army Medical Corps.
- Lieutenant-Colonel Gordon Arthur McLintock Searle.

Royal Australian Air Force

- Group Captain Charles Douglas Candy ADC.
- Wing Commander William Dobson Richmond.

==== Members ====
Royal Australian Navy

- Wardmaster Lieutenant Jack Levy.
- Mr. Thomas Westray Toop, Senior Commissioned Instructor.

Australian Army

- Warrant Officer Class II Edward James Dadd, Royal Australian Armoured Corps.
- Captain Vincent Joseph Donnelly.
- Lieutenant Bruce Fletcher, Royal Australian Engineers.
- Warrant Officer Class II James William Fyfe, Royal Australian Artillery.
- Captain Denis Day George, Royal Australian Corps of Signals.
- Major (Temporary) Walter Alan Lowrey, Royal Australian Engineers.
- Captain Keith Douglas Nevile, Royal Australian Engineers.

Royal Australian Air Force

- Flight Lieutenant William Randolph Alexander.
- Warrant Officer Harry Barlow.
- Warrant Officer Ernest Alfred Mattock.

=== Order Of The British Empire (Civil) ===
==== Knights Commander ====
- The Honourable William Raymond Kelly, Chief Justice of the Commonwealth Arbitration Court.
- The Honourable Thomas Walter White DFC VD, High Commissioner in the United Kingdom for His Majesty's Government in the Commonwealth of Australia.

==== Commanders ====
- Lionel Batley Bull DVSc. For services to veterinary science.
- Samuel Fergus Ferguson, Director of the Australian Association of British Manufacturers. For services to the promotion of trade between Australia and the United Kingdom.
- Frank Roy Sinclair, Secretary, Department of the Army.

==== Officers ====
- William Adrian Brennan. For services to journalism.
- John Harris, Federal President of the Limbless Soldiers' Association.
- Mabel Mary Hailes Lush. For services to pre-school education.
- John Kinmont Moir. For services to art and literature.
- Gladys Moncrieff. For services to patriotic and charitable movements.

==== Members ====
- Dorothy Lilly Beale, Sister-in-Charge of the Methodist Hospital, Kimidan, New Ireland.
- Winifred May Brennan. For services to patriotic organisations, especially the Australian Comforts Fund.
- Frederic Harold Buss. For services to the Australian Comforts Fund.
- Sybilla Schmitz (Sister Marie Clematia), Sister-in-Charge of the Roman Catholic Leprosarium, Anelaua, New Ireland.
- Hilda Minna Eaton. For social welfare services.
- Michael James Leahy, of Zenag, New Guinea. For services in connection with the development of the territory's resources.
- Louis James Michel. For services to ex-servicemen.
- Charles Eric Munro. For services to the Australian Comforts Fund.
- Maurice Gabriel Sloman. For services to the Australian Comforts Fund.
- Florence Marion Windeyer. For public and charitable services.

=== British Empire Medals (Military Division) ===
Royal Australian Navy

- Engine Room Artificer Third Class Neville Ashmore.
- Able Seaman Victor William Turner.

Australian Army

- Warrant Officer Class II (Temporary) George William Adderton, Royal Australian Army Medical Corps.
- Warrant Officer Class II (Temporary) James Anderson, Royal Australian Corps of Signals, in recognition of non-operational services in Japan in connection with operations in Korea.
- Sergeant (Temporary) Henry Walter Bryant, Royal Australian Infantry Corps.
- Sergeant (Temporary) Leonard Walter Evans, Australian Military Forces.
- Warrant Officer Class II (Temporary) Guy Philip Messingham Harvey, Royal Australian Army Service Corps.
- Sergeant (Temporary) Herbert Lawrence Leech, Royal Australian Army Service Corps.
- Sergeant Norman McLeod, Royal Australian Army Service Corps.
- Sergeant Alfred John Walker, Commonwealth Military Forces.

Royal Australian Air Force

- Sergeant Thomas Samuel Maddock.

=== British Empire Medals (Civil Division) ===
- William Ferguson. For services to cricket.

=== Royal Red Crosses ===
- Major (Temporary Lieutenant-Colonel) Lucy Hamnett Edwards, Royal Australian Army Nursing Corps.

=== Associates of the Royal Red Cross ===
- Lieutenant (Temporary Captain) Constance Adelaide Judd, Royal Australian Army Nursing Corps.
- Senior Sister Lucy Eyrie Rule, Royal Australian Air Force Nursing Service.

=== Air Force Crosses ===
- Wing Commander Jack Dowling.
- Wing Commander Geoffrey Douglas Marshall.
- Squadron Leader Roy Carlin.
- Squadron Leader Alan Robert Hodge.
- Flight Lieutenant Victor Douglas Guthrie.
- Flight Lieutenant Max Holdsworth.
- Flight Lieutenant Arthur Edward Lynch McKenzie.

=== Air Force Medals ===
- Corporal William Robert Kimber.

=== King's Commendations for Valuable Service in the Air ===
- Flight Lieutenant Thomas Stanley Judd.

== Ceylon ==
=== Knights Bachelor ===
- Velupillai Coomaraswamy CMG, Deputy High Commissioner for Ceylon in the United Kingdom.
- Lalitha Abhaya Rajapakse KC, Minister of Justice.

=== Order of St Michael & St George ===
==== Companions ====
- Edward Frederick Noel Gratiaen KC, Puisne Judge of the Supreme Court.
- William Arthur Edward Karunaratne OBE, Professor of Pathology, University of Ceylon.

=== Order of the British Empire (Civil Division) ===
==== Commanders ====
- James Aubrey Martensz, High Commissioner for Ceylon in Australia.
- Kenneth Morford, Manager, Mount Vernon Estate, Kotagala. For services to the tea industry.
- Senarath Paranavithana OBE, Archaeological Commissioner.

==== Officers ====
- Kurbanhusen Adamaly. For public and commercial services.
- Oliver Gerard D'Alwis. For social services in Kalutara.
- Egodage Richard De Silva, Principal, Richmond College, Galle.
- Warusahennedige Daniel Fernando MBE. For charitable and commercial services.
- Martin Arthur Wimala Goonesekera, lately Proctor of the Supreme Court.
- Hugh Theodore Rosslyn Koch MP. For services to the export trade.
- Senaipathige Theobald Philip Rodrigo, Senator. For social services in Colombo.
- Victor Emmanuel Perera Seneviratne, visiting Physician, General Hospital, Colombo.
- Rajakaruna Ekanayake Wasala Mudiyanse Ralahamilage Ukku Banda Unamboowe. For agricultural services in Kotmale.

==== Members ====
- Mannamarakkalage Venentius Edward Peter Cooray, Chairman of the Town Council, Wadduwa.
- Allan Bertram Demmer, Operating Superintendent, Ceylon Government Railway.
- Meerakuddy Mohamed Ebrahim MP. For public service in Pottuvil.
- Wilfred Gunasekera, Proctor, Matara.
- Don Johannes Kumarage, Principal, Rahula College, Matara.
- Lionel William Ratuwatte Kuruppu. Chairman, Panadura and Talpiti Baddas Village Committee.
- Segu Ismail Lebbe Marikar Abdul Caflfoor Marikar-Hadjiar. For social service in Kalutara.
- Bamunuaracihdhige Don Rampala, Chief Mechanical Engineer, Ceylon Government Railway.
- Margaret Jane Rhind Reid. For social services.
- V. Veerasingam, lately Principal, Hindu College, Manipay.
- Ramalingam Sivagurunather, Proctor & Notary, Jaffna.
- Elsie Ethel Winifred Solomons, District Inspector of Schools, Western Province.

=== King's Police and Fire Services Medals for Distinguished Service ===
- Erroll Alexander Koelmeyer MBE, Superintendent of Police, Criminal Investigation Department.

== Pakistan ==
=== Knights Bachelor ===
- Arthur Jules Dash CIE, lately Chairman, Public Service Commission, East Bengal.
- Eric de Vere Moss CIE, lately Secretary, Ministry of Health and Works.

=== Order of the British Empire (Military Division) ===
==== Knights Commander ====
- Lieutenant-General (Acting) Ross Cairns McCay CB CBE DSO, Special List (ex-Indian Army).

==== Commanders ====
- Brigadier (Temporary) Reginald Morley DSO MC, late Royal Regiment of Artillery.

==== Officers ====
- Lieutenant-Colonel (Temporary) Cecil Raymond Scott Daly, Special List (ex-Indian Army).

=== Order of the British Empire (Civil Division) ===
==== Knights Commander ====
- Alexander MacFarquhar CIE, Secretary, Ministry of Commerce and Education.

==== Commanders ====
- Lieutenant-Colonel Edward Walter Fletcher, lately Deputy Secretary, Ministry of Foreign Affairs and Commonwealth Relations.
- Major Richard Kenneth Maitland Saker, Revenue and Judicial Commissioner, Baluchistan.

==== Officers ====
- Lieutenant-Colonel Edward George Montgomery, Surgeon-General, East Bengal.
- Owen Charles Rickett, lately Chief Engineer and Secretary to the Government, North West Frontier Province.
- William Leonard O'Brien Stallard, Deputy Director, Intelligence Bureau.

==== Members ====
- Francis John Green, Consulting Engineer to the Chittagong Port Commissioners.
- James Burke O'Leary, lately Armament Supply Officer, Royal Pakistan Navy.
- Donald Vernon Sladen, lately Armament Supply Officer, Royal Pakistan Navy.
