= SS Gasfire =

British Steam Collier

History

United Kingdom
- Name: Gasfire
- Owner: Gas Light and Coke Company
- Operator: Stephenson, Clarke & Assoc Cos
- Port of registry: (United Kingdom) London
- Route: Tyneside — London
- Builder: SP Austin & Son, Ltd, Sunderland
- Yard number: 338
- Completed: October 1936
- Identification: UK official number 164730; Call sign GZCT
- Fate: Sunk by mine, 21 June 1941

General characteristics
- Tonnage: 1936–40: 2,972 GRT; tonnage under deck 2,268; 1,747 NRT; 1940–41: 3,001 GRT; tonnage under deck 2,269; 1,753 NRT
- Length: 318.4 ft (97.0 m)
- Beam: 45.7 ft (13.9 m)
- Draught: 19 ft 10 1/2 in (6.06 m)
- Depth: 20.0 ft (6.1 m)
- Installed power: 259 NHP
- Propulsion: 3-cylinder triple-expansion engine; single screw
- Armament: (as DEMS)
- Notes: sister ship: Mr. Therm

SS Gasfire was a British steam collier of the Gas Light and Coke Company (GLCC). She was built in Sunderland in 1936, survived severe damage from being torpedoed in 1940 and was sunk by a mine in the North Sea in 1941.

== Building and peacetime service ==
In 1936 SP Austin & Son, Ltd at Sunderland on the River Wear built a pair of colliers for the GLCC, completing Mr. Therm in May and her sister ship Gasfire in October. At more than 2,970 GRT each, they were as large as many ocean-going cargo ships, but they were built for a North Sea coastal route, bringing coal from the Great Northern Coalfield of North East England to the GLCC's Beckton Gas Works on the River Thames.

Gasfire had six corrugated furnaces with a combined grate area of 82 square feet (8 m^{2}) that heated two single-ended boilers with a combined heating surface of 3,732 square feet (347 m^{2}). These fed steam at 200 lb_{f}/in^{2} to a three-cylinder triple expansion steam engine built by North East Marine Engineering Co of Newcastle upon Tyne. The engine was rated at 259 NHP and drove a single screw.

The GLCC contracted management of the two ships to Stephenson, Clarke and Associated Companies, which had managed all of the GLCC fleet since before the First World War.

== Wartime service ==
In the Second World War, Kriegsmarine E-boats and U-boats attacked British coastal shipping both by torpedo and by minelaying. Most coasters were slow ships built for economy, and thus easy targets. They were therefore organised into convoys, but at first these had few escorts and scant Defensively Equipped Merchant Ship armament. Gasfire sailed in FN and FS series convoys, which stood for "Forth North" and "Forth South". FN convoys assembled off Southend-on-Sea and sailed to Methil on the Firth of Forth; FS convoys did the reverse. From January to October 1940 Gasfire made up to three round trips a month between Beckton and the Tyne, leaving each FN convoy and joining each FS convoy off the Tyne Estuary.

=== Damaged and repaired ===
On 17 October 1940 Gasfire left Southend with Convoy FN 11. E-boats tended to attack off the coast of East Anglia, in a stretch of sea that British seafarers nicknamed "E-boat Alley". That day 6 nautical miles (11 km) north north east of Smith's Knoll off Great Yarmouth an E-boat flotilla consisting of S-18, S-24 and S-27 attacked FN 11. S-18 sank the coaster Hauxley and S-24 sank the French ship P.L.M. 14. A torpedo fired by S-27 blew off Gasfire's stern, disabling her and killing 11 crew, but she remained afloat. She was beached at Spurn Head at the mouth of the Humber, and then towed north to the River Wear. There her builder, SP Austin, lifted her out of the water on its pontoon, removed the damage and built a new stern onto her. The repair slightly increased each of her tonnages.

=== Final voyage and loss ===
Approximate position of Gasfire's wreck

Gasfire returned to service on 3 May 1941. On 21 June she left Southend for the Tyne, sailing with Convoy EC 36 which would continue around Cape Wrath to Oban. Later that day, 11 nautical miles (20 km) east of Southwold, she struck a mine and sank in the North Sea 10 nautical miles (19 km) east of Southwold, Suffolk (52°19′N 1°59′E). All 26 crew were rescued.

A donkeyman (i.e. crewman in charge of a donkey engine) from Gasfire's crew, T.A. Umpleby, was awarded the King's Commendation for Brave Conduct and Lloyd's War Medal for Bravery at Sea.

== See also ==
- SS Wandle, a Wandsworth and District Gas Company flatiron collier that survived an E-boat blowing her bow off in 1942
