= Ardingly (disambiguation) =

Ardingly may refer to:

- Ardingly, a village and civil parish in West Sussex, England,
- Ardingly College, an independent school in the parish of Ardingly,
- Ardingly railway station, which formerly served the village and college,
- Ardingly, a Southern Railway Schools class railway steam locomotive named after the college,
- MV Ardingly, a Stephenson Clarke coastal collier ship.
