= SS Wandle (1932) =

British coastal collier owned by Wandsworth gas works

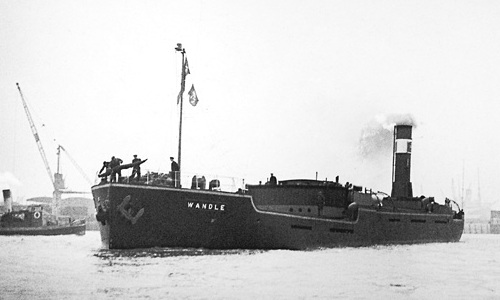
- Wandle steams up the River Thames on her maiden voyage, 30 October 1932

History

United Kingdom
- Name: Wandle
- Namesake: River Wandle, South London
- Owner: Wandsworth and District Gas Company (1932–49); South Eastern Gas Board (1949–59)
- Operator: Wandsworth and District Gas Company (1932–49); South Eastern Gas Board (1949–59)
- Port of registry: (United Kingdom) London
- Route: North East England to Wandsworth
- Builder: Burntisland Shipbuilding Company
- Yard number: 173
- Launched: 29 September 1932
- Completed: October 1932
- Maiden voyage: 30 October 1932
- Identification: UK official number 163297; Code Letters LHVD; Call sign MKBB
- Fate: Scrapped 1959

General characteristics
- Type: flat-iron collier
- Tonnage: 1,482 GRT; tonnage under deck 1,158; 796 net register tons; 2,330 deadweight tons
- Length: 236 ft (71.9 m)
- Beam: 38 ft (11.6 m)
- Draught: 16 ft 0 1/4 in (4.9 m)
- Depth: 16.5 ft (5.0 m)
- Installed power: 164 NHP
- Propulsion: 3-cylinder triple expansion steam engine built by North Eastern Marine Engineering; single screw
- Armament: as DEMS: 1 × 12 pounder gun; 2 × Lewis guns; 1 × Hotchkiss gun

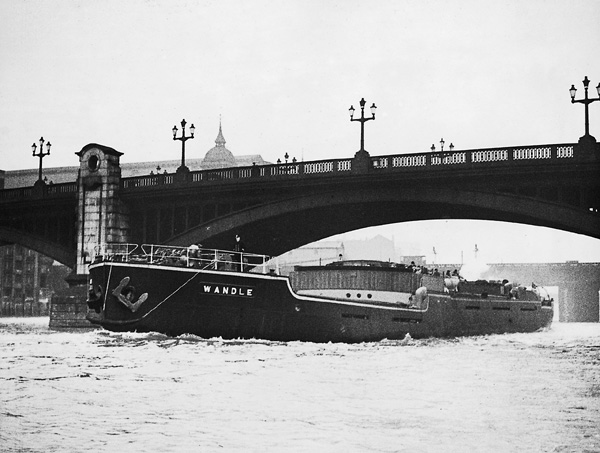
Wandle on her maiden voyage, 30 October 1932, on the Thames under Southwark Bridge. Her mast, funnel and wheelhouse are folded flat to pass under the bridge

SS Wandle was a British coastal collier owned and operated by the proprietors of Wandsworth gas works in south-west London. She was a flatiron, meaning that she had a low-profile superstructure, hinged funnel, hinged or telescopic mast and folding wheelhouse to enable her to pass under low bridges on the tidal River Thames upriver from the Pool of London. She was in service from 1932 to 1959 and survived a number of enemy attacks in the Second World War.

== Namesakes ==
SS Wandle was named after the River Wandle, which flows through much of district that Wandsworth gas works then served and joins the Thames at Wandsworth near the company's gas works and headquarters. She was the third flatiron of the same name in the service of the same owners. The first was built in 1909 and survived an engagement with a U-boat in 1916. The second was built in 1922 and sold to Stephenson Clarke and Associates in 1932.

In the Second World War Wandle's Master was G.A.W. Mastin, whose father G.E.A. Mastin had commanded the first SS Wandle when she repulsed a U-boat attack in 1916.

== Building and civilian service ==
The Burntisland Shipbuilding Company of Burntisland on the Firth of Forth in Fife, Scotland, built Wandle in 1932 for the Wandsworth and District Gas Company. She had four corrugated furnaces with a combined grate area of 66 square feet (6 m^{2}) that heated one single-ended boiler with a heating surface of 2,850 square feet (265 m^{2}). This fed steam at 200 lb_{f}/in^{2} to a three-cylinder triple expansion steam engine built by North East Marine Engineering Co of Newcastle upon Tyne. The engine was rated at 164 NHP and drove a single screw.

She carried coal from ports in North East England down the North Sea coast and up the Thames to the gas works at Wandsworth in south-west London. She had capacity for a cargo of up to 2,200 long tons of coal.

== War service ==
In the Second World War Wandle travelled laden in FS-series convoys southwards as far as Southend and in ballast in FN-series or EC-series convoys from Southend northwards. When the UK armed its merchant ships she was fitted with one 12-pounder gun, two Lewis guns and a Hotchkiss gun.

=== Sea and air attacks ===
During air attacks on 13 and 31 August 1940, Wandle succeeded in hitting enemy aircraft. On the latter occasion a fire started on her degaussing cable but her engineers repaired the cable enabling her to pass through a heavily mined area.

On 23 March 1941 in the North Sea an E-boat attacked her with rapid gunfire but Wandle's Mate, Edward Clarke, returned fire with the 12-pounder and with his sixth shot disabled the E-boat's gun and repulsed the attack.

At 2340 hrs on 11 June 1941 enemy aircraft torpedoed and sank the 2,056 GRT coaster SS Moorwood. Wandle's Mate recovered a man who had been blown overboard from Moorwood into the sea; then the Mate and Wandle's crew picked up the remainder from Moorwood's lifeboat.

During an air attack on 20 September 1941, Wandle fired at enemy aircraft and succeeded in damaging one. On 24 October during an attack off the east coast of Norfolk she returned fire and "probably" hit an enemy E-boat.

In April 1942 Captain Mastin was awarded the OBE and Edward Clarke was awarded the MBE for the fine defence of their ship.

=== Torpedoing and salvage ===
At 2125 hrs on 9 November 1942 Wandle was in ballast heading northwards off Lowestoft when a flotilla of E-boats attacked her convoy. A torpedo struck her starboard side about 20 feet (6 m) forward of her bridge. It almost completely blew off her bow, and flung débris so far that it killed a Royal Artillery Maritime Regiment DEMS gunner in the aft part of the ship. After 20 minutes her crew launched both lifeboats and abandoned ship. A rescue tug recovered the survivors and then went to recover survivors from another ship that had been sunk. After this Wandle was still afloat but she was on fire, her below decks accommodation was flooded, her fore part awash and her no. 2 hold taking water.

Captain Mastin assembled a volunteer crew of nine men including himself and the Mate Edward Clarke. They reboarded the ship and extinguished the fire, and a party directed by the Chief Engineer J.S. Johnson got her dynamo and pumps started. The rescue tug took her in tow, but her ruined bow was still attached which worked as a large and unwieldy sea anchor. This limited their progress to about 1 knot (2 km/h), and it took the tug 16 hours to tow Wandle to Great Yarmouth the next day. She was anchored off Yarmouth and her condition was deemed so precarious that she was abandoned a second time.

An Admiralty salvage officer came aboard and cut away several hundred tons of wreckage. This relieved the strain on her bulkhead, which was then patched and shored up with heavy timbers. She was towed into Yarmouth for a few hours but was then towed north again by two tugs. A northerly gale arose and swung her about violently, and she was often awash. The tugs and Wandle sheltered in the Humber to escape heavy seas and in a bay to wait for fog to pass. On the fifth day after being torpedoed, Wandle finally reached the River Tyne. On 5 December she was dry-docked at John Readhead & Sons' shipyard in South Shields. During this whole period of salvage and towing, the volunteer crew led by Captain George Mastin, Mate Edward Clarke and Engineer "Stanley" Johnson, remained with the Wandle, until she was safely docked at Redheads, to ensure no salvage claims were made on the owners.

Wandle had not only lost her bow; what remained of her was now badly twisted. Readheads straightened her, built a new bow onto her and on either 30 March or 8 April 1943 she was ready to return to service.

== Final years ==
In 1949 the Wandsworth and District Gas Company was nationalised and became part of the new South Eastern Gas Board. Wandle became part of the SEGB fleet and remained in service until 1959. A Dutch tug then towed her across the North Sea to Rotterdam, where she arrived on 3 November 1959 to be scrapped.

== See also ==
- SS Gasfire, a Gas Light and Coke Company collier that survived an E-boat blowing her stern off in 1940

== Sources ==
- Central Office of Information; Ministry of Transport (1947). British Coaster: The Official Story. London: His Majesty's Stationery Office. pp. 53–56.
- anonymous (1948). John Readhead & Sons Limited, Shipbuilders Shiprepairers Engine and Boiler Builders. South Shields: John Readhead & Sons. pp. not numbered. The book includes a two-page spread showing four photos of Wandle: one at sea after being torpedoed and three in Readheads' dry dock. The three photos in dry dock show her before and after her damaged bow was cut away, and after her hull had been straightened and rebuilt.
