= British Gas =

Energy and home services provider in the United Kingdom

British Gas Trading Limited
- Type: Limited company (subsidiary of Centrica)
- Industry: Utilities
- Predecessor: 1812 (as the Gas Light and Coke Company); 1948 (as the area gas boards); 1973 (as the British Gas Corporation); 1986 (as British Gas plc)
- Founded: February 1997 (as a subsidiary of Centrica)
- Headquarters: Staines-upon-Thames, England, United Kingdom
- Area served: United Kingdom
- Key people: Chris O'Shea (Chief Executive, Centrica Consumer); Matthew Bateman (Managing Director, UK Home)
- Products: Gas; Electricity; Boilers and central heating Plumbing and drains Renewable energy Home appliance services
- Parent: HM Government (1948–1986); Centrica (1997–present)
- Website: www.britishgas.co.uk

British Gas (trading as Scottish Gas in Scotland) is an energy and home services provider in the United Kingdom. It is the trading name of British Gas Trading Limited, British Gas Services Limited, British Gas Services (Commercial) Limited, British Gas New Heating Limited and British Gas Insurance Limited, all of which are subsidiaries of Centrica. Serving around ten million homes in the United Kingdom, British Gas was the largest electricity supplier in the country until 2024 when it was overtaken by Octopus Energy. It remains the largest gas supplier. It is considered one of the Big Six dominating the gas and electricity market in the United Kingdom.

== History ==
=== 1812–1948 ===
The Gas Light and Coke Company was the first public utility company in the world. It was founded by Frederick Albert Winsor and incorporated by royal charter on 30 April 1812.

It continued to thrive for the next 136 years, expanding into domestic services whilst absorbing many smaller companies including the Aldgate Gas Light and Coke Company (1819), the City of London Gas Light and Coke Company (1870), the Equitable Gas Light Company (1871), the Great Central Gas Consumer's Company (1870), Victoria Docks Gas Company (1871), Western Gas Light Company (1873), Imperial Gas Light and Coke Company (1876), Independent Gas Light and Coke Company (1876), the London Gas Light Company (1883), Richmond Gas Company (1925), Brentford Gas Company (1926), Pinner Gas Company (1930) and Southend-on-Sea and District Gas Company (1932).

On 1 May 1949, the GLCC became the major part of the new North Thames Gas Board, one of Britain's twelve regional gas boards after the passing of the Gas Act 1948 by Clement Attlee's post-war Labour government.

=== 1948–1973 ===
In the beginning of the 1900s, the gas market in the United Kingdom was mainly run by county councils and small private firms. At this time the use of a flammable gas (often known as "town gas") piped to houses as a fuel was still being marketed to consumers, by such means as the National Gas Congress and Exhibition in 1913. The gas used in the 19th and early 20th centuries was coal gas, but in the period of 1967–77, British domestic coal gas supplies were replaced by natural gas.

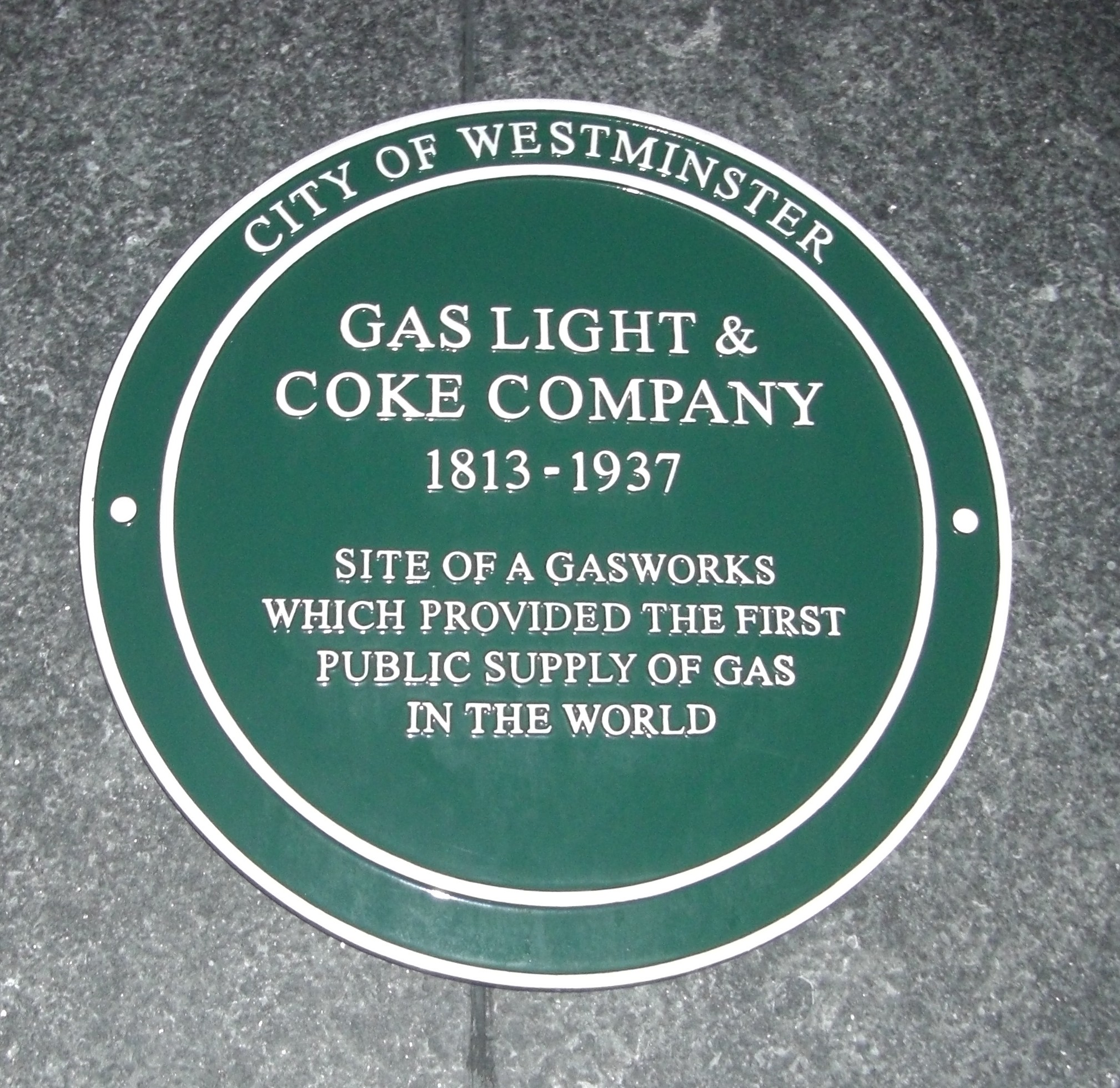
Commemorative plaque in Great Peter Street

In 1948, Clement Attlee's Labour government reshaped the gas industry, bringing in the Gas Act 1948. The act (on the vesting date of 1 April 1949) nationalised the gas industry in the United Kingdom and 1,062 privately owned and municipal gas companies were merged into twelve area gas boards, each a separate body with its own management structure.

The twelve gas boards were: Eastern, East Midlands, Northern, North Eastern, North Thames, North West, Scottish, Southern, South Eastern, South Western, Wales, and West Midlands. Each area board was divided into geographical groups or divisions which were often further divided into smaller districts. These boards simply became known as the "gas board", a term still sometimes used when referring to British Gas.

In addition, the Gas Act 1948 established the Gas Council, its constitution was such that control lay effectively with the area boards. The council consisted of a chairman and deputy chairman, both appointed by the minister, and the chairmen of each of the twelve area boards. The council served as a channel of communication with the minister; undertook labour negotiations; undertook research; and acted as spokesperson for the gas industry generally.

The Gas Act 1965 shifted the balance of power to the centre: it put the Gas Council on the same footing as the area boards, with the powers to borrow up to £900 million, to manufacture or acquire gas and to supply gas in bulk to any area board. In May 1968, the Gas Council moved to large new offices at 59 Bryanston Street, Marble Arch, London.

=== 1973–1986 ===
In the beginning of the 1970s, the gas industry was again restructured after the Gas Act 1972 was passed. The act merged all the area boards, created the British Gas Corporation and abolished the Gas Council.

From its inception, the corporation was responsible for development and maintenance of the supply of gas to Great Britain, in addition to satisfying reasonable demand for gas throughout the country. Its leadership, like that of the area boards, was appointed and supervised by the Secretary of State for Trade and Industry until 1974, when those powers were vested in the newly created position of Secretary of State for Energy.

=== 1986–1997 ===
The Conservative Government, led by Prime Minister Margaret Thatcher introduced the Gas Act 1986, which led to the privatisation of the company, and on 8 December 1986, its shares floated on the London stock market. To encourage individuals to become shareholders, the offer was intensely advertised with the "If you see Sid...Tell him!" campaign. The privatisation was criticised by Baron Gray of Contin who said it broke a key part of the Conservative's 1983 manifesto that the party would not simply replace one monopoly with another; at the time, British Gas was the only organisation that could supply gas to anyone in the country.

=== 1997–2020 ===
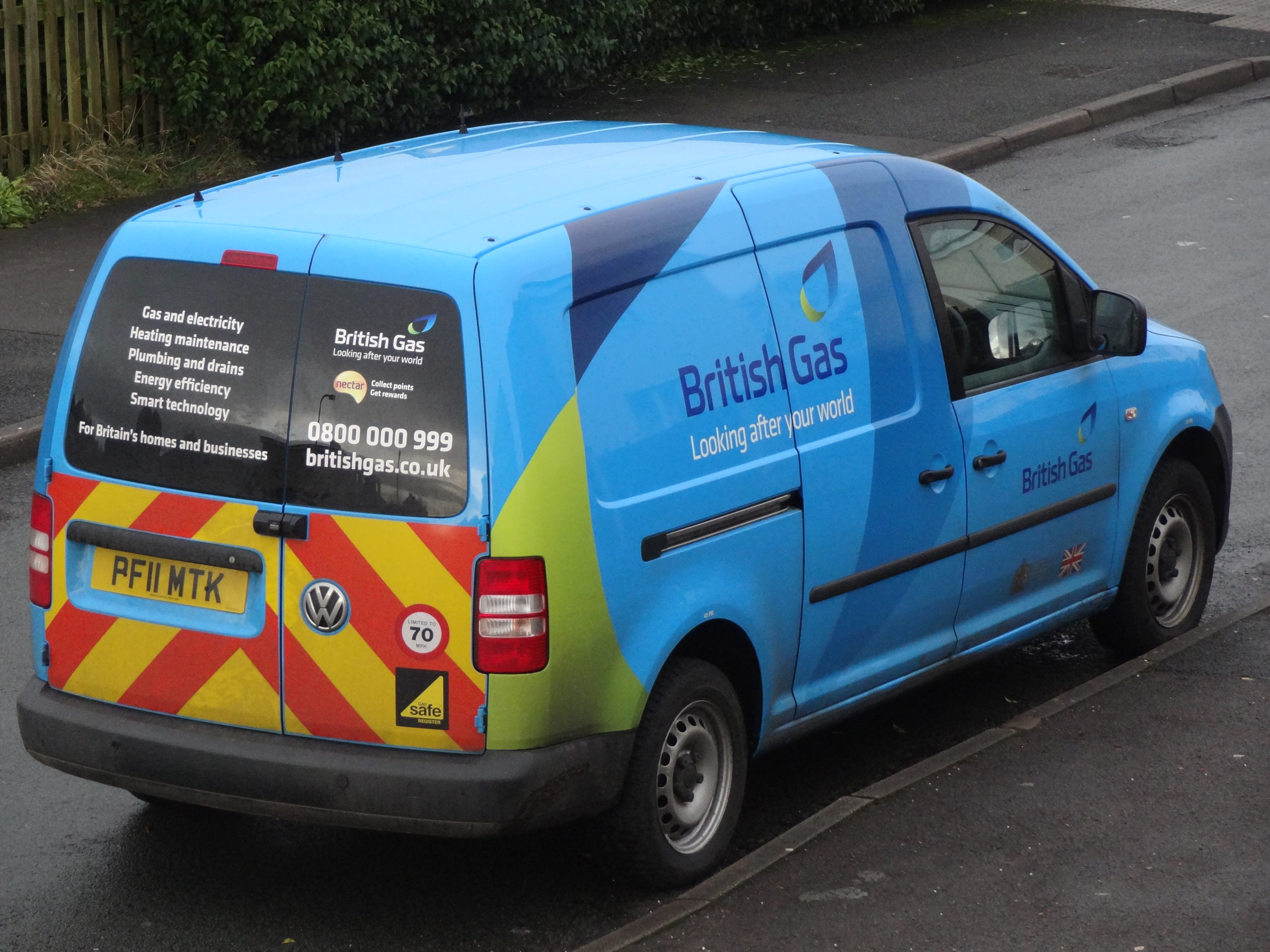
A newly designed British Gas van (2013)

In February 1997, eleven years after it had been privatised, British Gas plc demerged to become the entirely separate BG Group and the Gas Sales and Gas Trading, Services and Retail businesses.

The Gas Sales and Gas Trading and Services and Retail businesses, together with the gas production business of the North and South Morecambe gas fields, were transferred to Centrica, which continues to own and operate the British Gas retail brand.

British Gas acquired Dyno-Rod in October 2004. In April 2016, it was announced that 224,000 residential customers had left the company, citing customers coming to the end of their fixed deals and then moving on to other suppliers as the main reason for this loss.

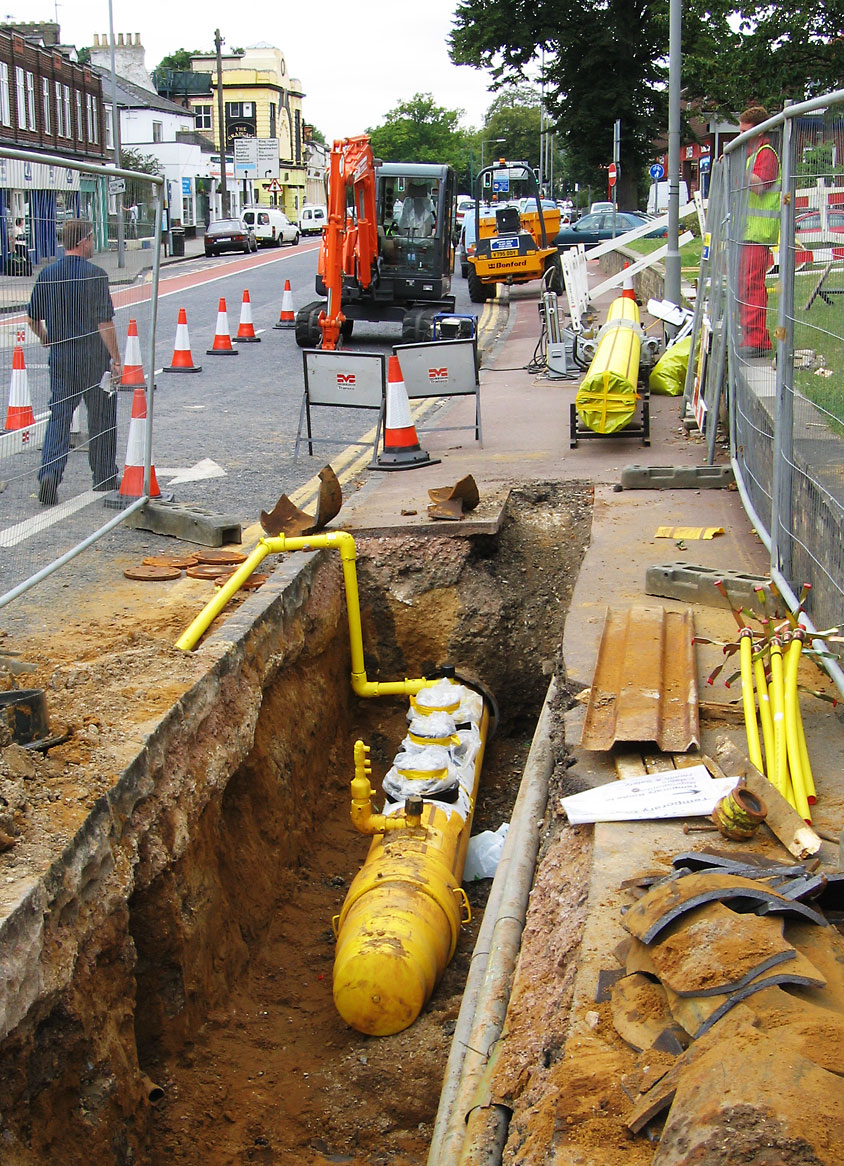
Polyethylene plastic main being placed in a trench.

In the same month (April 2016) British Gas also announced it would be closing a call centre and office in Oldbury (West Midlands), with a loss of approximately 680 jobs. In May 2018, Centrica announced that British Gas had lost 100,000 customers since the start of the year. However, the parent company was still likely to hit its targets of 2018, and pay dividends of 12p per share.

British Gas was led by chief executive, Sarwjit Sambhi, who oversees a business that provides energy and services to around ten million homes, and employs over 28,000 staff based across the United Kingdom. A further seven hundred job cuts in the United Kingdom were announced by Centrica in July 2019, amid growing marketplace challenges, which include the loss of 742,000 customers in 2018, and the government's price cap.

==== Vehicle fleet ====
In May 2007, British Gas signed a deal which saw 1,000 Volkswagen Caddy vans being supplied to the firm, which were fitted with a bespoke racking system and a speed limiter, designed by Siemens. The deal was renewed in September 2015.

In 2020 British Gas announced they would be introducing an all electric fleet of vans, with all diesel vehicles to be replaced by 2025. The company are currently replacing diesel vehicles with the Vauxhall Vivaro-e.

=== 2020s ===
In April 2021, British Gas changed the contractual terms and conditions for thousands of its workers. Those who did not accept the changes by midday on 14 April 2021, were told to leave the firm. This resulted in a public outcry over the treatment of long-time workers, in particular over social media and with support from workers' unions and the opposition Labour Party. In response, British Gas workers went on strike between January and June 2021, when workers accepted a new pay deal.

In 2023, British Gas came under criticism after a series of media stories highlighting their poor customer service and practice of breaking into homes to force people onto pre-payment meters. After an internal enquiry, they announced they would no longer use the third-party contractor responsible.

In a 2023 review, the UK government regulator for the energy sector, Ofgem, found that British Gas had 'moderate weaknesses' with their customer service processes, alongside the majority of suppliers.

== Advertising, sponsorship and marketing ==
British Gas has actively been involved in sports sponsorship since the early 2000s. This includes a six-year, £15 million deal with British Swimming between 2009 and 2015, encompassing the London 2012 Olympics. From 2006 to 2009, it sponsored the Southern Football League of England. British Gas has also sponsored the show Creature Comforts when it was shown on ITV1 in late 2005 The company's extensive television advertising has featured many high-profile individuals, and in the beginning of the 1990s, one advertisement included Cheryl Tweedy as a small child, more than ten years before the beginning of her pop music career.

In November 2012, the Information Commissioner's Office publicly listed British Gas as one of a number of companies that it had concerns about due to complaints of unsolicited marketing telephone calls. In response, British Gas said that "We uphold the highest standards when contacting people in their homes, and only use contact information if we have express permission to do so".

In July 2014, regulator Ofgem reached an agreement with British Gas for the company to pay £1 million in compensation to hundreds of people, who had been advised to switch from other suppliers to British Gas by British Gas advisers using exaggerated claims. On 20 September 2015, British Gas launched an advert, including their new mascot, Wilbur the Penguin.

In 2023 British Gas began a five-year partnership with the British Olympic Association and the British Paralympic Association.

== Distribution network operators ==
British Gas is a supplier of both gas and electricity for homes across the country. However the infrastructure (pipes) which delivers the gas to consumers is owned and maintained by other companies. Similarly, the network of towers and cables that distributes their electricity is maintained by distribution network operators (DNOs) which vary from region to region, and not by British Gas. So, as with other electricity suppliers, if there is an electrical power outage, it is necessary to contact the appropriate DNO, rather than British Gas or your other electricity supplier.

British Gas has six training centres, called British Gas Academies, in Rotherham, Thatcham, Dartford, Leicester, Stockport and Glasgow.

== See also ==
- Centrica
- Gas meter
