= North Eastern Gas Board =

Former UK state-owed utility

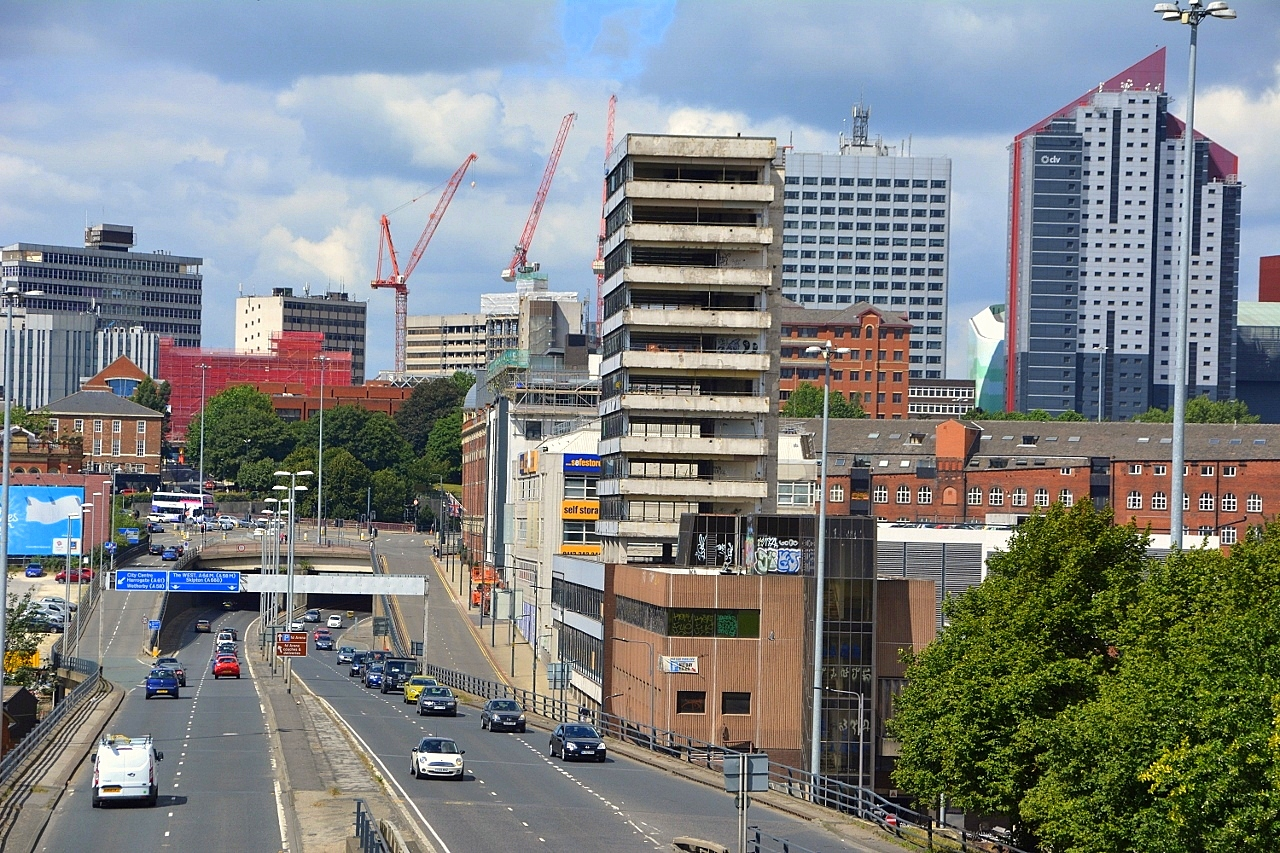
- The former headquarters (centre) being demolished in August 2016

State-owned utility overview
- Formed: 1 May 1949
- Dissolved: 1 January 1973
- Type: Gas board
- Status: Dissolved
- Headquarters: Bridge Street, Leeds, Yorkshire; 53°48′02″N 1°32′11″W

The North Eastern Gas Board (NEGB), later North East Gas (NeGas) was a state-owned utility providing gas for light and heat to industries and homes in modern-day West Yorkshire, the East Riding of Yorkshire and parts of North Yorkshire.

== History ==
The North East of England came instead under the Northern Gas Board. Modern day South Yorkshire (with the exception of the most northern parts of the Barnsley and Doncaster boroughs was also never under its remit; instead under the East Midlands Gas Board.

It was established on 1 May 1949 under the terms of the Gas Act 1948, and dissolved in 1973 when it became a region of the newly formed British Gas Corporation, British Gas North Eastern, as a result of the Gas Act 1972. The board's headquarters were in Leeds in buildings which later became administrative buildings for British Gas which were demolished in 2016.

The infrastructure of the former North Eastern Gas Board now forms the Southern region of the region of Northern Gas Networks.

=== Existing gas suppliers taken over ===
Under the Gas (Allocation of Undertakings to Area Boards and Gas Council) Order 1949 (SI 1949/742), the North Eastern Gas Board took over existing local authority and privately owned gas production and supply utilities in its area:

- Ackworth, Featherstone, Purston and Sharlston Gas Company
- Batley Corporation
- Beverley Corporation
- Bingley Urban District Council
- Bradford Corporation
- Bridlington Gas Company
- Brighouse Corporation
- Calverley and Horsforth District Gas Company
- Castleford and Whitwood Gas Light and Coke Company
- Hector Christie Ltd.
- Colne Valley Urban District Council
- Denby Dale Gas Light Company
- Dewsbury Corporation
- Driffield Urban District Council
- East Hull Gas Company
- Easingwold Gas Light and Coke Company
- Elland-cum-Greetland Gas Company
- Filey Urban District Council
- John Foster & Son Ltd.
- Garforth Gas Consumers' Company
- Goole Corporation
- Halifax Corporation
- Harrogate Gas Company
- Hebden Royd Urban District Council
- Hellifield and District Gas Company
- Helmsley Lighting Company
- Hemsworth Grimethorpe and District Gas Company
- Hessle Gas Company
- Holderness Gas Company
- Hornsea Gas Light and Coke Company
- Howden Gas Company
- Huddersfield Corporation
- Ilkley Urban District Council
- Keighley Corporation
- Kildwick Parish Gas Company
- Kippax and District Gas Company
- Kirbymoorside Lighting Company
- Kirkburton Shelley and Shepley Gas Company
- Knottingley Gas Company
- Leeds Corporation Malton Gas Company
- Market Weighton Gas Light and Coke Company
- Meltham Urban District Council
- Mirfield Gas Company Morley Gas Company
- W. B. G. H. Norton (Nortonthorpe Gas Undertaking)
- Normanton Gas Company
- Ossett Corporation
- Otley Gas Company
- Pickering Gas and Water Company
- Pocklington New Gas Company
- Pontefract Corporation
- Pudsey Coal Gas Company
- Rawcliffe Snaith District Gas Company
- Ripon Corporation
- E. A. Storm (trading as Robin Hood’s Bay Gas Company)
- Rothwell Gas Light Company
- Royston and Brodsworth Gas Company
- Scarborough Gas Company
- Selby Urban District Council
- Settle Gas Company
- Sherburn and South Milford Gas Company
- Shipley Urban District Council
- Silsden Urban District Council
- Skelmanthorpe Gas Company
- Skipton Urban District Council
- Sowerby Bridge Urban District Council
- Spenborough Urban District Council
- Thirsk Gas Company
- Todmorden Corporation
- Wakefield Gaslight Company
- West Yorkshire Gas Distribution Company
- Whitby Gas Company
- Whitwood Gas Company
- Yeadon Guiseley Gas Company
- York Gas Company

== Gallery ==
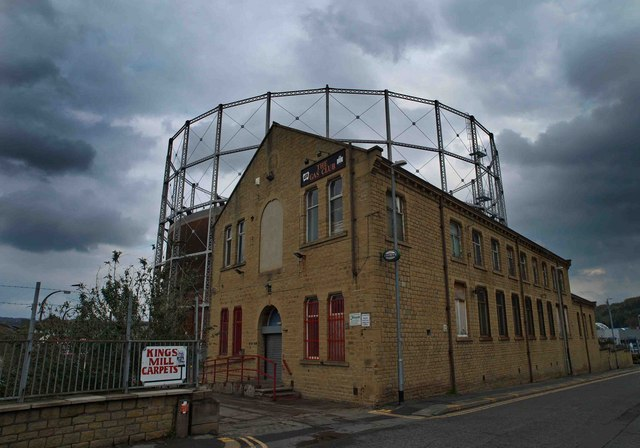
The Gas Club in Huddersfield; a social club for employees (seen in 2008).

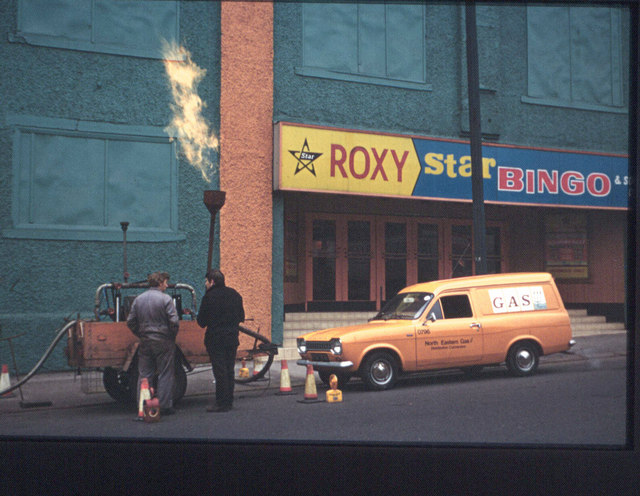
Conversion to natural gas in Bradford, 1973.

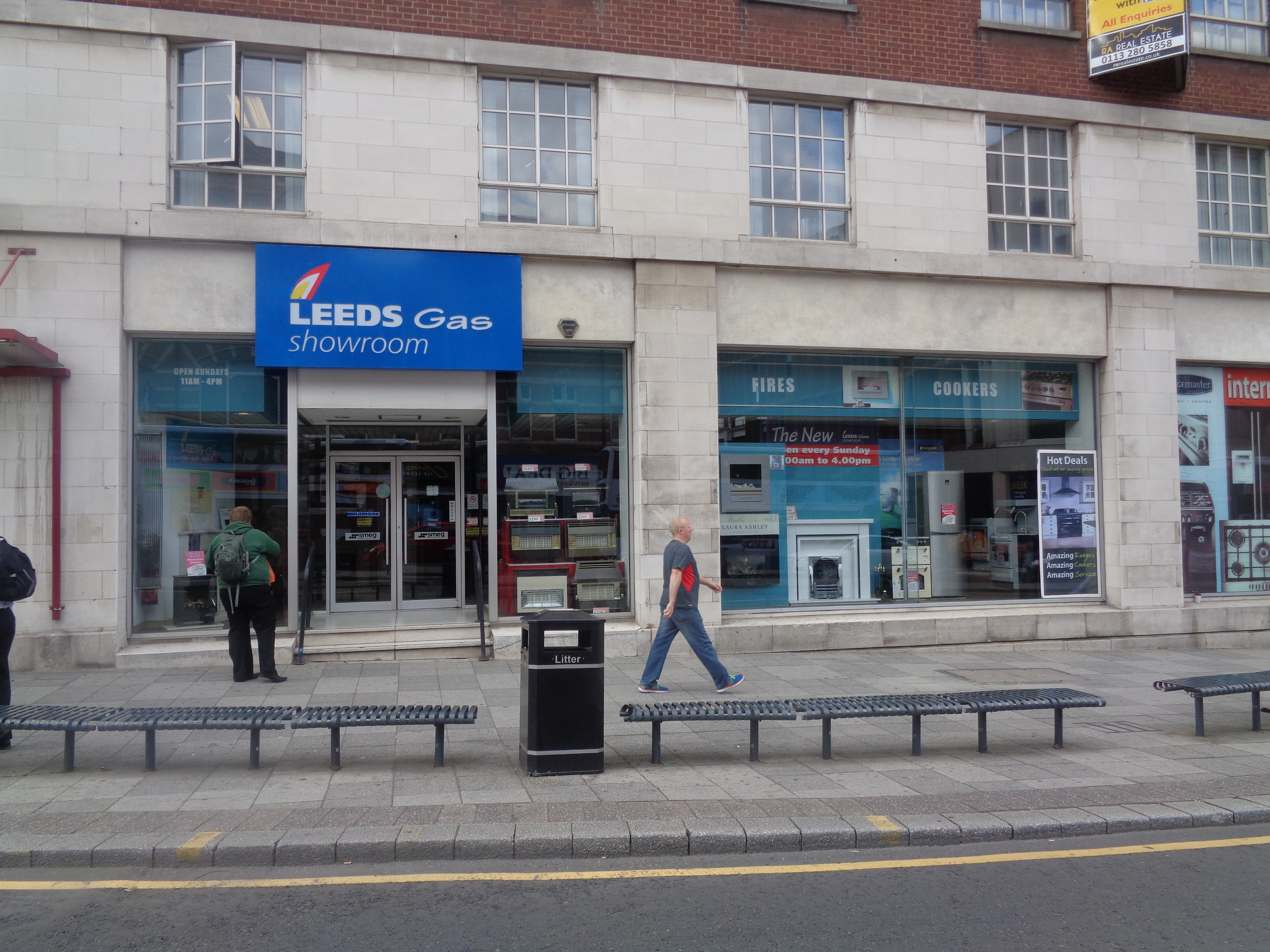
The NEGB's former showrooms on Eastgate, Leeds; now under private ownership (seen in 2014).

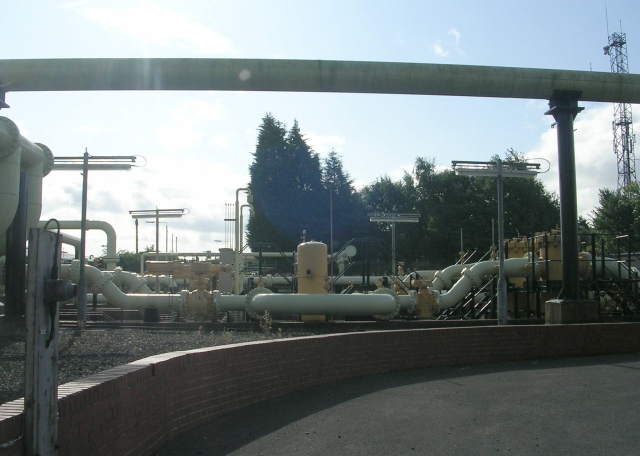
Infrastructure at the former Meadow Lane gas works, Leeds (seen in 2008)

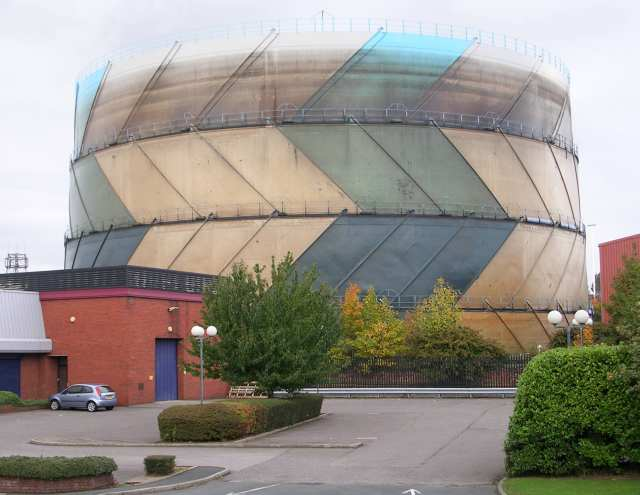
A gas storage site in Sheepscar, Leeds (seen in 2007)

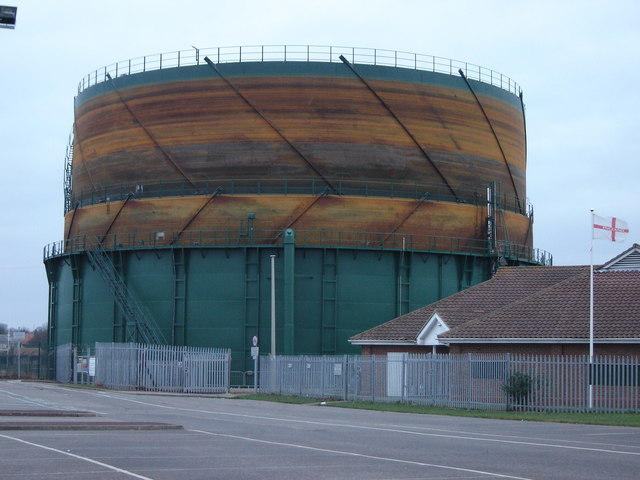
A gas storage site in Bridlington (seen in 2009)

== See also ==
- Gas board
- Northern Gas Networks
