= Scottish Gas Board =

Former UK state-owed utility

State-owned utility overview
- Formed: 1 May 1949
- Dissolved: 1 January 1973
- Type: Gas board
- Status: Dissolved
- Headquarters: 15 Calton Hill, Edinburgh

The Scottish Gas Board was a state-owned utility providing gas for light and heat to industries and homes in Scotland. The board was established on 1 May 1949, and dissolved in 1973 when it became a region of the British Gas Corporation.

== Existing gas suppliers taken over ==
Under the Gas (Allocation of Undertakings to Area Boards and Gas Council) Order 1949 (SI 1949/742), the Scottish Gas Board took over existing local authority and privately owned gas production and supply utilities in its area:

- Aberdeen Corporation
- Aberfeldy Gas Light Company
- Aberlady and Gullane Gas Company
- Airdrie Corporation
- Alloa Corporation
- Alyth Gas Light Company
- Annan Gas Company
- Arbroath Corporation
- Ardrossan Corporation
- Armadale Gas Company
- Auchinleck Gas Light Company
- Auchterarder Gas Light Company
- Auchtermuchty Gas Company
- Ayr Gas Company
- Ayton Gas Company
- Banchory Gas Light Company
- Banff and Macduff District Gas Company
- Bathgate Gas Company
- Barrhead Gas Company
- Beith Gas Light Company
- Biggar Gas Company
- Blairgowrie Gas Light Company
- Bo'ness Gas Light Company
- Brechin Gas Company
- Bridge of Weir Gas Company
- Broxburn Gas Company
- Buckhaven and Leven Gas Commissioners
- Buckie Gas Light Company
- Burntisland Corporation
- Busby and District Gas Company
- Callander Gas Company
- Campbeltown Corporation
- Cardenden Gas Company
- Carluke Gas Company
- Carnoustie Corporation
- Castle-Douglas Gas Company
- Catrine Gas Company
- Coatbridge Gas Company
- Coldstream Gas Company
- Coltness Iron Company
- F. B. Keillor (trading as Comrie Gas Light Company)
- Coupar Angus Gas Company
- Cove and Kilcreggan Corporation
- Cowdenbeath Gas Company
- Crieff Gas-Light Company
- Cullen District Gas Company
- Cumnock Gas Company
- Cupar Gas Company
- Dalbeattie Gas Light Company
- Dalkeith Gas Light Company
- Dalry Gas Light Company
- Darvel Corporation
- Denny and Dunipace Corporation
- Dingwall Corporation
- Dollar Gas Company
- Doune Corporation
- Dumbarton Corporation
- Dumfries Corporation
- Dunbar Corporation
- Dunblane Gas Company
- Dundee Corporation
- Dunfermline Corporation
- Dunlop Gas Light Company
- Dunning Gas Company
- Dunoon Corporation
- Duns Gas Company
- Earlston Gas Company
- East Linton Gas Light Company
- Edinburgh Corporation
- Elgin Corporation
- Eyemouth Gas Company
- Falkirk Corporation
- Falkland Gas Undertaker
- Fauldhouse Gas Company
- Forfar Corporation
- Forres Gas Light Company
- Fraserburgh Corporation
- Galashiels Gas Company
- Galston Gas Company
- Girvan Gas Company
- Glasgow Corporation
- Gorebridge Gas Light Company
- Gourock Corporation
- Grangemouth Corporation
- Greenock Corporation
- Haddington Gas Company
- Hamilton Corporation
- Hawick Gas Company
- Helensburgh Corporation
- Huntly Gas Company
- Innerleithen Gas Light Company
- Inverbervie Corporation
- Inverkeithing Gas Light Company
- Inverness Corporation
- Inverurie Gas Company
- Irvine and District Gas Company
- Jedburgh Gas Company
- Johnstone Corporation
- Keith Gas Company
- Kelso Gas Company
- Kelty Gas Company
- Kennoway and Largo Gas Company
- Kettle and District Gas Company
- Kilmacolm Gas Company
- Kilmarnock Corporation
- Kilsyth Corporation
- Kilwinning Gas Company
- Kinghorn Gas-Light Company
- Kinross and Milnathorf Gas Light Company
- Kirkcaldy Corporation
- Kirkconnel Gas Company
- Kirkcudbright Corporation
- Kirkintilloch Corporation
- Kirkwall Corporation
- Kirriemuir Gas Company
- Lanark Corporation
- Lanarkshire County Council
- Langholm Gas and Electricity Supply Company
- Largs Corporation
- Lasswade and Bonnyrigg Gas Light Company
- Laurencekirk Lighting Society Limited
- Lerwick Gas Company
- Leslie Gas Company
- Lesmahagow Gas Light Company
- Linlithgow Gas Company
- Loanhead Gas Company
- Lochgelly Gas Company
- Lochwinnoch Gas Light Company
- Lockerbie Corporation
- Markinch Gas Light Company
- Maybole Gas Light Company
- Melrose Gas Company
- Millport Corporation
- Moffat Gas Light Company
- Monifieth Corporation
- Montrose Gas Company
- Motherwell and Wishaw Corporation
- Muirkirk Gas-Light Company
- Musselburgh Gas Company
- Nairn Gas Light Company
- Neilston Gas Light Company
- Newburgh Gas Company
- New Cumnock Gas Company
- Newmilns and Greenholm Corporation
- Newport Corporation
- Newton-on-Ayr Gas Company
- Newton-Stewart Gas Company
- North Berwick Corporation
- Oban & District Gas Company
- Oldmeldrum Corporation
- Paisley Corporation
- Peebles Corporation
- Penicuik and District Gas Company
- Perth Corporation
- Peterhead Corporation
- Pitlochry New Gas Light Company
- Prestonpans and District Gas Company
- Polmont District Gas Company
- Port Glasgow Corporation
- Renfrew Corporation
- Rothesay Corporation
- St Andrews Gas Company
- Sanquhar Corporation
- Saltcoats Gas Company
- Selkirk Gas Company
- Skelmorlie and Wemyss Bay Gas and Electric Supply Company
- Stane and Dykehead Gas Company
- Stevenston Gas Company
- Stewarton Gas Company
- Stirling Gas Light Company
- Stonehaven Gas Company
- Stornoway Gas Light Company
- Stranraer Gas Company
- Strathaven Gas Company
- Strathmiglo Gas Company
- Stromness Corporation
- Tain Corporation
- Tayport Corporation
- Thurso and North of Scotland Gas Corporation
- Tranent Gas Company
- Troon Corporation
- Turriff Gas Company
- Vale of Leven Gas Company
- The trustees of the late R. G. E. Wemyss
- W. & J. Knox Limited
- W. Watson (trading as Lauder Gas Company)
- West Calder Gas Company
- West Kilbride Gas Light Company
- Wick Gas Company
- Wigtown Corporation

== See also ==
- Gas board
