= Southern Gas Board =

Former UK state-owed utility

State-owned utility overview
- Formed: 1 May 1949
- Dissolved: 1 January 1973
- Type: Gas board
- Status: Dissolved
- Headquarters: 164 Above Bar Street, Southampton

The Southern Gas Board was a state-owned utility area gas board providing gas for light and heat to industries and homes in Dorset, Hampshire, the Isle of Wight and parts of Bedfordshire, Berkshire, Buckinghamshire, Devon, Hertfordshire, Northamptonshire, Oxfordshire, Somerset, Surrey, Sussex and Wiltshire.

It was established on 1 May 1949 under the terms of the Gas Act 1948, and dissolved in 1973 when it became a region of the newly formed British Gas Corporation, British Gas Southern, as a result of the Gas Act 1972.

== Existing gas suppliers taken over ==
Under the Gas (Allocation of Undertakings to Area Boards and Gas Council) Order 1949 (SI 1949/742), the Southern Gas Board took over existing local authority and privately owned gas production and supply utilities in its area:

- Alresford Gas Company
- Andover Lighting and Company
- Associated Utilities
- Aylesbury Gas Company
- Banbury Gaslight and Coke Company
- Basingstoke Gas Company
- Blandford Gas Company
- Bognor and District Gas and Electricity Company
- Bournemouth Gas and Water Company
- Brackley Gas Company
- Bridport Gas Company
- Chipping Norton Gas Light and Coke Company
- Cowes Urban District Council
- Dorchester Gas and Coke Company
- East Cowes Gas Company
- East Wight Gas Company
- Farnham Gas and Company
- Fordingbridge Gas Company
- Freshwater Gas Company
- Haslemere and District Gas Company
- Leighton Buzzard Gas Company
- Mere, Gas, Coal, and Coke Company
- Midhurst Gas Company
- Mid Southern Utility Company
- Milborne Port Gas Company
- Newbury Corporation
- Newport (Isle of Wight) Corporation
- Oxford and District Gas Company
- Petersfield and Selsey Gas Company
- Portland Urban District Council
- Portsmouth and Gosport Gas Company
- Princes Risborough Gas Light and Coke Company
- Reading Gas Company
- Romsey Gas and Coke Company
- Ryde Gaslight Company
- Salisbury Gas Company
- Shaftesbury Gillingham and District Gas Company
- Sherborne Gas and Coke Company
- Southampton Gaslight and Coke Company
- South Midland Gas Corporation
- Swanage Gas and Electricity Company
- Thame Gas and Coke Company
- Titchfield District Gas Company
- Tring Gas Company
- United District Gas Company
- Wallingford Corporation
- Wantage Urban District Council
- Weymouth Consumers' Gas Company
- Whitchurch (Hants) Gas and Electricity Company
- Winslow New Gas Company
- Witney Gas and Coke Company
- Woodstock Power Syndicate
- Yorktown (Camberley) and District Gas and Electricity Company

== See also ==
- Gas board
