= South Western Gas Board =

Former UK state-owed utility

State-owned utility overview
- Formed: 1 May 1949
- Dissolved: 1 January 1973
- Type: Gas board
- Status: Dissolved
- Headquarters: Bath

The South Western Gas Board was a state-owned utility area gas board providing gas for light and heat to industries and homes in Cornwall (including the Isles of Scilly), Gloucestershire and parts of Berkshire, Devon, Herefordshire, Oxfordshire, Somerset, Warwickshire, Wiltshire and Worcestershire.

It was established on 1 May 1949 under the terms of the Gas Act 1948, and dissolved in 1973 when it became a region of the newly formed British Gas Corporation, British Gas South Western, as a result of the Gas Act 1972.

== Existing gas suppliers taken over ==
Under the Gas (Allocation of Undertakings to Area Boards and Gas Council) Order 1949 (SI 1949/742), the South Western Gas Board took over existing local authority and privately owned gas production and supply utilities in its area:

- Barnstaple Gas Company
- Bath Gas Company
- Berkeley Gas Works
- Bideford Gas and Coke Company
- Bidford-on-Avon Gas Company
- Bodmin Gas Consumers' Company
- Bourton-on-the-Water Gas Company
- Bradford-on-Avon Gas Company
- Bridgewater Gas Light Company
- Bristol Gas Company
- Bruton Gas and Coke Company
- Bude Gas Company
- Budleigh Salterton Gas Company
- Camborne Gas Company
- Campden Gas Company
- Castle Cary Gas and Coke Company
- Chard Corporation
- Cheltenham and District Gas Company
- Chew Magna Gas Undertaker
- Chipping Sodbury Gas and Coke Company
- Cinderford Gas Company
- Clevedon and Yatton Gas Company
- Coleford Gas and Coke Company
- Colyton Gas Coke and Coal Company
- Crediton Gas Company
- Crewkerne Gas and Coke Company
- Dartmouth Gas Coke and Coal Company
- Dawlish Gas and Coke Company
- Devizes Corporation
- Devon Gas Association
- Dursley Gas Light and Coke Company
- Evesham Corporation
- Exeter Gaslight and Coke Company
- Exmouth Gas Company
- Falmouth Gas Company
- Fowey Gas Company
- Glastonbury and District Gas Company
- Gloucester Gaslight Company
- Hayle Gas Company
- Helston and District Gas Company
- N. Holman & Sons Ltd.
- Honiton Gas and Coke Company
- Ilfracombe Gas Company
- Langport, Huish and Curry Rivel Gas Company
- Launceston Gas Company
- Liskeard Gas Company
- T. W. Little and Sons Ltd.
- Looe Gas and Coke Consumers' Company
- Lostwithiel Gas Light and Coke Company
- Lydney Gas Light and Coke Company
- Malmesbury Gas and Coke Company
- Martock and District Gas Consumers Company
- Midsomer Norton Gas and Coke Company
- Minehead Gas-Light and Coke Company
- Newquay (Cornwall) Gas Company
- Newton Abbott and District Gas and Coke Company
- Newent Gas Company
- Newnham Gas Light and Coke Company
- Okehampton Gas Company
- Padstow and St. Columb Gas Company
- Penryn Gas Company
- Penzance Gas Company
- Plymouth Corporation
- Plymouth and Stonehouse Gas Light and Coke Company
- Portishead Gas Company
- Redruth Gas Company
- Ross Gas Company
- St. Austell Gas Company
- Saint Blazey Gas Company
- St. Ives (Cornwall) Corporation
- Saltash Gas and Coke Company
- Seaton, Axminster and District Gas Company
- Severn Valley Gas Corporation
- Shepton Mallet Gas Company
- Sidmouth Urban District Council
- George Small (Devon) Ltd.
- Somerton Gas Company
- South Molton Corporation
- South Western Electricity Board
- Stow on the Wold Gas and Coke Company
- Stroud Gaslight and Coke Company
- Swindon United Gas Company
- Taunton and District Gas Company
- Tavistock Lighting, Coal and Coke Company
- Teignmouth Urban District Council
- Thornbury Gas Light and Coke Company
- Tiverton Corporation
- Torpoint Coal and Gas Company
- Torquay and Paignton Gas Company
- Truro Gas Company
- Wadebridge Gas Company
- Warminster Gas and Coke Company
- Watchet and Williton Gas-Light and Coke Company
- Wellington (Somerset) Gas Company
- Wells Gas Light Company
- Westbury Gas and Coke Company
- Weston-super-Mare and District Gas Company
- Samuel While & Son Ltd.
- Wincanton Coal Gas Company
- Wotton-under-Edge and District Gas Company
- Yeovil Corporation

== See also ==
- Gas board
