= Flatiron (ship) =

Bulk cargo coastal ship to carry coal

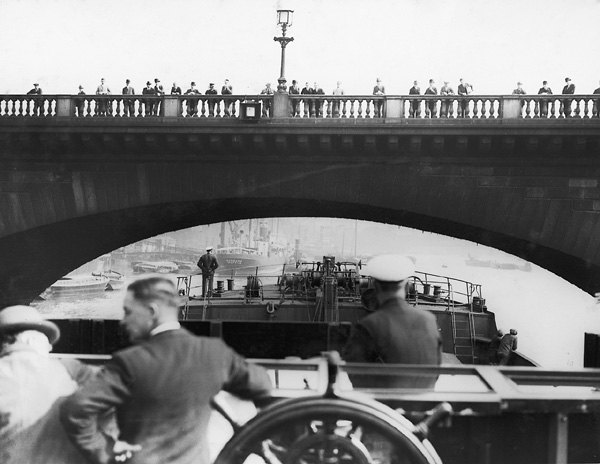
Wandsworth and District Gas Company's SS Ewell in 1926 approaching London Bridge with her mast, funnel and wheelhouse folded down

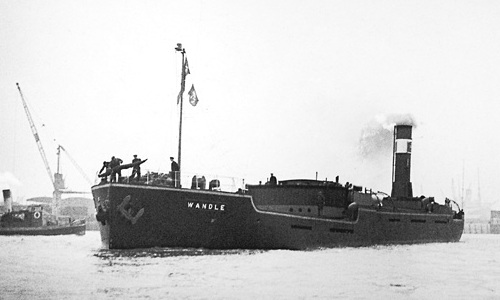
Wandsworth and District Gas Company's SS Wandle steaming up the Thames on her maiden voyage in 1932 with her mast and funnel up

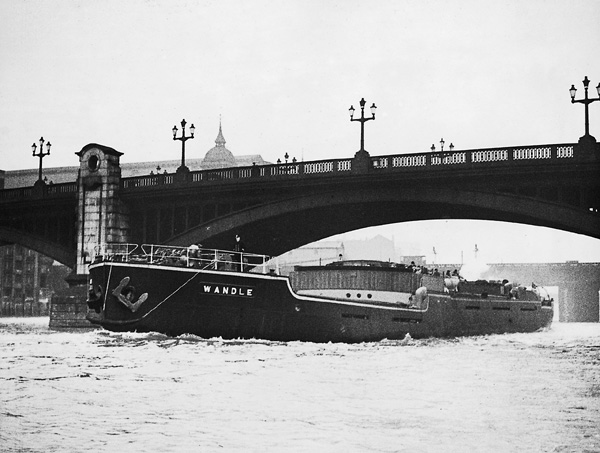
SS Wandle in 1932 passing under Southwark Bridge with her mast, funnel and wheelhouse folded down

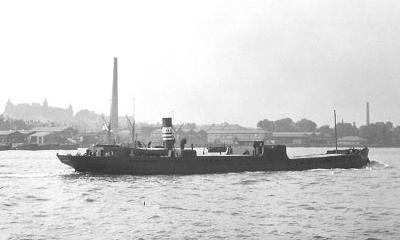
Gas Light and Coke Company's SS Suntrap at Woolwich in 1931, steaming upriver to Nine Elms Gasworks

A flatiron, or flattie, is a type of coastal trading vessel designed to pass under bridges that have limited clearance. Her mast(s) are hinged or telescopic, her funnel may be hinged, and her wheelhouse may also fold flat.

Flatirons were developed in the UK in the latter part of the 19th century. Most were colliers built to bring coal from North East England and South Wales to gasworks and power stations on the River Thames that were upriver from the Pool of London.

== Development ==
Until the middle of the 20th century flatirons were built with triple-expansion steam engines. The largest steam flatirons were more than 1,550 gross register tons. The last steam-powered flatirons were built in the 1950s.

By the middle of the 1940s flatiron motor ships with marine diesel engines were being built. The largest motor flatirons were more than 1,870 GRT and more than 2,800 deadweight tons.

== Fleets ==
Some of Stephenson Clarke and Associates' fleet were flatirons. William Cory and Son's fleet included at least one flatiron. The Gas Light and Coke Company's collier fleet included flatirons to serve its gasworks at Fulham and Nine Elms. The London Power Company's collier fleet included flatirons to serve Battersea Power Station. The Metropolitan Borough of Fulham had a flatiron fleet to serve Fulham Power Station. The Wandsworth and District Gas Company had a flatiron fleet to serve Wandsworth Gasworks.

When Britain nationalised its electricity suppliers in 1948 and gas suppliers in 1949, the new British Electricity Authority (later the Central Electricity Authority), North Thames Gas Board and South Eastern Gas Board all inherited flatiron fleets from their predecessor companies. North Thames Gas had one diesel flatiron built in 1949 and the SEGB continued to have diesel flatirons built until 1956.

== Decline ==
After the middle of the 1960s the need for flatirons started to decline. In 1966 gas suppliers started to convert from coal gas to North Sea natural gas, so that by the early 1970s coal gas gasworks were being closed and demolished. Secondly the Central Electricity Generating Board reconfigured its generating capacity with small numbers of larger, more modern power stations away from the centre of London, which led to the decommissioning of Battersea A power station in 1975, Fulham Power Station in 1978 and Battersea B Power Station in 1983. By the mid-1980s the need to carry thousands of tons of coal on the Thames above the Pool of London had ceased.

Redundant flatirons were sold to private shipping companies who used them as conventional coasters. By the middle of the 1970s several had ended up with Greek or Cypriot owners. One, the SEGB's MV Kingston (1956), was renamed Tsimention in 1971 and survived until 1983 when she was broken up.

== See also ==
- Gas board
- Wandsworth and District Gas Company – UK business
- Naval architecture – Engineering discipline of marine vessels
