= Wales Gas Board =

Former UK state-owed utility

State-owned utility overview
- Formed: 1 May 1949
- Dissolved: 1 January 1973
- Type: Gas board
- Status: Dissolved
- Headquarters: Cardiff

The Wales Gas Board was a state-owned utility area gas board providing gas for light and heat to industries and homes in Wales.

It was established on 1 May 1949 under the terms of the Gas Act 1948, and dissolved in 1973 when it became a region of the newly formed British Gas Corporation, British Gas Wales, as a result of the Gas Act 1972.

== Existing gas suppliers taken over ==
Under the Gas (Allocation of Undertakings to Area Boards and Gas Council) Order 1949 (SI 1949/742), the Wales Gas Board took over existing local authority and privately owned gas production and supply utilities in its area:

- Abercarn Urban District Council
- Aberdare and Aberaman Consumers Gas Company
- Abergavenny Corporation
- Abertillery Urban District Council
- Aberystwyth Gas Company
- Ammanford Gas Company
- Bala Urban District Council
- Bangor Corporation
- Barmouth Gas Company
- Barry Corporation
- Beaufort Gas Company
- Bedwellty Urban District Council
- Bethesda Urban District Council
- Brecon Gas Company
- Bridgend Gas Company
- Brynmawr and Blaina Gas Company
- Buckley Gas Company
- Builth Gas and Coke Company
- Caernarvon Corporation
- Caldicot and District Gas Light and Coke Company
- Cardiff Gas Light and Coke Company
- Carmarthen Gas Company
- Cefn Mawr and Rhos-y-Medre Gas Company
- Chepstow Gas Company
- Colwyn Bay Corporation
- Connah's Quay Gas Company
- Conway Gas Company
- Corwen Gas Company
- Cowbridge Gas Company
- Denbigh Gas and Coke Company
- Dolgelley Gas and Coal Company
- Dowlais Gas and Coke Company
- East Anglesey Gas Company
- Festiniog Urban District Council
- Garw and Ogmore Gas Company
- Glyncorrwg Urban District Council
- Gowerton Gas Company
- Haverfordwest Corporation
- Hawarden Gas and Coke Company
- Hay Gas and Coke Company
- Holyhead and North Wales Gas and Water Corporation
- Knighton Gas Company
- Lampeter, Llandyssil, Tregaron and Aberayron Gas Company
- Llandilo Gas Light Company
- Llandovery Gas Company
- Llandrindod Wells Gas Company
- Llandudno Urban District Council
- Llanelly Gaslight Company
- Llanfyllin Gas Company
- Llangollen Gas Company
- Llanidloes Gas, Coal and Coke Company
- Llantrisant and District Gas Company
- Llynvi Valley Gas Company
- Machynlleth Gas Company
- Merthyr Tydfil Gas Company
- Milford Haven Urban District Council
- Mold Gas and Water Company
- Monmouth Gas and Water Works Company
- Mountain Ash Urban District Council
- Mynyddislwyn Urban District Council
- Nantlle Vale Gas Company
- Neath Corporation
- Newport (Monmouthshire) Gas Company
- Newtown and Llanilwchaiarn Urban District Council
- Neyland Urban District Council
- Pembroke District Gas Company
- Pontardulais Gas Company
- Pontypool Gas and Water Company
- Pontypridd Urban District Council
- Porthcawl Urban District Council
- Portmadoc Urban District Council
- Port Talbot Corporation
- Prestatyn Urban District Council
- Presteigne Gas Company
- Quaker's Yard Gas and Water Company
- Rhayader Gas Light Company
- Rhondda Urban District Council
- Rhos Gas Company
- Rhymney and Aber Gas Company
- Rhyl Urban District Council
- Risca Urban District Council
- St. Asaph Gas Company
- St. David's Water and Gas Company
- South Wales Gas Corporation
- Swansea Gaslight Company
- Tawe Valley Gas Company
- Tenby Gas Consumers' Company Ltd.
- Towyn and Aberdovey Gas Company
- Tredegar Urban District Council
- United Gas Industries
- Welshpool Gas Company
- Whitland Gas Works
- Wrexham Gas Company

== See also ==
- Gas board
