= Northern Gas Networks =

British gas distribution company

Northern Gas Networks Limited
- Type: Private
- Industry: Energy
- Founded: 2005; 21 years ago
- Headquarters: Thorpe Park, Leeds, United Kingdom
- Key people: Mark Horsley (CEO)
- Products: Natural gas distribution
- Owner: Cheung Kong Infrastructure Holdings, Power Assets Holdings & SAS Trustee Corporation
- Number of employees: 2,658
- Website: www.northerngasnetworks.co.uk

Northern Gas Networks Limited is the British company responsible for distributing gas to homes and businesses across Yorkshire, the North East and northern Cumbria, England. Northern Gas Networks Limited is one of eight gas distribution networks in the United Kingdom.

The consortium which owns Northern Gas Networks Limited was successful in acquiring the North of England Distribution Network (DN) from National Grid and took over the control of the assets on 1 June 2005. Currently, the company supplies gas to approximately 2.6 million customers through a network of 37,000 kilometres (23,000 mi) of gas pipeline in Yorkshire, North East England and parts of Cumbria.

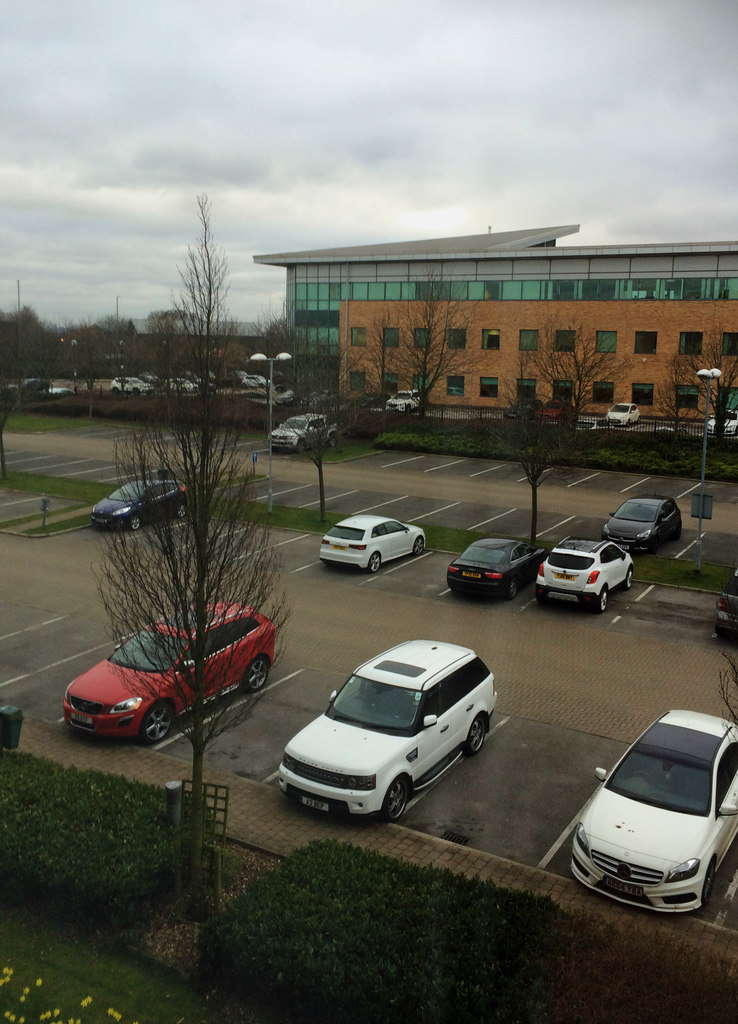
The company's headquarters in Leeds

The company performed the best in terms of total cost efficiency benchmarked by Ofgem, which regulates the company's contracts and charges.

It was reported in December 2011 that the energy regulator Ofgem was set to fine Northern Gas Networks £900,000 for breaching licence conditions over gas escapes during the 2010/11 winter.

== See also ==
- North Eastern Gas Board (the former state-owned utility in the southern half of the NGN region)
- Northern Gas Board (the former state-owned utility in the northern half of the NGN region)
