= Eastern Gas Board =

Former UK state-owed utility

State-owned utility overview
- Formed: 1 May 1949
- Dissolved: 1 January 1973
- Type: Gas board
- Status: Dissolved
- Headquarters: Star House, Mutton Lane, Potters Bar

The Eastern Gas Board was a state-owned utility area gas board providing gas for light and heat to industries and homes in Cambridgeshire, Huntingdonshire, the Isle of Ely, Norfolk, the Soke of Peterborough, Suffolk and parts of Bedfordshire, Buckinghamshire, Essex, Hertfordshire and Middlesex.

It was established on 1 May 1949 under the terms of the Gas Act 1948, and dissolved in 1973 when it became a region of the newly formed British Gas Corporation, British Gas Eastern, as a result of the Gas Act 1972.

== Existing gas suppliers taken over ==
Under the Gas (Allocation of Undertakings to Area Boards and Gas Council) Order 1949 (SI 1949/742), the Eastern Gas Board took over existing local authority and privately owned gas production and supply utilities in its area:

- Aldeburgh Gas Light Company
- Aspley Guise and Woburn Sands Gas Company
- Attleborough Gas Company
- Baldock Gas Light and Coke Company
- Barnet District Gas and Water Company
- Beccles Water and Gas Company
- Bedford District Gas Company
- Berkhampstead Gas Company
- Bishop's Stortford, Epping and District Gas Company
- Braintree and Bocking Gas Company
- Brightlingsea Gas and Coke Company
- British Gas Light Company
- Burnham Gas Company
- Bury St. Edmund's Gas Company
- Cambridge University and Town Gaslight Company
- Chelmsford Corporation
- Chesham and District Gas Company
- Clacton Urban District Council
- Colchester Gas Company
- Cromer Gas Company
- Dunmow Light and Heat Company
- Dunstable Gas and Water Company
- Earls Colne Gas Light and Coke Company
- East Dereham Urban District Council
- Eastern Electricity Board
- Ely Gas and Electricity Company
- Fakenham Gas and Coke Company
- First Garden City
- Framlingham Gas Light Company
- Gorleston and Southtown Gas Company
- Great Yarmouth Gas Company
- Hadleigh Gas Consumers' Company
- Halesworth Gas Company
- Halstead Gas Company
- Harwich Gas and Coke Company
- Haverhill Urban District Council
- Huntingdon and Godmanchester Gas and Coke Company
- Ipswich Gas Light Company
- Kelvedon and Coggleshall Gas Company
- King's Lynn Gas Company
- Leiston Gas Company
- Littleport Gas Company
- Lodden Gas Consumers' Company
- Lowestoft Water and Gas Company
- Luton Gas Company
- Maldon Gas Light Company
- Manningtree and Mistley Gas Company
- March Gas and Coke Company
- Mundesley and Holt Gas Company
- Needham Market Gas Light Company
- New Hunstanton Urban District Council
- Newmarket Gas Company
- North Walsham Gas Light and Coke Company
- Peterborough Gas Company
- Potton Gas Company
- Ramsey Gas Company
- Royston Gas Company
- Saffron Walden Corporation
- St. Ives (Hunts) Gas Company
- St. Margaret's Gas Company
- St. Neots Gas and Coke Company
- Sandy Gas Company
- Saxmundham Gas Company
- Sheringham Gas and Water Company
- Soham and District Gas Company
- Southminster Gas Company
- Southwold Gas Light Company
- Stowmarket Gas Light and Coke Company
- Sudbury Gas and Coke Company
- Swaffham Gas Light and Coke Company
- Tendring Hundred Waterworks Company
- Tottenham and District Gas Company
- Watford and St. Albans Gas Company
- Watton Gas and Coke Company
- Wells-next-the-Sea Urban District Council
- Whittlesey Gas Company
- Wisbech Lighting Company
- Witham Gas Light and Coke Company
- Woburn Gas Light and Coke Company
- Wyvenhoe Gas Company

== See also ==
- Gas board
