= West Midlands Gas Board =

Former UK state-owed utility

State-owned utility overview
- Formed: 1 May 1949
- Dissolved: 1 January 1973
- Type: Gas board
- Status: Dissolved
- Headquarters: Wharf Lane, Solihull

The West Midlands Gas Board was a state-owned utility area gas board providing gas for light and heat to industries and homes in parts of Cheshire, Herefordshire, Leicestershire, Shropshire, Staffordshire, Warwickshire (including Birmingham) and Worcestershire.

It was established on 1 May 1949 under the terms of the Gas Act 1948, and dissolved in 1973 when it became a region of the newly formed British Gas Corporation, British Gas West Midlands, as a result of the Gas Act 1972.

== Existing gas suppliers taken over ==
Under the Gas (Allocation of Undertakings to Area Boards and Gas Council) Order 1949 (SI 1949/742), the West Midlands Gas Board took over existing local authority and privately owned gas production and supply utilities in its area:

- Albrighton Gas Company
- Atherstone Gas Light and Coke Company
- Bewdley Gas Company
- Bilston Gas Light and Coke Company
- Birmingham Corporation
- Bridgnorth Corporation
- Bromsgrove Gaslight and Coke Company
- Bromyard Gas Company
- Cannock District Gas Company
- Chasetown Gas Company
- Cheadle and Churnet Valley Gas Company
- Church Stretton Gas Company
- Colwall Gas Company
- Congleton Corporation
- Coventry Corporation
- Cradley Heath Gas Company
- Droitwich Corporation
- Dudley Brierley Hill and District Gas Company
- Ellesmere Urban District Council
- Gas Consolidation
- Halesowen Gas Company
- Henley in Arden Gas Coal and Coke Company
- Hereford Corporation
- Hinckley Urban District Council
- Iron Bridge and District Gas Company
- Kidderminster Gas Company
- Kidsgrove Gaslight Company
- Leamington Priors Gas Company
- Ledbury Gas, Coal, and Coke Company
- Leek Urban District Council
- Leominster Gas and Coke Company
- Lichfield Gas Company
- Ludlow Union Gas Company
- Malvern Urban District Council
- Market Drayton Gas Company
- Newcastle-under-Lyme Corporation
- Newport (Salop) Urban District Council
- Nuneaton Gas Company
- Oldbury Corporation
- Oswestry Gas Light and Coke Company
- Redditch Gas Company
- Rowley Regis and Blackheath Gas Company
- Rugby Gas Company
- Rugeley Gas Company
- Sedgley Urban District Council
- Shifnal Gas Light Coke Company
- Shipston-on-Stour Gas, Light, Coke and Coal Company
- Shrewsbury Gas Light Company
- Smethwick Corporation
- Solihull Gas Company
- South Staffordshire Mond Gas Company
- Stafford Corporation
- Stoke-on-Trent Corporation
- Stone Gas Light and Coke Company
- Stourbridge Corporation
- Stourport Gas Company
- Stourvale Gas Company
- Stratford-upon-Avon Corporation
- Tamworth Gaslight and Coke Company
- Tenbury Union Gas Company
- Tipton Corporation
- Upton-on-Severn Gas Company
- Uttoxeter Gas Works
- Walsall Corporation Warwick Gas Company
- Wellington (Salop) Gas Company
- Wem Gas-Light and Coke Company
- West Bromwich Corporation West
- Staffordshire Gas Company
- Willenhall Gas Company
- Wolverhampton Gas Company
- Worcester New Gas Light Company

== See also ==
- Gas board
