= North Western Gas Board =

Former UK state-owed utility

State-owned utility overview
- Formed: 1 May 1949
- Dissolved: 1 January 1973
- Type: Gas board
- Status: Dissolved
- Headquarters: Welman House, Moss Lane, Altringham

The North Western Gas Board was a state-owned utility area gas board providing gas for light and heat to industries and homes in the north-west of England.

It was established on 1 May 1949 under the terms of the Gas Act 1948, and dissolved in 1973 when it became a region of the newly formed British Gas Corporation, British Gas North Western, as a result of the Gas Act 1972.

== Existing gas suppliers taken over ==
Under the Gas (Allocation of Undertakings to Area Boards and Gas Council) Order 1949 (SI 1949/742), the North Western Gas Board took over existing local authority and privately owned gas production and supply utilities in its area:

- Accrington District Gas and Water Board
- Altrincham Gas Company
- Ashton Gas Company
- Ashton-in-Makerfield Urban District Council
- Atherton Urban District Council
- Barnoldswick Urban District Council
- Barrow-in-Furness Corporation
- Bentham Gas Company
- Birkenhead Corporation
- Blackburn Corporation
- Blackpool Corporation
- Bollington Urban District Council
- Bolton Corporation
- Broadbottom Gas Company
- Burnley Corporation
- Bury Corporation Buxton Corporation
- Carnforth Gas Company
- Chapel Whaley and District Gas Company
- Chester United Gas Company
- Chorley Corporation
- Clitheroe Corporation
- Colne Corporation
- Dalton-in-Furness Council
- Darwen Corporation
- Earby and Thornton Gas and Lighting Company
- Ellesmere Port Urban Council
- Fleetwood Gas Company
- Garstang Gas Company
- Glossop Gas Company
- Golborne Gas Company
- Grange and Cartmel District Gas Company
- Haslingden Union Gas Company
- Hayfield Gas Company
- Heywood Corporation
- Hindley Urban District Council
- Hollingworth Gas Company
- Hoylake Urban District Council
- H. Saville (trading as Ingleton Gas Company)
- Kendal Corporation
- Kirkby Lonsdale Gas Company
- Kirkham Gas Company
- Knutsford Light and Water Company
- Lakes Urban District Council
- Lancaster Corporation
- Leigh Corporation
- Leyland Gas Company
- Littleborough Gas Company
- Liverpool Gas Company
- Longridge Gas Company
- Lymm Urban District Council
- Lytham St. Annes Corporation
- Macclesfield Corporation
- Malpas Gas Company
- Manchester Corporation
- Marple Urban District Council
- Middleton Corporation
- Middlewich Gas Light and Coke Company
- Millom Rural District Council
- Milnthorpe Gas Coal Coke and Lime Company
- Morecambe and Heysham Corporation
- Mossley and Saddleworth Gas Company
- Nantwich Gas Company
- Nelson Corporation
- New Mills Urban District Council
- Newton-le-Willows Urban District Council
- North Cheshire and District Gas Company
- Northwich Gas Company
- Oldham Corporation
- Ormskirk District Gas Company
- Oswaldtwistle Urban District Council
- Padiham Urban District Council
- Poulton-le-Fylde Urban District Council
- Prescot and District Gas Company
- Preston Gas Company
- Radcliffe, Farnworth and District Gas Company
- Ramsbottom Gas Company
- Rochdale Corporation
- Rossendale Union Gas Company
- Runcorn and District Gas Company
- St. Helens Corporation
- Salford Corporation
- Sandbach Gas Company
- Sedbergh New Gas Company
- Skelmersdale Urban District Council
- Southport Corporation
- Stalybridge Corporation
- Stockport Corporation
- Stretford and District Gas Board
- Thornton Cleveleys Urban District Council
- Tyldesley Urban District Council
- Ulverston Urban District Council
- United Kingdom Gas Corporation
- Wallasey Corporation
- Warrington Corporation
- Westhoughton Consumers Gas Company
- Whitchurch (Salop) Gas Company
- Widnes Corporation
- Wigan Corporation
- Wilmslow and Alderley Edge Gas Company
- Windermere Urban District Council
- Winsford Gas Company
- Withnell Urban District Council
- Worsley Urban District Council

== See also ==
- Gas board
