= MV Ardingly =

History

United Kingdom
- Name: MV Ardingly
- Operator: Stephenson Clarke Shipping, Newcastle upon Tyne
- Builder: SP Austin & Son Ltd, Southwick, Sunderland
- Yard number: 406
- Launched: 25 October 1950
- Completed: 1951
- Acquired: 1951
- Out of service: 1971
- Fate: Sold

United Kingdom
- Name: MV Ballyrobert
- Operator: John Kelly, Belfast
- Acquired: 1971
- Out of service: 1977
- Identification: IMO number: 5022778
- Fate: Sold

Cyprus
- Name: MV Lucky Trader
- Acquired: 1977
- Out of service: 1982
- Identification: IMO number: 5022778
- Fate: Scrapped at Piraeus, Greece, 1982

General characteristics
- Class & type: Coaster
- Tonnage: 1,473 GRT; 1,930 long tons (2,160 short tons; 1,960 t) deadweight
- Length: 240 ft 0 in (73.15 m)
- Beam: 36 ft 4 in (11.07 m)
- Draught: 20 ft 0 in (6.10 m)
- Capacity: 1,860 long tons (2,080 short tons; 1,890 t)

MV Ardingly was a coaster built in 1951 as a collier for Stephenson Clarke Shipping. She carried coal from North East England to ports in Southern England until this trade declined early in the 1960s. Stephenson Clarke then transferred her to carrying bulk cargoes including limestone and grain.

Many Stephenson Clarke ships were named after places in South East England. MV Ardingly may have been so named because one Stephenson Clarke director, Mr. P.G. Wallace, had been a pupil at Ardingly College in 1909.

In 1971 Stephenson Clarke sold her and a sister ship, MV Steyning, to John Kelly in Northern Ireland. Kelly renamed her MV Ballyrobert after the village of Ballyrobert in County Antrim.

In 1977 Kelly sold her to a Cypriot operator who renamed her MV Lucky Trader. She was sold for scrap and broken up in Piraeus near Athens 1982.
