= East Midlands Gas Board =

Former UK state-owed utility

State-owned utility overview
- Formed: 1 May 1949
- Dissolved: 1 January 1973
- Type: Gas board
- Status: Dissolved
- Headquarters: Leicester

The East Midlands Gas Board was a state-owned utility area gas board providing gas for light and heat to industries and homes in Lincolnshire, Nottinghamshire, Rutland and parts of Bedfordshire, Buckinghamshire, Derbyshire, Leicestershire, Northamptonshire, Staffordshire and the West Riding of Yorkshire.

It was established on 1 May 1949 under the terms of the Gas Act 1948, and dissolved in 1973 when it became a region of the newly formed British Gas Corporation, British Gas East Midlands, as a result of the Gas Act 1972.

== Existing gas suppliers taken over ==
Under the Gas (Allocation of Undertakings to Area Boards and Gas Council) Order 1949 (SI 1949/742), the East Midlands Gas Board took over existing local authority and privately owned gas production and supply utilities in its area:

- Alford Gas Company
- Alfreton Gas Company
- Ambergate, Crich, Bull Bridge and Fritchley Gas-Light and Coke Company
- Ashbourne Urban District Council
- Ashby-de-la-Zouch Gas Company
- Barrow-upon-Humber Gas Company
- Barton Gas Company
- Bingham Gas Light and Coke Company
- Bolsover Gaslight and Coke Company
- Boston Gaslight and Coke Company
- Bottesford Gas Works
- Bourne Urban District Council
- Brigg Urban District Council
- Burton-upon-Trent Corporation
- Caistor Gas and Coke Company
- Clay Cross Gas Company
- Chesterfield Corporation
- Cleethorpes Gas Company
- Cudworth Urban District Council
- Daventry Gas Company
- Derby Gas Light and Coke Company
- Desborough Gas Company
- Doncaster Corporation
- East Midlands Electricity Board
- East Retford Corporation
- Epworth Gas Company
- Finedon Gas Company
- Gainsborough Urban District Council
- Grantham Gas Company
- Great Grimsby Gas Company
- Great Wigston Gas Company
- Hathersage and District Gas Company
- Heckington Gas Company
- Horncastle Urban District Council
- Ilkeston Corporation
- Kegworth Gas Light and Coke Company
- Kettering Gas Company
- Kibworth Gas Company
- Kirkby-in-Ashfield Urban District Council
- Kirton Gas Company
- Kirton-in-Lindsey Gas Light and Coke Company
- Leicester Corporation
- Lincoln Corporation
- Long Eaton Gas Company
- Long Sutton and Sutton Bridge Gas Company
- Loughborough Corporation
- Louth Gaslight Company
- Lutterworth Gas Light and Coke Company
- Mablethorpe and Sutton Gas Company
- Mansfield Corporation
- Market Deeping Gas Light and Coke Company
- Market Harborough Urban District Council
- Market Rasen New Lighting Company
- Measham Gas Works
- Melbourne Gas Light and Coke Company
- Melton Mowbray Gas Light and Coke Company
- Misterton and West Stockwith Gas Company
- Newark Corporation
- Northampton Gaslight Company
- Nottingham Corporation
- Oundle Gas Light and Coke Company
- Penistone and District Gas Company
- Rawmarsh Urban District Council
- Riddings District Gas Company
- Ripley Gas Company
- Rotherham Corporation
- Rothwell Urban District Council
- Rushden District Gas Company
- Scunthorpe Corporation
- Sheffield and District Gas Company
- Shepshed Urban District Council
- Shirebrook and District Gas Company
- Shirland Gas Company
- Sileby Gas-Light and Coke Company
- Shireoaks Colliery Company
- Skegness Urban District Council
- Sleaford Gas Company
- South Normanton and Blackwell Gas Company
- Southwell District Gas Company
- South Yorkshire and Derbyshire Gas Company
- South Yorkshire Gas Grid Company
- Spalding Urban District Council
- Spilsby Gas Company
- Stamford and St. Martins (Stamford Baron) Gas Light and Coke Company
- Stocksbridge Gas Company
- Stony Stratford Gas and Coke Company
- Sutton-in-Ashfield Urban District Council
- Swadlincote District Urban District Council
- Swinton and Mexborough Gas Board
- Thrapston Gas Company
- Tideswell Gas Light and Coke Company
- Uppingham Gas Light and Coke Company
- Wath Bolton and Thurnscoe Gas Board
- Wellingborough Gas Light Company
- Winterton Gas Company
- Wirksworth Gas Light and Coke Company
- Wombwell Urban District Council
- Woodhall Spa Gas Company
- Worksop Gas Company

== See also ==
- Gas board
