= Gas board =

Area gas boards
- Company type: Nationalised companies (controlled by HM Government and reporting to the Ministry of Power)
- Industry: Utilities (energy: gas)
- Predecessor: 1812 (as the Gas Light and Coke Company and various others)
- Founded: 1 May 1949 (by the Gas Act 1948)
- Defunct: 31 December 1972
- Fate: Reorganisation under the Gas Act 1972
- Successor: British Gas Corporation (by the Gas Act 1972)
- Area served: Great Britain
- Key people: Board members
- Products: Coal gas, natural gas
- Services: Gas and coke supply

The area gas boards were created under the provisions of the Gas Act 1948 enacted by Clement Attlee's post-war Labour government. The act nationalised the British gas industry and also created the Gas Council.

== History ==
From the early 19th century the gas supply industry in the United Kingdom was mainly operated by local authorities and private companies. A flammable gas (known as "town gas" or "coal gas") was piped to commercial, domestic and industrial customers for use as a fuel and for lighting. It was marketed to consumers by such means as the National Gas Congress and Exhibition in 1913. The gas used in the 19th and early 20th centuries was coal gas but in the period 1967–77 coal gas supplies were replaced by natural gas, first discovered in the UK North Sea in 1965.

=== Nationalisation ===
In 1948 Clement Attlee's Labour government reshaped the gas industry, enacting the Gas Act 1948. The act nationalised the UK gas industry and 1,064 privately owned and municipal gas companies were merged into twelve area gas boards each a separate body with its own management structure. Under the Gas Act 1948 the area boards were charged with three duties:

1. To develop and maintain an efficient, co-ordinated and economical system of gas supply for their areas and to satisfy, so far as it is economic to do so, all reasonable demands for gas within their area.
2. To develop and maintain the efficient, co-ordinated and economical production of coke, other than metallurgical coke.
3. To develop and maintain efficient methods of recovering by-products obtained in the process of manufacturing gas.

=== Management board ===
The management board for each area board typically comprised:

- Chairman
- Deputy chairman
- Chief engineer
- Controller of research
- Controller of services
- Commercial manager
- Public relations officer
- Secretary
- Chief accountant
- Staff controller

The chairman of each area board was a member of the Gas Council. Each area board was divided into geographical groups or divisions which were often further divided into smaller districts. These boards simply became known as the "gas board", a term people still use when referring to British Gas, the company that replaced the boards when the Gas Act 1972 was passed. The area boards became regions of the British Gas Corporation.

=== Area gas boards ===
The areas and existing companies were assigned to the gas board by the Gas (Allocation of Undertakings to Area Boards and Gas Council) Order 1949 (SI 1949/742):

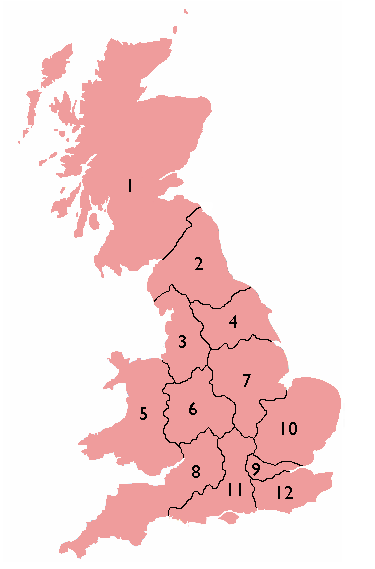
Map of gas area boards

No.	Name of area board	Coverage of area
1	Scottish Gas Board	Scotland
2	Northern Gas Board	Durham, Northumberland and parts of Cumberland, Westmorland and the North Riding of Yorkshire
3	North Western Gas Board	Lancashire and parts of Cheshire, Cumberland, Derbyshire, Shropshire, Westmorland and the West Riding of Yorkshire
4	North-Eastern Gas Board	The East Riding of Yorkshire and parts of the North and West Ridings of Yorkshire (including York)
5	Wales Gas Board	Wales
6	West Midlands Gas Board	Parts of Cheshire, Herefordshire, Leicestershire, Shropshire, Staffordshire, Warwickshire (including Birmingham) and Worcestershire
7	East Midlands Gas Board	Lincolnshire, Nottinghamshire, Rutland and parts of Bedfordshire, Buckinghamshire, Derbyshire, Leicestershire, Northamptonshire, Staffordshire and the West Riding of Yorkshire
8	South Western Gas Board	Cornwall (including the Isles of Scilly), Gloucestershire and parts of Berkshire, Devon, Herefordshire, Oxfordshire, Somerset, Warwickshire, Wiltshire and Worcestershire
9	North Thames Gas Board	Parts of the administrative County of London and of Berkshire, Buckinghamshire, Essex, Hertfordshire, Middlesex and Surrey
10	Eastern Gas Board	Cambridgeshire, Huntingdonshire, the Isle of Ely, Norfolk, the Soke of Peterborough, Suffolk and parts of Bedfordshire, Buckinghamshire, Essex, Hertfordshire and Middlesex
11	Southern Gas Board	Dorset, Hampshire, the Isle of Wight and parts of Bedfordshire, Berkshire, Buckinghamshire, Devon, Hertfordshire, Northamptonshire, Oxfordshire, Somerset, Surrey, Sussex and Wiltshire
12	South Eastern Gas Board	Kent, and parts of the administrative County of London and of Middlesex, Surrey and Sussex
