= Wandsworth and District Gas Company =

The Wandsworth and District Gas Company was a maker and distributor of coal gas in southwest London from 1834 until 1949.

== History ==
Wandsworth and Putney Gas Act 1856
- Act of Parliament
- Parliament of the United Kingdom
- Long title: An Act to incorporate "The Wandsworth and Putney Gaslight and Coke Company," and for other Purposes.
- Citation: 19 & 20 Vict. c. lxii

Dates
- Royal assent: 30 June 1856

Text of statute as originally enacted

Wandsworth and Putney Gas Act 1880
- Act of Parliament
- Parliament of the United Kingdom
- Long title: An Act to authorise the Wandsworth and Putney Gaslight and Coke Company to raise further Capital; and for other purposes.
- Citation: 43 & 44 Vict. c. lxxii

Dates
- Royal assent: 19 July 1880

Other legislation
- Repealed by: Wandsworth, Wimbledon and Epsom District Gas Act 1912

Status: Repealed

Text of statute as originally enacted

Wandsworth and Putney Gas Act 1900
- Act of Parliament
- Parliament of the United Kingdom
- Long title: An Act to convert the capital of the Wandsworth and Putney Gaslight and Coke Company to raise additional capital to construct works and for other purposes.
- Citation: 63 & 64 Vict. c. ccxliv

Dates
- Royal assent: 6 August 1900

Other legislation
- Repealed by: Wandsworth, Wimbledon and Epsom District Gas Act 1912

Status: Repealed

The Wandsworth gasworks was built in 1834 on the Surrey bank of the River Thames near Wandsworth Bridge. Its supplied Wandsworth, Putney and part of Battersea. The undertaking became the Wandsworth and Putney Gaslight and Coke Company in 1854 and was incorporated by an act of Parliament, the Wandsworth and Putney Gas Act 1856 (19 & 20 Vict. c. lxii).

Wandsworth, Wimbledon and Epsom District Gas Act 1912
- Act of Parliament
- Parliament of the United Kingdom
- Long title: An Act for amalgamating the Wandsworth and Putney Gaslight and Coke Company the Mitcham and Wimbledon District Gaslight Company and the Epsom and Ewell Gas Company and for other purposes.
- Citation: 2 & 3 Geo. 5. c. xlvii

Dates
- Royal assent: 7 August 1912

Other legislation
- Repeals/revokes: Wandsworth and Putney Gas Act 1900

Text of statute as originally enacted

In 1912 the company merged with the Mitcham and Wimbledon District Gaslight Company and the Epsom and Ewell Gas Company to form the Wandsworth, Wimbledon and Epsom District Gas Company. In 1924 it bought land at Worcester Park to build more gas holders.

In 1931 the company took over the Kingston upon Thames Gas Company and the Sutton Gas Company and retitled itself the Wandsworth and District Gas Company. In 1936 it took over the Leatherhead Gas and Lighting Company and the Walton upon Thames and Weybridge Gas Company.

In 1949 the Wandsworth and District Gas Company was nationalised under the Gas Act 1948 and became part of the West Surrey Division of the South Eastern Gas Board.

== Colliers ==
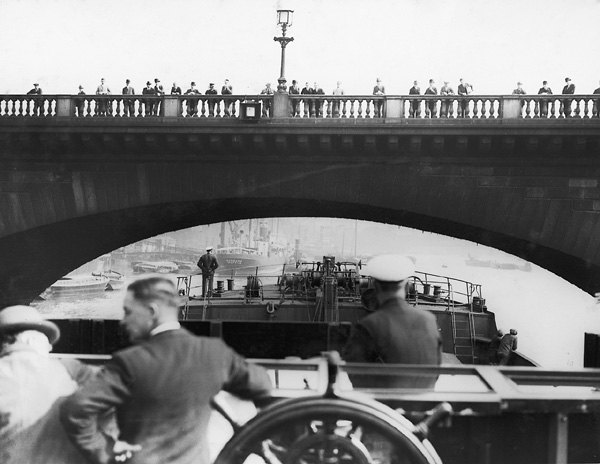
View from the bridge of Ewell on 22 September 1926, with her wheelhouse and mast lowered to pass under London Bridge

Coal was brought by coastal colliers from North East England and unloaded by cranes on pontoons on the Thames beside the gasworks. The colliers were flatirons in order to fit under the Thames bridges upriver from the Pool of London to Wandsworth.

The company's ships had brown upper works above hull level. The funnel was black with a broad white band edged with a narrow red band above and below, and the broad white band was emblazoned with the initials "W&D GAS Co". The house flag was red with the initials "W.G.C." in white capitals.

=== Fleet ===
In 1906 the company bought its own flatiron, Radcliffe, which had capacity for about 1,050 long tons of coal.

In 1909 W. Dobson & Co of Newcastle-upon-Tyne built an 889 GRT flatiron collier for the gas company. She was named Wandle, the first of three colliers in the company's service to carry that name. On 29 April 1916 in the North Sea about 15 miles (24 km) south-east of Souter Point near Whitburn, County Durham the U-boat SM UB-27 opened fire on her with its deck gun. As UB-27 was on the surface Wandle engaged her. At the time it was believed Wandle had sunk the submarine and the Master, G.E.A. Mastin, and his crew were celebrated in Britain. However, UB-27 survived the engagement and was not lost until July 1917.

In 1916 John Crown & Sons Ltd of Sunderland built the 1,873 GRT flatiron Lightfoot for the gas company. In 1918 she was sold to the Witherington and Everett Steam Ship Company of Newcastle-upon-Tyne. On 16 March 1918 Lightfoot was in the English Channel en route from London to Barry when the German submarine SM UB-30 torpedoed and sank her two miles south of the Owers Lightship off Selsey Bill.

In 1922 the Burntisland Shipbuilding Company of Fife, Scotland launched a 932 GRT flatiron for the gas company. She was named Wandle to replace the 1909 vessel. In 1932 she was sold to Stephenson Clarke & Associated Companies who renamed her Pitwines.

In 1923 Burntisland launched three barges for the gas company: the 180 ft (55 m) Southfield in February, Springfield in March and the 150 ft (46 m) Beverley in May.

In 1924 Burntisland launched the 1,527 GRT flatiron Woodcote for the gas company. In 1934 she was sold to Stephenson Clarke, who renamed her Cerne.

In 1926 Burntisland launched the 1,350 GRT flatiron Ewell in May and completed her in July. In 1949 she passed to the SEGB fleet and in 1958 she was sold to new owners in Ravenna, Italy who converted her into a grain lighter and renamed her Candiano.

In 1930 Burntisland launched the 1,351 GRT flatiron Tolworth for the gas company. In 1949 she passed to the SEGB fleet and in 1958 she was sold to new owners in Ravenna, Italy who converted her into a harbour pontoon and renamed her S Apolinare.

In 1931 Burntisland launched the 327 GRT barge Kingston for the gas company.

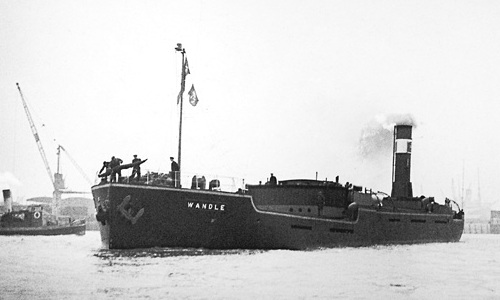
Wandle steams up the Thames on her maiden voyage, 30 October 1932

In 1932 Burntisland launched a 1,482 GRT flatiron for the gas company. She became the third Wandle, after her predecessor who was sold to Stephenson Clarke that same year. On 9 November 1942 an E-boat torpedoed her in the North Sea off Lowestoft, almost completely blowing off her bow. One of her gunners was killed but she remained afloat and the next day was towed to Yarmouth and beached. She was then towed into South Shields and dry-docked, a new bow was built onto her and on 8 April 1943 she was ready to return to service. In 1949 she passed to the SEGB fleet and in 1959 she was towed to Rotterdam and scrapped.

In 1937 Burntisland launched the 1,597 GRT flatiron Wimbledon for the gas company. In 1949 she passed to the SEGB fleet. On 31 October 1956 the sea broke through her hatch covers and she sank about 4 nautical miles (7 km) off Blakeney in Norfolk. One crew member was killed.

In January 1946 Burntisland launched the 1,720 GRT flatiron Chessington for the gas company. In 1949 she passed to the SEGB fleet and in 1966 she was sold to new owners in Gothenburg, Sweden who converted her into a storage hulk.

In April 1946 Burntisland launched a motor ship, the 1,787 GRT flatiron Mitcham, for the gas company. In 1949 she passed to the SEGB fleet and in 1969 she was sold to new owners in the Cayman Islands who renamed her Tortugas. In 1974 she was sold again to new owners in Piraeus, Greece and in 1975 she sank in a gale about 30 nautical miles (56 km) southwest of Santorini in the Mediterranean.

== Sources ==
- Central Office of Information; Ministry of Transport (1947). British Coaster: The Official Story. London: His Majesty's Stationery Office. pp. 53–56.
- Harnack, Edwin P (1938) [1903]. All About Ships & Shipping (7th ed.). London: Faber and Faber. pp. 612–614, plate 44.
- Talbot-Booth, E.C. (1942). Ships and the Sea (Seventh ed.). London: Sampson Low, Marston & Co. Ltd. p. 733.
