= South Eastern Gas Board =

Former UK state-owed utility

State-owned utility overview
- Formed: 1 May 1949
- Dissolved: 1 January 1973
- Type: Gas board
- Status: Dissolved
- Headquarters: Katharine Street, Croydon

The South Eastern Gas Board was a state-owned utility area gas board providing gas for light and heat to industries and homes in Kent, and parts of the administrative County of London and of Middlesex, Surrey and Sussex.

It was established on 1 May 1949 under the terms of the Gas Act 1948 and dissolved in 1973 when it became a region of the newly formed British Gas Corporation, British Gas South Eastern, as a result of the Gas Act 1972.

== Existing gas suppliers taken over ==
Under the Gas (Allocation of Undertakings to Area Boards and Gas Council) Order 1949 (SI 1949/742), the South Eastern Gas Board took over existing local authority and privately owned gas production and supply utilities in its area:

- Arundel Gas Company
- Ashford Urban District Council
- Ash next Sandwich Gas Light, Coal, and Coke Company
- Associated Gas and Water Undertakings
- Bexhill Corporation
- Brighton Hove and Worthing Gas Company
- Broadstairs Gas Company
- Burgess Hill and St. John's Common Gas Company
- Canterbury Gas and Water Company
- Charing and District Gas Works
- Cranbrook Gas Company
- Croydon Gas Company
- Deal and Walmer Gas Company
- Dover Gas Company
- Eastbourne Gas Company
- East Grinstead Gas and Water Company
- East Kent Gas Company
- East Surrey Gas Company
- Edenbridge and District Gas Company
- Faversham Gas Company
- Folkestone Gas and Coke Company
- Godalming Gas and Coke Company
- Gravesend and Milton Gas Light Company
- Guildford Gas Light and Coke Company
- Hampton Court Gas Company
- Hassocks and District Gas Company
- Hastings and St. Leonards Gas Company
- Hawkhurst Gas Company
- Haywards Heath District Gas Company
- Heathfield Gas Company
- Herne Bay Gas Company
- Horley District Gas Company
- Horsham Gas Company
- Isle of Thanet Gas Light and Coke Company
- Lewes Gas Company Maidstone Gas Company
- Mid-Kent Gaslight and Coke Company
- Newhaven Gas and Coke Company
- New Romney Gas Light and Coke Company
- Ramsgate Corporation
- Rochester, Chatham and Gillingham Gas Company
- Rye Gas and Coke Company
- Sandwich Corporation
- Sheppy Gas Company
- Sittingbourne District Gas Company
- Sittingbourne and Milton Urban District Council
- South Eastern Electricity Board
- South Eastern Gas Corporation
- South Metropolitan Gas Company
- South Suburban Gas Company
- Steyning Gas Company
- Tenterden and District Gas Company
- Tunbridge Wells Gas Company
- Wadhurst and District Gas and Coke Company
- Wandsworth and District Gas Company
- Wateringbury Gas Company
- Westerham Gas and Coke Company
- Westgate and Birchington Gas and Electricity Company
- Whitstable Gas and Coke Company
- Woking District Gas Company

== See also ==
- Gas board
