= Northern Gas Board =

Former UK state-owed utility

State-owned utility overview
- Formed: 1 May 1949
- Dissolved: 1 January 1973
- Type: Gas board
- Status: Dissolved
- Headquarters: Killingworth, Newcastle-upon-Tyne

The Northern Gas Board was a state-owned utility area gas board providing gas for light and heat to industries and homes in Durham, Northumberland and parts of Cumberland, Westmorland and the North Riding of Yorkshire.

It was established on 1 May 1949 under the terms of the Gas Act 1948, and dissolved in 1973 when it became a region of the newly formed British Gas Corporation, British Gas Northern, as a result of the Gas Act 1972.

== Existing gas suppliers taken over ==
Under the Gas (Allocation of Undertakings to Area Boards and Gas Council) Order 1949 (SI 1949/742), the North Western Gas Board took over existing local authority and privately owned gas production and supply utilities in its area:

- Alnwick Gas Company
- Alston Gas Company
- Amble and Warkworth Gas Light and Coke Company
- Annfield Plain and District Gas Company
- Appleby Corporation
- Aspatria Gas Light Company
- Barnard Castle Gas Company
- Bedale Gas Company
- Berwick and Tweedmouth Gas Light Company
- Bishop Auckland District Gas Company
- Blyth Gas Company Brampton Gas Light and Coke Company
- Brotton Gas Light and Coke Company
- Carlisle Corporation
- Cockermouth Urban District Council
- Cleveland Gas Company
- City of Durham Gas Company
- Corbridge Gas Company
- Crook Gas Company
- Darlington Corporation
- Ennerdale Rural District Council
- Guisborough Gas Company
- Haltwhistle Gas Light Company
- Hartlepool Gas and Water Company
- Hexham Gas Company
- Houghton-le-Spring District Gas Company
- Keswick Gas Company
- Kirby Stephen Gas Company
- Maryport Urban District Council
- Masham Rural District Council
- Middlesbrough Corporation
- Newbiggin-by-the-Sea Gas Company
- Newcastle-upon-Tyne and Gateshead Gas Company
- Northallerton Consumers' Gas Company
- Penrith Urban District Council
- Redcar Corporation
- Richmond (Yorks) Corporation
- Rothbury Gas and Coke Company
- Seascale Gas Company
- Shotley Bridge and Consett District Gas Company
- South Bank and Normanby Gaslight and Coke Company
- Spennymoor and Tudhoe Gas Company
- Stanhope Gas and Water Company
- Stanley and District Gas Company
- Stockton-on-Tees Corporation
- Sunderland Gas Company
- Tudhoe and Sunderland Bridge Gas Company
- Whitehaven United Gas Company
- Wigton Gas Light and Coke Company
- Wigton Rural District Council
- Wooler Gas Company
- Workington Corporation

== See also ==
- Gas board
