= National Gas Congress and Exhibition =

The National Gas Congress and Exhibition was held in the International Exhibition Halls, Shepherd's Bush, London from 1 October to 1 November 1913.

The object of the National Gas Congress and Exhibition is to lay before the public - by actual demonstration, by photographs and pictures, and by the spoken and written word - the facts as to the stage of development which the Gas Industry has reached, and the services which it is capable of rendering to all branches of the community, at the end of the first Century of its existence and of Fifty years of work by its representative technical organisation - the Institution of Gas Engineers.

— Corbet Woodall, The National Gas Congress and Exhibition Official Guide and Programme, page 4 (note capitals placed as per programme)

The exhibition displayed examples of the best gas fittings of the day in mock rooms representing a large and a small town house, "unusually" mixing manufacturers' products in the spaces rather than having individual trade stands for competing companies. The exhibition catalogue guides the visitor around the seven halls detailing all of the gas powered objects on show. These included ovens, cookers, toasters, tea boilers, irons, fires, radiators, towel rails, cigar lighters, and a wide variety of lights including lamps, table lamps, pendents.

The event was targeted at promoting gas to "... all classes of visitor - the practical housewife and the housewife-to-be; the chemist; the technical; the factory owner; the social worker; the artisan; the domestic servant; the doctor; the architect - in short all who need artificial warmth, light or power; and to those whom they look for guidance as to how best to obtain those necessaries of life." Conferences and lectures were run by experts to explain various aspects of Gas to non-technical visitors in order to make "... subjects as well as objects of interest...."

Demonstrations of cookery using gas ran every day of the exhibition and members of the public were invited to participate in competitions for monetary prizes of 10 shillings for first prize or £2 for competitions sending in dishes prepared at home, whilst every competitor received 2 or 5 shillings to cover their travel expenses. The catalogue also advertises a competition to write an essay on " - from the Housewife's point of view, or the advantages of cooking by Gas - from the Cook's point of view", with a maximum prize of £10 and a similar competition for children to write about what they learned about gas at the exhibition.
