= Stephenson Clarke Shipping =

British shipping company

Stephenson Clarke Shipping Limited
- House flag
- Type: Private company limited by shares
- Industry: Ship transport
- Founded: 1730
- Defunct: 2012
- Headquarters: Newcastle Upon Tyne, England
- Website: Stephenson Clarke Shipping Limited

Stephenson Clarke Shipping Limited, established in 1730 is Great Britain's oldest shipping company. The company specializes in short sea bulk cargo such as aggregates, alumina, grain, coal, fertilizers and steel.

== History ==
Reverend Ralph Clarke, a vicar of Long Benton, Tyneside had two sons, Ralph and Robert Clarke. The boys went to sea, working their way up to being master mariners.

During their career at sea, they began to buy shares in ships, gradually making the transition from captain to owner. The company that would become Stephenson Clarke was formed when the brothers bought shares in a 300-ton sailing vessel. Thus the business was established in 1730, in the early years of the reign of King George II.

Stephenson Clarke managed other owners' ships as well as its own. For several decades it managed the collier fleets of the Gas Light and Coke Company and other gas and electricity utility companies.

The company went into liquidation in 2012.

== Notable former ships ==
SS Wandle was a 932 GRT flatiron coastal collier launched by the Burntisland Shipbuilding Company of Burntisland, Fife, Scotland in 1924 for the Wandsworth, Wimbledon, Epsom and District Gas Company. Stephenson Clarke bought her in 1932 and renamed her Pitwines. On 11 January 1940 she survived being bombed and machine-gunned by enemy aircraft in the North Sea about 25 miles (40 km) off Flamborough Head. On 11 November 1941 she survived an attack by enemy aircraft off Yarmouth. On 19 November 1941 she was involved in a collision off West Hartlepool with the 744 GRT coaster SS Gateshead and sank about 7 miles (11 km) northeast of Heugh.

SS Pulborough was a 960 GRT coaster launched by Burntisland Shipbuilding Co. in 1933. On 29 July 1940 she was caught in an air raid off the Kent coast in the Straits of Dover. A bomb exploded close to her in the sea, opening up several plates in her hull. Her crew managed to launch a lifeboat and abandon ship as she sank.

SS Petworth was a 972 GRT coaster launched by Burntisland Shipbuilding Co. in 1934. She was sold to new owners in 1957 who renamed her Belvedere. She was broken up in 1960.

SS Woodcote was a 1,527 GRT flatiron coastal collier launched by Burntisland Shipbuilding Co. in 1924 for the Wandsworth, Wimbledon, Epsom and District Gas Company. Stephenson Clarke bought her in 1934 and renamed her Cerne. She was broken up at Dunston-on-Tyne in 1955.

SS Horsted was a 1,670 GRT coaster launched by Burntisland Shipbuilding Co. in 1936. On 4 December 1939 she was in an east coast convoy in the North Sea when she suffered an explosion caused by either a torpedo or a mine. She sank with the loss of five of her crew.

SS Portslade was a GRT coaster built by William Pickersgill & Sons Ltd of Sunderland in 1936. On 25 July 1940 while sailing in a convoy in the English Channel she was bombed by enemy aircraft and sunk east of Dungeness.

SS Burstow was a 927 GRT coaster launched by John Lewis & Co of Aberdeen in 1927. She was sold in 1931 to new owners who named her Nephrite. Stephenson Clarke bought her in 1946 and renamed her Portslade to replace the vessel sunk in 1940. In 1954 Stephenson Clarke sold her to new owners who renamed her Rosefleet. She foundered in a gale at Mardyck in northern France in 1956.

MV Minster was a 3,194 GRT coaster launched by Burntisland Shipbuilding Co. in March 1950. She was lengthened from 335 feet (102 m) to 375 feet (114 m) in 1964, which increased her to 3,647 GRT. She was sold to Cypriot owners in 1971 who renamed her Elandi. She was renamed three more times in the next five years and was still trading in 1976.

MV Emsworth was a 1,784 GRT coaster launched by Burntisland Shipbuilding Co. in September 1950. She was sold to Cypriot owners in 1971 who renamed her Andora. She was broken up in 1976.

MV Ardingly was a 1,436 GRT coaster launched by SP Austin & Son Ltd of Southwick, Sunderland in 1951. She was sold to new owners in 1971 who renamed her Ballyrobert. She was sold again in 1977 to Cypriot owners who renamed her Lucky Trader. She was scrapped in 1982.

MV Storrington was a 3,809 GRT coaster launched by Burntisland Shipbuilding Co. in 1959. She was sold to Cypriot owners in 1978 who renamed her Milos II.

MV Gilsland was a 7,242 GRT cargo ship launched by Burntisland Shipbuilding Co. in 1961. She was sold to Argentinian owners in 1968 who renamed her Mardulce. She was sold again in 1975 to Bangladeshi owners who renamed her Banglar Joy.

== Recent fleet developments ==
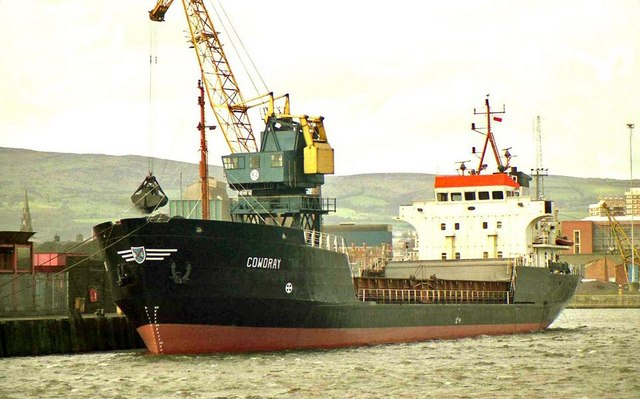
MV Cowdray at Belfast

In 2008, the Stephenson Clarke fleet consisted of 10 bulk carriers with a combined capacity of 68,238 tonnes deadweight (DWT). The ships have an average age of 21 years. The ships are small minibulkers having between one and four holds apiece and shallow draft for accessing more ports. They range in size from the Ardent with a capacity of only 1,180 DWT to the Dallington of 12,138 DWT.

All ships are single deck bulk carriers with open hatches and open holds. Several are small self load/unloading vessels of between 1,180 DWT to 9,000 DWT. These vessels often have self-unloading gears and equipped with small tractors.

The fleet is capable of worldwide operations and focuses on operations in Northern Europe, including the Mediterranean Sea, the Black Sea, West Africa, Macaronesia, Scandinavia and the Baltic Sea. The company stated that keeping the ships in this area increased operational flexibility and efficiency.
