= Collier (ship) =

Bulk cargo ship to carry coal

A collier is a bulk cargo ship designed or used to carry coal. Early evidence of coal being transported by sea includes use of coal in London in 1306. In the fourteenth and fifteenth centuries, coal was shipped from the River Tyne to London and other destinations. Other ports also exported coal – for instance the Old Quay in Whitehaven harbour was built in 1634 for the loading of coal. London became highly reliant on the delivery of coal by sea – Samuel Pepys expressed concern in the winter of 1666–67 that war with the Dutch would prevent a fleet of 200 colliers getting through. In 1795, 4,395 cargoes of coal were delivered to London. (Note: At an average of 8 or 9 trips per year by each collier, this represents a fleet of about 500 colliers working the route from the Tyne to London.) By 1824, this number had risen to about 7,000; by 1839, it was over 9,000. The trade continued to the end of the twentieth century, with the last cargo of coal leaving the Port of Tyne in February, 2021.

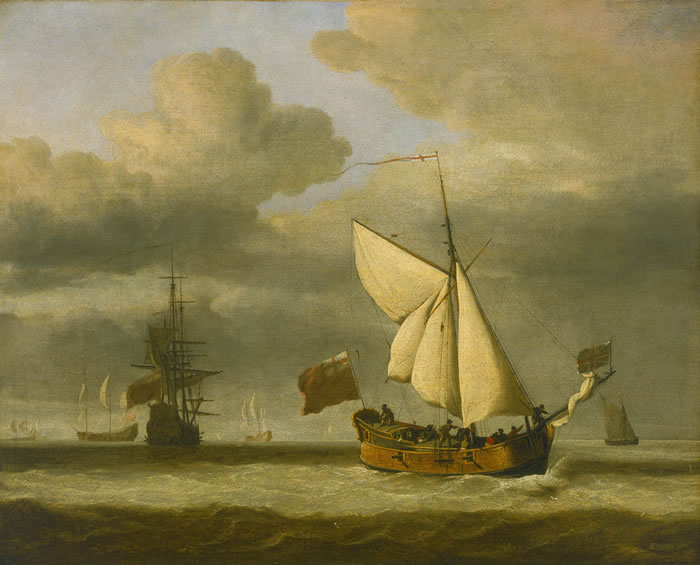
The royal yacht Royal Escape, formerly a collier called Surprise, built before 1651

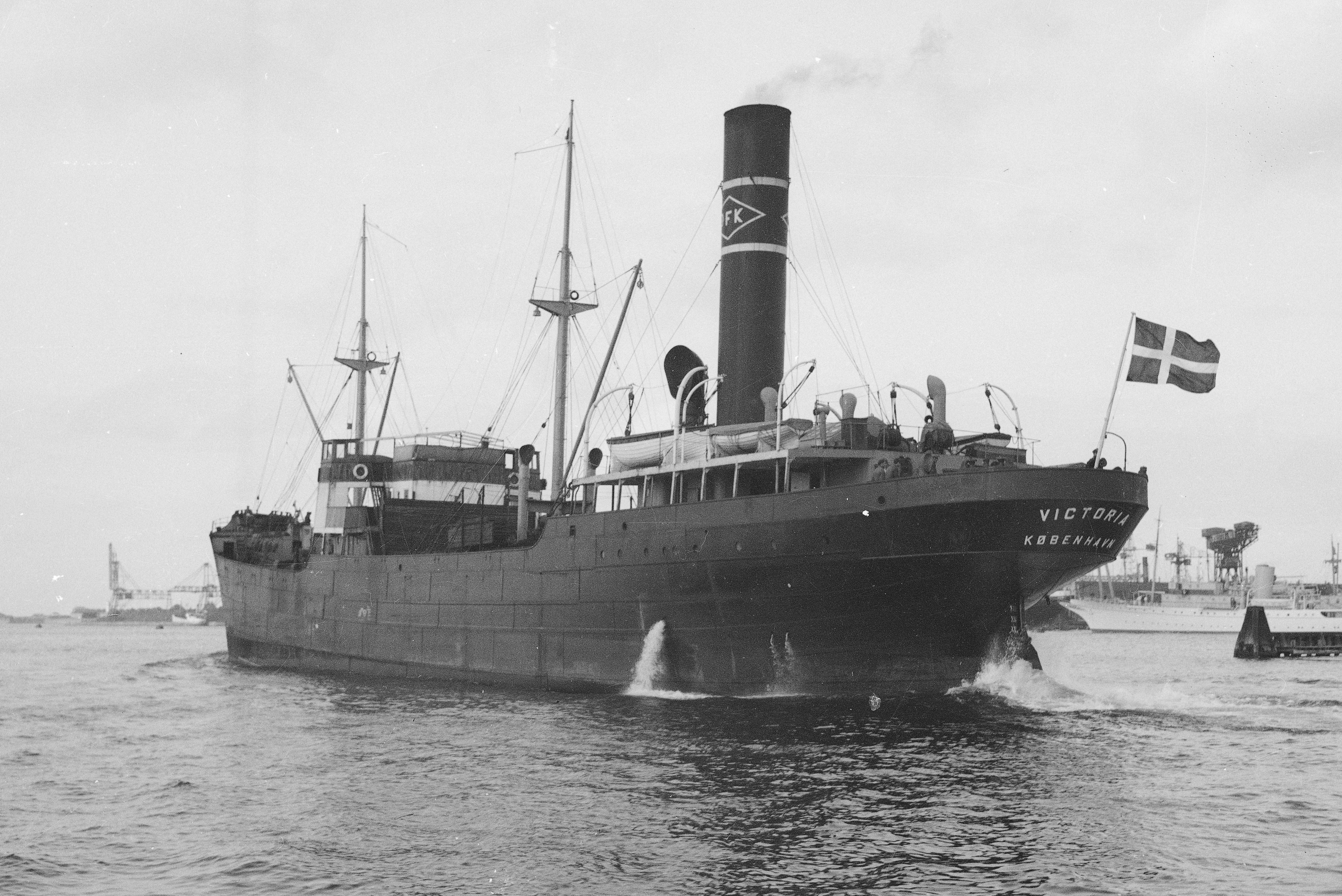
Victoria, a steam powered collier built in 1924

The earliest type of collier on which there is detailed information is the Whitby-built cat. These were bluff-bowed, round-sterned, strongly-built ships that were in common use from the ports of Northeast England in the second half of the eighteenth century. Examples were used as research and exploration ships by the Royal Navy – the best known being HMS Endeavour. In the first half of the nineteenth century, collier brigs were the most common type and remained popular with Northeast coast shipowners. Elsewhere, sailing competition in the latter part of the century was from schooners and other vessels with fore and aft rig. The first steam collier, John Bowes, was launched in 1852 and proved successful, with many others being built as a result. Sailing and steam colliers co-existed for the remainder of the nineteenth century and into the twentieth, with coal being carried by sailing vessels at the time of the First World War.

== Coals from Newcastle ==
For many years, the Durham and Northumberland coalfields supplied a rapidly expanding London with vast tonnages of coal, and a large fleet of coastal colliers travelled up and down the east coast of England loaded with "black diamonds". Sir Charles Palmer pioneered the construction of iron-hulled steam colliers at his Jarrow shipyard, which began to rapidly replace the earlier wooden ships. This inadvertently led to the eventual decline of the glassmaking industry on Tyneside and Wearside, as prior to this, they had had access to large supplies of sand, used as ballast in the wooden colliers returning from London. The iron colliers had ballast tanks which meant water could simply be pumped in, greatly reducing the turnaround time as the sand no longer needed to be loaded and unloaded. Coal was also exported to Europe, and wooden colliers returned with goods such as roofing tiles in their holds. The first Palmer-built iron hulled steam collier was SS John Bowes of 1852. There had been an earlier iron hull screw propelled collier, the short-lived SS Bedlington of 1841 built in South Shields.

A notable incident involving a collier occurred not long after the opening of the Victoria Tunnel in Newcastle. The hemp rope which controlled the speed of wagons descending the tunnel to the river from Spital Tongues Colliery snapped, and some of the wagons landed in the Tyne while others lodged on the deck of a vessel being loaded. The wagons were recovered at low tide, the rope was repaired, and the papers of the day treated the whole incident as something of a joke. Six months later, the rope snapped again, and the wagons landed in the hold of a waiting collier and sank it. After this, it was decided a wire rope would be a better option. This is probably the only recorded incident of a train having sunk a ship.

=== Loading and unloading ===
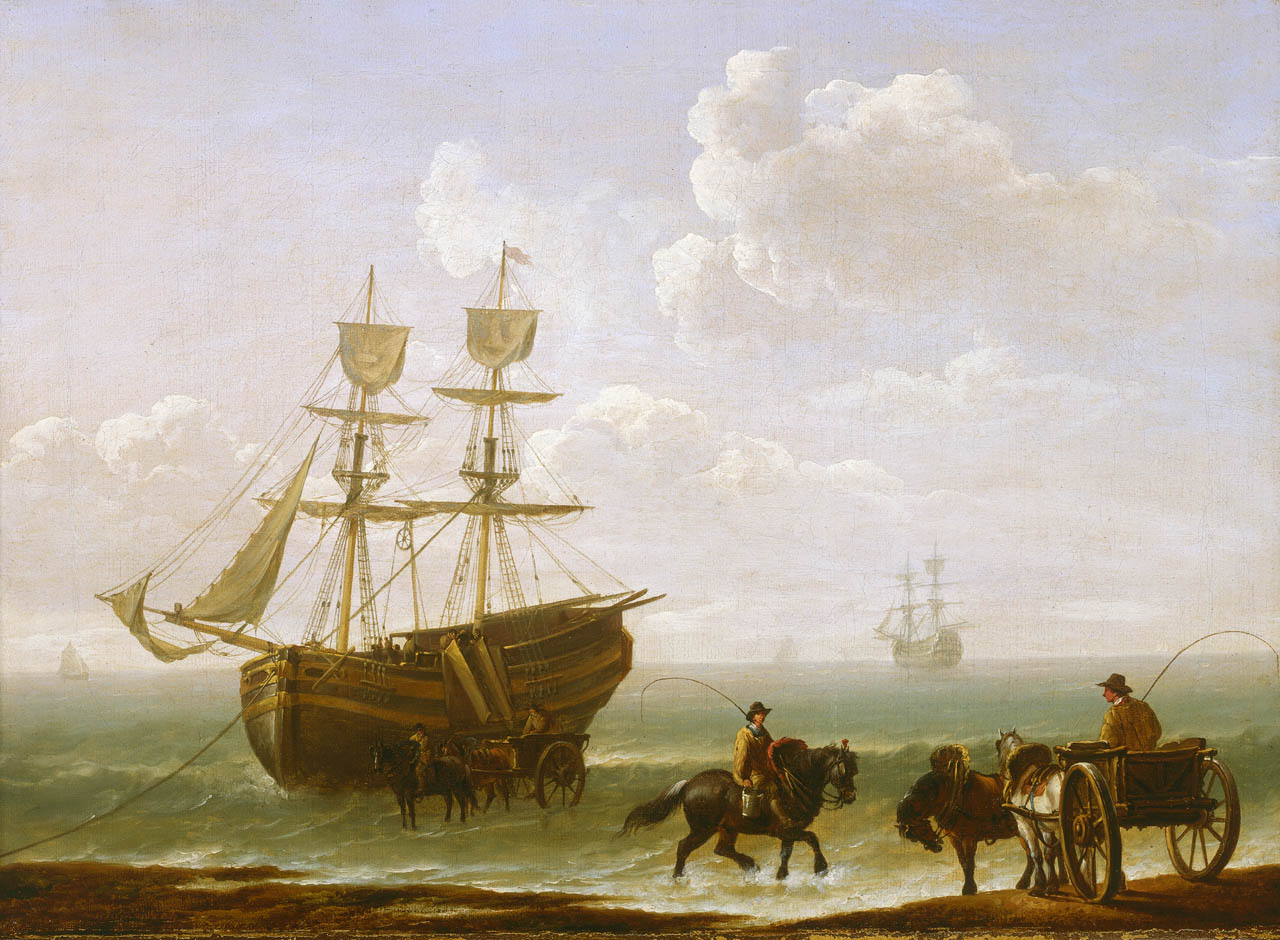
A collier has been deliberately beached so that the cargo of coal can be unloaded into carts and taken for sale.

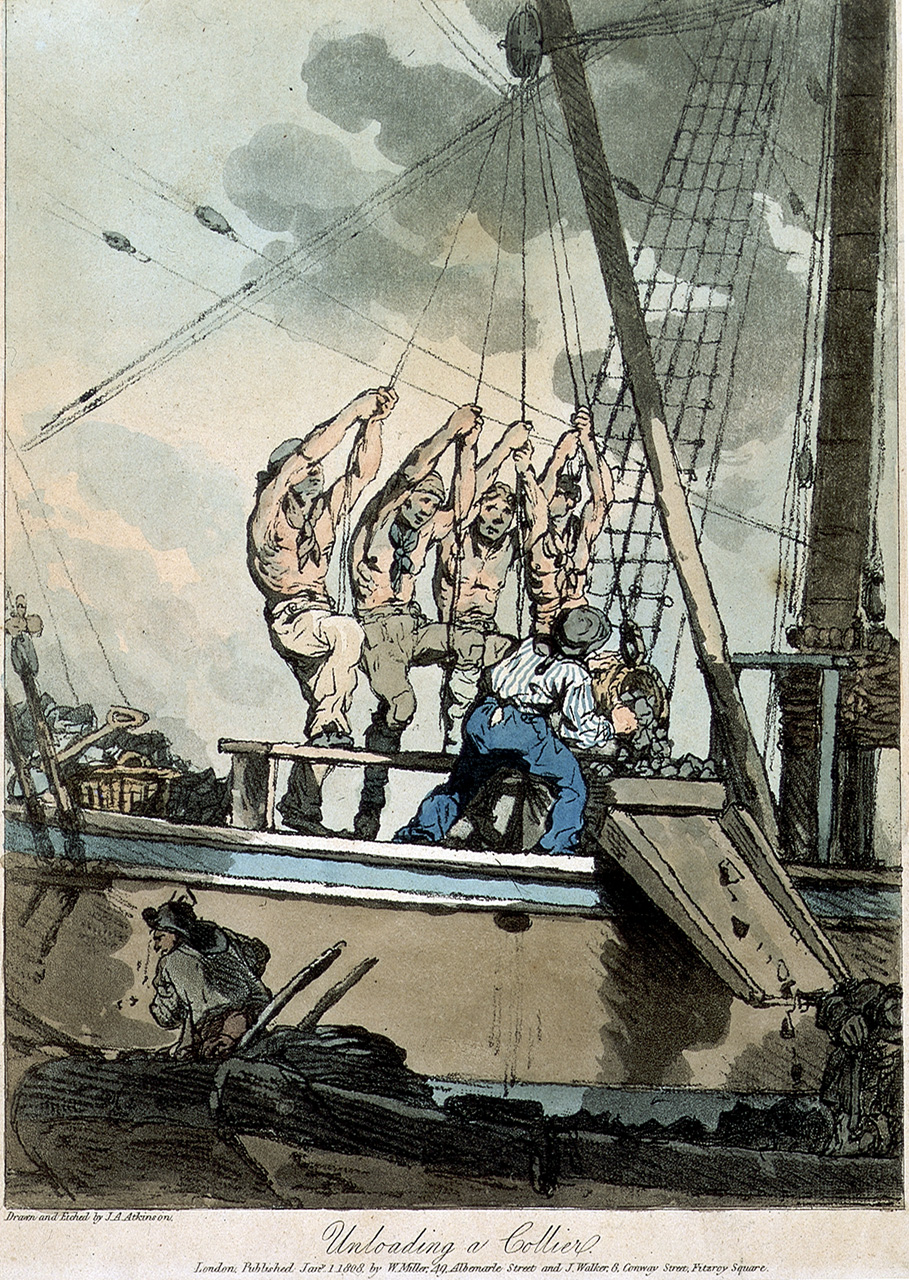
Coal whippers unloading a collier. Four men climb up a step set on the collier's deck, holding ropes that go to a pulley fastened above and then down to a basket in the hold. They jump off the step, holding the rope, and their weight lifts the basket out of the hold. It is then tipped into a chute that leads into the barge alongside.

Loading the colliers was carried out by hand at first, especially where coal was transferred from keels which had brought it downstream from parts of the river that the colliers were unable to navigate. As demand increased, specialised jetties known as "staithes" began to be built in the 1890s. These were of numerous designs. Some had spouts used for unscreened or small coal, others known as "drops" had steep inclines at the end, down which a wagon would be lowered directly into the hold, minimising the breakage of coal. Some had both drops and spouts. The drops and spouts could be raised and lowered with the tide. Later, elevators began to be introduced, such as those at Bates Staithes in Blyth, Northumberland and Harton Low Staithes in South Shields. These staithes used spouts. The largely intact Dunston Staiths on the Tyne are a good example of this type. In Scotland, a system was common where wagons would be placed on a cradle and lifted into the hold of the ship, but this system was rarely used elsewhere. Two large steam cranes were built for this purpose at the Harton Low Staithes, but it was found that despite their size and power they were too slow to handle the amount of coal that was arriving at the staithes, and were replaced by elevators.

The men who worked at the staithes were known as teemers and trimmers. Teemers would open the doors on the bottom of the wagons to allow the coal to fall into hoppers under the rail deck on top of the staithes, or in the case of drops, directly into the hold of the collier. The trimmers worked in the hold, spreading and levelling the coal with shovels and rakes so that its weight would be evenly distributed. Skilled trimmers could stand with their shovel under the stream of coal coming from a spout or the end of a conveyor and angle it so the coal would ricochet off into the part of the hold they wanted to fill. This was a dangerous job, as the holds could fill with firedamp given off by the coal, resulting in an explosion. More modern systems are designed to be able to evenly distribute the coal without the need for men working in the holds of the ships.

Although, in later years, the colliers faced competition from the railways in supplying coal for domestic use in the capital, large quantities of coal were used at the numerous power stations on the banks of the River Thames, and wharves were constructed alongside them for unloading the colliers. These vessels known as "flat-irons" with a low-profile superstructures and fold-down funnels and masts to fit under bridges over the Thames above the Pool of London. The wharf at Battersea Power Station is still extant, and the cranes formerly used for unloading the coal could be seen on the riverfront until their removal in 2014; due to the historic nature of the site they were intended to be returned but have instead been stored at Tilbury Docks. These are fitted with clamshell buckets and in operation loaded a hopper, which in turn fed a conveyor system leading to the power station's coal bunkers. The modern equivalent can be seen at the Tyne Coal Terminal, unloading bulk carriers. Gas Light and Coke Company had similar facilities at its large gasworks, also alongside the Thames, for handling the large quantity of bituminous coal which was needed to supply the capital with town gas.

== Alternate uses ==
In the late eighteenth century, a number of wooden-hulled sailing colliers gained fame after being adapted for use in voyages of exploration in the South Pacific, for which their flat-bottomed hulls and sturdy construction made them well-suited.

USS Langley, the first aircraft carrier in the United States Navy, was a converted collier (originally USS Jupiter). It was fitted with a large elevated flat deck, used before the development of purpose-built aircraft carrier hulls.

== See also ==
=== Vessels of similar function ===
- Coal hulks, coal-carrying vessels, often unpowered, that are restricted to harbor duties
- Flatirons, coastal trading vessels designed to pass under low bridges, many of which served as colliers
- Replenishment oiler, designed for replenishing oil/diesel-fueled ships
- Tanker (aircraft), used for in-flight aircraft refueling

=== Famous colliers ===
==== Vessels of James Cook ====
- HM Bark Endeavour, the former collier, Earl of Pembroke, purchased for James Cook's first voyage of discovery
- HMS Adventure, the first ship to circumnavigate the globe from west to east
- HMS Resolution, used in his second and third voyages of exploration
- HMS Discovery

==== Other famous colliers ====
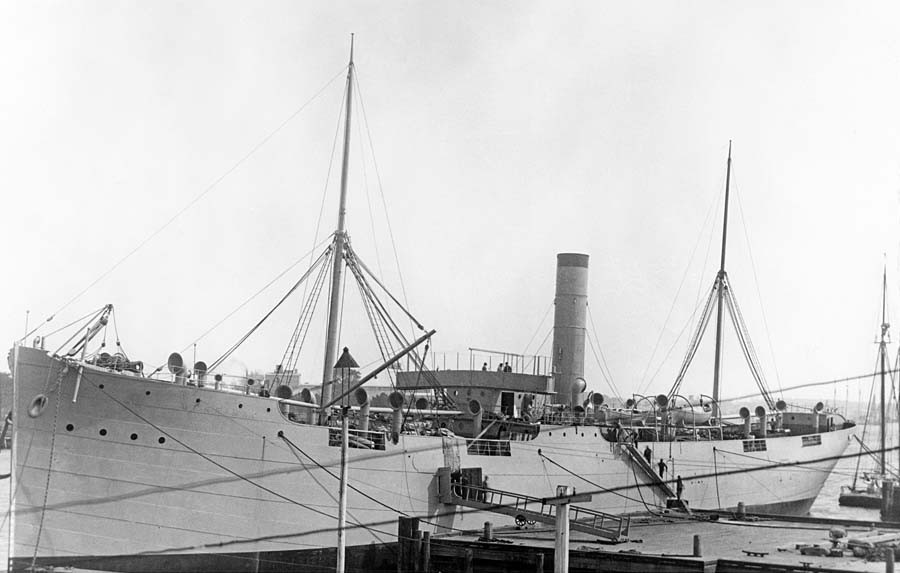
The collier USS Merrimac

- HMY Royal Escape, the collier Surprise on which the future Charles II had escaped to France in 1651; bought as a Royal yacht after the Restoration.
- HMS Bounty, a refitted collier famous for the mutiny among its crew.
- HMS Investigator, credited as the first ship to circumnavigate Australia.
- USS Merrimac, the only American ship sunk by the Spanish Navy in the Spanish–American War, in an action in which all 8 crewmen were subsequently awarded the Medal of Honor.
- SS River Clyde, refitted into a landing ship for the Gallipoli landings.
- USS Cyclops, lost at sea, connected by some theories to the Bermuda Triangle
- USS Jupiter, sister to the Cyclops, converted into the United States' first aircraft carrier Langley.
- MV Kerlogue, an Irish collier that survived both Allied and Axis attacks during World War II.
- SS Storstad, a Norwegian collier that collided with and sank RMS Empress of Ireland in the Saint Lawrence River, killing 1,012 in Canada's worst peacetime maritime disaster.
- USS Vestal, converted to a repair ship and served in both World Wars, receiving two battle stars in World War II.
- SS Wandle, a flatiron collier that survived several attacks in World War II.
- Wyoming, a 6-masted schooner and the largest wooden ship ever built.

=== Other ===
- List of auxiliaries of the United States Navy § Colliers (AC)
- 'Sixty-milers', colliers of the coastal coal-carrying trade of New South Wales
