= List of statutory instruments of the United Kingdom, 1949 =

This is an incomplete list of statutory instruments of the United Kingdom in 1949.

== Statutory instruments ==
=== 1-499 ===
- Coffin Furniture and Cerement-Making Wages Council (Great Britain) (Constitution) Order 1949 (SI 1949/3)
- Cooked Beetroot (Revocation) Order 1949 (SI 1949/5)
- Citizenship Law (New Zealand) Order 1949 (SI 1949/7)
- Act of Sederunt (Sheriff Court Fees) 1949 (SI 1949/9)
- Army and Air Force (Women's Service) (Adaptation of Enactments) Order 1949 (SI 1949/61)
- Fire Services (Pensionable Employment) Regulations 1949 (SI 1949/71)
- Criminal Justice Act 1948 (Date of Commencement) Order 1949 (SI 1949/139)
- Companies (Winding-up) Rules 1949 (SI 1949/330)
- Double Taxation Relief (Taxes on Income) (Grenada) Order 1949 (SI 1949/361)
- Criminal Justice Act 1948 (Date of Commencement) (No. 2) Order 1949 (SI 1949/372)
- Local Government (Compensation) (Amendment) Regulations 1949 (SI 1949/489)
- National Assistance (Compensation) (Amendment) Regulations 1949 (SI 1949/490)

=== 500-999 ===
- Superannuation (Local Government Staffs) (National Service) Rules 1949 (SI 1949/545)
- Hill Farming Improvements Order 1949 (SI 1949/548)
- Pension Schemes (Employees in Northern Ireland) Regulations 1949 (SI 1949/584)
- Railway and Canal Commission (Abolition) Act (Commencement) Order 1949 (SI 1949/603)
- Trading with the Enemy (Authorisation) (Germany) Order 1949 (SI 1949/605)
- Trading with the Enemy (Transfer of Negotiable Instruments, etc.) (Germany) Order 1949 (SI 1949/606)
- Superannuation (Local Act Authorities Schemes) Interchange Rules 1949 (SI 1949/630)
- Local Government Superannuation (England and Scotland) (Amendment) Regulations 1949 (SI 1949/631)
- Gas (Allocation of Undertakings to Area Boards and Gas Council) Order 1949 (SI 1949/742)
- Packing of Explosive for Conveyance Rules 1949 (SI 1949/798)
- Coal Industry (Superannuation Scheme) (Winding Up, No. 1) Regulations 1949 (SI 1949/917)

=== 1000-1499 ===
- Criminal Justice Act 1948 (Date of Commencement) (No. 3) Order 1949 (SI 1949/1045)
- Superannuation Schemes (War Service) (End of Emergency) Order 1949 (SI 1949/1053)
- Trading with the Enemy (Custodian) Order 1949 (SI 1949/1083)
- Stopping Up of Highways (Norfolk) (No. 1) Order 1949 (SI 1949/1198)
- Runcorn District Water Board Order 1949 (SI 1949/1317)
- Superannuation (Approved Employment) Rules 1949 (SI 1949/1327)
- Sleaford Water Order 1949 (SI 1949/1331)
- National Insurance (Pensions, Existing Contributors) (Transitional) Amendment (No. 2) Regulations 1949 (SI 1949/1412)
- Superannuation (Local Government, Social Workers and Health Education Staff) Interchange Rules 1949 (SI 1949/1465)

=== 1500-1999 ===
- Birmingham—Great Yarmouth Trunk Road (High House and Other Diversions) Order 1949 (SI 1949/1544)
- Superannuation (Reckoning of Certain Previous Service) Rules 1949 (SI 1949/1803)
- Agricultural Wages Board Regulations 1949 (SI 1949/1884)
- Agricultural Wages Committees Regulations 1949 (SI 1949/1885)
- Federated Superannuation System for Universities (Temporary Service) Regulations 1949 (SI 1949/1890)
- Federated Superannuation System for Universities (War Service) Regulations 1949 (SI 1949/1891)

=== 2000-2499 ===
- Isles of Scilly (Importation of Animals Regulations) Order 1949 (SI 1949/2012)
- Agricultural Marketing (Public Inquiry) Rules 1949 (SI 1949/2094)
- Superannuation (Governors of Dominions, etc.) Rules 1949 (SI 1949/2114)
- Federated Superannuation System for Universities (Temporary Service) (Amendment) Regulations 1949 (SI 1949/2116)
- Hill Farming Improvements (Piers, etc.) Order 1949 (SI 1949/2169)
- Fire Services (Pensionable Employment) (No. 2) Regulations 1949 (SI 1949/2216)
- Dry Cleaning Special Regulations 1949 (SI 1949/2224)
- Blasting (Castings and Other Articles) Special Regulations 1949 (SI 1949/2225)
- Copy-right (Industrial Design) Rules 1949 (SI 1949/2367)
- Designs Rules 1949 (SI 1949/2368)
- Statutory Orders (Special Procedure) (Substitution) Order 1949 (SI 1949/2393)

== See also ==
- List of statutory instruments of the United Kingdom
