= List of schools in Bolton =

This is a list of schools in the Metropolitan Borough of Bolton in the English county of Greater Manchester.

== State-funded schools ==
=== Primary schools ===
- All Saints' CE Primary School, Farnworth
- Beacon Primary School, Horwich
- Beaumont Primary School, Deane
- Bishop Bridgeman CE Primary School, Bolton
- Blackrod CE/Methodist Primary School, Blackrod
- Blackrod Primary School, Blackrod
- Blackshaw Primary School, Breightmet
- Bolton Parish Church CE Primary School, Bolton
- Bolton St Catherine's Academy, Breightmet
- Bowness Primary School, Little Lever
- Brandwood Primary School, Bolton
- Brownlow Fold Primary School, Halliwell
- Castle Hill Primary School, Tonge Moor
- Cherry Tree Primary School, Farnworth
- Chorley New Road Primary Academy, Horwich
- Church Road Primary School, Halliwell
- Clarendon Primary School, Bolton
- Claypool Primary School, Horwich
- Devonshire Road Primary School, Bolton
- Eagley Infant School, Eagley
- Eagley Junior School, Eagley
- Eatock Primary School, Westhoughton
- Egerton Primary School, Egerton
- Essa Primary School, Great Lever
- The Ferns Primary Academy, Farnworth
- Gaskell Community Primary School, Bolton
- The Gates Primary School, Westhoughton
- Gilnow Primary School, Bolton
- Hardy Mill Primary School, Harwood
- Harwood Meadows Primary School, Harwood
- Haslam Park Primary School, Bolton
- Heathfield Primary School, Daubhill
- High Lawn Primary School, Sharples
- Highfield Primary School, Farnworth
- Holy Infant and St Anthony RC Primary School, Astley Bridge
- Horwich Parish CE Primary School, Horwich
- Johnson Fold Community Primary School, Halliwell
- Kearsley West Primary School, Kearsley
- Ladybridge Community Primary School, Deane
- Lever Edge Primary School, Great Lever
- Leverhulme Community Primary School, Breightmet
- Lostock Primary School, Lostock
- Markland Hill Primary School, Markland Hill
- Masefield Primary School, Little Lever
- Moorgate Primary School, Bolton
- Mytham Primary School, Little Lever
- The Oaks Primary School, Sharples
- The Olive School, Bolton
- The Olive Tree Primary School, Daubhill
- Our Lady of Lourdes RC Primary School, Farnworth
- Oxford Grove Primary School, Halliwell
- Pikes Lane Primary School, Bolton
- Prestolee Primary School, Prestolee
- Queensbridge Primary School, Farnworth
- Red Lane Primary School, Breightmet
- Sacred Heart RC Primary School, Westhoughton
- St Andrew's CE Primary School, Over Hulton
- St Bartholomew's CE Primary School, Westhoughton
- St Bede Academy, Bolton
- St Bernard's RC Primary School, Deane
- St Brendan's RC Primary School, Harwood
- St Catherine's CE Primary School, Horwich
- St Columba's RC Primary School, Tonge Moor
- St Ethelbert's RC Primary School, Deane
- St George's CE Primary School, Westhoughton
- St Gregory's RC Primary School, Farnworth
- St James' CE Primary School, Farnworth
- St James' CE Primary School, Westhoughton
- St John the Evangelist's RC Primary School, Bromley Cross
- St John's CE Primary School, Kearsley
- St Joseph's RC Primary School, Halliwell
- St Mary's CE Primary School, Deane
- St Mary's RC Primary School, Horwich
- St Matthew's CE Primary School, Halliwell
- St Matthew's CE Primary School, Little Lever
- St Maxentius CE Primary School, Bradshaw
- St Michael's CE Primary School, Great Lever
- St Paul's CE Primary School, Astley Bridge
- St Peter and St Paul RC Primary School, Bolton
- St Peter's CE Primary School, Farnworth
- St Peter's Smithills Dean CE Primary School, Smithills
- St Saviour CE Primary School, Ringley
- St Stephen and All Martyrs CE Primary School, Darcy Lever
- St Stephen's CE Primary School, Kearsley
- St Teresa's RC Primary School, Little Lever
- St Thomas of Canterbury RC Primary School, Heaton
- St Thomas' CE Primary School, Halliwell
- St Thomas' CE Primary School, Westhoughton
- St William of York RC Primary School, Great Lever
- SS Osmund and Andrew's RC Primary School, Breightmet
- SS Simon and Jude CE Primary School, Great Lever
- Sharples Primary School, Sharples
- Spindle Point Primary School, Kearsley
- Sunning Hill Primary School, Daubhill
- Tonge Moor Primary Academy, Tonge Moor
- The Valley Community Primary School, Bolton
- Walmsley CE Primary School, Egerton
- Washacre Primary School, Westhoughton

=== Secondary schools ===
- Bolton Muslim Girls' School, Bolton
- Bolton St Catherine's Academy, Breightmet
- Canon Slade School, Bradshaw
- Eden Boys' School, Bolton
- Essa Academy, Great Lever
- Harper Green School, Farnworth
- Kearsley Academy, Kearsley
- King's Leadership Academy Bolton, Great Lever
- Ladybridge High School, Deane
- Little Lever School, Little Lever
- Mount St Joseph School, Farnworth
- Rivington and Blackrod High School, Horwich
- St James's Church of England High School, Farnworth
- St Joseph's RC High School, Horwich
- Sharples School, Sharples
- Smithills School, Smithills
- Thornleigh Salesian College, Astley Bridge
- Turton School, Bromley Cross
- University Collegiate School, Bolton
- Westhoughton High School, Westhoughton

=== Special and alternative schools ===
- Firwood High School, Bolton
- Forwards Centre, Breightmet
- Green Fold School, Farnworth
- Ladywood School, Little Lever
- Lever Park School, Horwich
- Park School Teaching Service, Breightmet
- Rumworth School, Deane
- Thomasson Memorial School, Bolton
- Youth Challenge PRU, Bolton

=== Further education ===
- Bolton College
- Bolton Sixth Form College

== Independent schools ==
=== Primary and preparatory schools ===
- Al-Huda Primary School, Bolton
- Clevelands Prep School, Bolton

=== Senior and all-through schools ===
- Bolton Islamic Girls School, Bolton
- Bolton School, Bolton
- Darul Uloom Bolton, Deane
- Lord's School, Bolton
- Madrasatul Imam Muhammad Zakariya, Bolton

=== Special and alternative schools ===
- Birtenshaw, Bromley Cross
- Raise Education and Wellbeing School, Great Lever
- TLG Bolton, Farnworth
