= Turton Local History Society =

English local history society

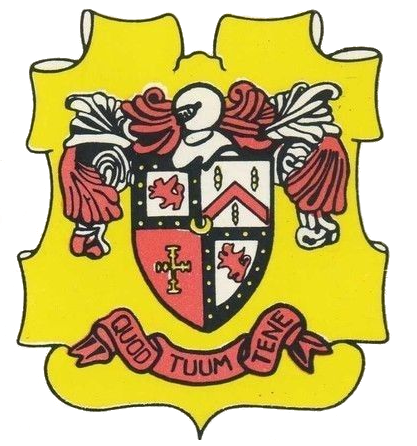
- Founded: 1974
- Location: Turton, Lancashire, United Kingdom
- Method: Research, publication, education, library, archives, speakers, events
- Website: http://www.turtonhistory.com/

Turton Local History Society (TLHS) is an English local history society covering the area of Turton in the North West of England. The district includes the ancient townships of Bradshaw, Edgworth, Entwistle, Harwood, Longworth, Quarlton and Turton, and includes the areas now known as Egerton, Bromley Cross and Chapeltown.

TLHS was established in 1974 with the aim of promoting an interest in history in general and of the history of Turton, in particular by discussion, research and record. The society studies various aspects of history relating to local topography, geography, land ownership, administration, industry, communities, organisations, people and buildings.

== History ==
The society had its roots in the WEA local history class started in 1972 at the Barlow Institute, Edgworth with the late Marie Mitchell, a much respected local historian and archaeologist, as tutor. Such was the enthusiasm and interest engendered by Marie that, when the classes were transferred to Bolton following the boundary changes in 1974, the majority of the members decided to continue independently.

Under the initial Chairmanship of Brian Crossley, monthly meetings were arranged at the Barlow Institute in the winter months featuring talks on local, regional and national subjects, and also guided walkabouts in the summer months.

Members of TLHS were involved in recording local date-stones and church memorials, and in recovering and renovating the last water wheel in Turton. They have also carried out research using deeds, maps and documents, often in private possession, that enabled the publication of booklets on various local topics since 1975.

The logo featured on the cover of each of the publications was the same one used by Turton Urban District Council, which by the time of the first publication had ceased to exist. This was originally the coat of arms of the Chetham family, one time Lords of the Manor of Turton.

== Publications ==
- Lindlop, R. (1975). Stories of Turton Date Stones. TLHS. ISBN 978-1-904974-01-7.
- Francis, J. J. (1977). Lords of the Manor of Bradshaw. TLHS. ISBN 978-1-904974-02-4.
- Lindlop, R. (1978). Turton Tales I. TLHS. ISBN 978-1-904974-03-1.
- Francis, J. J. (1979). Bradshaw Works. TLHS. ISBN 978-1-904974-04-8.
- Francis, J. J. (1982). Bradshaw & Harwood Collieries. TLHS. ISBN 978-1-904974-05-5.
- Martin, S. H. (1984). The Bradshaw Flood Reprint. TLHS. ISBN 978-1-904974-97-0.
- Francis, J. J. (1986). Enclosure of Edgworth Moor. TLHS. ISBN 978-1-904974-07-9.
- Openshaw, G. (1987). Turton Tales II. TLHS. ISBN 978-1-904974-08-6.
- Francis, J. J. (1987). Harwood Friendly Societies. TLHS. ISBN 978-1-904974-09-3.
- Francis, J. J. (1988). The Bradshaw Chapel History Trail. TLHS. ISBN 978-1-904974-10-9.
- Lindlop, R. (1989). The History of Turton Mill. TLHS. ISBN 978-1-904974-11-6.
- Day, A. S. (1989). Datestones of Bradshaw & Harwood. TLHS. ISBN 978-1-904974-12-3.
- Francis, J. J. (1990). The Enclosure of Harwood Commons. TLHS. ISBN 978-1-904974-13-0.
- Francis, J. J. (1992). Horrobin Mill. TLHS. ISBN 978-1-904974-14-7.
- Francis, J. J. (1994). Affetside. TLHS. ISBN 978-1-904974-15-4.
- Heyes, H. (1997). Eagley Brook: A Lancashire Stream. TLHS. ISBN 978-1-904974-16-1.
- Horridge, J. F. (1997). Harwood Vale: 1865-1965. TLHS. ISBN 978-1-904974-17-8.
- Francis, J. J. (1998). Bradshaw Chapel I. TLHS. ISBN 978-1-904974-18-5.
- Francis, J. J. (1998). Bradshaw Chapel II. TLHS. ISBN 978-1-904974-19-2.
- Horridge, J. F. (1999). 2000 - Turton through the Ages. TLHS. ISBN 978-1-904974-20-8.
- Francis, J. J. (2000). Quarlton. TLHS. ISBN 978-1-904974-98-7.
- Horridge, J. F. (2001). Hardy Cornmill. TLHS. ISBN 978-1-904974-22-2.
- Horridge, J. F. (2003). People and Places of Turton. TLHS. ISBN 978-1-904974-23-9.
- Harris, P. M. (2003). Lost Industries of Turton Moor. TLHS. ISBN 978-1-904974-00-0.
- Francis, J. J. (2004). Harwood Hill Farms & Riding Gate. TLHS. ISBN 978-1-904974-25-3.
- Francis, J. (2005). Samuel Scowcroft's Diary. TLHS. ISBN 978-1-904974-26-0.
- Horridge, J. F. (2006). Harwood - The Early Years. TLHS. ISBN 978-1-904974-27-7.
- Francis, J. J. (2006). Birches. TLHS. ISBN 978-1-904974-28-4.
- Bagley, A. (2007). Turton Fair. TLHS. ISBN 978-1-904974-29-1.
- Francis, J. J. (2007). Highways of Turton. TLHS. ISBN 978-1-904974-30-7.
- Leeming, D. J. (2008). Churches and Chapels of Turton. TLHS. ISBN 978-1-904974-31-4.
- Francis, J. J. (2009). The Barlow Institute. TLHS. ISBN 978-1-904974-32-1.
- Walsh, C. R. (2011). Entwistle. TLHS. ISBN 978-1-904974-33-8.
- Leeming, D. J. (2011). Turton Workhouse. TLHS. ISBN 978-1-904974-34-5.
- Francis, J. J. (2012). The Bradshaw Estate 1542 - 1919. TLHS. ISBN 978-1-904974-35-2.
- Harris, P. M. (2013). Mining in Turton. TLHS. ISBN 978-1-904974-36-9.
- Barlow, J. (2018). Pubs in Turton 1. TLHS. ISBN 978-1-904974-37-6.
- Tonge, S. J. (2019). Egerton. TLHS. ISBN 978-1-904974-38-3.
- Horrocks, R.; Flentje, B. (2025). Holcombe Rifle Ranges. TLHS. ISBN 978-1-904974-39-0.
- Melia, G. (2025). Turton Timeline. TLHS. ISBN 978-1-904974-40-6.
