= Lea Gate Farmhouse =

Listed building in Bradshaw, Greater Manchester, England

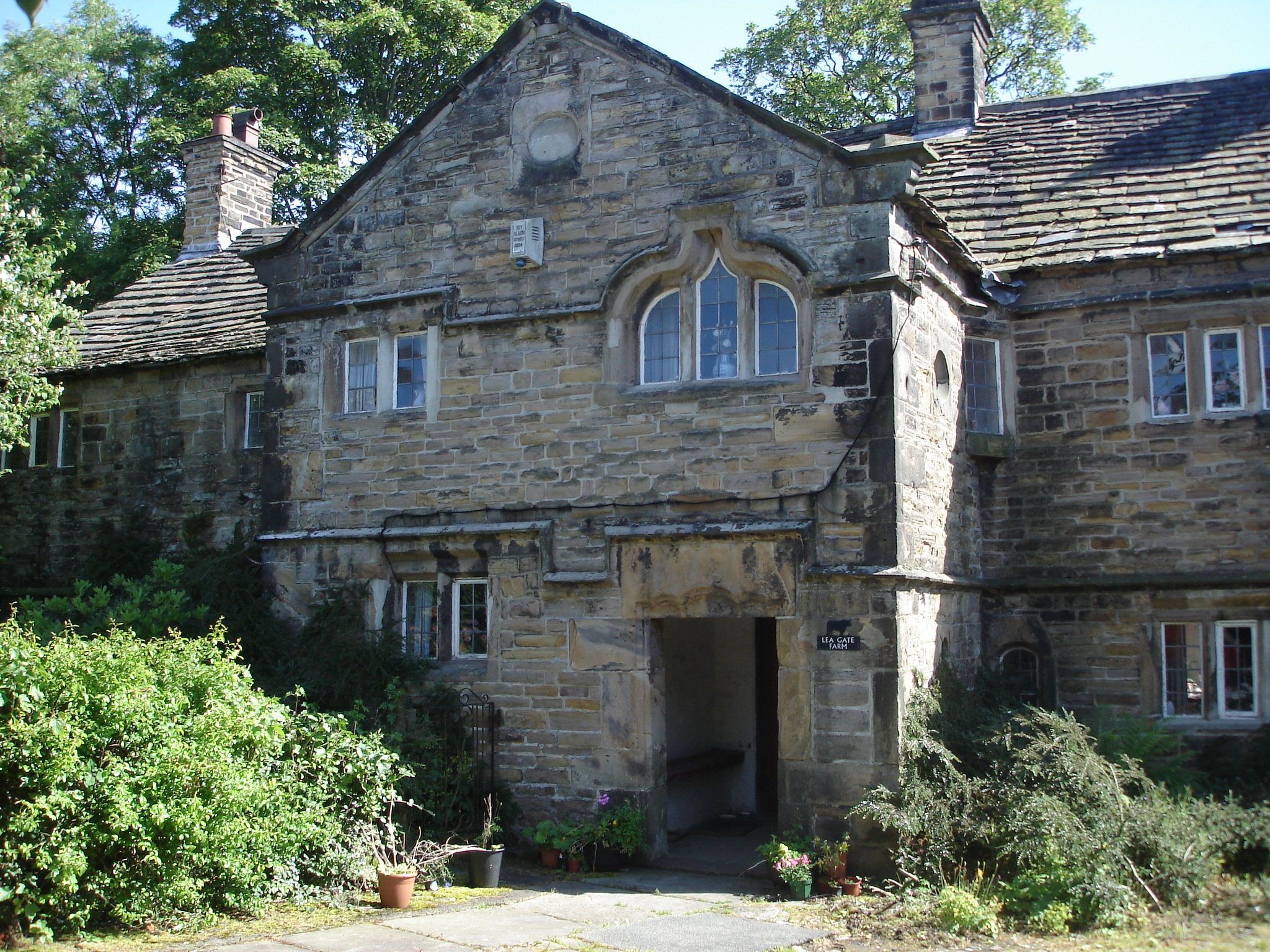
- Lea Gate Farmhouse in 2014

- Location within Greater Manchester

General information
- Location: Lea Gate, Bradshaw, Greater Manchester, England
- Coordinates: 53.6050°N 2.3971°W
- Year built: c. 1700; 326 years ago

Listed Building – Grade II*
- Official name: Lea Gate Farmhouse
- Designated: 27 January 1967
- Reference no.: 1162725

Listed Building – Grade II
- Official name: Barn to north west of Lea Gate Farmhouse
- Designated: 27 January 1967
- Reference no.: 1356804

Lea Gate Farmhouse is a historic building on Lea Gate in Bradshaw, a village in South Turton within the Metropolitan Borough of Bolton, Greater Manchester, England. Dating from around 1700, it originally formed a single dwelling and later became part of a working farmstead that operated into the early 21st century. Once one of several farms in the Harwood and Bradshaw area, it retained its historic buildings even as surrounding land was sold for housing in the 1960s. The farmhouse was Grade II* listed in 1967, and the property now comprises two dwellings and the former dairy.

== History ==
The farmhouse dates from around 1700 and originally served as a single dwelling before later being divided into multiple residences. It formed part of a working farmstead that remained active until the early 21st century. Historically, Lea Gate was one of ten farms in the Harwood and Bradshaw area, reflecting the region's agricultural heritage, and stood within its own grazing land.

During the 1960s, much of the surrounding farmland was sold for residential development, but the farm buildings at Lea Gate were retained, and farming continued on the site until 2005.

On 27 January 1967, Lea Gate Farmhouse was designated a Grade II* listed building. A nearby barn, dated to 1729 and later extended, associated with the farmstead, is separately listed at Grade II. Today, the property comprises two dwellings along with the former dairy.

== Architecture ==
The building is constructed from dressed stone with prominent quoins and is roofed in stone slates. The structure has two storeys and is arranged in five bays, with the third and fourth bays projecting beneath gables. A continuous drip mould runs across the ground floor and along the upper bays from the third to the fifth. The gables are coped and finished with kneelers.

The ground floor features double-chamfered mullioned windows in a varied arrangement, with lights grouped in pairs and threes, interspersed with single openings, and a round-headed light positioned to the right of the fourth bay. The first floor has similar mullioned windows, including one with an ogee head in the fourth bay. The entrance is set within a recessed porch in the fourth bay, which includes a decorated lintel and a circular opening on the return. The roofline is marked by a cross-axial chimney stack and a gable-end stack. At the rear, later extensions are present along with some surviving mullioned windows.

=== Interior ===
Internally, the farmhouse retains several original features including chamfered ceiling beams and a cambered bressummer above the fireplace. Another feature is the dog-leg staircase, which incorporates turned balusters and square newels.

== See also ==
- Grade II* listed buildings in Greater Manchester
- Listed buildings in South Turton
