= 3 and 4 Walsh Fold =

Listed building in Bolton, Greater Manchester, England

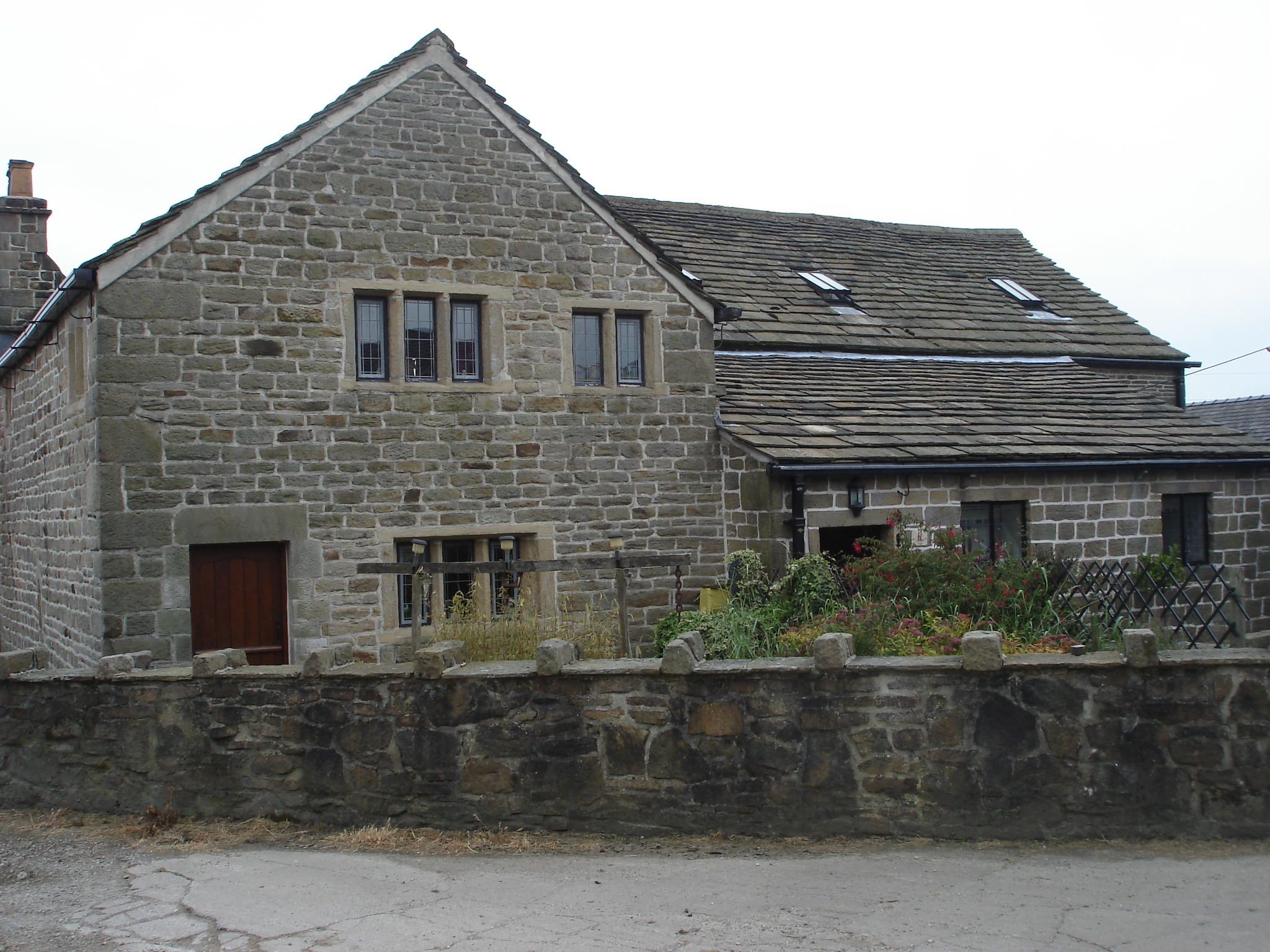
- The building in 2014

- Location within Greater Manchester

General information
- Location: Bradshaw, Greater Manchester, England
- Coordinates: 53.6273°N 2.3954°W
- Year built: Late 17th century

Listed Building – Grade II*
- Official name: 3 and 4 Walsh Fold
- Designated: 27 January 1967
- Reference no.: 1067308

3 and 4 Walsh Fold are a pair of historic dwellings in Bradshaw, a village in South Turton within the Metropolitan Borough of Bolton, Greater Manchester, England. Originally built as a single farmhouse in the late 17th century, the property was later divided into two houses and is now designated a Grade II* listed building.

== History ==
The farmhouse dates from the late 1600s, reflecting the rural character of Bradshaw during this period. Datestones recorded on the site include 1619, 1658, and 1831, indicating phases of construction and alteration over two centuries.

Originally constructed as a single farmhouse, the building has since been adapted for modern residential use and is now divided into two separate dwellings, known as Nos. 3 and 4 Walsh Fold. On 27 January 1967, it was designated a Grade II* listed building.

Today, both residences remain privately owned and form part of a small cluster of historic properties within the hamlet of Walsh Fold.

== Architecture ==
The building is constructed of dressed stone with prominent quoins and is topped by a stone slate roof with brick chimney stacks. It is arranged over two storeys with a symmetrical four-bay frontage, the outer bay incorporating a gable. The windows are double-chamfered mullioned types; those on the ground floor and within the gabled bay are fitted with label mouldings. The ground floor contains a series of multi-light windows, some of which have lost mullions, while the upper floor features a varied arrangement of mullioned openings, including one blocked round-headed window.

The main entrance is positioned between the first and second bays and is sheltered by a glazed porch added in the 20th century, with a further doorway in the gabled bay. A substantial cross-axial chimney stack rises from the roof, and the right-hand return wall contains a blocked round-headed opening and paired mullioned windows, flanked by two brick lateral stacks. At the rear, a later outshut extends beneath a swept cat-slide roof, partly obscuring earlier fenestration, and incorporates a mullioned window and a secondary entrance.

=== Interior ===
Internally, the building retains chamfered beams and a bressummer over the former fireplace, timber-framed partitions, and a roof structure formed of collar trusses.

== See also ==
- Grade II* listed buildings in Greater Manchester
- Listed buildings in South Turton
