= Affetside =

Village in Greater Manchester, England

Coordinates: 53.618°N 2.368°W

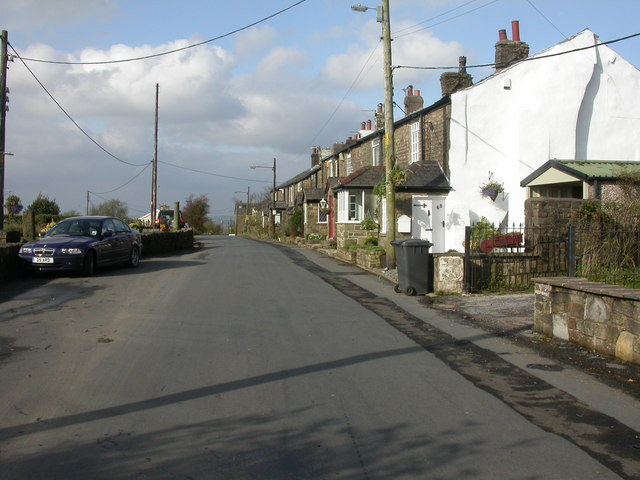
- Terraced cottages at Affetside

- Location within Greater Manchester
- Population: 150
- OS grid reference: SD755136
- Metropolitan borough: Bury
- Metropolitan county: Greater Manchester
- Region: North West
- Country: England
- Sovereign state: United Kingdom
- Post town: BURY
- Postcode district: BL8
- Dialling code: 01204
- Police: Greater Manchester
- Fire: Greater Manchester
- Ambulance: North West
- UK Parliament: Bury North

Affetside is a village in Greater Manchester, England. Historically in Lancashire, it is in the Tottington ward of Bury Metropolitan Borough Council and the Bury North parliamentary constituency, in the West Pennine Moors.

== History ==
=== Toponymy ===
Affetside is derived from the Old English ofer ("border or boundary") and side ("hillside"), meaning the boundary on the hill, which is appropriate as its highest point is 900 ft (270 m) above sea level. The boundary follows the route of the Roman road known as Watling Street that ran from Manchester (Mamucium) to Ribchester (Bremetennacum) built in about 72AD. Affetside has been recorded with various spellings since the 16th century: Avesyde, Haffetside, Affaitsyde, Offyside, Affetsid. The present spelling was first recorded in 1504.

=== History ===
The village is on the Roman road between Manchester and Ribchester. The main street was called Watling Street. Development of the village accelerated in the 1700s when it provided grazing, blacksmiths and inns to travellers using the packhorse route. The Pack Horse Inn was built in 1443.

A day school opened in Affetside Chapel in 1879. As the building was shared, the congregation put out desks on Monday mornings and removed them on Friday in preparation for the Sunday service and did so until the school closed in August 2003.

The village lost 15 church and school members in the First World War. The chapel congregation raised funds for a memorial and purchased a new organ which was unveiled in 1920 and is still in use.

In 1955 Tottington Urban District Council suggested demolishing sub-standard cottages in the village and rehousing the occupants in Tottington. The suggestion was overwhelmingly unpopular. A battle for piped water caused residents to form an action group and piped water was supplied to the village from 1976.

Local historian James Francis, and author of Affetside, an historical survey, believes the village's strength shows through its survival. He says:

"The building of the local turnpike road was the death knell for the packhorse trains, but the Affetsiders showed great resilience in continuing to build up their village, and so the village did not collapse like others, less fortunate. For such a small village, with only about 150 people to still have a church and pub says a lot about the people who live there."

== Governance ==
For many years the road through the village was the boundary between the townships of Bradshaw and Tottington. After local government reform in 1894 the road marked the meeting point of Turton and Tottington urban districts and after reorganisation in 1974, the boundary marked the meeting of Bolton and Bury Metropolitan Boroughs. In 1991 the anomaly was removed by extending the boundary of the Metropolitan Borough of Bury to the west of Watling Street.

== Geography ==
The village lies north west of Tottington, west of Greenmount and Hawkshaw and south of Edgworth.

== Economy ==
The villagers travel to nearby towns for work. In 1921 the first (and last) Holcombe Hunt point to point steeplechase was run. An estimated 100,000 visitors arrived to watch. Families turned their houses into shops providing refreshments and farmers sold milk. The steeplechase course over jumps and two brooks was a success but subsequently the event was held at Nab Fold in Harwood.

== Landmarks ==
=== Affetside Cross ===
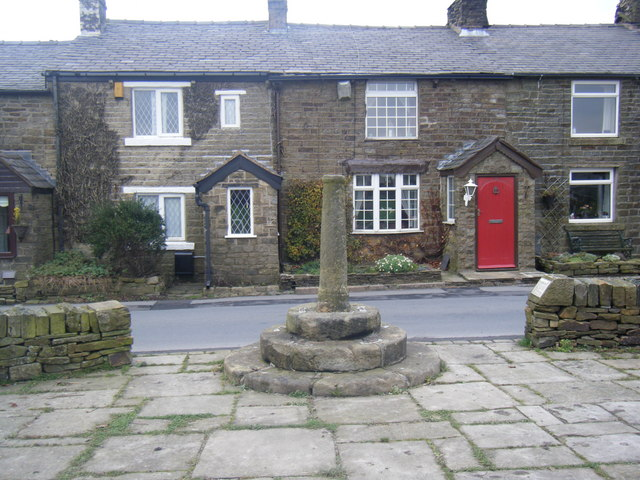
Affetside Cross

The cross is a grade II listed structure. Its shaft is made from a single piece of gritstone on a plinth consisting of two stone steps, one circular, 7.5 ft (2.3 m) in diameter, and 4 inches (0.10 m) high and a smaller one 5 ft 3 in (1.60 m) in diameter and 10 inches (0.25 m) high. The shaft is a pillar with a square base 1 ft (0.30 m) wide tapering to a column 4 ft 8 in (1.42 m) high. At 4 ft 4 in (1.32 m) there is a collar with a bun-shaped capital. On its top is a socket that may have held the cross head or stone ball.

Affetside Cross was damaged in the 1890s by people mistakenly believing it concealed hidden treasure, and was repaired by the Lord of the manor. It marks the supposed halfway point between London and Edinburgh and Its origin remains a mystery though it is thought to date from medieval times or earlier. Its proximity to the Roman road has caused many to speculate it to be Roman but others consider it a medieval route marker for pilgrims en route to Whalley Abbey. There is another such cross at Holcombe Moor to the east and one at Bradshaw which has been removed. The theory is plausible as the old east–west packhorse trail was a major route for the passage of goods and people. Another explanation is it is a market cross from Jacobean or Georgian times but Affetside had no market charter though markets did exist without one. It may mark the site of an earlier beacon due to its dominant position. The loss of the cross head is undated and there is no proof it had one.

== Community ==
The Affetside Society is concerned with the appearance and amenities in the village. It lobbied Bury Metropolitan Borough Council to provide traffic calming measures to reduce the number of serious accidents caused by speeding vehicles. In November 2011 the traffic calming work was approved by the council, with a 20 mph speed limit becoming permanent and traffic chicanes and road markings to be implemented in early 2012. In 1981, the society planted daffodil bulbs, shrubs and trees along Watling Street to improve its appearance and built stone signs at each end of the village. It organises social events on the Millennium Green and distributes a newsletter to residents. The Millennium Green Trust, a registered charity, was formed to provide and oversee the "Millennium Green" in an initiative run by the Countryside Commission. It created a public open space on the disused bus turn-around next to the cross, which acts as a focal point for village activities. The village green is used for a spring boules competition, summer barbecues and the Christmas Carol service.

In January 2007, Bury Council considered making the village a conservation area to protect against what some see as misguided refurbishment and extension to old properties built in the pre-1800s Pennine vernacular. In May 2008, the council decided against the proposal after a community consultation in the village church.
