= Ian Butterworth (physicist) =

Particle physicist

Ian Butterworth CBE, FRS
- Born: 3 December 1930
- Died: 29 November 2013 (aged 82)
- Resting place: Kensal Green Cemetery
- Education: University of Manchester
- Spouse: Mary Therese Gough
- Children: Joanna Rachel (Jody)
- Awards: See list
- Scientific career
- Fields: Particle physics
- Workplaces: University of Manchester; AERE; CERN; Imperial College London; Lawrence Berkeley Lab; Queen Mary College
- Doctoral advisor: H J J Braddick

Ian Butterworth CBE FRS (3 December 1930 — 29 November 2013) was a particle physicist. His career included a period as a research director at CERN from 1983 to 1986. He was elected Fellow of the Royal Society in 1981, and was made Commander of the British Empire in 1984.

== Biography ==
Butterworth was born in Tottington on 3 January 1930, the elder of two sons of Harry Butterworth, an assistant examiner at the Aeronautical Inspection Directorate, and Beatrice (née Worsley).

His first school was in the village of Hawkshaw. He then attended Bolton Municipal Secondary School (Bolton County Grammar School from 1947, now known as Bolton St Catherine's Academy). Butterworth was particularly interested in physics, and gained a place at the University of Manchester. He graduated in 1951 and gained the Samuel Bright Research Award for the top physics student.

He joined Patrick Blackett's cosmic ray group at Manchester, where his research on photometric measurement of ionization in cloud chambers was supervised by H J J Braddick. He was awarded a PhD in 1954.

Butterworth then moved to Harwell, as a scientific officer at the UK Atomic Energy Research Establishment (AERE), where he conducted research on materials for the production of a cold neutron source. Then, in 1958, Butterworth was awarded a lectureship at Imperial College. He joined the High Energy Nuclear Physics group and worked on bubble chambers. In 1962 Ian led the Imperial group into an Anglo–German collaboration involving groups from six centres using the Saclay 81 cm chamber to take data of interactions produced by beams of pions generated by the CERN Proton Synchrotron. Two years later he took a year's leave of absence from Imperial College to take up a physicist position at the Lawrence Berkeley National Laboratory, "then considered the prime location for the investigation of the resonant states". He returned to Imperial in 1965 as a senior lecturer.

Butterworth was keen to make use of what he had learned in California, and an important task was to make sure that the department had sufficient computing power: a DEC PDP-6 was installed in 1966. It was used to control a Hough=Powell Device enabling the group to gain world-class expertise in the resonant states of particles. Having established this reputation, Butterworth was asked to take over as head of the bubble chamber group at the Rutherford High Energy Laboratory (RHEL), while retaining his position at Imperial.

Early in 1971 he was back with old colleagues at Berkeley for a short while, before returning to Imperial College later that year to take over as head of the High Energy group. In 1980 he additionally took over from Paul Taunton Matthews as head of the Physics Department. In 1983 he resigned from Imperial and moved to Geneva to become one of two research directors at CERN.

Butterworth was then invited to become principal of Queen Mary College, and so he returned to London in 1986. In this new role he had two major goals: (a) to develop a medical school by a merger with Barts and the London School of Medicine and Dentistry (finalized in 1989), and (b) to expand the College by a merger with Westfield College (completed in 1995, after Butterworth had retired in 1991).

=== Family ===
Ian Butterworth married Mary Therese Gough on 9 May 1964. They had one daughter, Joanna Rachel (Jody) in 1967.

He died on 29 November 2013, four days before his 83rd birthday, and was cremated on 13 December at Kensal Green Cemetery. Among the many tributes received were: "Ian was such a power for good at Imperial", and "Ian was a major force in physics and especially in the department!".

== Honours and awards ==
- Fellow of the Royal Society (1981)
- Awarded a CBE (1984)
- Fellow of the American Physical Society (1985}
- Honorary Member, Manchester Lit. and Phil. Soc. (1987)
- Fellow of Imperial College (1988)
- Dr hc Soka University (1989)
- Glazebrook Medal and Prize, Institute of Physics (1993)
