= Cox Green, Greater Manchester =

Coordinates: 53.620°N 2.428°W

Cox Green
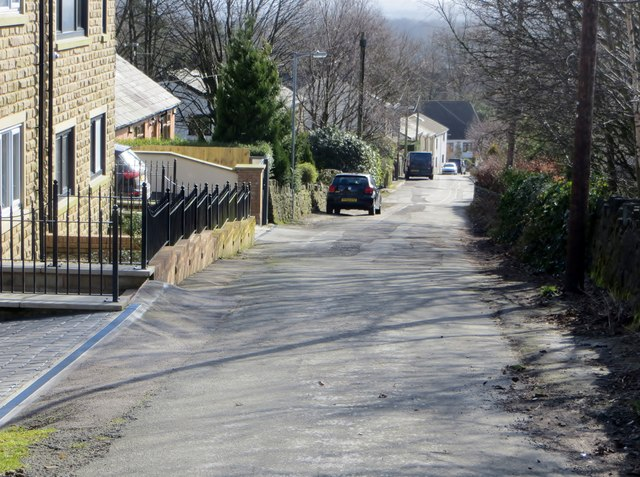
- Cox Green Road, Cox Green

- Location within Greater Manchester
- OS grid reference: SD716138
- Metropolitan borough: Bolton
- Metropolitan county: Greater Manchester
- Region: North West
- Country: England
- Sovereign state: United Kingdom
- Post town: BOLTON
- Postcode district: BL7
- Dialling code: 01204
- Police: Greater Manchester
- Fire: Greater Manchester
- Ambulance: North West
- UK Parliament: Bolton North East

Cox Green is a settlement near to Bolton within the Egerton district of Greater Manchester. It is primarily a residential town.

== Toponymy ==
Green is from Old English cocc "cock(i.e. crest of a hill) in the plural form coccs (the plural form represented by modern "s".). Due to corruption of the name over the years, the name is similar to the modern surname Cox (which it is similar to, but not quite related). The name was recorded as Cosse in 1108, and Couuse in 1146 and Cokksgrene in 1248. 'Green' is a modern addition, referring to the village common.

== Roads & transport ==
Cox Green is on the A666 road.
