= Bromley Cross =

Coordinates: 53.614°N 2.411°W

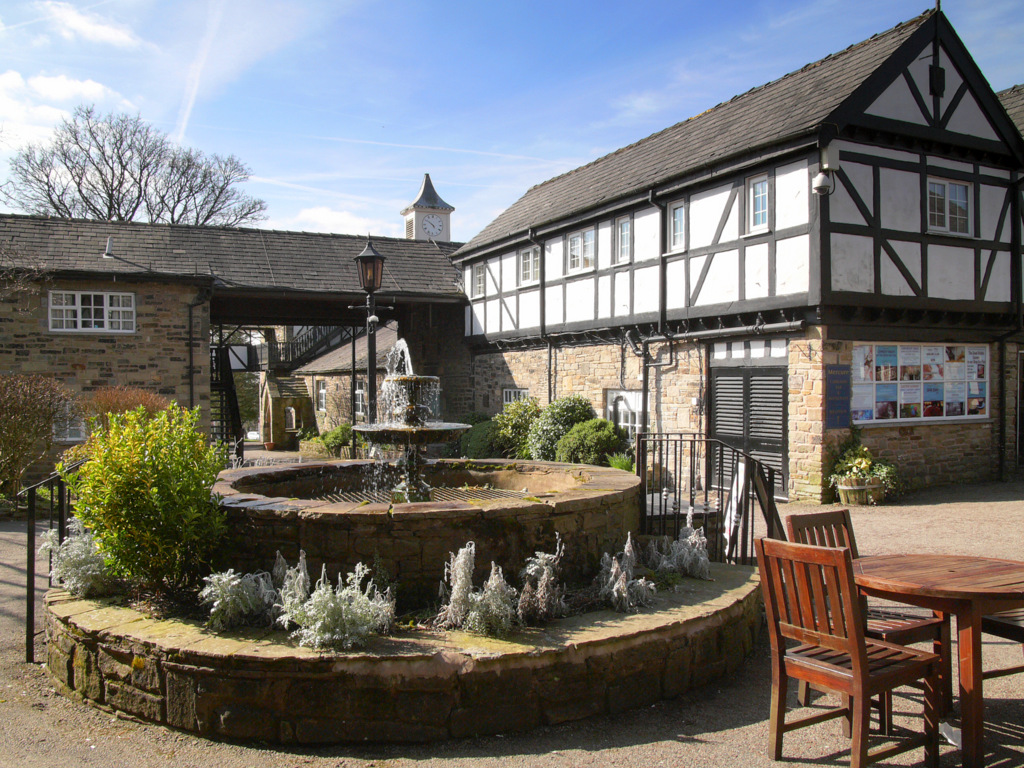
- Last Drop Village, Bromley Cross

- Location within Greater Manchester
- Population: (2011.Ward)
- OS grid reference: SD729131
- Metropolitan borough: Bolton
- Metropolitan county: Greater Manchester
- Region: North West
- Country: England
- Sovereign state: United Kingdom
- Post town: BOLTON
- Postcode district: BL7
- Dialling code: 01204
- Police: Greater Manchester
- Fire: Greater Manchester
- Ambulance: North West
- UK Parliament: Bolton North East

Bromley Cross is a residential area of South Turton in the Metropolitan Borough of Bolton, Greater Manchester, England. It gives its name to a larger electoral ward, which includes Eagley, Egerton, and Cox Green. Historically part of Lancashire, Bromley Cross lies on the southern edge of the West Pennine Moors.

Bromley Cross railway station is on the Ribble Valley Line.

In the 16th century, Arthur Bromley of Turton married Isabell Orrell, the granddaughter of the Lord of the manor of Turton. It is from this family the place derives its name. It is supposed that there may once have been an ancient cross in the locality, although no physical evidence of it has been found.

Bromley Cross is a residential area, and in the 19th century was part of the township of Turton, and from 1898 part of Turton Urban District. The village of Bromley Cross grew in the 19th century in association with many factories and bleachworks, which used water power obtained from the Eagley Brook and its tributaries.

In 2002, youth workers discovered young people congregated in abandoned underground World War II air raid tunnels belonging to Eagley Mills. The tunnels have since been sealed.

== Amenities ==
In the northern area of Bromley Cross is the "Last Drop Village", a collection of old farmhouses and farmbuildings which were restored in the 1960s into a pub, restaurant, bistro, craft shops, hotel and conference centre.

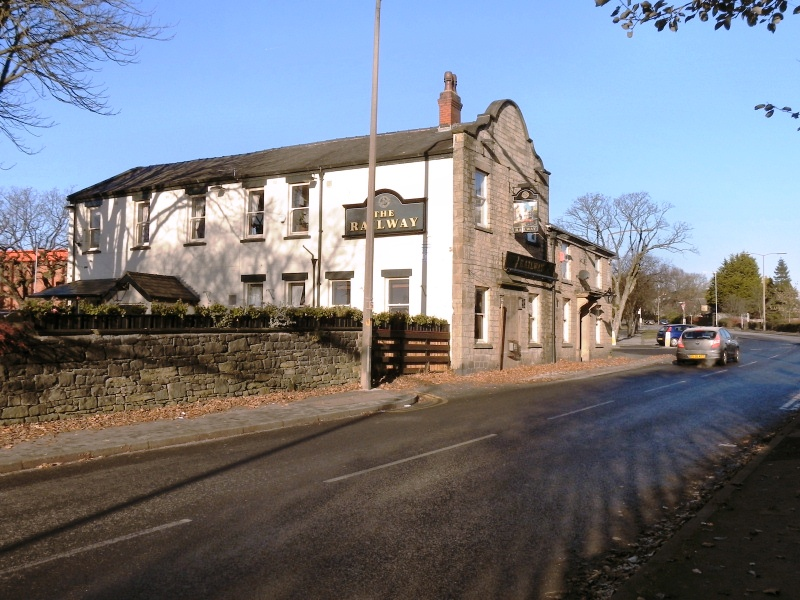
The Railway in 2010

Pubs in Bromley Cross include The Flag, The Sportsmans and the Spread Eagle. The Railway pub has repeatedly opened and closed, most recently closing in January 2023 after a fire.

== Education ==
The Bromley Cross area has one secondary school, Turton School, which was formerly a media and arts college. Birtenshaw School, a landmark educational facility providing services for children and young people with disabilities, was established in 1956. There are also several primary schools in the area, including Eagley Infant and Junior Schools and St John's RC Primary School.

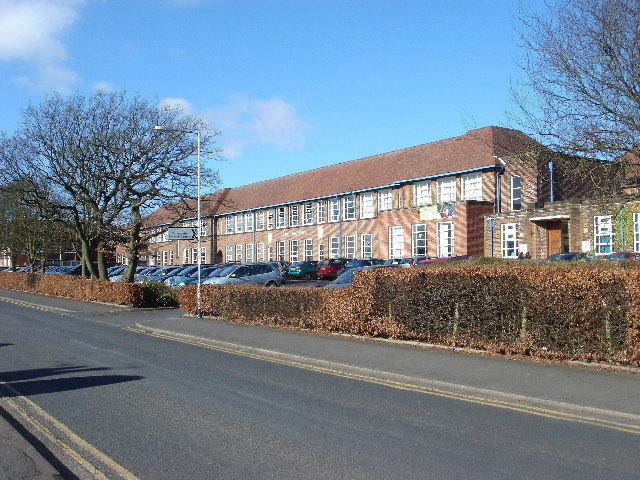
Turton School

== Notable residents ==
Numerous notable people live, or have lived, in the Bromley Cross area. These include:

- Sam Allardyce, football manager
- Garry Flitcroft, football player and property developer

== See also ==
- Listed buildings in South Turton
