= List of schools in Greater Manchester =

The List of schools in Greater Manchester, England is divided by metropolitan borough:

1. Manchester
2. Stockport
3. Tameside
4. Oldham
5. Rochdale
6. Bury
7. Bolton
8. Wigan
9. Salford
10. Trafford
