= BL3 =

BL3 could refer to:

- BL3, a postcode district in the BL postcode area
- Biosafety level 3
- Borderlands 3
