= Hamer's Brewery =

British brewery

- Company type: Private
- Industry: Brewery
- Founded: 1853

Hamer's Brewery, or Hamer's Ales was a brewery that was operated from the Volunteer Inn, Bromley Cross, Turton, by three generations of the Hamer family over a period of almost a century. The brewery was owned by the Hamers from 1853 until its sale to Dutton's Brewery in 1951. The whole of the Hamer's brewery including their properties were bought by Dutton's Blackburn Brewery in 1951 for £318,000. Dutton's in turn were taken over by Whitbread's in 1964.

By the turn of the 20th Century the Hamer family owned a number of public houses in the Turton area, and in Bolton town centre, including the following:

- Bolton Town Centre
  - The Academy, 148-150 Crook Street
  - The Blue Boar, 96 Deansgate
  - The Brown Cow, 153 Bradshawgate
  - The Queen's Hotel, 155 Bradshawgate
  - Town Hall Tavern, Victoria Square
  - The Victoria, Hotel Street
- Bolton District
  - The Volunteer, Bromley Cross
  - The Sportsman, Bromley Cross
  - The Flag Inn, Bromley Cross
  - The Strawberry Duck, Entwistle
  - The Farmers Arms, Quarlton
  - The House without a Name, Harwood
  - The Seven Stars, Harwood
  - The Lamb, Bradshaw Road
  - The Bulls Head, Bury New Road
  - The Printers Arms, Birches Road, Turton
  - The Gardeners Arms, Turton
  - The Derby Arms, Edgworth
  - The Edge Tavern, Chorley Old Road
  - The Colliers, Montserrat
  - The Carters Arms, Astley Bridge
  - The Bay Mare, Asley Bridge
  - The Pineapple, Asley Bridge
  - The Wilton, Belmont Road
  - The Cheetham, Dunscar
  - The Bradford Arms, Foundry Street
  - The Crawford Arms, Bolton Street
  - The Dog and Snipe, Folds Road
  - The Farmers Arms, Derby Street
  - The Lord Raglan, Halliwell Road
  - The Uncle Tom's Cabin, Lever Street
  - The Union Arms, Eskrick Street
  - The Weavers Arms, Brunel Street
  - The Cross Keys, Cross Street
  - The Rose & Crown, Cross Street
  - The Bridge Inn, Westhoughton
  - The Farmers Arms, Darcy Lever
  - The Old Original British Queen, Blackburn Road
