= St Maxentius' Church, Bradshaw =

Coordinates: 53.6058°N 2.4013°W

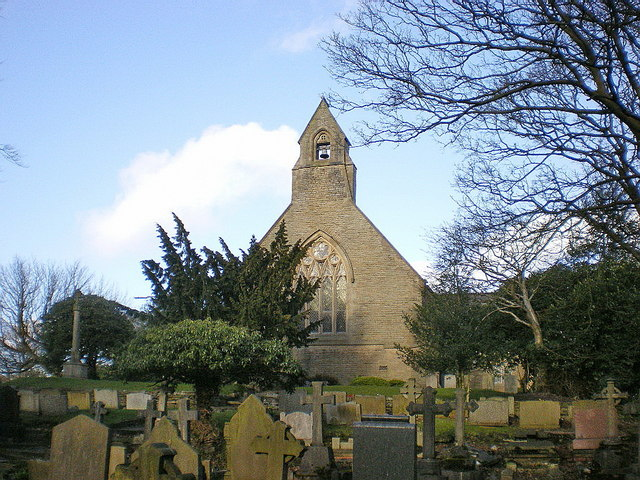
- West end of St Maxentius' Church, Bradshaw

- Location in Greater Manchester
- OS grid reference: SD 736,122
- Location: Bradshaw, Bolton, Greater Manchester
- Country: England
- Denomination: Anglican
- Website: St Maxentius, Bradshaw

History
- Status: Parish church
- Consecrated: 9 November 1872

Architecture
- Functional status: Active
- Heritage designation: Grade II (free-standing tower)
- Designated: 27 January 1967
- Architect: E. G. Paley (church)
- Architectural type: Church
- Style: Gothic (tower); Gothic Revival (church)
- Groundbreaking: 1863
- Completed: 1872

Administration
- Province: York
- Diocese: Manchester
- Archdeaconry: Bolton
- Deanery: Walmsley
- Parish: Bradshaw

Clergy
- Vicar: The Revd Janina Helen Margaret Ainsworth

St Maxentius' Church is in Bradshaw, Bolton, Greater Manchester, England. It is an active Anglican parish church in the deanery of Walmsley, the archdeaconry of Bolton and the diocese of Manchester. Its benefice is united with those of five other local churches. Standing separately from the church is the tower of an earlier church. The present church is dedicated to Saint Maxentius, an obscure French saint, and is the only church in England with this dedication.

== History ==
The earliest documentary evidence of a church at Bradshaw is in 1641–42, although a map of 1610 shows the presence of a chapel. This church was dedicated to Saint Mary. By 1722 the fabric of the church was in a bad condition, although it seems that it was then repaired. A new church was built of brick and stone in 1770. By the middle of the 19th century this church had become dilapidated, and it was too small for its congregation. A new church was designed by the Lancaster architect E. G. Paley. Its construction was slow, starting in 1863, and not being completed until 1872. It was consecrated on 9 November 1872 by Rt Revd James Fraser, Bishop of Manchester.

== Dedication ==
Members of the Lancashire and Cheshire Antiquarian Society who visited the church on 16 September 1899 were able to see the tower of the "old church" (presumably the 1770 construction) alongside the new church. The vicar at the time was the Revd R. K. Judson, MA. The report of the antiquarians' visit, led by Lieutenant-Colonel Gilbert J. French, son of local antiquarian Gilbert James French, notes that the church is the only one in England dedicated to Saint Maxentius. Colonel French speculated that the church's dedication to a Norman saint could be traced to the area's post-conquest history, with Roger de Poictou being appointed the first Earl of Lancaster and first lord of the manor of Bolton by his cousin William the Conqueror. French believed this suggested that a church had existed in Bradshaw at an early date. Maxentius lived much of his life in Poitou.

== Architecture ==
=== Church ===
The architectural style of the church is Decorated, and its windows have Geometric tracery. Its plan is cruciform, consisting of a long nave, transepts, a chancel, and a vestry. At the west end is a bellcote. The nave has a hammerbeam roof. The font is octagonal and is dated 1550. Above the partition of the north transept is a mosaic dating from the 1960s, depicting the life of Saint Maxentius. The stained glass includes two windows by Shrigley and Hunt. The glass in the east window dating from 1896 was probably designed by Almquist. In the south transept is an abstract window from the 1950s, possibly by R. Hayes.

=== Tower ===
The tower dates from 1640 and is constructed in coursed rubble. It is in two stages with diagonal buttresses. At the summit is a cornice and a battlemented parapet with splayed merlons. On the east side of the tower is a pair of doors, and on the north side is a blocked two-light straight-headed window. The bell openings have round heads. The tower is recorded in the National Heritage List for England as a designated Grade II listed building.

== External features ==
The churchyard contains the war graves of six soldiers of World War I, and one of World War II.

== See also ==
- List of churches in Greater Manchester
- List of ecclesiastical works by Paley and Austin
