= Listed buildings in South Turton =

South Turton is an unparished area in the Metropolitan Borough of Bolton, Greater Manchester, England, and includes the settlements of Bradshaw, Bromley Cross, Harwood, Dunscar, Eagley, and Egerton, and the surrounding countryside. The area contains 28 listed buildings that are recorded in the National Heritage List for England. Of these, two are listed at Grade II*, the middle of the three grades, and the others are at Grade II, the lowest grade. The listed buildings include houses and associated structures, farmhouses, farm buildings, former cotton mills, a church and an isolated church tower, a former school, a railway station, and a war memorial.

== Key ==
Grade	Criteria
II*	Particularly important buildings of more than special interest
II	Buildings of national importance and special interest

== Buildings ==
Name and location	Photograph	Date	Notes	Grade
Porch to Bradshaw Hall; 53.61135°N 2.40212°W		Early 17th century	The remaining porch to a house that has been demolished, it is in stone, and consists of a round-headed entrance with a hood mould. It is flanked by fluted columns on plinths, and has an entablature and a coped parapet. Inside are benches, an inner entrance and a coat of arms.	II
Tower to former Church of St Maxentius; 53.60599°N 2.40091°W		1640	The tower is in stone and has two stages. There are diagonal buttresses, a cornice, and an embattled parapet with roll mouldings and splayed merlons. On the east side are paired doors.	II
Barn, Bradshaw Hall Farm; 53.61161°N 2.40108°W	—	17th century	The barn, which was altered in the 19th century, is basically timber framed, and has stone walls quoins and a stone-slate roof. It has a rectangular plan, and most of the windows have quoined surrounds.	II
Dunscar Fold; 53.62085°N 2.43410°W	—	17th century	The house was extended to the east in the 19th century. It is in stone with quoins and a stone-slate roof. There are two storeys and an attic, the windows are mullioned, some with hood moulds. The original entrance is at the rear and has a quoined surround.	II
Harwood Lodge; 53.59608°N 2.37852°W	—	17th century	The house was extended in 1756, and it has been divided into two dwellings. It is in brick on a stone plinth with stone dressings, a stone-slate roof, two storeys, and seven bays. The second bay is canted, and in the fifth bay is a projecting two-storey porch with a sundial. The first two bays have quoins, a cornice and a balustrade. In the sixth bay is a French window, and elsewhere some windows are mullioned, and others are sashes. In the left return is a rusticated porch with an elliptical-arched opening, and a doorway with a fanlight and a pediment, and to the left is a two-storey bow window with a balustrade.	II
Howarth's Fold Farmhouse; 53.63427°N 2.44699°W		Late 17th century	The farmhouse is in stone with roofs of slate and stone-slate. It has two storeys and an L-shaped plan. In the north wing are mullioned windows and fire windows, and in the south wing the windows are casements, and there is an external staircase. The entrance is in the wall between the wings. Inside there are timber framed partitions.	II
Old Water Fold; 53.62035°N 2.39572°W	—	Late 17th century	A stone house with quoins and a stone-slate roof, two storeys with an attic, and two bays. The windows are mullioned, and at the rear are stair windows.	II
Top o'th' Knotts Farmhouse; 53.61397°N 2.38084°W	—	Late 17th century	The farmhouse is in stone with quoins and a slate roof. It has two storeys, four bays, and a rear outshut. Some of the windows are mullioned, but most are casements.	II
Walsh Fold; 53.62727°N 2.39538°W		Late 17th century	A farmhouse, later divided into two dwellings, it is in stone with quoins and a stone-slate roof. There are two storeys, four bays, and a rear outshut. On the front is a 20th-century porch, and the windows have double chamfered mullions, some with hood moulds. Inside is a bressumer and timber framed partitions.	II*
61 Brookfold Lane; 53.60559°N 2.38122°W	—	1681	A stone house with quoins and a slate roof, two storeys, two bays, and a rear wing. On the front is a gabled porch and mullioned windows, with a continuous hood mould above the ground floor. At the rear are casement windows, and a segmental-headed doorway with a dated lintel.	II
Holt's Fold Farmhouse and Cottage; 53.62365°N 2.41585°W		1690	The farmhouse, which was later extended, is in stone with some slate cladding at the rear, and a stone-slate roof. There are two storeys and four bays, the first bay being an addition. The first two bays project and are gabled. Most of the windows have double chamfered mullions, there is one sash window, and there are casement windows in the left return. There is an entrance in all the bays; in the first bay it is plain, the second bay has a gabled porch, the third a doorway with dated lintels, and the fourth bay has a hood mould.	II
Hough Fold; 53.59763°N 2.38069°W		c. 1700	A stone house with a slate roof, two storeys, three bays, and a rear wing. Most of the windows are mullioned, and the others are casements.	II
Lea Gate Farmhouse; 53.60499°N 2.39710°W		c. 1700	The farmhouse, later divided into two dwellings, is in stone with quoins and has a stone-slate roof with coped gables. There are two storeys, five bays, the third and fourth bays projecting forward under a gable, and rear extensions. The windows are mullioned, and the doorway has a decorated lintel.	II*
Barn, Lea Gate Farm; 53.60517°N 2.39737°W	—	1729	A stone barn with quoins and a stone-slate roof. Originally there were three bays, a bay was added later to the west and an extension in the 19th century to the south. It has various openings, some blocked, including pitching holes and ventilation slits, and there is an inscribed plaque with a moulded architrave.	II
Rigby Cottages; 53.60736°N 2.40386°W	—	Early to mid-18th century	Originally a house and attached farm building to the right, later two houses. They are in stone with quoins, and roofs partly of slate and partly of concrete tiles. There are two storeys and four bays. Three of the windows are mullioned, and the others are casements.	II
Brook Fold Farmhouse; 53.60506°N 2.38111°W	—	Mid-18th century	The farmhouse is in stone with a stone-slate roof, two storeys, two bys and a wing to the south. The windows in the main range are mullioned, and in the wing they are casements. In the main range is a doorway with a plain entrance, and in the wing is a round-headed doorway. At the rear are casement windows and a lean-to cow house.	II
Bridge Mill; 53.61368°N 2.42657°W		Late 18th century	Probably originally a cotton mill, it was extended in 1926, and later used for other purposes. The original part is in stone with a hipped slate roof, and the extension is in brick with stone bands. Both parts have two storeys on the south and three on the north, the original part has sides of nine and two bays, and the extension has three bays. There is a single-storey gabled projection at the west. The windows are sashes, and in the extension is an entrance with a pedimented parapet. (Note: Street View in August 2015 shows that the building has been converted into a terrace of houses.)	II
Eagley Bank; 53.61061°N 2.42844°W	—	Late 18th century (possible)	A house that was extended and remodelled in 1854 and again in about 1920. It is in ashlar stone with slate roofs. The main part has a moulded eaves cornice, two storeys, and a front of three bays. The central doorway has a Tuscan architrave and an elliptical fanlight. To the left is a canted bay window, and the other windows are sashes. A single-storey extension leads to a rear wing, which includes a conservatory. Beyond that is Eagley Cottage, built as a wing to the house, and a stable wing and coach house that include an Italianate clock tower.	II
Lower Knotts; 53.61200°N 2.38596°W	—	1795	A row of four stone houses with quoins on the left and roofs of stone-slate and concrete tiles. There are two storeys and five bays, the right two bays lower. On the front are two 20th-century porches, and a datestone in an architrave. Most of the windows are casements, some are mullioned, and there is one round-headed window with imposts and a keystone.	II
The Old Post Office; 53.60734°N 2.40122°W	—	Early 19th century	Originally a school, later a private house, it is in sandstone with a slate roof, two storeys and three bays. The central doorway has a pilasters, a fanlight and a pediment, and the windows are replacement sashes.	II
Dunscar House; 53.62042°N 2.43397°W	—	c. 1830	A stone house with a hipped slate roof. There are two storeys and five bays, the right two bays being recessed with an extruded corner. In the first three bays is a sill band, a top cornice, an Ionic porch and doorcase, and an elliptical-headed doorway. Most of the windows are sashes. In the end bay is a loggia with round arches, and the extruded corner has a round-headed window and a casement window.	II
Christ's Church, Harwood; 53.59497°N 2.38222°W		1840–41	The transept was added in 1847. The church is in stone with a slate roof, and consists of a nave with a south porch, a south transept, a chancel with north and south vestries, and a west steeple. The steeple has a tower with three stages, a round-headed west doorway, a top cornice, and a short spire with a cross finial. On the east gable is a bellcote.	II
Former Eagley Bridge School; 53.61469°N 2.42702°W		1851	The school, which is in Gothic Revival style, was extended in 1872 and again in the 20th century. It is in Darwen sandstone and has roofs of Welsh slate with coped gables. The school consists of a cross-wing flanked by projecting gabled wings, and with gabled porches in the angles. The windows in the original part are mullioned and transomed with pointed arches, and in the newer part they are mullioned with flat tops.	II
Walmsley School; 53.63535°N 2.44893°W	—	1851	The school was extended in 1906. It is in stone with a cornice, and a slate roof with coped gables. There is one storey, six bays, the end bay recessed and lower, and adjoining it is a three-bay extension. On the front is a gabled porch with a ball finial. The porch entrance and the windows have Tudor arched heads and hood moulds, and there is another entrance with a segmental head. The windows in the extension are casements.	II
Bromley Cross railway station 53.61404°N 2.41062°W		1859	The station was built by the Lancashire and Yorkshire Railway, and the signal box followed in 1875. The station building is in sandstone and the signal box is in brick, both with slate roofs. The station building has a single storey, coped gables, mullioned windows, and chamfered surrounds to the openings. The signal box has two storeys and a hipped roof. Also included in the listing is a short section of the low level platform.	II
Valley Mill; 53.61452°N 2.42826°W		1881	The former cotton mill is in brick, with an internal structure of brick and concrete, and a flat concrete roof. There are four storeys, and sides of 16 and four bays. In the entrance front are central doorways, above which are two large windows with terracotta decoration. On the northeast corner is a bell cupola, and to the west are an engine house, a boiler house, and a chimney with a corbelled cap.	II
Brook Mill; 53.61413°N 2.42658°W		1887	The former cotton mill, later used for other purposes, is in brick with stone bands, a ground floor in rusticated stone, and a multi-ridge slate roof. The internal structure is in cast iron, steel and concrete. The building has five storeys, and sides of 14 and six bays. On the entrance front is a stair tower with a pedimented terracotta parapet, above which is a clock. To the left of the tower is a gabled porch, and projecting from the northwest is the former engine house and boiler house.	II
Dunscar War Memorial; 53.62294°N 2.43506°W		1921	The war memorial is in an enclosure at a road junction, and consists of a base of three steps, a plinth, and a tapering pedestal, all in stone. On the pedestal is a copper statue of a soldier standing over his rifle with a bowed head. On the front of the memorial is an inscription, and on the sides are the names of those lost during the First World War.	II

== Notes and references ==
=== Sources ===
- Historic England, "Porch to Bradshaw Hall to south of Bradshaw Hall Fold, Bolton (1067309)", National Heritage List for England
- Historic England, "Tower to former Church of St Maxentius, Bolton (1162611)", National Heritage List for England
- Historic England, "Barn at Bradshaw Hall Farm, Bolton (1067275)", National Heritage List for England
- Historic England, "Dunscar Fold, Bolton (1162678)", National Heritage List for England
- Historic England, "Harwood Lodge, Bolton (1356805)", National Heritage List for England
- Historic England, "Howarth's Fold Farmhouse, Bolton (1067306)", National Heritage List for England
- Historic England, "Old Water Fold, Bolton (1356802)", National Heritage List for England
- Historic England, "Top o'th' Knotts Farmhouse, Bolton (1309433)", National Heritage List for England
- Historic England, "Walsh Fold, Bolton (1067308)", National Heritage List for England
- Historic England, "No. 61 Brookfield Lane, Bolton (1162671)", National Heritage List for England
- Historic England, "Holt's Fold Farmhouse and Cottage, Bolton (1309521)", National Heritage List for England
- Historic England, "Hough Fold, Bolton (1067311)", National Heritage List for England
- Historic England, "Lea Gate Farmhouse, Bolton (1162725)", National Heritage List for England
- Historic England, "Barn to north-west of Lea Gate Farmhouse, Bolton (1356804)", National Heritage List for England
- Historic England, "Rigby Cottages, Bolton (1067312)", National Heritage List for England
- Historic England, "Brook Fold Farmhouse, Bolton (1356803)", National Heritage List for England
- Historic England, "Bridge Mill (formerly known as Old Mill Building), Bolton (1388031)", National Heritage List for England
- Historic England, "Eagley Bank, Bolton (1387860)", National Heritage List for England
- Historic England, "Lower Knotts, Bolton (1162767)", National Heritage List for England
- Historic England, "The Old Post Office, Bolton (1356787)", National Heritage List for England
- Historic England, "Dunscar House, Bolton (1067310)", National Heritage List for England
- Historic England, "Christ's Church, Bolton (1162799)", National Heritage List for England
- Historic England, "Former Eagley Bridge School, Bolton (1388260)", National Heritage List for England
- Historic England, "Walmsley School to south of Unitarian Chapel, Bolton (1309568)", National Heritage List for England
- Historic England, "Bromley Cross railway station (including signal box and low level platform), Bolton (1422397)", National Heritage List for England
- Historic England, "Valley Mill (former Spinning Mill No. 2), Bolton (1388078)", National Heritage List for England
- Historic England, "Brook Mill (former No. 3 Twist Mill), Bolton (1388079)", National Heritage List for England
- Historic England, "Dunscar War Memorial, Bolton (1391212)", National Heritage List for England
- Historic England, Listed Buildings
- Hartwell, Clare; Hyde, Matthew; Pevsner, Nikolaus (2004), Lancashire: Manchester and the South-East, The Buildings of England, New Haven and London: Yale University Press, ISBN 0-300-10583-5
