= South Turton =

Coordinates: 53.606°N 2.400°W

- Location within Greater Manchester
- Population: 25,067 (Area Forum, 2007)
- OS grid reference: SD735122
- Metropolitan borough: Bolton
- Metropolitan county: Greater Manchester
- Region: North West
- Country: England
- Sovereign state: United Kingdom
- Post town: Bolton
- Postcode district: BL2, BL7
- Dialling code: 01204
- Police: Greater Manchester
- Fire: Greater Manchester
- Ambulance: North West
- UK Parliament: Bolton North East

South Turton is part of the Metropolitan Borough of Bolton, in Greater Manchester, England. There is no settlement or administrative area of South Turton; instead the name is a modern coinage to describe the area transferred to Bolton in 1974 from the former Turton Urban District in Lancashire. The area forms part of the built up area of Bolton, with the main suburbs within the area being Bradshaw and Bromley Cross. South Turton lies on the southern slopes of the West Pennine Moors, and had a population of 25,067 in 2007.

Turton Urban District was abolished in 1974 and was divided between the Bolton district of Greater Manchester and the Blackburn district of Lancashire. The northern part of Turton, including the village itself (now generally known as Chapeltown), became a civil parish called North Turton. In contrast, no parish was created for the part of the former urban district transferred to Bolton. As well as Bradshaw and Bromley Cross, South Turton includes Eagley, Egerton and Harwood.

Between 2000 and 2008, Bolton council ran a South Turton Area Forum as a committee for local issues to be discussed. The South Turton Area Forum was abolished in 2008 being split into separate forums for each electoral ward, with the council having decided the forums needed to be more relevant to local communities.

== Electoral wards ==
South Turton has two electoral wards – Bromley Cross and Bradshaw. Each ward has three councillors who represent the area on Bolton Metropolitan Borough Council.

== Education ==
Primary schools

- St Maxentius C. of E. Primary School, New Heys Way, Bradshaw
- Eagley Infant School, Stonesteads Drive, Bromley Cross
- Eagley Junior School, Chapeltown Road, Bromley Cross
- St John the Evangelist R.C. School, Darwen Road, Bromley Cross
- Egerton Community Primary School, Cox Green Road, Egerton
- Walmsley C.of E. Primary School, Blackburn Road, Egerton
- Christ's Church C. of E. Primary School, Stitch-mi-Lane, Harwood
- Hardy Mill Primary School, Belmont View, Harwood
- Harwood Meadows Primary School, Orchard Gardens, Harwood
- St Brendan's R.C. Primary School, Brookfold Lane, Harwood

Secondary schools

- Canon Slade School, Bradshaw Brow, Bradshaw
- Turton School and Sixth Form, Bromley Cross Road, Bromley Cross

== See also ==
- Listed buildings in South Turton
