= Egerton, Greater Manchester =

Coordinates: 53.625°N 2.437°W

Egerton
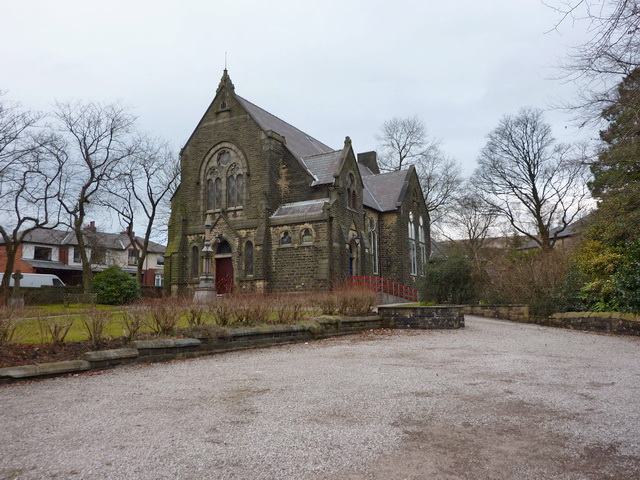
- Egerton United Reformed Church

- Location within Greater Manchester
- OS grid reference: SD711143
- Metropolitan borough: Bolton
- Metropolitan county: Greater Manchester
- Region: North West
- Country: England
- Sovereign state: United Kingdom
- Post town: BOLTON
- Postcode district: BL7
- Dialling code: 01204
- Police: Greater Manchester
- Fire: Greater Manchester
- Ambulance: North West
- UK Parliament: Bolton North East

Egerton, (pronounced "edgerton"), is a village in the northern part of the Metropolitan Borough of Bolton, Greater Manchester, England. Historically a part of Lancashire, it is situated three miles north of Bolton and 12 miles north west of Manchester city centre within the West Pennine Moors.

Egerton was originally part of the township of Turton in the ancient parish of Bolton-le-Moors and consisted of a small, remote, farming community known as Walmsley. The name Egerton was brought to the area in 1663 when Ralph Egerton married the step-daughter of James Walmsley, after which their property became known as Egerton's. The village developed in the 1830s when Henry and Edmund Ashworth set up cotton mills. Egerton formed part of the Turton Urban District in Lancashire between 1894 and 1974, when the district was abolished. The more urban southern part of the district, including Egerton, was then transferred to Bolton in Greater Manchester.

The village is a commuter suburb for Bolton, Blackburn and Manchester. Egerton is located a short distance from Bromley Cross and Tonge Moor, close to Canon Slade School in Bradshaw and Turton School.

Parts of Egerton were designated a conservation area by Bolton Council in 1981 to protect the character of the village. The conservation area contains a wide variety of buildings dating from the early 19th Century to the present day. It contains two Grade II listed buildings, and comprises frontages to the Blackburn Road (A666) and a number of side streets, Egerton Cricket Ground, Egerton Park, the grounds of Egerton House and Christ Church.

To the west of Egerton is Gale Clough and Shooterslee Wood, a Site of Special Scientific Interest designated for its biological interest. The site is 8.6 hectares (21 acres) and is important due to its broad-leaved woodland which is among the most important in Greater Manchester.

Egerton was the birthplace of Bolton Wanderers F.C., which started there as Christ Church F.C. in 1874.

== See also ==
- Listed buildings in South Turton
