= Christ Church, Walmsley =

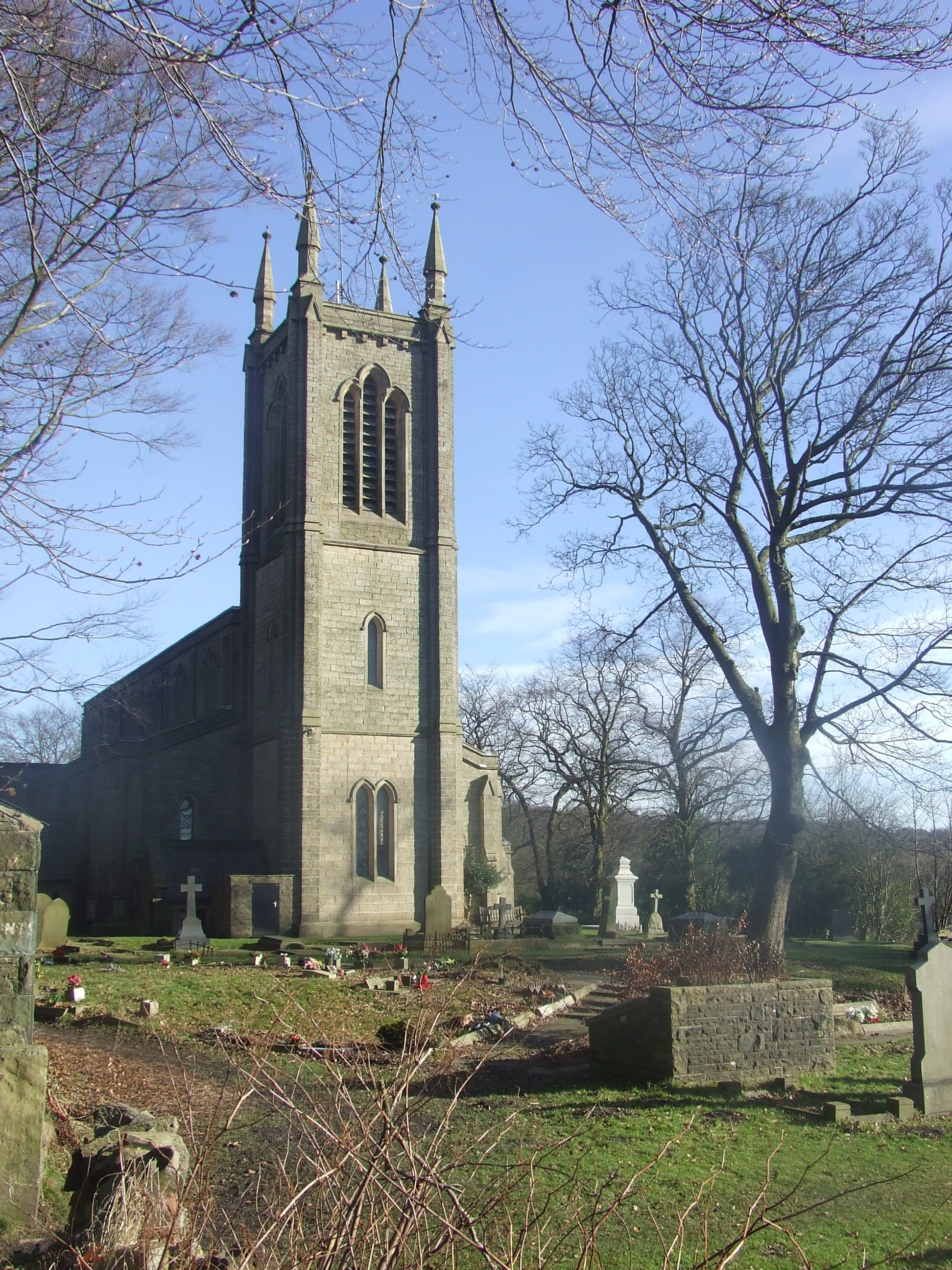
- Christ Church, Walmsley, from the northwest
- Christ Church, Walmsley
- 53.6236°N 2.4389°W
- OS grid reference: SD 711,142
- Location: Blackburn Road, Walmsley, Egerton, Greater Manchester
- Country: England
- Denomination: Church of England

History
- Status: Parish church
- Consecrated: 3 October 1839

Architecture
- Functional status: Active
- Heritage designation: Grade II
- Designated: 19 August 1986
- Architect: Edmund Sharpe
- Architectural type: Church
- Style: Gothic Revival
- Years built: 1837-1867
- Groundbreaking: 1837

Administration
- Province: York
- Diocese: Manchester
- Archdeaconry: Bolton
- Deanery: Walmsley
- Parish: Walmsley

Clergy
- Rector: Revd Stephen Parsons

Christ Church is in Blackburn Road, Walmsley, Egerton, Greater Manchester, England. It is an active Church of England parish church in the deanery of Walmsley, the archdeaconry of Bolton, and the diocese of Manchester. The church is recorded in the National Heritage List for England as a designated Grade II listed building.

== History ==
Walmsley was the old name for the present village of Egerton. The first known building there was originally a chapel of ease in the ancient parish of Bolton le Moors. The date that this original chapel was built is not known, but the Diocesan Church Calendar stated that it existed in 1500 and the first documentary evidence appears to be in the "Inventories of Church Goods 1552". The chapel was rebuilt in 1771, but was demolished in 1839. Colonel JW Slater had the old site excavated in the early 1900s and found three older layers under the Georgian chapel, the lowest, he supposed to be of late Saxon origin, being an equal-legged cross in plan. The upper layers had an extended main leg. The church was originally completed in 1839 and designed by the Lancaster architect Edmund Sharpe. It was the first substantial church with aisles to be designed by Sharpe. Although the estimated cost was £2,150, the actual cost was £3,557 (equivalent to £320,000 in 2025), towards which a grant of £300 was given by the Incorporated Church Building Society. The church provided seating for 512 people. It was consecrated on 3 October 1839 by Rt Rev John Bird Sumner, then the Bishop of Chester. Organ and Quire Gallery added 1843, Chancel, Organ Chamber, Vicar's Vestry and Transepts were added in 1867 to the design of Edward Paley of Sharpe and Paley, Lancaster.

== Architecture ==
=== Exterior ===
Christ Church was constructed in Pennine sandstone from the local Cox Green Quarry with ashlar dressings and a slate roof. Its plan consists of a six-bay nave, with a clerestory, north and south aisles, north and south transepts, and a chancel with an organ loft to the south and a lean-to vestry to the north. The tower is at the west end; it is in three stages, separated by string courses. There are twin lancet windows in the lower stage, single lancets in the middle stage and stepped lancets in the top stage containing louvred bell openings. The plain parapet is corbelled, and corner buttresses rise to a pinnacle at each corner.

=== Interior ===
Inside the church, the arcades are carried on monolithic piers (made from single pieces of stone). They are 12 feet (3.7 m) high, excluding capitals and stub-bases and are carved into four shafts around a central spine. (earlier references to 16 ft ht are incorrect) The west gallery is supported on two cast iron columns. The panelled reredos dates from 1872 and side panels were added in 1908; all the panels depict scenes in mosaic. The chapel in the south transept contains an altar with a canopy and another reredos. These were added to the church in 1952 to accommodate a 15th-century painted predella. This is divided into three sections containing depictions of Christ before Pilate, Man of Sorrows, and the Lamentation; the sections are separated by gilded tracery. The war memorial, dating from about 1920, is in alabaster, and depicts an angel and a wreath. The stained glass in the east window dates from 1872 is by William Wailes, and that in the south transept, dating from 1896 is by Ballantyne and Gardiner. In the nave, in windows facing each other, is glass designed by Edward Burne-Jones and made by Morris & Co. in 1889. The font, which carries a dedication dated 1845, was moved here from Bolton Parish Church in 1952. The three-manual Compton organ dates from 1934 in Liverpool and was eventually taken from the Bolton Odeon Cinema and installed in the church in 1968, replacing an earlier organ of 1892. This was itself a rebuild of an earlier organ.

== External features ==
The churchyard contains the war graves of seven soldiers from World War I, and a soldier, an airman and a Royal Navy sailor of World War II.

== See also ==
- List of architectural works by Edmund Sharpe
