= Eagley Mills =

Coordinates: 53.614°N 2.427°W

Eagley Mills is a complex of former cotton mills in Eagley, Bolton, England. The complex is adjacent to a model village originally built for the millworkers. The surviving mill buildings have since been converted to residential use.

Textile mills had existed on the site since the late 18th century, taking advantage of the Eagley Brook which flows through the site to power the machinery. The Chadwick brothers, James and Robert, began to redevelop the site in the 1820s. When James died in 1829 his brother amalgamated the business of Chadwick and Brother with that of J.N. Philips of Manchester, after which the model village was founded with houses, a school, a bowling green, a cricket pitch and a library. A park with a bandstand was created in 1850 where the Eagley Mills Band would play. The mills were converted from water power to steam in 1840.

In 1871 the first of the large modern mill buildings was built on the north side of the river. This was to be known as No 3 Twist Mill (and now called Brook Mill). No 2 Twist Mill (now called Valley Mill) was built nearby in 1881 and the third and largest mill, No 1 Spinning Mill, was built in 1894. By then the company operated some 50,000 spindles and employed some 2000 workers.

The mills were managed at one point by Arthur Greg, grandson of Samuel Greg, the founder of Quarry Bank Mill in Styal. In 1896 Chadwicks merged into the textile conglomerate of J & P Coats, who finally ceased production at Eagley in 1972, making 600 workers redundant. For the next few decades the buildings were used for a variety of industrial and commercial activities.

== Bridge Mill ==
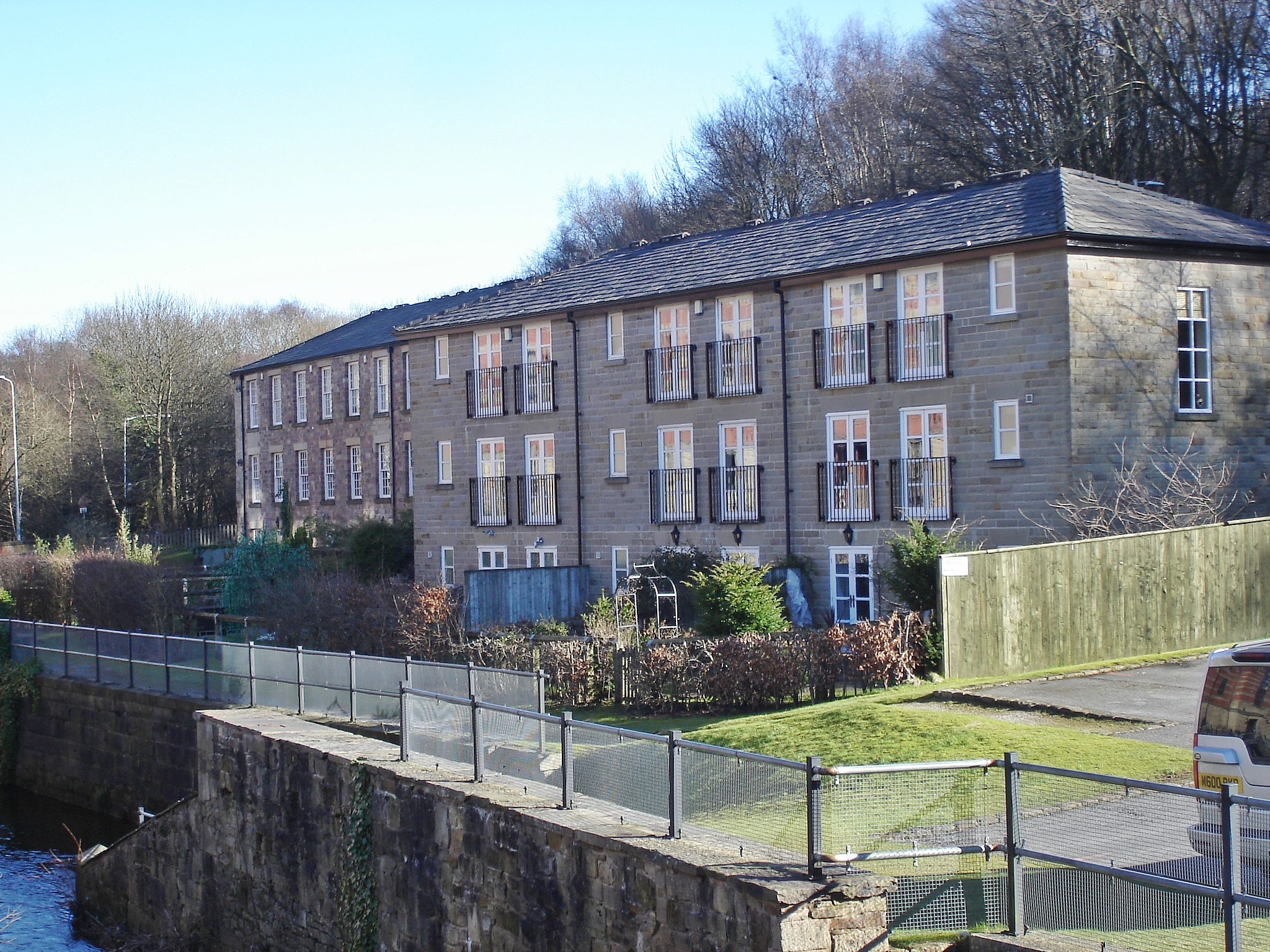
Bridge Mill (at left of picture)

Built on the south side of the Eagley Brook around 1780 as a water-powered textile mill, it was later used as a canteen for the larger developments on the other side of the river. It was built of stone in two storeys and is a Grade II listed building.

In 2003 it was converted into 5 stone cottages. A new row of cottages has since been built in line with the old, replicating the style of the original.

== No 3 Mill (Brook Mill) ==
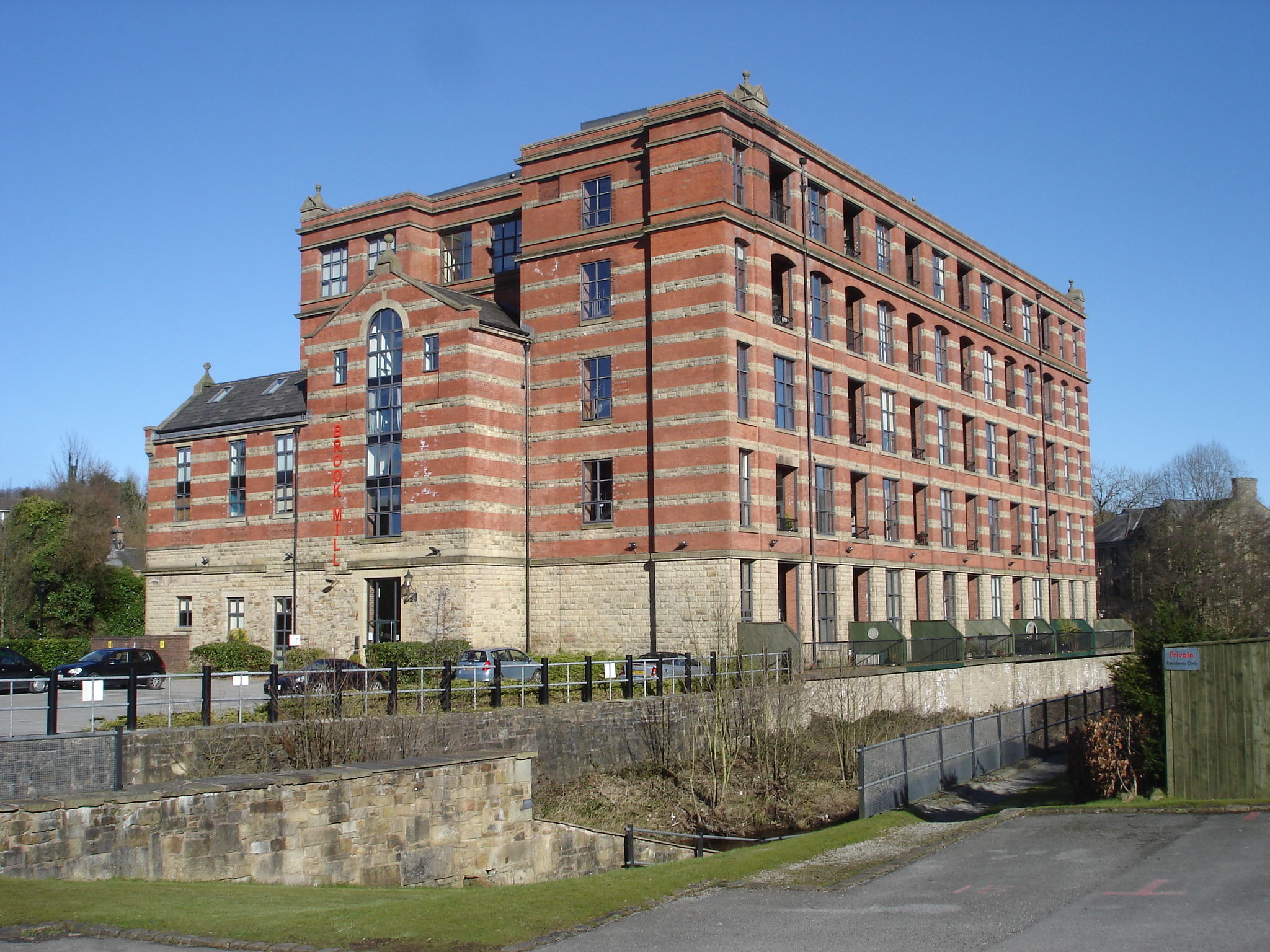
Brook Mill

The original building, built in 1871, was burned out in 1886 and was rebuilt in 1887 as the present building, which is Grade II listed. It is built of brick in 5 storeys with stone banding and a slate roof and a rectangular floor plan of 14 by 6 bays. It was mainly used for finishing and winding until 1903, after which it carried out twisting and winding.

In 2003 it was converted to residential accommodation and now has 64 apartments on four floors, several of which have waterside terraces. Four of the penthouses have roof terraces.

== No 2 Mill (Valley Mill) ==
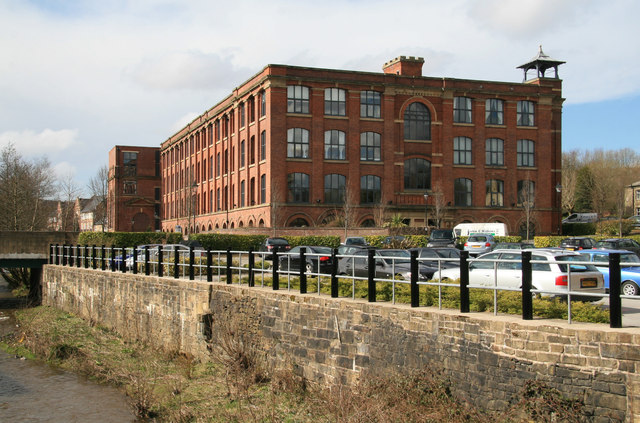
Valley Mill

Built in 1881, it is a Grade II listed building. Originally built as a twist mill it was converted to a ring spinning mill in 1903. It is built of brick and cast iron in four storeys with a flat roof, 16 bays in length by 6 bays from front to back. It has a bell cupola in one corner and was originally steam powered, having an 800hp single cylinder engine by Hick, Hargreaves & Co..

In 2001 it was also converted to residential use and now houses 76 loft-style apartments on three main floors. Some lofts have waterside verandahs.

== No 1 Mill ==
No 1 Mill, the largest of the group, was built in 1894 but has since been demolished.

== See also ==
- Listed buildings in South Turton
- List of mills in Bolton
