= Harwood, Greater Manchester =

Coordinates: 53.597°N 2.377°W

Harwood
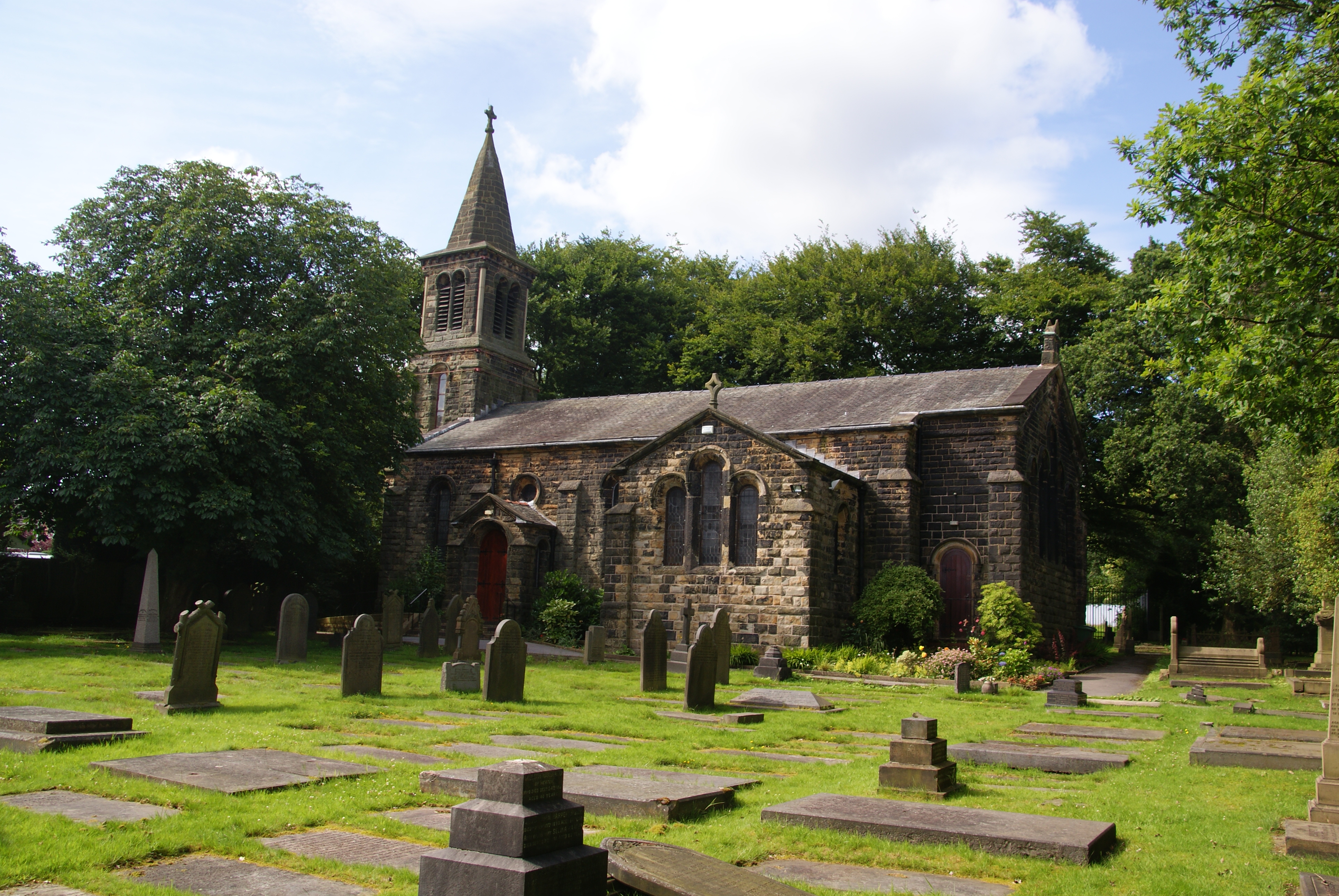
- Christ's Church

- Location within Greater Manchester
- OS grid reference: SD751113
- Metropolitan borough: Bolton
- Metropolitan county: Greater Manchester
- Region: North West
- Country: England
- Sovereign state: United Kingdom
- Post town: BOLTON
- Postcode district: BL2
- Dialling code: 01204
- Police: Greater Manchester
- Fire: Greater Manchester
- Ambulance: North West
- UK Parliament: Bolton North East

Harwood is a suburb to the north-northeast of Bolton, Greater Manchester, England, bordering Bury. Harwood is also part of the historic county of Lancashire.

== History ==
Harwood Inclosure Act 1797
- Act of Parliament
- Parliament of Great Britain
- Long title: An act for dividing, allotting, and enclosing the commons and waste grounds, within the township of Harwood, in the county palatine of Lancaster.
- Citation: 37 Geo. 3. c. 56
- Territorial extent: Great Britain

Dates
- Royal assent: 24 April 1797
- Commencement: 24 April 1797 (Note: The Acts of Parliament (Commencement) Act 1793.)

Status: Current legislation

The township was recorded as Harewode in 1212 and 1302. The manor which included Bradshaw, was part of the Manchester fee held by the Grelleys in the Middle Ages. In 1212 it was divided, the parts held by Roger de Samlesbury and Alexander de Harwood. The Samlesbury portion descended in the same way as Breightmet and the Harwood portion to the Traffords of Trafford who sold it in 1589 and afterwards much divided. The Radcliffes and Bartons of Smithills Hall held land in Harwood for many generations and Adam Mort of Astley held a messuage and a fulling mill in 1630. In 1612, Sir Nicholas Mosley and his son, Edward, conveyed the manor of Harwood to a partnership of five yeomen; Matthew Harrison, Henry Haworth, Raufe Higson, Lawrence Horrocks and Edward Greenhalgh. In the Hearth tax returns of 1666, forty-two hearths were liable to tax but only one house had three hearths. The common lands were enclosed, under the Harwood Inclosure Act 1797 (37 Geo. 3. c. 56), in 1801. Christ Church was built in 1840 and Wesleyan and Primitive Methodist chapels were also built.

Harwood was included in the Atlas Linguarum Europae as a site for dialect research.

== Governance ==
Lying within the boundaries of the historic county of Lancashire since the early 12th century, Harwood was a township and chapelry in the ecclesiastical parish of Bolton le Moors in the hundred of Salford. In 1837 it became part of the Bolton Poor Law Union which took responsibility for funding the Poor Law in that area. In 1866 Harwood became a separate civil parish, on 30 September 1898 the parish was abolished and merged with Turton and became part of Turton Urban District. In 1891 the parish had a population of 1564.

== Geography ==
Harwood is 2 1/2 miles north east of Bolton in the West Pennine Moors to the north of the road to Bury. Bradshaw Brook separates it from Tonge. The township covered about 1,240 acres (5.0 km^{2}) of hilly land, the highest point is 825 feet (251 m) at Bowstone Hill and the lowest 300 feet (91 m). Stone was quarried and the brooks used by bleachworks. The underlying rocks are coal measures, sandstones and shales.

Originally a small village within the former Turton Urban District, but now a small part of the Metropolitan Borough of Bolton. Harwood is mostly residential, with most businesses and shops concentrated around a Morrisons supermarket at its centre. Neighbouring districts include Affetside, Bradshaw and Breightmet.

There are several public houses; (House Without a Name, The Plough, Grey Mare, Bill 'n' Coo, Crofters and the White Horse) many serving food, a medical practice, library, large park (Longsight Park also containing Bolton arboretum) and a small playground off Recreation Street. Numerous footpaths leading out to the West Pennine Hills.

== Transport ==
Harwood is served by the 507 bus from Bolton. On Monday to Saturday weekdays, the 480 runs hourly running between Bolton and Bury, via Bradshaw, Harwood, Affetside and Tottington. The nearest railway stations are located at Hall i' th' Wood within walking distance on the main road and Bromley Cross within the public footpaths in Bradshaw.

== Education ==
Primary schools in the area are St Brendan's, St Maxentius, Harwood Meadows, Hardy Mill. The popular secondary school for residents of Harwood is Turton High School in Bromley Cross, though both Canon Slade and Bolton St Catherine's Academy are nearby.

== Notable people ==
- Gabriel Clark (born 1998), actor (Hollyoaks, Tip Toe)

== See also ==
- Listed buildings in South Turton
