= Hawkshaw, Greater Manchester =

Coordinates: 53.630°N 2.365°W

Hawkshaw
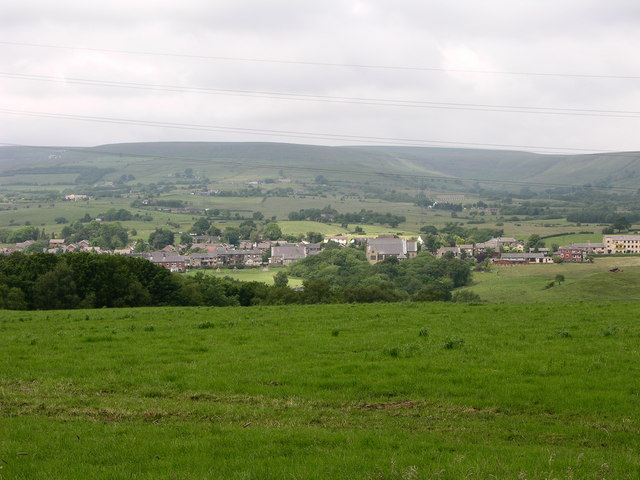
- Hawkshaw from Affetside

- Location within Greater Manchester
- OS grid reference: SD758149
- Metropolitan borough: Bury
- Metropolitan county: Greater Manchester
- Region: North West
- Country: England
- Sovereign state: United Kingdom
- Post town: BURY
- Postcode district: BL8
- Dialling code: 01204
- Police: Greater Manchester
- Fire: Greater Manchester
- Ambulance: North West
- UK Parliament: Bury North

Hawkshaw is a village in the Metropolitan Borough of Bury, in Greater Manchester, England. Historically a part of Lancashire, it has a population of around 1,000 people. The village had a small shop which is now closed and 2 pubs called The Red Lion and The Waggon and Horses.

On the A676, west of Greenmount, the road changes its name from Bolton Road to Ramsbottom Road after it crosses Kirklees Brook.

The village school is called St Mary's Church of England Primary School. It currently educates around 100 pupils and employs 6 teachers. The school is also connected to St Mary's Church, which is also Church of England.

There is a large playing field known to the locals as "the rec". There is a large football pitch, which is currently unused. The children's play area has both adult and toddler swings, a large slide, rocking chairs, and roundabout and a see-saw. The park is enclosed by a low fence. At the end of "the rec", there is a large tennis club, with a club house and 5 tennis courts, 3 of which are under flood-lights.

Hawkshaw has an Army Training Camp used as the HQ of the Greater Manchester Army Cadet Force. The adjoining Holcombe Ranges is one of the shooting ranges in the United Kingdom. The Physical Ability round of The Krypton Factor was filmed at the base's Assault Course on Holcombe Moor, north of Hawkshaw.

The A676 road passes through Hawkshaw.
