= Eagley =

Coordinates: 53.617°N 2.432°W

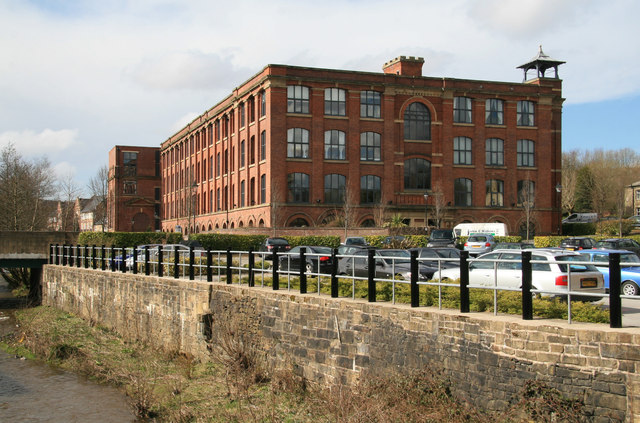
- Valley Mill, Eagley

- Location within Greater Manchester
- OS grid reference: SD715135
- Metropolitan borough: Bolton
- Metropolitan county: Greater Manchester
- Region: North West
- Country: England
- Sovereign state: United Kingdom
- Post town: BOLTON
- Postcode district: BL7
- Dialling code: 01204
- Police: Greater Manchester
- Fire: Greater Manchester
- Ambulance: North West
- UK Parliament: Bolton North East

Eagley is a village of the unparished area of South Turton, in the Metropolitan Borough of Bolton, Greater Manchester, England. Historically part of Lancashire, it lies on southern slopes of the West Pennine Moors.

Eagley Brook passes through the village and runs by Eagley Mills which are now converted flats which overlook the river.

Association football club Eagley F.C. are based in the village. A previous club, also called Eagley, were the first ever opponents of Preston North End in 1878–79.

Eagley Cricket Club currently plays in the Bolton Cricket League.

== See also ==
- Listed buildings in South Turton
