= Ladybridge High School =

Location
- New York; Junction Road; Deane; Bolton, Greater Manchester, BL3 4NG; England; 53.56669°N 2.47522°W

Information
- Former name: Deane Grammar School
- Type: Community school
- Established: 1969
- Local authority: Bolton Council
- Department for Education URN: 134646 Tables
- Ofsted: Reports
- Headteacher: Patrick Russell
- Gender: Mixed
- Age: 11 to 16
- Enrollment: 989 pupils as of April 2022
- Colours: Red and Dark Blue
- Website: www.ladybridgehigh.co.uk

Ladybridge High School is a mixed secondary school located in the Deane area of Bolton, Greater Manchester, England.

== History ==
The Deane School was built in 1969 as a grammar school and a secondary modern school on the same site, a fact reflected in the mirrored architecture of the school buildings. It later became a comprehensive school with pupils split into two "populations" and forms named after the letters of the school name. Today it is a community school administered by Bolton Metropolitan Borough Council.

The Deane School also had the rare distinction of a school farm, which is still part of Ladybridge High School. This was established on 4 January 1970, by Fred Tyldesley, to help children from its mostly urban catchment area to experience working with animals. As well as conventional livestock the farm became a centre for rare and endangered species, including pygmy goats and pot-bellied pigs.

During the late 1980s Deane School had as headmaster a capped England footballer, Warren Bradley.

After a period of decline at the turn of the century, the Deane School was put into special measures by Ofsted due to a series of poor inspection results. In 2004 the school was reopened as part of the 'Fresh Start' programme and was renamed Ladybridge High School. As part of this Ladybridge High became part of the Brook Learning Partnership – a collaborative partnership with Rivington and Blackrod High School.

== Academics ==
Ladybridge High School offers GCSEs, Cambridge Nationals and the DiDA courses. The school has a specialism in sports and offers its sports facilities for use by the local community.
