= Turton Urban District =

Historical government district in Lancashire, England

Coordinates: 53.6313°N 2.4018°W

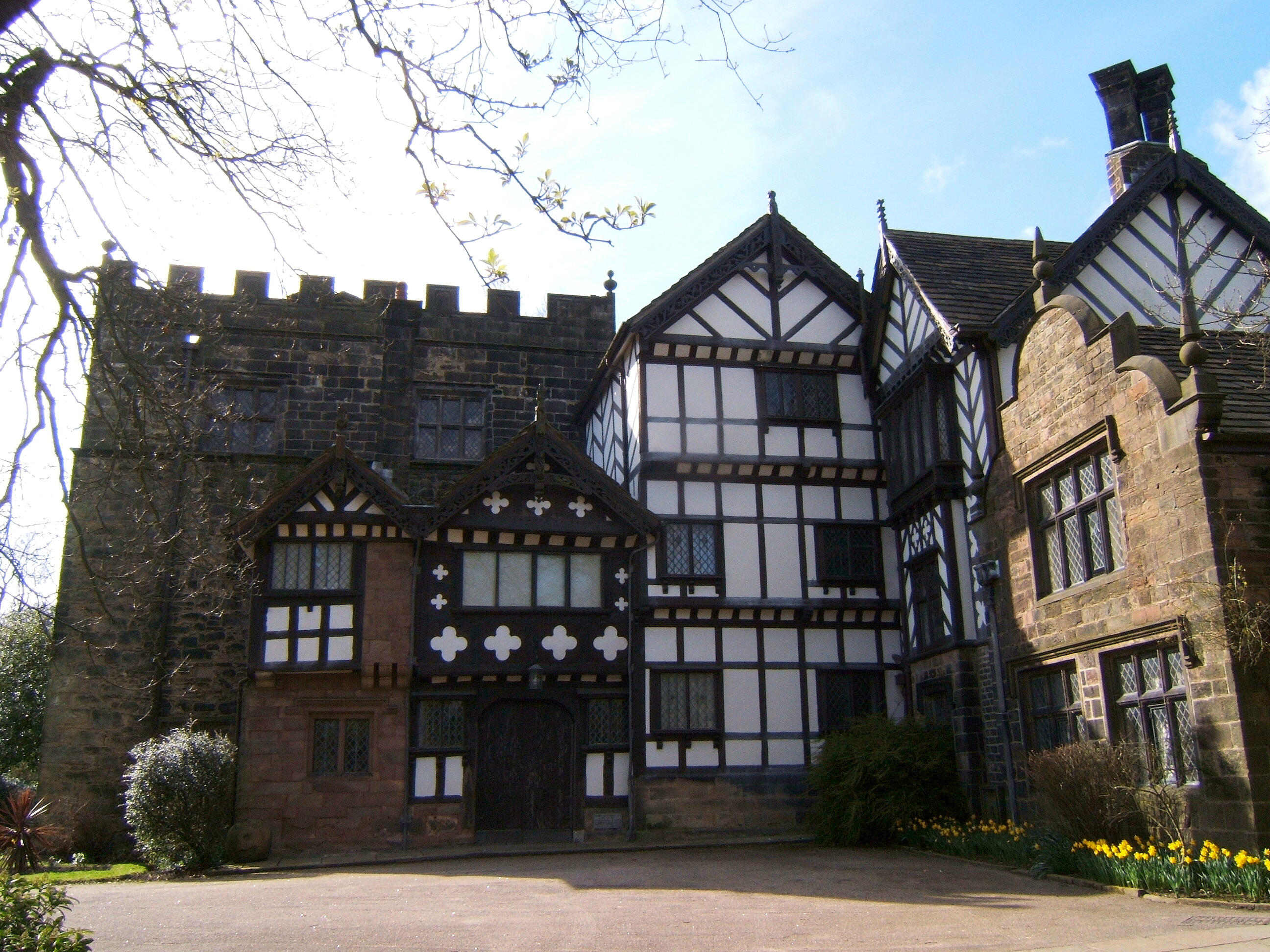
- Turton Tower
- Area
  - 1911: 17,335 acres (70.15 km^{2})
  - 1961: 17,334 acres (70.15 km^{2})
- Area transferred
  - 1898: Belmont, Bradshaw, Edgworth, Entwistle, Harwood, Longworth, and Quarlton from Bolton Rural District
- Population
  - 1891: 6,354
  - 1971: 21,553
- History
  - Created: 1873
  - Abolished: 1974
  - Succeeded by: North Turton, South Turton
- Status: Local board (1873–1895); Urban district (1895–1974)
  - HQ: Turton Tower

Turton Urban District was, from 1873 to 1974, a local government district centred on the historical area of Turton in the administrative county of Lancashire, England.

== History ==
=== Background ===
Turton was a township and chapelry of the civil and ecclesiastical parish of Bolton le Moors in the Salford Hundred of Lancashire. In 1837, Turton became part of the Bolton Poor Law Union which took responsibility for funding the Poor Law within that Union area. In 1866, Turton was given the status of a civil parish.

=== Formation ===
A resolution for the adoption of the Local Government Act 1858 was passed on 8 August 1872 by the owners and ratepayers of the township of Turton, and the following year a local board was formed to govern the area. After the Public Health Act 1875 was passed by Parliament in that year, Turton Local Board assumed extra duties as an urban sanitary district, although the local board's title did not change.

=== Change ===
In 1895, following the implementation of the Local Government Act 1894, Turton Local Board was reconstituted as an elected urban district council of twenty-one members. Four years later, under the Bolton Turton and Westhoughton Extension Act 1898 (61 & 62 Vict. c. ccxlii), Turton Urban District was greatly enlarged by the addition of the civil parishes of Belmont, Bradshaw, Harwood, Longworth, Entwistle, Edgworth and Quarlton from the former Bolton Rural District, which almost doubled the urban district's population. The urban district council had seven electoral wards: Chapeltown, Bromley Cross, Eagley, Egerton, Bradshaw, Edgworth, and Belmont wards, each represented by three councillors. Following the death of Sir Lees Knowles, 1st Baronet, in 1929, his widow, Lady Nina Knowles, presented Turton Tower to the urban district council in 1930, which became the council's seat of local government. Between 1961 and 1971, Bradshaw ward was divided into Bradshaw North and Bradshaw South.

=== Abolition ===
Under the Local Government Act 1972, Turton Urban District was abolished on 1 April 1974 and its former area was divided between two local authorities. The larger rural area, North Turton, became a civil parish of the Borough of Blackburn in Lancashire. The smaller urban area, South Turton, became an unparished area of the Metropolitan Borough of Bolton in Greater Manchester.

== Demography ==
Population changes of Turton, 1891–1971

Year	Population	±%
1891	6,354	—
1901	12,355	+94.4%
1911	12,648	+2.4%

Year	Population	±%
1921	12,154	−3.9%
1931	11,847	−2.5%
1939	12,173	+2.8%

Year	Population	±%
1951	10,956	−10.0%
1961	13,698	+25.0%
1971	21,553	+57.3%

Sources: Urban Sanitary District (USD) 1891. Urban District (UD) 1901–1971.

== Lists of office holders ==
=== Chairmen of Turton Local Board ===
Chairmen of Turton Local Board
Name	Party	Tenure	Notes
Edmund Ashworth	Liberal	1873–1880	
James Booth	—	1880–1882	
Edmund Ashworth, jnr	—	1882–1886	
Thomas Gustav Schwabe Garnett	Conservative	1886–1889	Afterwards became Chairman of Turton Urban District Council (1895–1900)
William Wallwork	—	1889–1892	
Robert Ashworth	Independent	1892–1895	Afterwards became Chairman of Turton Urban District Council (1908–1924)

=== Chairmen of Turton Urban District Council ===
Chairmen of Turton Urban District Council
Name	Party	Tenure	Notes
Thomas Gustav Schwabe Garnett	Conservative	1895–1900	Previously Chairman of Turton Local Board of Health (1886–1889)
Samuel Isherwood	—	1900–1901	
Thomas Hardcastle	—	1901–1902	
Edward Deakin	—	1902–1908	
Robert Ashworth	Independent	1908–1924	Previously Chairman of Turton Local Board of Health (1892–1895)
George Harry Ashworth	Independent	1924–1926	1st term
Ernest William Greg	—	1926–1927	
Thomas Lomax	Conservative	1928–1930	1st term
Sydney Herbert Spring	Independent	1930–1931	
Walter Harry Wadhams	Independent	1931–1934	
Jethro Haslam	—	1934	Died in office
James Platt	Independent	1934–1937	
Alfred Ruckman Hutchinson	Independent	1937–1938	
Robert Catterall	Conservative	1938–1939	1st term
John William Rostron	—	1939–1940	
George Harry Ashworth	Independent	1940–1941	2nd term
John Hamer	—	1941–1942	
Richard Shelmerdine	Liberal	1942–1943	
William Meredith	—	1943–1944	
George Harry Ashworth	Independent	1944–1945	3rd term
Thomas Lomax	Conservative	1945–1946	2nd term
Harold Kirk	—	1946–1947	1st term
Samuel Benson	Conservative	1947–1948	
William Knowles	—	1948–1949	1st term
West Scowcroft	Independent	1949–1950	
Robinson Walsh	—	1950–1951	
Francis William Stilwell	Conservative	1951–1952	
Robert Catterall	Conservative	1952–1953	2nd term
Arthur Shelmerdine	Independent	1953–1954	
Harold Kirk	—	1954–1955	2nd term
Robert Catterall	Conservative	1955–1956	3rd term
Andrew Thompson Jardine	Independent	1956–1957	
William Knowles	—	1957–1958	2nd term
Harold Kirk	—	1958–1959	3rd term
Hilbre Henry Smith	Independent	1959–1960	
Charles Halliday	Conservative	1960–1961	
Hilda Gregory	Conservative	1961–1962	
Herbert Bennett	Conservative	1962–1963	1st term
Michael Constantine Cort	Conservative	1963–1964	
Herbert Carlisle Walsh	Conservative	1964–1965	
David Dingwall	Labour	1965–1966	
John Alston	Independent	1966–1967	
Herbert Hutchinson	—	1967–1968	
Joseph Jagger	Liberal	1968–1969	
Philip Stefan Linney	Liberal	1969–1970	
Leonard Ibbotson	Conservative	1970–1971	
Keith Crook Richardson	Independent	1971–1972	
Arthur Poulsom	Conservative	1972–1973	
Herbert Bennett	Conservative	1973–1974	2nd term
