= Essa Academy =

Location
- Lever Edge Lane; Great Lever; Bolton, Greater Manchester, BL3 3HH; England
- 53.55613°N 2.44675°W

Information
- Type: Academy
- Local authority: Bolton Council
- Department for Education URN: 135770 Tables
- Ofsted: Reports
- Principal: M Flynn
- Student President: A Akhtar
- Gender: Coeducational
- Age: 11 to 16
- Website: https://esa.northerneducationtrust.org/

Essa Academy (formerly Hayward Grammar School) is a coeducational secondary school with academy status located in the Great Lever area of Bolton in the English county of Greater Manchester.

== History ==
Previously a community school administered by Bolton Metropolitan Borough Council, Hayward School converted to academy status in September 2009 and was renamed Essa Academy. However the school continues to coordinate with Bolton Metropolitan Borough Council for admissions.

The school moved to new buildings in 2011 which include sports facilities that are available to pupils and the local community. In September 2014 Essa Primary School opened in the grounds of the Essa Academy in separate buildings. New buildings were added in 2024.

Northern Education Trust took over in 2023 from EFA Trust.

== Notable former pupils ==
=== Hayward Grammar School ===
- Clive Myrie, BBC journalist and newsreader
