= Bolton Muslim Girls' School =

Location
- Swan Lane; Bolton, Greater Manchester, BL3 6TQ; England; 53.56746°N 2.4415°W

Information
- Type: Academy
- Religious affiliation: Islam
- Established: 1987
- Local authority: Bolton Council
- Trust: Prosper Multi-Academy Trust
- Department for Education URN: 142340 Tables
- Ofsted: Reports
- Headteacher: Idrish Patel
- Gender: Girls
- Age: 11 to 16
- Website: http://www.bmgs.prospermat.co.uk/

Bolton Muslim Girls' School is a secondary school located in Bolton in the English county of Greater Manchester.

It was founded in 1987 as a private Islamic school for girls by Bolton Muslim Welfare Trust. In 2007 it became a voluntary aided school and part of the state-funded sector administered by Bolton Metropolitan Borough Council. In September 2016 the school converted to academy status. The school is sponsored by the Prosper Multi-Academy Trust.

Bolton Muslim Girls' School offers GCSEs and BTECs as programmes of study for pupils.
