= Little Lever School =

Location
- Church Street; Little Lever; Greater Manchester, BL3 1BT; England; 53.5617°N 2.3843°W

Information
- Type: Academy
- Local authority: Bolton
- Department for Education URN: 142296 Tables
- Ofsted: Reports
- Headteacher: Dom McKeon
- Gender: Mixed
- Age: 11 to 16
- Website: https://www.little-lever.bolton.sch.uk/

Little Lever School is a mixed secondary school located in Little Lever in the English county of Greater Manchester.

Little Lever school was previously a community school with a specialism in Business and Enterprise that was administered by Bolton Metropolitan Borough Council. However Little Lever School converted to academy status in December 2015 and in a report by Ofsted in May 2026, the school met the expected standard in 5 out 6 areas, and met a strong expectation for the other. The school offers GCSEs, BTECs and ASDAN courses as programmes of study for pupils.

Little Lever School coordinates with Bolton Metropolitan Borough Council for admissions, and the main feeder primary schools are Bowness Primary School, Masefield Primary School, Mytham Primary School, St Matthew's CE Primary School, St Stephen's & All Martyrs CE Primary School and St Teresa's RC Primary School.

== Renovation and Extensions ==
Since around September 2024, Little Lever School has been undergoing a series of renovation and extensions, with new corridors, classrooms, and other facilities. With the plans for such being shown on The Bolton News.
