= BL postcode area =

Postcode area within the United Kingdom

Bolton
- Postcode area
- Coordinates: 53.587°N 2.408°W
- Country: United Kingdom
- Postcode area: BL
- Postcode area name: Bolton
- Post towns: 2
- Postcode districts: 10
- Postcode sectors: 53
- Postcodes (live): 10,285
- Postcodes (total): 13,912
- Statistics as at May 2020

The BL postcode area, also known as the Bolton postcode area, is a group of ten postcode districts in North West England. These cover most of the Metropolitan Borough of Bolton and the northern and central parts of the Metropolitan Borough of Bury in Greater Manchester, plus small parts of the boroughs of Chorley, Rossendale and Blackburn with Darwen in Lancashire.

Mail for the BL postcode area is processed at Manchester Mail Centre, along with mail for the M, OL and SK postcode areas.

== Coverage ==
The approximate coverage of the postcode districts:

Postcode district	Post town	Coverage	Local authority area(s)
BL0	BURY	Ramsbottom, Edenfield, Shuttleworth	Bury, Rossendale
BL1	BOLTON	Bolton centre, Smithills, Halliwell, Heaton Johnson Fold Astley Bridge Hall I’th Wood Doffcocker	Bolton
BL2	BOLTON	Bolton centre, Ainsworth, Bradley Fold, Bradshaw, Breightmet, Harwood, Tonge Fold, Tonge Moor	Bolton, Bury
BL3	BOLTON	Bolton centre, Little Lever, Great Lever, Darcy Lever, Ladybridge Morris Green Daubhill Deane	Bolton
BL4	BOLTON	Farnworth, Kearsley Moses Gate	Bolton
BL5	BOLTON	Over Hulton, Westhoughton	Bolton
BL6	BOLTON	Blackrod, Horwich, Lostock, Rivington	Bolton, Chorley
BL7	BOLTON	Belmont, Bromley Cross, Chapeltown, Edgworth, Egerton, Turton	Blackburn with Darwen, Bolton
BL8	BURY	Bury centre, Brandlesholme, Greenmount, Affetside, Hawkshaw, Holcombe, Ramsbottom, Tottington, Walshaw	Bury
BL9	BURY	Bury centre, Heap, Heap Bridge, Nangreaves, Summerseat, Unsworth, Walmersley, Bircle, Jericho	Bury

== Map ==
BL postcode area map, showing postcode districts in red and post towns in grey text, with links to nearby BB, M, OL, PR and WN postcode areas.

== See also ==
- List of postcode areas in the United Kingdom
- Postcode Address File
