= Bolton St Catherine's Academy =

Location
- Stitch-Mi-Lane; Breightmet; Bolton, Greater Manchester, BL2 4HU; England
- 53.59429°N 2.38887°W

Information
- Type: Academy
- Religious affiliation: Church of England
- Established: 2009
- Founder: The Bishop Fraser Trust and Manchester Diocese
- Local authority: Bolton Council
- Department for Education URN: 145314 Tables
- Ofsted: Reports
- Chair of Governors: Jason Hyde
- Headteacher: Ryan Mallett
- Gender: Mixed
- Age: 3 to 19
- Enrolment: 1,260
- Capacity: 1,400
- Website: www.boltonstcatherinesacademy.org.uk

Bolton St Catherine's Academy is a mixed Church of England all-through school. The school is located in the Breightmet area of Bolton in the English county of Greater Manchester.

The school was formed in September 2009 from the merger of Withins School and Top o'th' Brow Primary School, both community schools administered by Bolton Metropolitan Borough Council. Bolton St Catherine's Academy became part of The Bishop Fraser Trust in May 2018 alongside Canon Slade School and St James's CofE High School. It coordinates with Bolton Council for admissions. The school offers Nursery, primary - double class entry per year, secondary - 160 per year, education for pupils aged 3 to 16.

In 2012 Bolton St Catherine's Academy relocated from the two former school sites to a new campus on Stitch-Mi-Lane. The new campus also houses Firwood Special School, a community special school for pupils aged 11 – 16.
