= Turton School =

Location
- Bromley Cross Road; Bromley Cross, Greater Manchester, BL7 9LT; England; 53.614006°N 2.412712°W

Information
- Type: Community school
- Motto: Building on the knowledge of the past to help the children of today meet the challenges of tomorrow
- Established: 1954
- Local authority: Bolton
- Department for Education URN: 105253 Tables
- Ofsted: Reports
- Headteacher: S Gorse
- Gender: Mixed
- Age: 11 to 18
- Enrolment: 1,695 pupils
- Colours: Blue (Year 7), Red (Year 8), Silver (Year 9), Green (Year 10), Purple (Year 11) and Black (prefects)
- Website: http://www.turton.uk.com/

Turton School is a mixed comprehensive secondary school and sixth form in Bromley Cross, in the Metropolitan Borough of Bolton, Greater Manchester, England.

== History and information ==
Main School Building

Construction for the main school buildings started in 1939, but were postponed due to the Second World War. The school eventually opened in April 1954. The school buildings were extensively renovated in 2018 which included a new dining room, library, learning support area and English department. It is over-subscribed, with two applications per place. Facilities include a community swimming pool and sports hall. The school enjoys sporting success in hockey, netball, football, rugby, basketball, tennis, cricket, rounders, badminton, table tennis, volleyball, and softball, and also offers dance, gymnastics, swimming, and aerobics.

There are junior and senior choirs, a training orchestra and senior orchestra, wind band, flute choir, brass band, string quartet and wind quartet. Other extra-curricular activities range from chess, technology and computers to drama and writing groups that produce a school magazine and newsletter. Turton High also offers an industrial awareness conference, Young Enterprise, sixth-form debating and a variety of charity events.

== Admissions ==
Re-organised as a comprehensive in 1971, the school is situated in the northern extremity of Bolton in a suburban commuter area.

== Sixth form ==
Turton Sixth Form Entrance

The Sixth Form at Turton offers over 35 Advanced Level courses in a purpose-built centre with Common Room, ICT facilities and Study Area, an all-day snack bar, conference room, green screen television studio and media suite.

Over half of these have not previously attended the main school.

== Awards and achievements ==
- Awarded Healthy School status in March 2007
- The latest Ofsted report states:
  "Standards are well above average and rising, as a result of good teaching and teachers' effective use of data to set targets"
- Teachernet school achievement award winner
- FA charter standard school

== Senior staff ==
- Headteacher: S. Gorse
- Deputy headteachers: C. Bach, C. Baily
- Director of sixth form: K. Bali
- Assistant headteachers: J L Edge, A Lane, N R Parry
- Associate assistant headteachers: J Bach - also SENCO

== Notable alumni ==
- Harry Brockbank (born 1998), English footballer, former player for Bolton Wanderers, now playing for St Patrick’s Athletic FC
- James Carlton (aka James Slark; born 1977), actor, Emmerdale and Heartbeat
- Justin Chadwick (born 1968), producer of The Other Boleyn Girl and Long Walk to Freedom.
- Gabriel Clark (born 1998), actor, writer and director, best known for Hollyoaks and Tip Toe.
- John Cunliffe (born 1984), former professional footballer in the United States.
- David Flitcroft (born 1974), footballer, now director of football at Port Vale
- Garry Flitcroft (born 1972), footballer, Blackburn Rovers and Manchester City
- Jack Harrison (born 1996), footballer playing for Leeds United, Everton
- Paul Heathcote (born 1960), chef
- Chris Hunt (born 1968), badminton gold medalist, European and Commonwealth
- Andy Kellett (born 1993), footballer Bolton, Plymouth, Wigan, Bury
- Tom Lancashire (born 1985), middle-distance athlete 2008 Olympian
- David Andrew Phoenix (born 1966), biochemist and educationalist
- Craig Pilling (born 1986), wrestling Commonwealth Games 2014 bronze medallist
- Clare Pollard (born 1978), poet and playwright
- Paul Sixsmith (born 1971), international footballer for Malta
- Stuart Stokes (born 1976), athlete, 2012 Olympian 3000m steeplechase
- Simon Whaley (born 7 June 1985), former footballer playing for Bury, Preston North End, Barnsley, Norwich City, Rochdale and Bradford City.
- Sammy Winward (born 1985), actress, Emmerdale.
