= Bradshaw, Greater Manchester =

Village in Greater Manchester, England

Coordinates: 53.608°N 2.399°W

Bradshaw
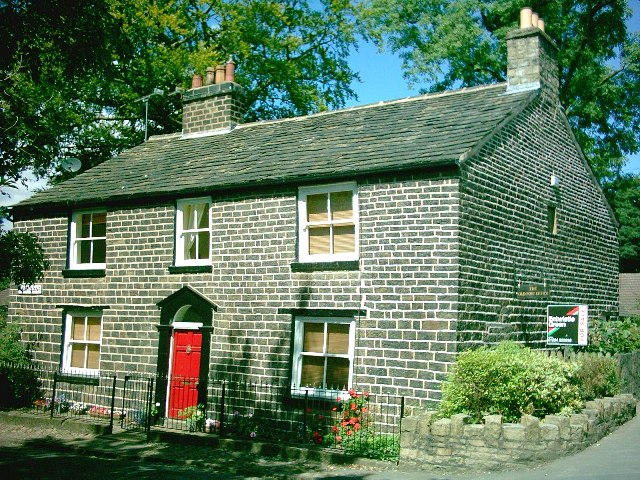

- Location within Greater Manchester
- OS grid reference: SD735125
- Metropolitan borough: Bolton
- Metropolitan county: Greater Manchester
- Region: North West
- Country: England
- Sovereign state: United Kingdom
- Post town: BOLTON
- Postcode district: BL2
- Dialling code: 01204
- Police: Greater Manchester
- Fire: Greater Manchester
- Ambulance: North West
- UK Parliament: Bolton North East

Bradshaw is a village of the unparished area of South Turton in the Metropolitan Borough of Bolton in Greater Manchester, England. It gives its name to the larger Bradshaw electoral ward, which includes Harwood. within the Historic County of Lancashire, Bradshaw lies on the southern edge of the West Pennine Moors.

== History ==
=== Toponymy ===
The toponymy of Bradshaw is derived from the Old English adjective Brad from which our modern word broad is evolved, and the Old English word sceaga – anglicised to shaw – a copse. The two elements together mean a broad copse. In early deeds and documents of the 13th Century the name is spelt Bradeshaye and later Bradshaigh.

=== The Manor of Bradshaw ===
Henry Bradshaw held land in the area in 1235, and the Bradshaws were an important Lancashire family in the late 1500s and early 1600s, especially during the movement against the King before the Civil War. John Bradshaw died in 1542 holding the Manor of Bradshaw. In 1694 the Lordship of the Manor of Bradshaw was sold by another John Bradshaw to Henry Bradshaw of Marple Hall. The estate later descended to the Isherwood family.

== Governance ==
Lying within the historic county boundaries of Lancashire, Bradshaw was from the 12th Century until 1974 a township and chapelry of the ancient parish of Bolton-le-Moors in the Salford Hundred.

In 1837, Bradshaw joined with other townships and civil parishes in the area to form the Bolton Poor Law Union and took joint responsibility for the administration and funding of the Poor Law and building a workhouse. In 1866, Bradshaw was given the status of a civil parish in its own right.

In 1894, Bradshaw became part of the Bolton Rural District which took responsibility over matters such as planning, council housing, and playgrounds and cemeteries. The Rural District was dissolved in 1898 and its civil parishes were incorporated into various local authorities. As a result, on 30 September 1898 Bradshaw parish was abolished and merged with Turton and became part of the Turton Urban District. In 1891 the parish had a population of 647.

Under the Local Government Act 1972, Turton Urban District was abolished on 1 April 1974 and was divided between two local authorities. The northern part, North Turton, became part of the borough of Blackburn (which changed to Blackburn with Darwen in 1997) in Lancashire, and the southern part, South Turton (including Bradshaw), became part of the Metropolitan Borough of Bolton in Greater Manchester.

== Landmarks ==
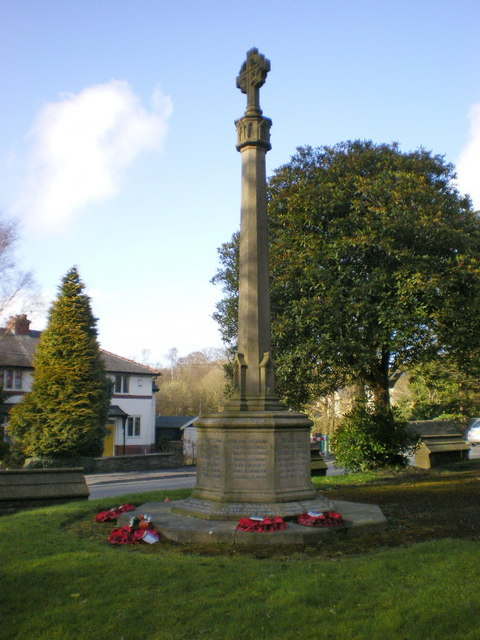
Bradshaw War Memorial

Bradshaw War Memorial is located within the grounds of St Maxentius' Churchyard. It commemorates the residents of Bradshaw who were killed in the First and Second World Wars.

The inscription on one of the panels of the memorial reads:

To The Glory Of God And In Memory Of The Men Of Bradshaw Who Died For Their Country In The Great War 1914–1918.

On the base there is a further inscription for the Second World War:

Also In Loving Remembrance Of The Men Of This Parish Who Gave Their Lives In The War Of 1939–1945.

Other panels and the base has the names of all those killed in the two world wars. The churchyard also contains seven war graves, six from the First World War and one from the Second World War.

== Education ==
Bradshaw has two schools: St Maxentius C.of E. Primary School, New Heys Way, and Canon Slade School, Bradshaw Brow.

== Religious sites ==
Bradshaw is famous for its "tower without a church and a church without a tower". This refers to St. Maxentius's Church in Bradshaw. This church was originally one of the earliest chapels of ease for Bolton Parish Church. The 16th-century tower is all that is left of the original chapel of ease. The present 1872 church building is near, but separate from the tower.

== See also ==
- Listed buildings in South Turton
