= Metropolitan Borough of Bolton =

Borough of Greater Manchester, England

- Metropolitan borough
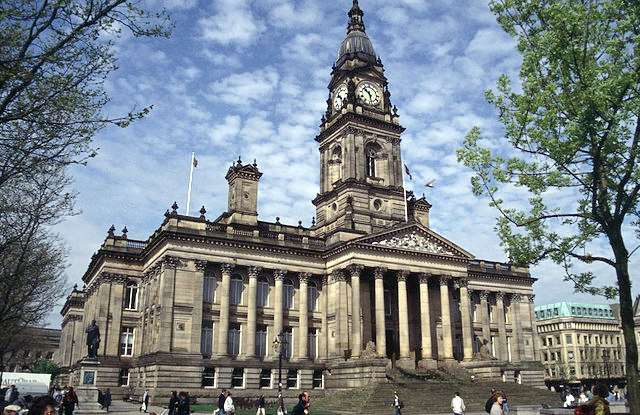
- Bolton Town Hall, the seat of Bolton Council

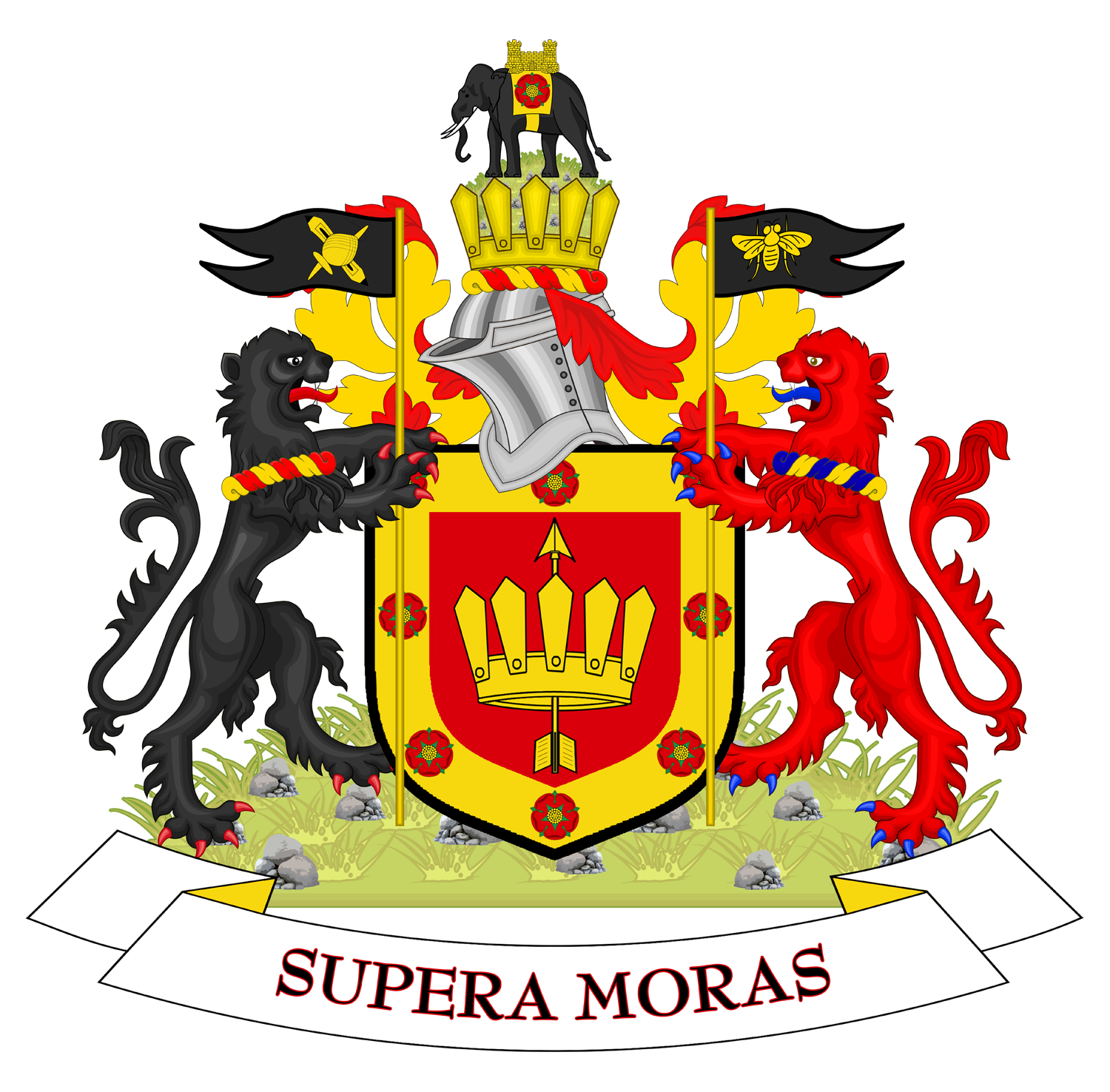
- Coat of arms
- Motto: Latin: Supera Moras, lit. 'overcome delays'
- Bolton shown within Greater Manchester
- Coordinates: 53°34′39″N 2°25′48″W
- Sovereign state: United Kingdom
- Country: England
- Region: North West
- Ceremonial county and city region: Greater Manchester
- Borough status: 1253
- Incorporated: 1 April 1974
- Named for: Bolton
- Administrative HQ: Bolton Town Hall

Government
  - Type: Metropolitan borough
  - Body: Bolton Council
  - Executive: Leader and cabinet
  - Control: No overall control
  - Leader: Nick Peel (L)
  - Mayor of Bolton: David Chadwick
  - MPs: 3 MPs: Phil Brickell (L); Kirith Entwistle (L); Yasmin Qureshi (L)

Area
  - Total: 140 km^{2} (54 sq mi)
  - Rank: 170th

Population (2025)
  - Total: 309,732
  - Rank: 48th
  - Density: 2,216/km^{2} (5,740/sq mi)

Ethnicity (2021)
  - Ethnic groups: List: 71.9% White; 20.1% Asian; 3.8% Black; 2.2% Mixed; 1.9% other

Religion (2021)
  - Religion: List: 47.0% Christianity; 25.8% no religion; 19.9% Islam; 2.0% Hinduism; 0.2% Buddhism; 0.1% Sikhism; 0.1% Judaism; 0.3% other; 4.6% not stated
- Time zone: UTC+0 (GMT)
  - Summer (DST): UTC+1 (BST)
- Postcode area: BL1–7; M26; M46
- Dialling code: 01204; 0161; 01942
- ISO 3166 code: GB-BOL
- GSS code: E08000001
- Website: bolton.gov.uk

The Metropolitan Borough of Bolton (/ˈboʊltən/ BOHL-tən) is a metropolitan borough in Greater Manchester, England, named after its largest town, Bolton, but covering a larger area which includes Blackrod, Farnworth, Horwich, Kearsley, Westhoughton, and part of the West Pennine Moors. It had a population of 309,732 in 2025, making it the third-most populous district in Greater Manchester.

What is now the borough was created in 1974 under the Local Government Act 1972; the area was formerly part of Lancashire. It was formed from seven urban districts from the administrative county of Lancashire, the southern part of an eighth urban district, and the county borough of Bolton. The metropolitan districts of Bury, Salford and Wigan lie to the east, south and west respectively; and the unitary authority of Blackburn with Darwen and the non-metropolitan district of Chorley in Lancashire to the north and north-west.

== History ==
Bolton Metropolitan Borough was formed on 1 April 1974 under the Local Government Act 1972, covering the combined areas of seven former local government districts and part of an eighth, which were all abolished at the same time:

- Blackrod Urban District
- Bolton County Borough
- Farnworth Municipal Borough
- Horwich Urban District
- Kearsley Urban District
- Little Lever Urban District
- Turton Urban District (southern part; remainder became parish of North Turton in Blackburn district.)
- Westhoughton Urban District

As a county borough, the old borough of Bolton had been administratively independent from any county council, but was deemed part of Lancashire for ceremonial purposes. The other seven districts had all been part of the administrative county of Lancashire prior to 1974, with Lancashire County Council serving as their upper tier authority. When the metropolitan borough of Bolton was created in 1974 it was transferred to the new metropolitan county of Greater Manchester, with Greater Manchester Council providing county-level services. The Greater Manchester Council was abolished in 1986, after which Bolton became a unitary authority, providing all local government services.

Bolton Council unsuccessfully petitioned Elizabeth II for the Metropolitan Borough of Bolton to be granted city status in 1992 (the Queen's 40th year as monarch), in 2000 (for the Millennium celebrations), in 2002 (Queen's Golden Jubilee), and 2012 (Queen's Diamond Jubilee).

== Parishes ==
Horwich, Westhoughton and Blackrod are now constituted as civil parishes, each having a town council: Westhoughton Town Council, Horwich Town Council and Blackrod Town Council. The rest of the metropolitan borough, covering the town of Bolton itself, Farnworth, Kearsley, Little Lever, and South Turton, have remained unparished areas since 1974.

== Demographics ==
=== Population change ===
The table below details the population change since 1801, including the percentage change since the last available census data. Although the Metropolitan Borough of Bolton has only existed since 1974, figures have been generated by combining data from the towns, villages, and civil parishes that would later be constituent parts of the borough.

Population growth in Bolton since 1801

Year	Population	±%
1801	37,417	—
1811	48,996	+30.9%
1821	60,319	+23.1%
1831	75,787	+25.6%
1841	89,507	+18.1%
1851	105,957	+18.4%
1861	132,437	+25.0%

Year	Population	±%
1871	158,917	+20.0%
1881	185,397	+16.7%
1891	216,792	+16.9%
1901	240,014	+10.7%
1911	265,733	+10.7%
1921	263,413	−0.9%
1931	261,119	−0.9%

Year	Population	±%
1941	256,207	−1.9%
1951	251,388	−1.9%
1961	255,627	+1.7%
1971	259,993	+1.7%
1981	260,229	+0.1%
1991	262,880	+1.0%
2001	261,035	−0.7%

Pre-1974 statistics were gathered from local government areas that now comprise the Metropolitan Borough of Bolton
Source: Vision of Britain

=== Ethnicity ===
According to the 2021 census, of the 295,963 people living in Bolton Metropolitan Borough, the following list shows the population of Bolton by ethnicity:

Ethnic Group	Year					
Ethnic Group	2001 census		2011 census		2021 census	
Ethnic Group	Number	%	Number	%	Number	%
White: Total	232,366	89%	226,645	81.9%	212,941	72%
White: British	227,635	87.2%	219,794	79.4%	203,486	68.8%
White: Irish	2,253		1,694		1,430	0.5%
White: Roma			214		519	0.2%
White: Gypsy or Irish Traveller					373	0.1%
White: Other	2,478		4,943		7,133	2.4%
Asian or Asian British: Total	24,141	9.2%	38,749	14%	59,596	20.1%
Asian or Asian British: Indian	15,884		21,665		26,238	8.9%
Asian or Asian British: Pakistani	6,487		12,026		27,897	9.4%
Asian or Asian British: Bangladeshi	268		614		985	0.3%
Asian or Asian British: Chinese	497		1,423		1,123	0.4%
Asian or Asian British: Other Asian	1,005		3,021		3,353	1.1%
Black or Black British: Total	1,607		4,652		11,238	3.8%
Black or Black British: African	689		3,451		9,299	3.1%
Black or Black British: Caribbean	823		608		603	0.2%
Other Black	95		593		1,336	0.5%
Mixed or British Mixed: Total	2,542		4,892		6,643	2.2%
Mixed: White and Black Caribbean	859		1,576		1,737	0.6%
Mixed: White and Black African	296		678		1,242	0.4%
Mixed: White and Asian	970		1,826		2,338	0.8%
Mixed: Other Mixed	417		812		1,326	0.4%
Other: Total	381		1,848		5,542	1.9%
Other: Arab			727		1,812	0.6%
Other: Any other ethnic group			1,121		3,730	1.3%
Non-White: Total	28,671	11%	50,141	18.1%	83,019	28%
Total	261,037	100%	276,786	100%	295,960	100%

=== Religion ===
The following table shows the religious identity of people residing in Bolton at the 2021 census.

Religion	2021	
Religion	Number	%
Christian	139,144	47.0
Muslim	58,997	19.9
Jewish	159	0.1
Hindu	5,887	2.0
Sikh	219	0.1
Buddhism	576	0.2
Other religion	979	0.3
No religion	76,244	25.8
Religion not stated	13,758	4.6
Total	295,963	100.0

== Transport ==
The Bolton metropolitan area is served by the following railway stations:

- Bolton Interchange
- Bromley Cross
- Hall i' th' Wood
- Blackrod
- Horwich Parkway (for Toughsheet Community Stadium)
- Lostock
- Westhoughton
- Moses Gate
- Farnworth
- Kearsley
- Daisy Hill

== Media ==
In terms of television, the area is served by BBC North West and ITV Granada with television signals received from the Winter Hill TV transmitter near Belmont.

Radio stations for the area include BBC Radio Manchester, Heart North West, Smooth North West, Capital Manchester and Lancashire, Greatest Hits Radio Bolton & Bury, and community radio station 96.5 Bolton FM.

Local newspapers are The Bolton News, Horwich Advertiser (serving Horwich), and Manchester Evening News.

== Education ==
In 2007, Bolton was ranked 69th out of the 149 Local Education Authorities – and sixth out of ten in Greater Manchester – for its National Curriculum assessment performance. Measured on the percentage of pupils attaining at least 5 A*–C grades at GCSE including maths and English, the Bolton LEA was 111th out of 149: 40.1% of pupils achieved this objective, against a national average of 46.7%. Unauthorised absence from Bolton's secondary schools in the 2006/2007 academic year was 1.4%, in line with the national average, and authorised absence was 6.0% against the national average of 6.4%. At GCSE level, Bolton School (Girls' Division) was the most successful of Bolton's 21 secondary schools, with 99% of pupils achieving at least 5 A*–C grades at including maths and English.

The University of Bolton is one of Greater Manchester's four universities. In 2008, The Times Good University Guide ranked it 111th of 113 institutions in Britain. There are 4,440 students (83% undergraduate, 17% postgraduate); 2.6% come from outside Britain. In 2007 there were 8.8 applications for every place, and student satisfaction was recorded as 74.4%. It is one of Britain's newest universities, having been given this status in 2005.

=== GCSE Examination Performance 2009 ===
Metropolitan Borough of Bolton GCSE performances
School	A*-C Pass Rate	Point Score
Bolton Muslim Girls' School	100%	533.1
Bolton School (Girls' Division)	98%	546.7
Canon Slade C of E School	93%	508.5
Lord's Independent School	93%	401.5
St Joseph's RC High School	85%	426.6
Madrasatul Imam Muhammed Zakariya	79%	347.3
Al Jamiah Al Islamiyyah at Mount St Joseph's Convent	79%	327.9
Ladybridge High School	78%	437.6
Turton School	76%	396.1
Sharples School	74%	414.1
Westhoughton High School	67%	424.0
Rivington and Blackrod High School	69%	456.7
Essa Academy	67%	383.7
Smithills School	66%	400.8
Little Lever School	61%	442.7
Mount St Joseph School	61%	422.7
Harper Green School	59%	384.7
George Tomlinson School	55%	307.4
Bolton School (Boys' Division)	52%	240.4
Average for Metropolitan Borough of Bolton	71.4%	422.5
Average for England	70.0%	413.5

- Schools highlighted in yellow are above the LEA average; those highlighted in orange are below the average.
- Another secondary school, Bolton Muslim Girls' School, has opened since January 2007; no results are available.
- Source: Department for Children, Schools and Families

== Governance ==
The local authority is Bolton Metropolitan Borough Council, which styles itself "Bolton Council". Since 2011 it has been a constituent member of the Greater Manchester Combined Authority, providing strategic co-ordination of local government across the ten metropolitan boroughs of Greater Manchester. Since 2017 the combined authority has been led by the directly-elected Mayor of Greater Manchester.

== Twin towns ==
The Metropolitan Borough of Bolton has two twin towns, one in France and another in Germany.

Place	Country	County / District / Region / State	Originally twinned with	Date
Le Mans	France	Pays de la Loire	County Borough of Bolton	1973
Paderborn	Germany	Nordrhein-Westfalen	Metropolitan Borough of Bolton	1975

== Neighbouring districts ==
The local government districts which surround the Metropolitan Borough of Bolton
North-West: Borough of Chorley	North: Borough of Blackburn with Darwen	North-East and East: Metropolitan Borough of Bury
North-West: Borough of Chorley	Metropolitan Borough of Bolton	North-East and East: Metropolitan Borough of Bury
South-West: Metropolitan Borough of Wigan		South-East: City of Salford

== Freedom of the Borough ==
The following people and military units have received the Freedom of the Borough.

=== Individuals ===
- William Lever, 1st Viscount Leverhulme: 10 November 1902.
- John Pennington Thomasson: 10 November 1902.
- Andrew Carnegie: 29 September 1910.
- Field Marshall Lord Montgomery : 5 November 1949.
- Nat Lofthouse: 2 December 1989.
- Robert Howarth: 16 June 2001.
- Sir Jason Kenny: 16 March 2022.

=== Military units ===
- 253rd Regiment Royal Artillery (TA): 18 April 1964.
- 5th Battalion Loyal Regiment (North Lancashire) (TA): 18 April 1964.
- HMS Dido, RN: 14 April 1973.
- 216 (The Bolton Artillery) Battery 103rd (Lancashire Artillery Volunteers) Regiment Royal Artillery: 18 May 1994.
- 1st Battalion The Duke of Lancaster's Regiment: 14 March 2009.

== See also ==
- Bolton local elections
- List of Mayors of Bolton
- List of people from Bolton
