= Turton, Lancashire =

Historic area of North West England

Coordinates: 53°38′N 2°24′W

Turton
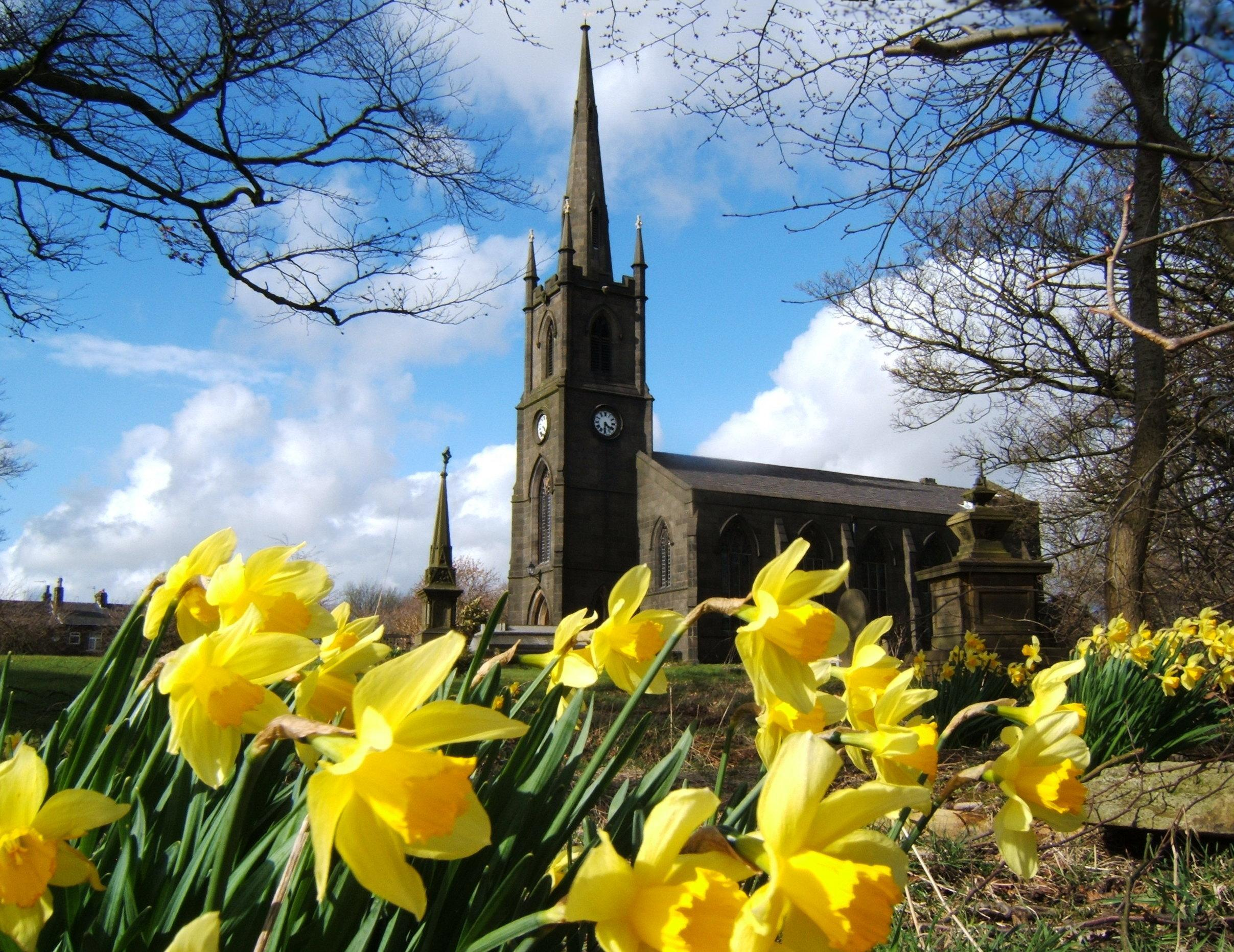
- St Anne's Church

- Location within Lancashire
- Metropolitan borough: Bolton
- Unitary authority: Blackburn with Darwen
- Metropolitan county: Greater Manchester
- Ceremonial county: Lancashire
- Region: North West
- Country: England
- Sovereign state: United Kingdom

Turton is a historical area in the North West of England. It is part of the ceremonial counties of Lancashire and Greater Manchester. The Turton area is located north of Bolton and south of Blackburn. The area historically formed a township in the ancient parish of Bolton le Moors. The principal village in the township is now known as Chapeltown.

The area of the former township is now divided between two districts. North Turton is part of the borough of Blackburn with Darwen, and South Turton is part of the metropolitan borough of Bolton. Although no longer used as an administrative area, the name of Turton is still used as a historical area.

== Toponymy ==
Turton means "Thor/Þor's village", from the Old Norse personal name Thor/Þor and Old English tun "farm, village". It was recorded as Thirtun in 1185 and variously recorded as Turton in 1212, Thurton in 1277 and Terton alias Torton in 1282.

The Scandinavian etymology would seem to fit, considering that there are other place-names in the area of this origin.

== History ==
=== Early history ===
Between Chapeltown and Egerton are the remains of prehistoric stone circles on moorland at Cheetham Close which date back to the Bronze Age. These stone circles are the earliest evidence for settlers in the Turton area. One of the circles was 15 metres (51 ft) in diameter and some of the stones were several feet in height. In the 19th century there were many uninvited visitors to the site which caused the local farmer, a tenant of Turton Tower, to break it up in 1871 using his team of carthorses and sledge hammers. Before this happened, antiquarian, Gilbert French, had made sketches, maps and plans and written a detailed description which is now in Bolton Reference Library.

To the south are the remains of another circle, slightly larger in circumference, which is thought to have been a livestock enclosure.

=== Turton Tower ===
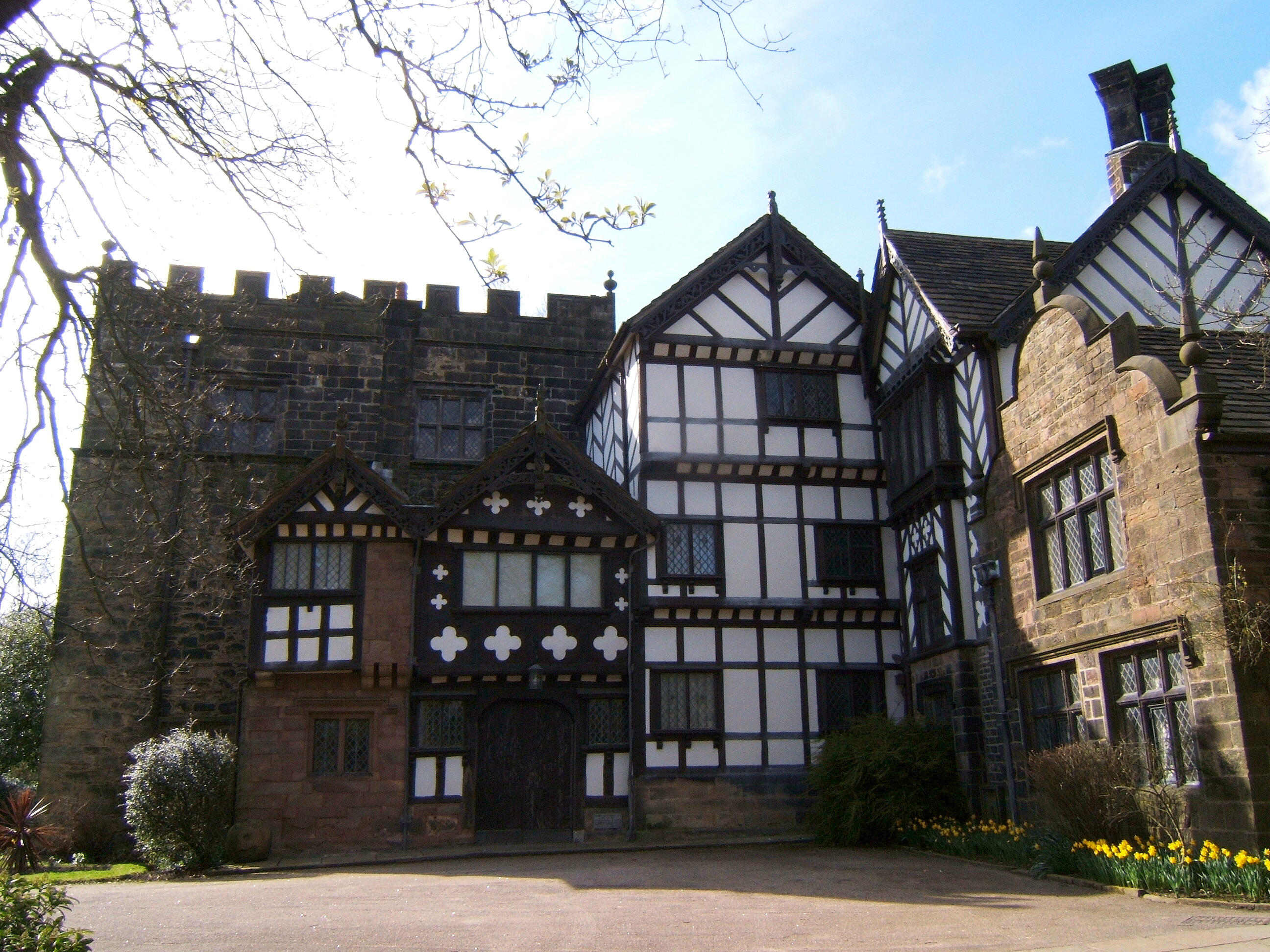
Turton Tower

Turton Tower in Chapeltown was home to the Lords of the Manor of Turton and dates to the 12th century. The earliest reference to the Manor of Turton is found around 1200 when it was part of the barony of Manchester by which time part of the manor was in the hands of the de Lathom family (sometimes called "de Torbac").

Turton Tower was inherited in 1420 by the Orrell family. The pele tower was rebuilt in 1420 and around 1596 the height was increased and the floors raised, creating the three spacious rooms. In the sixteenth and seventeenth centuries the timbered farmhouse buildings on the east and north of the Tower and the Entrance Hall were added. In 1628 the Orrells sold Turton Tower to Humphrey Chetham, the Manchester merchant responsible for the creation of Chetham's Library and Chetham's School of Music. The Tower passed to his descendants, the Bland, Green and Frere families who leased it to a succession of tenant farmers.

The tower was sold in 1835 to James Kay (1774–1857), who had harnessed steam power and developed the first commercially successful wet-spinning process for flax in 1825. Kay restored the tower and few rooms in the main part of the Tower escaped his attention, but his valuable work was marred by his inability to resist the temptation to 'restore' what has never been there in the first place. James Kay sold the tower to Elizabeth and Anne Appleton who leased the tower to William Rigg, a calico manufacturer, whose daughter, Ellen, wrote her memories of Turton now published as "Victorian Children at Turton Tower".

In October 1903 the tower was bought by Sir Lees Knowles, 1st Baronet MP for Salford West for £3,875. He made his fortune from his family's collieries on the Manchester Coalfield. After his death in 1929, his widow, Lady Nina Knowles, presented Turton Tower to Turton Urban District Council in 1930, and it became the council chamber.

After local government re-organisation in 1974, Turton was split and the tower became part of the new borough of Blackburn, and was administered by Lancashire County Museums Service. Following changes to the Lancashire County Museum Service, the tower was taken over by Blackburn with Darwen Council.

The Summerhouse east of Turton Tower, a grade II* listed building, is on the heritage at risk register.

=== Industry ===
Cotton mills, printworks, bleachworks, an iron foundry, and a paper mill were important industries in Turton after the Industrial Revolution. The Black Rock Mill complex, a site owned by Whitecroft Limited (previously the Bleachers' Association Limited), was last operated in the 1950s as a bleach and print works. Horrobin Mill Bleachworks, one of the oldest bleachworks in the Bolton area, ceased trading in 1937 after 150 years activity.

== Governance ==
Until the 19th century Turton was a township and chapelry in the ancient ecclesiastical parish of Bolton le Moors in the Salford hundred of Lancashire.

In 1837 Turton joined with other townships in the area to form the Bolton Poor Law Union and took joint responsibility for the administration and funding of the Poor Law in that area. There was a workhouse at Goose Cote Farm in Turton. In 1873 a Local board of health was established for the Turton township area.

In 1866 the township became a civil parish. In 1894 Turton became part of Turton Urban District, and the urban district was greatly enlarged in 1898 by the addition of several more parishes. The parish urban district were abolished on 1 April 1974, and its former area was divided between two districts. North Turton is part of the borough of Blackburn with Darwen, and South Turton is part of the metropolitan borough of Bolton.

== Geography ==
The Turton township covered an area of 4,614 acres (18.67 km^{2}) and extended in a north and north-west direction for nearly 5 miles (8 km). The central part of the township is occupied by high moorland, Turton Heights at 1,100 feet (335 m) and Turton Moor at 1,280 feet (390 m). The Bradshaw Brook which formed the northern and eastern boundaries, was dammed to form two reservoirs for the Bolton Waterworks.

The main road from Bolton divided at the southern end of the township to pass each side of the central hill, the eastern branch through Turton village to Edgworth and Darwen, and the western branch through Egerton, over Charters Moss at 916 feet (279 m) to Blackburn.

== Demography ==
Population changes for the chapelry/civil parish of Turton

Year	Population	±%
1801	1,369	—
1811	1,782	+30.2%
1821	2,090	+17.3%
1831	2,563	+22.6%

Year	Population	±%
1841	3,577	+39.6%
1851	4,158	+16.2%
1861	4,513	+8.5%
1871	4,942	+9.5%

Year	Population	±%
1881	5,653	+14.4%
1891	6,354	+12.4%

Source(s): (a) Local population statistics. (b) Turton Ch/CP: Total Population. (c) Four Bolton Directories. In 1961 the parish had a population of 13,698.

== Religion ==
Turton had two Anglican chapels of ease in the ancient ecclesiastical parish of Bolton le Moors, in the hundred of Salford, Lancashire.

The first chapel of ease at Chapeltown was built in 1111 and dedicated to St. Bartholomew, a derivative of St Botolph, but was rededicated in the early 18th century to St Anne. This building, which was known as the Chapel of Turton, was rebuilt in 1630 by Humphrey Chetham and again in 1779. The present Parish Church of St Anne was built between 1840 and 1841, the architect was probably John Palmer. The ecclesiastical parish was formed in 1837.

The second chapel of ease was at Walmsley, which was the old village name for Egerton. It is not known when Walmsley Chapel was built, but the Diocesan Church Calendar stated that it existed in the year 1500 and the first documentary evidence appears to be in the "Inventories of Church Goods 1552". The chapel was rebuilt in 1771 and demolished in 1839. The present Christ Church, Walmsley, Egerton, was consecrated in 1840.

A mission church at Toppings opened in 1897, and services were held in the school at Eagley Bridge. The Wesleyan Methodists had chapels at Turton, Egerton, and Toppings and there were Congregational chapels at Turton and Egerton where the old Nonconformist chapel of 1713 became Unitarian. The Roman Catholic church of St. Aldhelm at Turton was opened in 1903.

== Sport ==
Turton Football Club is one of the oldest clubs, if not the oldest, in Britain. The club was founded in December 1871 by men from Chapeltown in Turton. The club plays at Thomasson Fold in Edgworth. Its old ground at Chapeltown, which is still used by the Old Boltonians team, is believed to be the oldest football pitch in the world in use today.
