= Listed buildings in North Turton =

North Turton is a civil parish in Blackburn with Darwen, Lancashire, England. Included in the parish are the settlements of Edgworth, Chapeltown, Belmont, Entwistle, Quarlton, Round Barn, Turton Bottoms, and Whittlestone Head. The parish contains 66 buildings that are recorded in the National Heritage List for England as designated listed buildings. Of these, one is listed at Grade I, the highest of the three grades, five at Grade II*, the middle grade, and the others are at Grade II, the lowest grade.

Apart from the settlements, the parish is entirely rural, and a high proportion of the listed buildings are farm buildings dating from between the 16th and the 19th century. The other listed buildings include Turton Tower, initially a tower house and later a museum, other manor houses and country houses, structures associated with these houses, churches, a bridge over Bradshaw Brook, and a public house. The Blackburn, Darwen and Bolton Railway (later part of the Lancashire and Yorkshire Railway) was built through the parish and, associated with this, are a viaduct crossing the valley of Bradshaw Brook, and two ornamental bridges. Reservoirs were constructed in the parish and the associated listed buildings are a cottage, a plaque, and a monument. The other listed buildings are two telephone kiosks, a guidepost, village stocks, and a market cross.

== Key ==
Grade	Criteria
I	Buildings of exceptional interest, sometimes considered to be internationally important
II*	Particularly important buildings of more than special interest
II	Buildings of national importance and special interest

== Buildings ==
Name and location	Photograph	Date	Notes	Grade
Turton Tower; 53.63281°N 2.40896°W		Medieval	A manor house that originated as a tower house, its pele tower was raised from two to three storeys in about 1596 when the house was also extended. Further additions were made in the 19th century. The tower is in stone and to the north of it is a cruck-framed wing that was later encased in stone. The tower is crenellated and contains mullioned and transomed windows. On the front is a two-storey porch with a jettied timber-framed upper storey and two gables. The house is owned by the local authority and is run as a museum.	I
Dingle House, Belmont; 53.62813°N 2.45969°W	—	16th century (probable)	A cruck-framed farmhouse that was enlarged in the 17th century, it is in sandstone with a slate roof. The house has two storeys and four bays, the fourth bay projecting forward as a wing. There is a blocked doorway in the first bay, and entrance is by a lean-to porch in the angle with the wing. In the gable end of the wing is a garderobe. Inside, there are three full cruck trusses.	II
Entwistle Hall; 53.65321°N 2.41196°W		16th century (probable)	A manor house that was divided into separate dwellings as early as 1657. It is in sandstone with roofs of slate and some stone-slate, it has two storeys, and consists of a three-bay hall with cross-wings and an attached 17th-century farmhouse to the right. The hall contains some original mullioned windows, but most of the other windows have been altered. Inside, timber-framed partitions have been retained.	II*
Top of Quarlton Farmhouse; 53.63717°N 2.37496°W		16th century	A farmhouse, formerly known as Quarlton Old Hall, it was altered in the 17th and 18th centuries, and restored in the 1960s. It is in sandstone with a slate roof, with an L-shaped plan and two storeys. Many of the windows are mullioned. Inside the house there is at least one pair of cruck trusses.	II
Chapel House Farmhouse, Chapeltown; 53.63638°N 2.40388°W	—	Early 17th century (or earlier)	A sandstone farmhouse with a slate roof, probably with re-clad timber-framing, in two storeys. It consists of a two-bay range with a two-bay cross-wing on the left. Most of the windows have been altered. Inside there is much timber-framing with some wattle and daub infill, and there is also an inglenook.	II
87 and 89 High Street, Chapeltown; 53.63796°N 2.40522°W		Early 17th century (probable)	A sandstone house with a stone-slate roof, in two low storeys and two bays. To the right is a two-storey porch with a doorway and an oval window above. The other windows are mullioned. Inside the house are timber-framed partitions with wattle and daub infill, and an inglenook.	II
Orrell Fold Farmhouse; 53.66831°N 2.39810°W	—	Early 17th century (probable)	A sandstone farmhouse with a slate roof in two storeys. It has a front of three bays, with an outshut to the left of the first bay and another at the rear. There are two doorways, one of which is blocked with an inserted window. The ground floor windows are mullioned, and those in the upper floor are casements.	II
Lower House and Lower Fold; 53.63528°N 2.37348°W	—	1627	A farmhouse, later extended and converted into three dwellings, it is in sandstone with roofs of stone-slate and some slate. The building is in two storeys, the central house has two bays, and the outer houses each has one bay. The doorway of the central house has a lintel inscribed with the date. Some of the windows are mullioned and others are later replacements.	II
1 and 2 Brandwood Fold, Edgworth; 53.64328°N 2.39443°W		17th century	Originally a farmhouse, later divided into two dwellings. The building is in sandstone with quoins and a stone-slate roof. It has a U-shaped plan, with two storeys, and consists of a hall and cross-wing, with a large outshut under a catslide roof at the rear. The right wing has a porch with a Tudor arched doorway and a large lintel. Many of the windows are mullioned, and inside is an inglenook and some wattle and daub walling.	II*
Bisley Moor Side Farmhouse and barn 53.66307°N 2.39910°W	—	17th century	A farmhouse with a cottage at the left and a barn beyond this. They are in sandstone with roofs of stone-slate and some slate. The farmhouse has two storeys and two bays with a single-storey gabled porch. The windows are mullioned. The cottage is in a single bay, and the barn has two bays, a wagon entry, and an outshut.	II
Dingle Farmhouse, Edgworth; 53.65642°N 2.40301°W	—	17th century	A sandstone farmhouse with a slate roof, in two storeys and three bays with an outshut to the rear. The original doorway has a large lintel with a panel for a datestone above. The windows are mullioned.	II
Horrocks Fold Farmhouse, Edgworth; 53.64829°N 2.39745°W		17th century	A farmhouse with an 18th-century addition that has been converted into two dwellings. The building is in sandstone with roofs of stone-slate and slate. The original building has two bays and three storeys. The windows vary; some are mullioned, some are oval, and one has an ogee head. The rear extension has two bays and two storeys. Inside the original house is a large timber-framed partition.	II*
Archway, Turton Tower; 53.63281°N 2.40852°W	—	17th century (possible)	The archway is set into a wall opposite the east face of the house, and has been moved here from elsewhere. It is in sandstone, and consists of a round arch with voussoirs and roll-moulded coping giving the arch a rectangular head.	II
Summerhouse, Turton Tower; 53.63306°N 2.40746°W	—	17th century	A ruinous sandstone structure that was rebuilt in the 1840s. It consists of one room above a basement with four gables, and has a Tudor arched doorway flanked by round-headed windows. The other windows have five lights and are mullioned.	II*
Wickenlow Farmhouse, Edgworth; 53.64897°N 2.37518°W	—	17th century	A sandstone farmhouse with a stone-slate roof, in two storeys and two bays. There is an outshut at the rear and a modern lean-to on the right side. The windows are mullioned. Inside is a timber-framed partition and an inglenook with a bressumer.	II
Bromiley Farmhouse, Belmont; 53.64805°N 2.50962°W	—	Late 17th century	The farmhouse is in sandstone with quoins and a tiled roof. It has two storeys and a three-bay front with a triangular-headed doorway. Some of the windows also have triangular heads, and some are mullioned. Inside the farmhouse is an inglenook.	II
Lower Whittlestone Head Farmhouse; 53.67143°N 2.42570°W	—	Late 17th century (probable)	A sandstone farmhouse with a slate roof, it has two low storeys and is in two bays. On the front is a large single-storey gabled porch with a round-headed window in the gable above. All the windows have lost their mullions, and contain casements.	II
Green Alders, Edgworth; 53.65906°N 2.40763°W	—	1691	A sandstone farmhouse with quoins and a slate roof. It has two storeys and a three-bay front, with an outshut at the rear and an 18th-century cottage on the left. There is a projecting porch with a Tudor arched lintel, and above the string course is a decorated datestone. Most of the windows are mullioned, and there are casements in the outshut.	II
Old Barn, Turton Tower; 53.63213°N 2.40758°W	—	1697	The barn has been converted into a house. It is in sandstone with a stone-slate roof, ball finials on the gables, and it now has two storeys. On the front is a gabled porch with a ball finial. To its left are a shaped lintel, and three lancet windows with four narrow windows above; elsewhere are inserted windows. In the left gable end are a blocked mullioned window and a blocked owl hole.	II
6 and 7 Thomason Road, Edgworth; 53.64726°N 2.39692°W	—	c. 1700	Originally a farmhouse, later converted into two dwellings, it is in sandstone with a stone-slate roof. The building has two storeys and an attic, and a two-bay front with an extension at the rear. The windows vary; two of them are mullioned.	II
Barn, Entwistle Hall; 53.65316°N 2.41148°W	—	c. 1700	A sandstone barn with a stone-slate roof that has been converted into a house. It has a rectangular plan with four bays. The walls contain doorways, a wagon entrance, mullioned windows, and ventilation holes.	II
Meadowcroft's Farmhouse, Edgworth; 53.64016°N 2.38913°W	—	c. 1700	A sandstone farmhouse with a slate roof, built on a slope. It has two storeys and two bays, with an outshut and an additional bay set back to the right. The windows are mullioned. Inside the house is an inglenook and a bressumer.	II
Barn, Wayoh Fold Farm, Edgworth; 53.66288°N 2.41091°W	—	c. 1700	A sandstone barn with a roof of stone-slate and some slate. It has an L-shaped plan and is in four bays. The barn contains a wagon entrance, doorways (one with a massive lintel), mullioned windows, a first-floor loading bay, and ventilation holes.	II
Higher Whitaker Farmhouse; 53.64185°N 2.48484°W	—	Late 17th to early 18th century (probable)	A sandstone farmhouse with a slate roof, later altered and enlarged. It has two storeys, and was originally in two bays with a third bay added at the right, and is attached to farm buildings. There is a single-storey gabled porch, and the mullioned windows have been replaced by casements.	II
Farmhouse, Lower Folds, Belmont; 53.63394°N 2.47050°W	—	1704	A sandstone farmhouse with quoins and a slate roof. It has two storeys and a three-bay with an outshut on the left. Above the doorway is a large inscribed . Over this is a round-headed window, some of the other windows are mullioned, and other are modern casements.	II
6 and 7 Isherwood Fold, Edgworth; 53.65125°N 2.39975°W	—	1712	A pair of sandstone cottages with quoins and a slate roof, extended later to the right. They have two storeys, the extension having a single storey, and five-bay front. The left doorway has a lintel with an inscribed panel. Some of the windows are mullioned.	II
Old Parsonage, Chapeltown; 53.64505°N 2.41213°W	—	1714	A sandstone house with a stone-slate roof, it has two storeys and a symmetrical three-bay front. The segmental-headed doorway has a moulded surround, and above it is an inscribed plaque containing a coat of arms. All the windows on the front are casements. On the left side is a round-headed lancet window at attic level.	II
2 and 4 Hob Lane, Edgworth, 53.65361°N 2.40173°W		1717	A farmhouse, later converted into a house, in sandstone with a slate roof. It has two storeys and a three-bay front. The central doorway has a large inscribed lintel, and the windows have mullions.	II
Hill Top Farmhouse, Edgworth; 53.65762°N 2.39780°W	—	1721	A farmhouse with a loomshop extending from the rear in sandstone with slate roofs, and in two storeys. The house has two bays, mullioned windows, and an inscribed lintel. The loomshop has three bays and runs of casement windows. Inside the house is a timber inglenook and a bressumer.	II
1 Isherwood Fold, Edgworth; 53.65104°N 2.39953°W	—	Early 18th century (probable)	A sandstone farmhouse with a slate roof. The main part has two storeys and an attic and is in two bays. There are two two-storey two-bay extensions to the right, each stepped down and stepped back, and a single storey extension at the rear. The doorway has a large lintel, and the windows have mullions.	II
Barn, Dingle Farm, Edgworth; 53.65678°N 2.40276°W	—	1727	A sandstone barn with a corrugated sheet roof. It has a broad rectangular plan, and has a front of three bays. In the south wall is a segmental arch, now blocked, with a keystone, above which is a plaque with an inscription including the date. In the gable end facing the road is a mullioned window.	II
Fogg's Cottage, Over Houses; 53.64543°N 2.41220°W		1729	Originally a farmhouse, it is in sandstone with a stone-slate roof. There are two storeys and a two-bay front. On the front is a single-storey gabled porch containing a stone bench, and with a datestone over the inner doorway. The windows are mullioned. To the right is a single-storey lean-to.	II
Pike House, Edgworth; 53.66902°N 2.41956°W	—	1740	A farmhouse, later used as a house, in sandstone with large quoins and a slate roof. It has two storeys and two bays. There is a central doorway with a chamfered surround, above which is a large inscribed lintel. The windows are mullioned.	II
New Hall and cottage, Entwistle; 53.65544°N 2.41473°W		1742	A sandstone house with a stone-slate roof, it has two storeys and a two-bay front, together with a two-bay cottage as an extension to the rear. In the centre of the symmetrical front is a two-storey gabled porch. Above the doorway is a large lintel and an inscribed plaque, over which is an oval window. The other windows are mullioned.	II*
Chetham Arms, Chapeltown; 53.63767°N 2.40501°W		1746	A sandstone public house with a slate roof that was later extended. It has three storeys, and was originally in three symmetrical bays, with another bay added later to the right. Above the doorway is a panel with the Chetham arms and the date. Most of the windows are sashes, some of them horizontally-sliding.	II
Nabbs Cottage, Chapeltown; 53.64704°N 2.41653°W	—	1748	A farmhouse and an attached farm building in sandstone with a slate roof. The house has two storeys and two bays with a single-storey porch. The windows are mullioned. To the left is a barn with a doorway over which is an inscribed lintel, and in the gable end facing the road is an owl hole. Inside the house are timber-framed partitions.	II
110–114 High Street, Chapeltown; 53.63852°N 2.40517°W	—	1749	The building consists of a farmhouse with a shippon to the left and a cottage with an outshut to the right. They are built in sandstone with roofs of stone-slate and some slate. The shippon has a round arch, now blocked with an inserted window, and the windows are mullioned.	II
75 High Street, Chapeltown; 53.63740°N 2.40468°W		Mid 18th century (probable)	A sandstone house with a slate roof. It has two storeys and a two-bay front. The doorway is offset to the left of the centre, and each storeys are two three-light mullioned windows.	II
97 High Street, Chapeltown; 53.63816°N 2.40536°W		18th century	A sandstone house with a stone-slate roof and two storeys. It has a two-bay front, with the remains of a former school behind the right bay. The almost symmetrical front has a slightly projecting gabled porch in Jacobean style. In the gable is a panel containing a crest, and on the apex is a large finial. The windows are mullioned. Behind the right bay is a wall containing an elaborate Gothic archway with a panel containing the Chetham arms.	II
3–5 Brandwood Fold, Edgworth; 53.64324°N 2.39405°W	—	18th century	A row of three (formerly four) cottages in sandstone with a stone[slate roof in two levels. They have two storeys, and the row has four bays; half has a single-pile plan and the other half a double-pile plan. The windows are casements.	II
6–10 Brandwood Fold, Edgworth; 53.64308°N 2.39385°W	—	18th century	A house, formerly a farmhouse, and an attached row of four cottages in sandstone, all with two storeys. No. 6 is the house, with an L-shaped plan, three bays, and a stone-slate roof. The cottages each has one bay, a doorway, one window on each floor, and a slate roof.	II
Entwistle Hall Cottage; 53.65344°N 2.41195°W	—	18th century	The cottage is in sandstone with a slate roof. It has two storeys and a two-bay front. Some windows are mullioned, some are casements, and others are blocked.	II
Garden Wall, Entwistle Hall; 53.65314°N 2.41189°W	—	18th century (probable)	The garden wall is in sandstone, it is about 25 metres (82 ft) long and 1.5 metres (5 ft) high. There is a gateway at the west end, and on the south side are seven rectangular recesses.	II
Over Houses, Chapeltown; 53.64509°N 2.41259°W		18th century	A row of three sandstone cottages with a slate roof. They have two storeys, and there is a single bay to each cottage. The cottages all have a doorway, and there is a three-light mullioned window in each floor.	II
Village stocks, Chapeltown; 53.63834°N 2.40550°W		18th or 19th century	The stocks consist of two stone side supports and two wooden beams with holes for legs.	II
Waterworks Cottage, Belmont; 53.62559°N 2.46800°W		1824	A stone house with a slate roof in Tudor style with a T-shaped plan. It has a two-storey two-bay range, a two-storey wing to the right, and a short single-storey wing to the left. The doorway and the windows have Tudor arched heads, and the windows are mullioned. In the gable facing the road is a plaque containing a relief, the date, and an inscription.	II
Plaque near Springs Reservoir, Belmont; 53.62575°N 2.46778°W		1824 (probable)	The plaque is set into a wall and consists of a low relief depicting a woman pouring water into a vessel held by a child. Underneath is a cast iron plate inscribed "BOLTON WATER WORKS".	II
Ashworth Monument, Chapletown; 53.63673°N 2.40311°W	—	Early 19th century	The monument to members of the Ashworth family is in the churchyard of St Anne's Church. It is in sandstone and consists of raised tomb chest in Classical style. The chest tomb stands on a square base and pediment, and has a cornice and a pyramidal roof with a square urn. On the sides are inscriptions.	II
Guidepost; 53.64507°N 2.45594°W	—	Early 19th century (probable)	The guidepost is at a junction on the Stones Bank Road. It consists of a rectangular stone post about 0.5 metres (1.6 ft) high and is inscribed on three sides indicating the directions to Bolton, Darwen, Blackburn, Belmont, and Chorley.	II
Pack Saddle Bridge; 53.63740°N 2.39820°W		Early 19th century (probable)	A sandstone bridge carrying a footpath over Bradshaw Brook. It consists of a single segmental arch with a narrow deck and a low ridged parapet with railings.	II
Spring Bank, Chapeltown; 53.64370°N 2.41559°W	—	Early 19th century	A sandstone house with a hipped slate roof in Classical style. It has two storeys and a symmetrical three-bay front, with service wings at the rear. In the centre is a Tuscan doorcase with a segmental fanlight. The windows are sashes, and at the top of the house is a moulded cornice and a low parapet.	II
Methodist Sunday School, Edgworth; 53.64393°N 2.39452°W	—	1828	Originally a Methodist chapel, later converted into a school it is in sandstone with a slate roof. It has a rectangular plan, in two storeys, with three bays on the front and four on the sides. The symmetrical west front has a central Doric doorway with a cornice, round-headed windows with imposts and keystones, and a datestone in the gable. There are rectangular side walls, and an extension on the left side.	II
Clough House Farmhouse, Chapeltown; 53.63848°N 2.41556°W	—	c. 1840	The farmhouse is in ferme ornée style, built in rendered sandstone and with a stone-slate roof. It has an E-shaped plan, is in two storeys, and has a five-bay main block and two cross-wings. In the centre is a two-storey porch with a shield in the gable. The windows are mullioned and those in the ground floor are also transomed. At the rear is a stair turret and a three-bay two storey outshut.	II
Gate piers, Turton Tower; 53.63217°N 2.40892°W		c. 1840 (probable)	The gateway contains a pair of gate piers in rusticated ashlar. These are square with moulded caps and ball finials, and between them are wrought iron gates with crests.	II
St Anne's Church, Chapletown; 53.63718°N 2.40298°W		1840–41	The church, designed by John Palmer in Decorated style, is in sandstone with a slate roof. It consists of a nave with aisles, a short chancel, and a west steeple. The steeple has a four-stage tower, angle buttresses, a west door and west window, clock faces, an embattled parapet with pinnacles, and an octagonal spire with two tiers of lucarnes.	II
Bradshaw Brook Viaduct; 53.64941°N 2.41436°W		1847–48	The viaduct was built to carry the Blackburn, Darwen and Bolton Railway over Bradshaw Brook. It is built in sandstone and brick, it is slightly curved, and it is 120 feet (37 m) high. The viaduct has stone piers carrying nine semicircular arches with spans of 50 feet (15 m).	II
Railway bridge (north); 53.63439°N 2.40984°W		1847–48	An accommodation bridge over the railway near to Turton Tower, built for James Kay to cross the Blackburn, Darwen and Bolton Railway. It is built in gritstone, it is in medieval style, and has a single four-centred arch. The piers at the western end rise to form turrets.	II
Railway bridge (south); 53.63197°N 2.41096°W		1847–48	The bridge was built for James Kay to cross the Blackburn, Darwen and Bolton Railway, and it carries a track over the railway near to Turton Tower. It is built in gritstone, it is in medieval style, and has a single four-centred arch. The piers at the western end rise to form turrets. The parapet is stepped above the arch, and contains cross-shaped arrow slits. There are smaller turrets at the east end of the arch and at the ends of the parapets, and a refuge on the south side of the bridge.	II
St Peter's Church, Belmont; 53.63792°N 2.49553°W		1849–50	A sandstone church with a slate roof by J. E. Gregan in Early English style. It consists of a nave with a clerestory, aisles, a chancel, and a west steeple. The steeple has a three-stage tower with angle buttresses, a west doorway, a parapet, pinnacles, and a broach spire with three tiers of lucarnes.	II
Greenthorne, Edgworth; 53.65045°N 2.38885°W	—	1860	A sandstone mansion in Gothic style, with an asymmetrical rectangular plan. The mansion is in two and 2 1/2 storeys. On the entrance front is a two-storey porch containing a triangular-headed doorway and a parapet. To the right is a gabled dormer, and to the right of this a gabled cross-wing with an oriel window. On the right side of the house is a canted bay window, and a rectangular conservatory. The windows are mullioned or mullioned and transomed.	II
Former Edgworth Methodist Church, wall, gates and piers 53.64230°N 2.39600°W		1863	The church is built in sandstone, gritstone and Peterhead granite, it has a Welsh slate roof, and is in Early English style. It consists of a nave, a chancel in the form of a polygonal apse, a northeast vestry, and a northwest steeple. The steeple has a tower with three stages, stepped buttresses, a west doorway, and a banded broach spire. The boundary wall has shaped copings and rails, and contains piers and gates with piers at the entrance.	II
Greenhouse, Greenthorne, Edgworth; 53.65088°N 2.38978°W	—	Late 19th century	The greenhouse is a glazed structure ten bays long. It is built against a high stone wall, and has low walls at the sides and front. In the centre is a slightly higher canted bay with a hipped roof and a finial.	II
Monument, Belmont; 53.63782°N 2.49346°W		1907	The monument is in stone and consists of a square pedestal with a tapering chamfered pier carrying a pyramidal cap surmounted by a ball finial. On the pier is a long inscription. The monument celebrates a victory won in the Houses of Parliament concerning the supply of water from the nearby reservoir.	II
Telephone kiosk, Edgworth; 53.64059°N 2.39621°W	—	1935	A K6 type telephone kiosk, designed by Giles Gilbert Scott, located outside Edgworth Post Office]. Constructed in cast iron with a square plan and a dome, it has three unperforated crowns in the top panels.	II
Telephone kiosk, Entwistle; 53.65495°N 2.41412°W		1935	A K6 type telephone kiosk, designed by Giles Gilbert Scott, located outside Entwistle railway station. Constructed in cast iron with a square plan and a dome, it has three unperforated crowns in the top panels.	II
Market cross, Chapeltown; 53.63842°N 2.40537°W	—	Undated	The date of the cross is uncertain, although the square stone base may be medieval. On the base is a short pedestal and a wooden shaft about 2 metres (6.6 ft) high. At the top is a small cap and a horizontal cross.	II
