= Turton Tower =

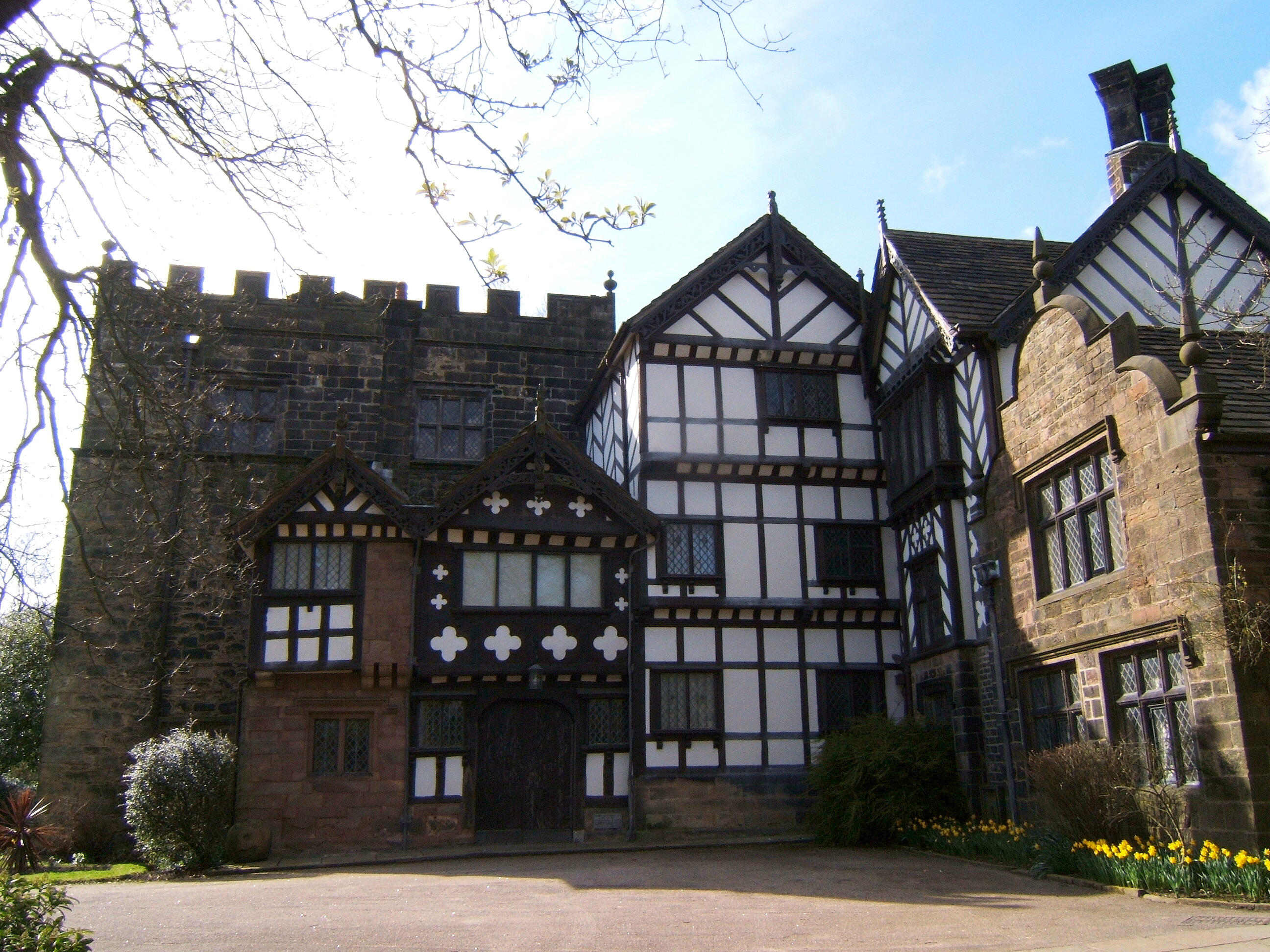

- Location within Blackburn with Darwen

General information
- Type: Manor house
- Location: Chapeltown, Blackburn with Darwen, Lancashire, England
- Coordinates: 53.6330°N 2.4075°W
- Construction started: Early 15th century
- Completed: 1596
- Owner: Blackburn with Darwen Council

Listed Building – Grade I
- Designated: 27 January 1967
- Reference no.: 1241557

Turton Tower is a manor house in Chapeltown in North Turton, Borough of Blackburn with Darwen, Lancashire, England. It is a scheduled ancient monument and a Grade I listed building.

It was built in the late Middle Ages as a two-storey stone pele tower which was altered and enlarged mainly in late 16th century. It is built on high ground 600 feet above sea level about four miles north of Bolton. William Camden described it as being built "amongst precipices and wastes." A north wing and additions were made during the reign of Queen Elizabeth I and alterations were made during the early years of Queen Victoria.

== Structure ==
The oldest part of the building, which was probably built in the early 15th century, is the stone pele tower which measures 14 metres (45 ft) in length from north to south and is 8.5 metres (28 ft) in width. It is about 11 metres (35 ft) in height with walls 1.2 metres (4 ft) thick. In the northwest corner of the tower, the shaft of a garderobe projects from the main structure. The tower had three low storeys as evidenced by the blocked window openings. Its walls are rough with large corner quoins.

During the early 16th century, two cruck framed buildings were added to the tower, and later an extension at the front of the house created the entrance with its imposing front door. Inside the building, this Tudor architecture can be seen, including part of the cruck structure along with exposed and restored sections of the wattle and daub and lath and plaster wall panelling. The entrance and entrance hall belonged to the rebuilding of 1596 when vast changes were made, and the tower raised to its present height. The new upper storey was built in ashlar stone separated from the old rubble walling by a moulded string course. The old floors were removed, and the walls were raised to 45 feet to the top of the battlements. The narrow windows were blocked up, and replaced by large three, four, and five-light mullioned and transomed windows, transforming the appearance of the old part of the building. During the 17th century, the cruck buildings were clad in stone and the structure remained unchanged until the 19th century. Small alterations in the 18th and early 19th century by the Chetham family before the house passed to Kay family. After 1835 the Kay's were responsible for Victorian renovations, including the Dutch gable façade. Other alterations include the Ashworth and Bradshaw rooms.

== Occupants ==
Turton Tower was home to the lords of the Manor of Turton and, in about 1200, was part of the barony of Manchester, by which time part of the manor was in the hands of the de Lathom family. It was inherited in 1420 by the Orrells, who rebuilt the pele tower. In 1603 William Camden described it as built first for defence, that tournaments were held there in the 14th century and that it was entirely rebuilt of stone in 1594. In 1628 the Orrells sold Turton Tower to Humphrey Chetham, the Manchester merchant responsible for the creation of Chetham's Library and Chetham's School of Music. It passed to his descendants, the Bland, Green and Frere families who leased it to a succession of tenant farmers.

The tower was sold in a state of disrepair in 1835 to James Kay, who restored it. He sold the tower to Elizabeth and Anne Appleton who leased it to William Rigg, a calico manufacturer, whose daughter, Ellen, wrote "Victorian Children at Turton Tower". In 1903 the tower was bought by Sir Lees Knowles, 1st Baronet, MP for Salford West, for £3,875. After his death in 1929, his widow, Lady Nina Knowles, presented it to Turton Urban District Council in 1930, and it became the council's seat of local government.

After local government re-organisation in 1974, Turton was split, and the tower became part of the new Borough of Blackburn and was administered by Lancashire County Museums Service. Following changes to the Lancashire County Museum Service, the tower was taken over by Blackburn with Darwen Council.

== Gallery ==
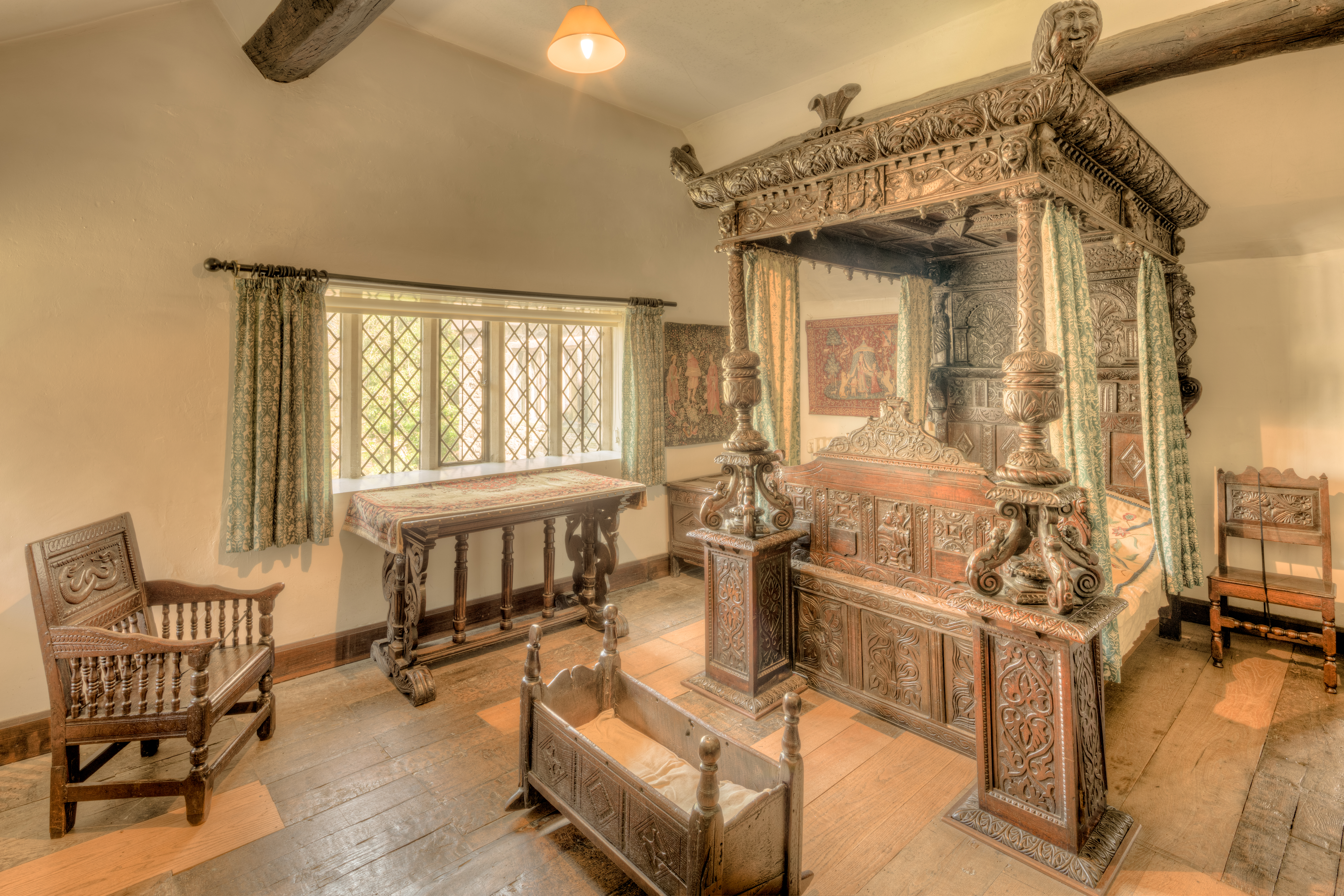
The Tapestry Bedroom

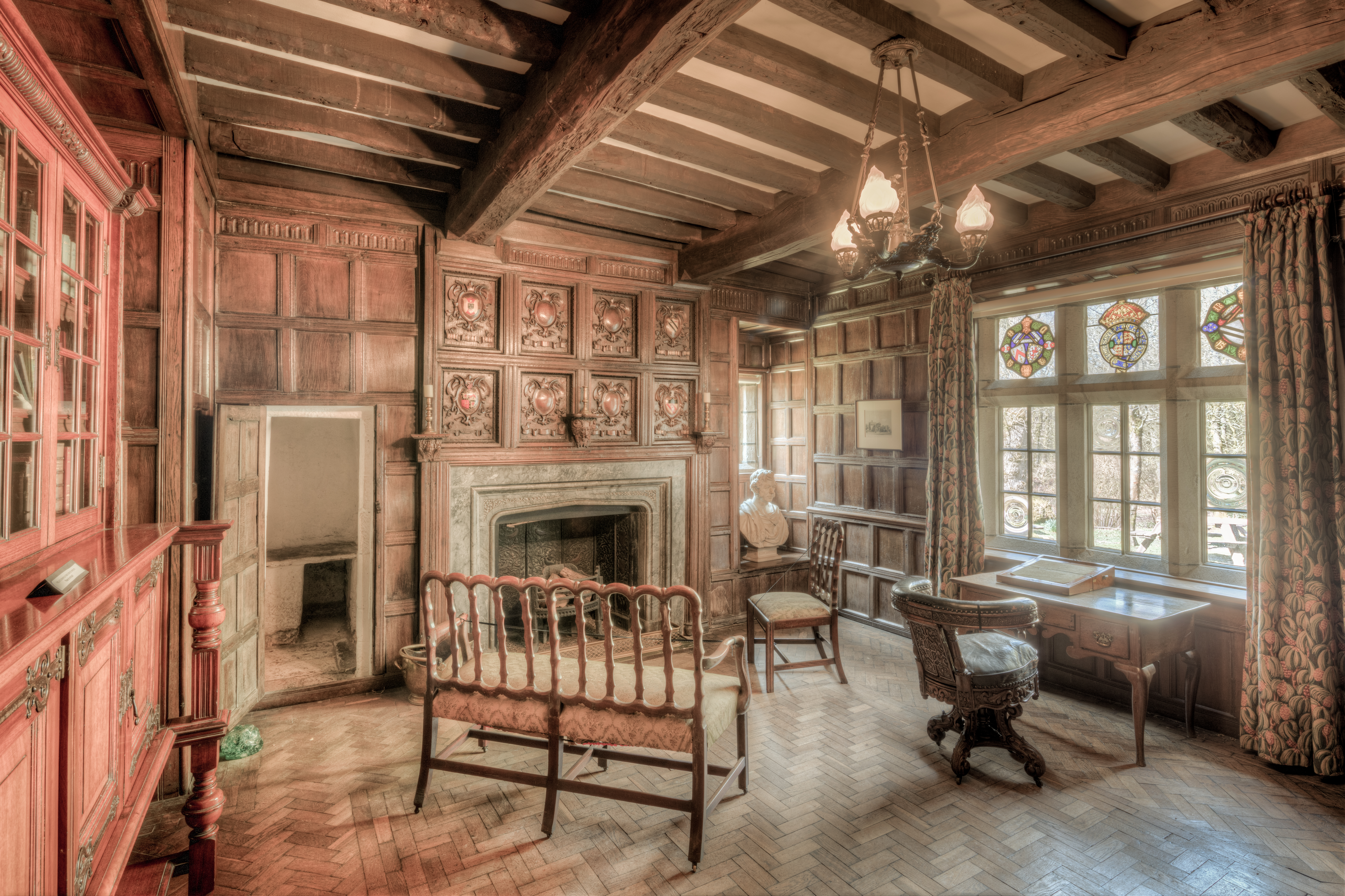
The Morning Room

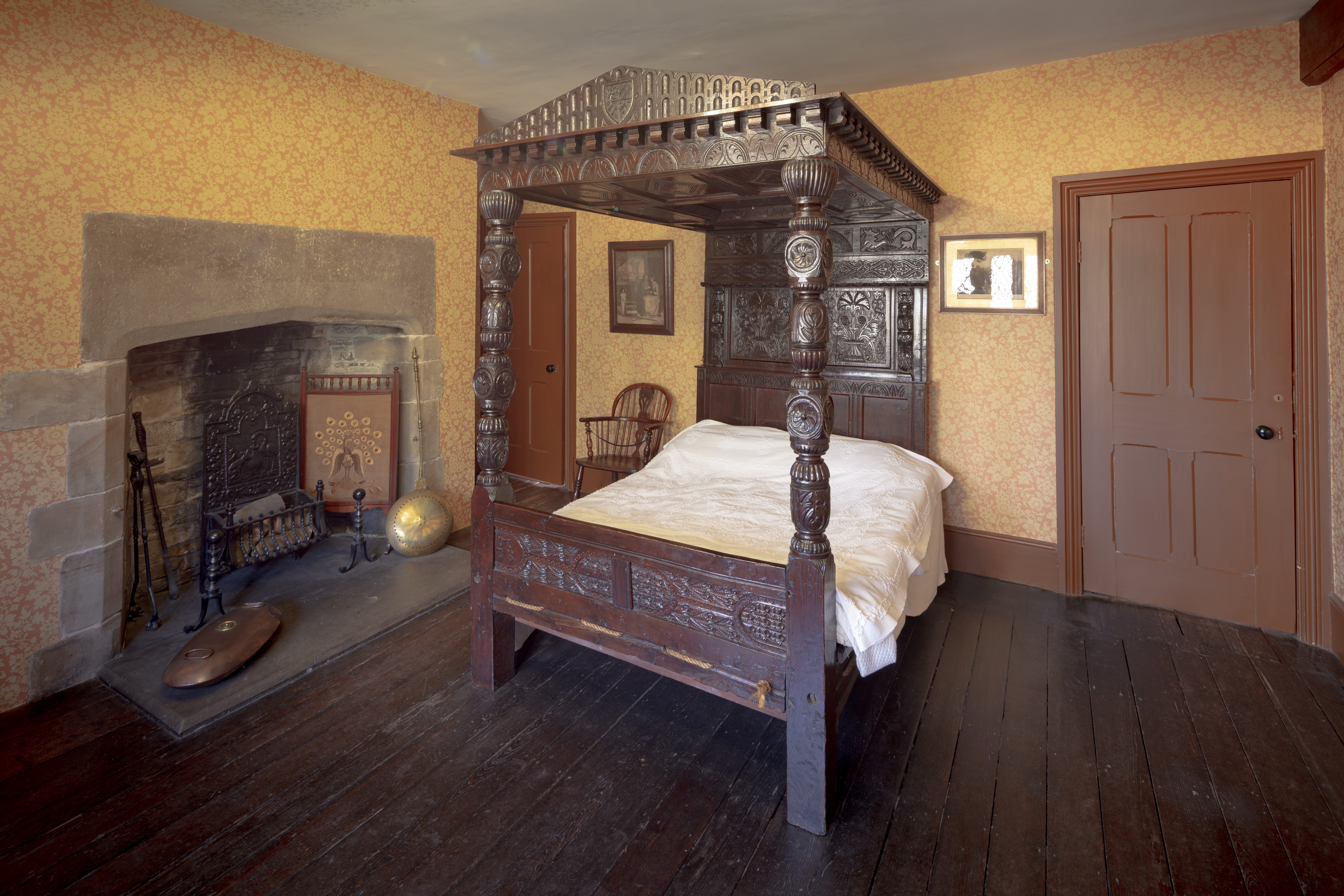
The Bradshaw Bedroom

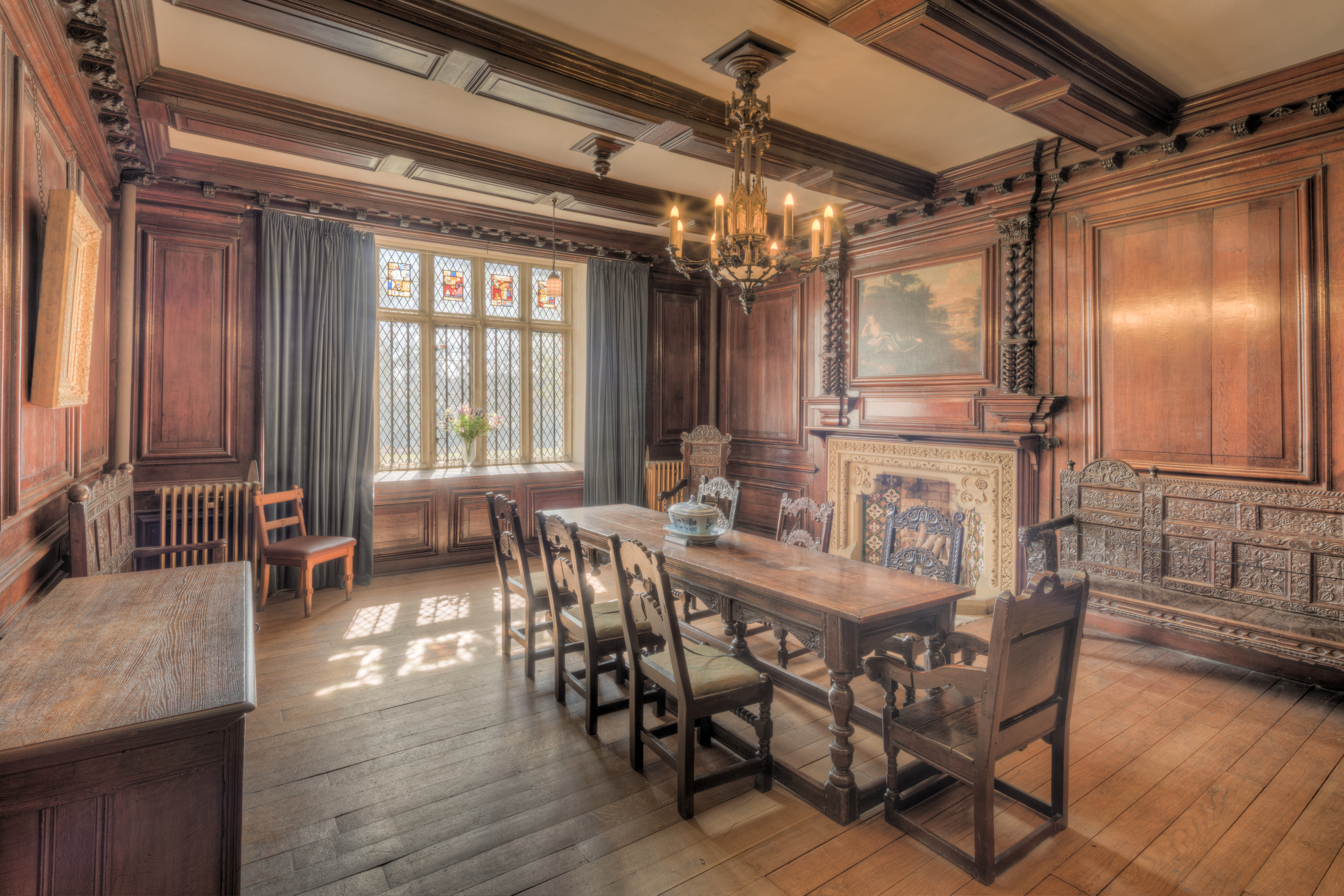
The Dining Room

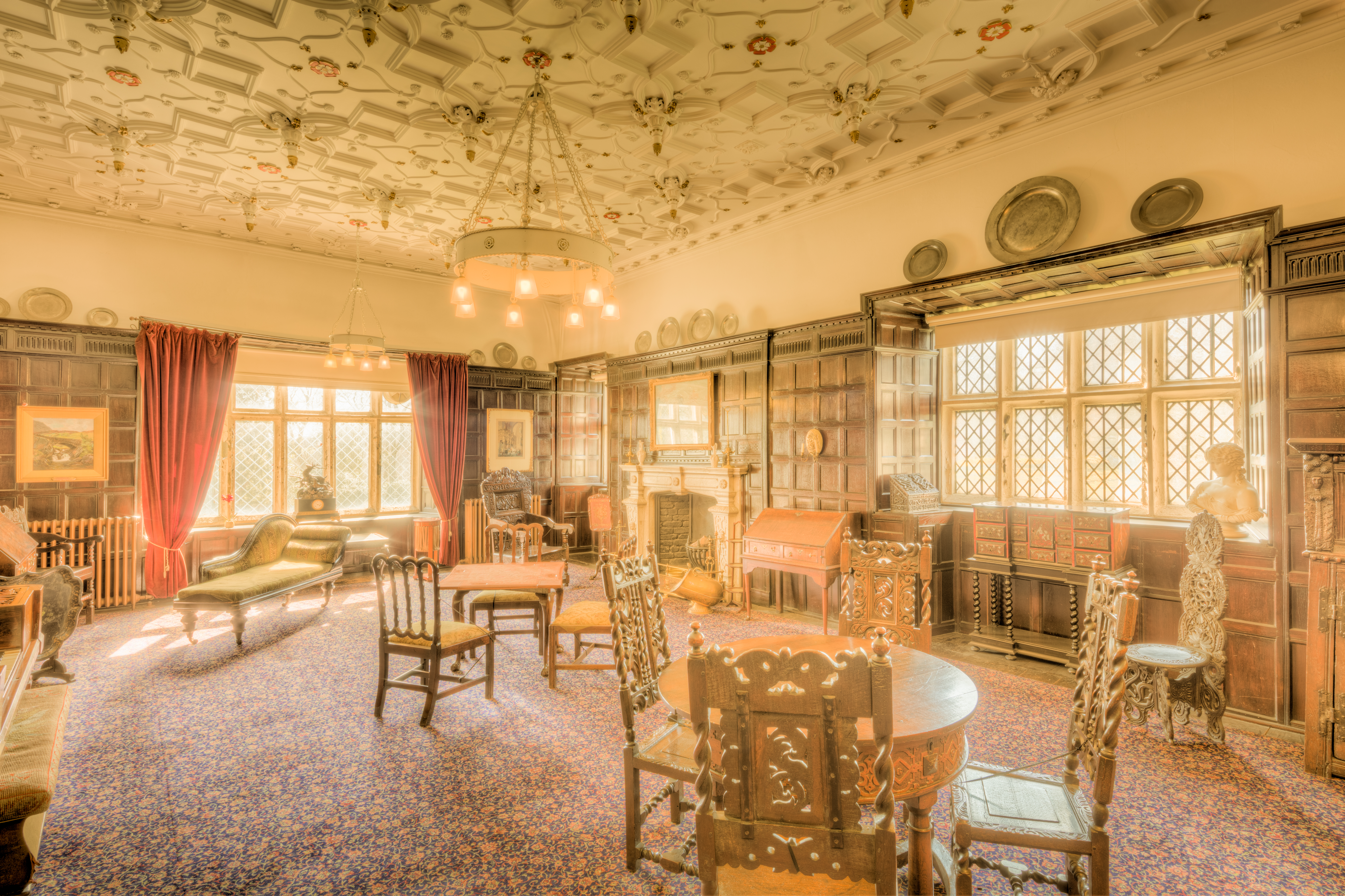
The Drawing Room

== See also ==
- Listed buildings in North Turton

== Bibliography ==
- Historic England, "Turton Tower (Grade I) (1241557)", National Heritage List for England
