= Listed buildings in Pleasington =

Pleasington is a civil parish in Blackburn with Darwen, Lancashire, England. The parish contains 12 buildings that are recorded in the National Heritage List for England as designated listed buildings. Of these, one is listed at Grade I, the highest of the three grades, one at Grade II*, the middle grade, and the others are at Grade II, the lowest grade. Apart from the village of Pleasington, the parish is rural, and many of the listed buildings are farmhouses. The other listed buildings are the parish church, an ice house, an entrance to Woodfold Park, and three bridges.

== Key ==
Grade	Criteria
I	Buildings of exceptional interest, sometimes considered to be internationally important
II*	Particularly important buildings of more than special interest
II	Buildings of national importance and special interest

== Buildings ==
Name and location	Photograph	Date	Notes	Grade
Old Hall Farmhouse; 53.73781°N 2.53819°W		1587	A manor house, later a farmhouse, in sandstone and some brick, partly rendered, with a stone-slate roof. It has an H-shaped plan, consisting of a hall and cross-wings, and is in two storeys. The two-storey porch has a Tudor arched doorway with a carved lintel. Most of the windows are mullioned, and one is also transomed.	II*
Higher Twist Field Farmhouse; 53.74539°N 2.53987°W	—	17th century (probable)	The farmhouse is in whitewashed sandstone, it has a rectangular three-bay plan, and is in two storeys. On the front is a modern extension, to the right of which is a doorway, and to the right of this is an external flight of steps leading to a first-floor entrance. At the rear is a mullioned window, and inside the farmhouse is an inglenook and a bressumer.	II
Haydock Fold; 53.74385°N 2.52938°W	—	Late 17th century	A sandstone farmhouse with a stone-slate roof, in two storeys and three bays. The windows are mullioned, and inside the building is an inglenook and a bressumer.	II
Tongue Hill Farmhouse; 53.73324°N 2.53776°W		1735	A sandstone farmhouse with a stone-slate roof in two storeys and with a rectangular three-bay plan. The doorway has a moulded cornice, and above it is a datestone. The windows are mullioned.	II
Lower Bencock Farmhouse; 53.75635°N 2.52785°W		18th century	The sandstone farmhouse has a tiled roof, and is in two storeys and two bays. At the left end is a single-storey porch. To the left of the doorway is a casement window in each floor, and to the right are three windows in the lower floor and one above.	II
Close Farmhouse; 53.74609°N 2.55275°W		1782	The farmhouse is in sandstone with a stone-slate roof, and has two storeys and a symmetrical two-bay front. On the left side is a single-storey lean-to. On the front is a porch, and the windows are sashes.	II
Bridge over Arley Brook; 53.75695°N 2.55039°W	—	c. 1800	The bridge carries the drive to Woodfold Hall over Arley Brook. It is in stone, and consists of a single semicircular arch with rusticated voussoirs, pilasters, a moulded cornice, and balustraded parapets with panelled piers and moulded coping.	II
Ice house 53.75583°N 2.54911°W	—	c. 1800	The ice house is in Old Woodfold Wood. It is built in brick and sandstone and is covered in earth. It is mainly below ground and consists of an egg-shaped vessel. In parts, only the foundations remain.	II
Lodges and gateway, Woodfold Park; 53.74771°N 2.54684°W		c. 1800	A matching pair of lodges flank the entrance to Woodfold Park. They are in sandstone, and each has a square plan, a single storey, and a pyramidal roof. Two of the sides have round-headed windows, and in the other sides are rectangular windows. Between the lodges are screen walls containing arches, then cylindrical gate piers with ornamental iron gates.	II
Church of St. Mary and St. John the Baptist; 53.73503°N 2.54287°W		1816–19	A Roman Catholic church designed by John Palmer in Gothic style, it is built in stone with slate roofs. The church consists of a nave with a clerestory, battlemented aisles, and a polygonal apse. At the west end is a portal over which are three statues on corbels, a rose window, and a gable with a cross. The west end is flanked by octagonal turrets, each with a three-stage pinnacle.	I
Walk Mill Bridge; 53.72643°N 2.54199°W	—	Early 19th century (probable)	The road bridge carries Enoch Brow over the River Darwen. It is in sandstone, and consists of a single arch. The two sides are different, the south side being more elaborate. Both sides have parapets with ridged coping.	II
Alum Scar Bridge; 53.75010°N 2.55379°W		19th century (probable)	The bridge is probably the replacement of an earlier bridge. It is in sandstone and consists of a single high segmental arch carrying a track across Alum House Brook. The side walls are buttressed between abutments, and there is rounded coping in the middle of the parapets.	II
