= St Anne's Church, Turton =

St Anne's Church
- The Parish Church of St Anne, Turton
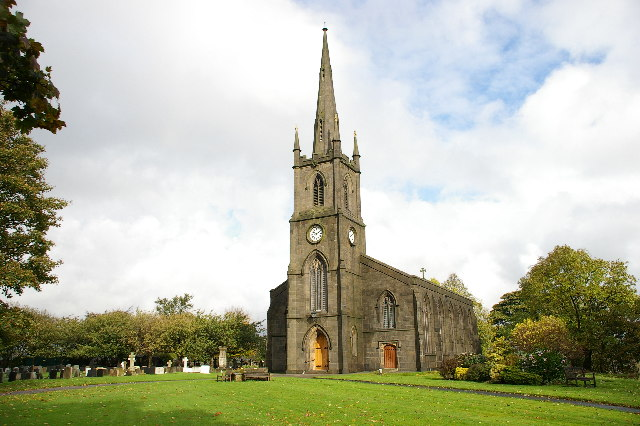
- St Anne's Church
- 53.63718°N 2.40298°W
- OS grid reference: SD 73457 15709
- Location: Chapeltown, Turton, Lancashire
- Country: England
- Denomination: Church of England
- Website: stanneswithstjames.co.uk

History
- Former name: St Bartholomew's Church
- Status: Parish Church
- Founded: 1111
- Dedication: Saint Anne (previously to St. Bartholomew, a derivative of Saint Botolph)
- Consecrated: 2 October 1841 (present church)

Architecture
- Heritage designation: Grade II listed building
- Years built: 1840–1841

Administration
- Province: York
- Diocese: Manchester
- Archdeaconry: Bolton
- Deanery: Bolton

St Anne's Church is a Grade II listed building in Chapeltown, Turton, in the Borough of Blackburn with Darwen, Lancashire, England. It is an active Church of England parish church in the Diocese of Manchester and is part of the Deanery of Bolton and Archdeaconry of Bolton.

== History ==
The first church was built in 1111 and dedicated to Saint Bartholomew, a derivative of Saint Botolph, but was rededicated to St Anne in the early 18th century. It was known as the Chapel of Turton and was a chapel of ease in the parish of Bolton le Moors. The chapel was rebuilt in 1630 and again in 1779. The present parish church was built between 1840 and 1841, the architect was probably John Palmer. The ecclesiastical parish was formed in 1837.

== Structure ==
The church, designed by John Palmer in Decorated style, is in sandstone with a slate roof. It consists of a nave with aisles, a short chancel, and a west steeple. The steeple has a four-stage tower, angle buttresses, a west door and west window, clock faces, an embattled parapet with pinnacles, and an octagonal spire with two tiers of lucarnes.
