= Cheetham Close =

Megalithic site in Lancashire, England

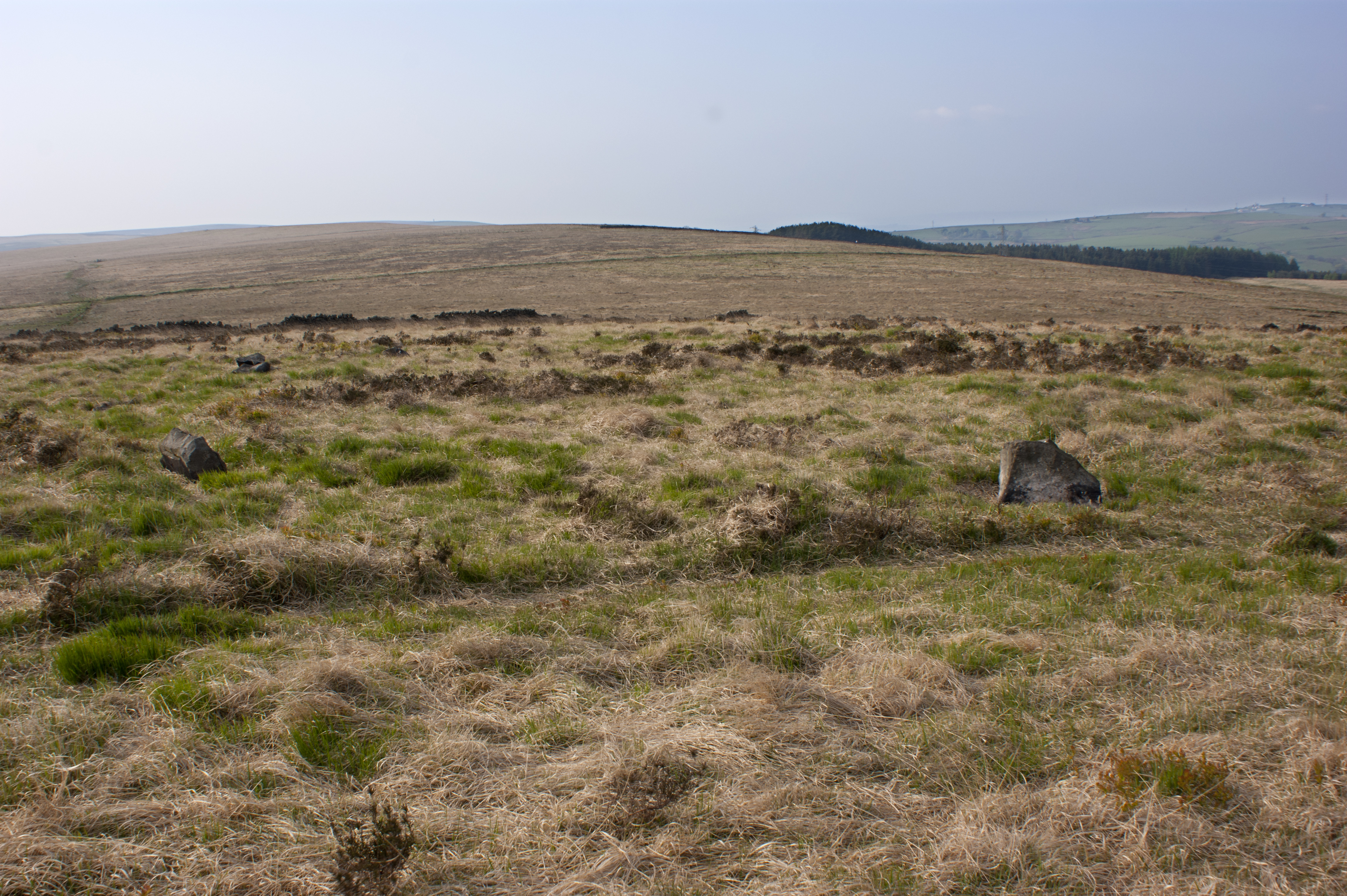
- Site of Cheetham Close

- Shown on the border of Blackburn with Darwen
- 53.638839°N 2.431014°W
- Type: Stone circle and ring cairn
- Periods: Bronze Age
- Location: Lancashire

Scheduled monument
- Designated: 30 November 1925
- Reference no.: 1009121

Cheetham Close is a megalithic site and scheduled ancient monument located in Lancashire, very close to the boundary with Greater Manchester, England. The megalith was in good condition until a farmer from Turton sledgehammered the circle in the 1870s. According to an article published in 1829, Cheetham Close was once a druidical ritual place and a Roman road passed 'within two hundred yards' of the megalith.

The stone circle at Cheetham Close measured about 18.5 metres (61 ft) in diameter. Six stones are definitely part of the circle and other smaller stones are scattered about the place. The monument has been damaged, and the stones fractured.

== Archaeological surveys ==
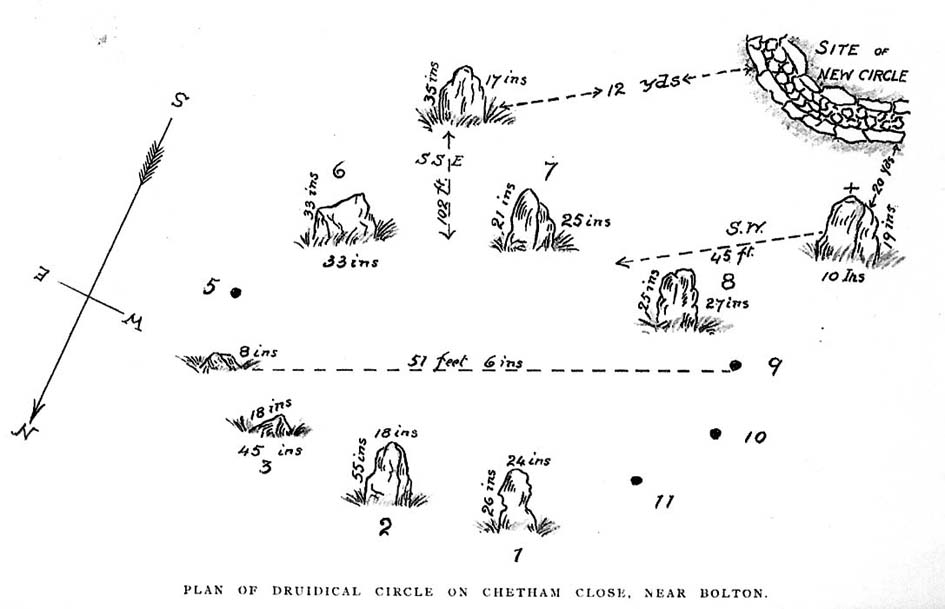
A plan of Cheetham Close taken in 1871.

The area was surveyed in 1850 by Dryden, who identified a circle of six stones. In 1871 Greenhalgh identified a seventh stone and drew attention to the destruction of the site. In 1894 French discovered a second site which was a "ring bank" type cairn. A saddle quern was found in 1954 and the site was scheduled in 1958. Three barbed and tanged arrowheads were found at a third site in 1959.

In 1983 a large-scale survey was undertaken by the Bury Archaeological Group and M. Fletcher. The stone circle was in a severely damaged state, with only two of the seven megaliths still in situ. The site probably originally contained ten equally spaced gritstone slabs.

The ring cairn lies to the south of the stone circle. Fletcher suggests that Cheetham Close dates from an early period between 2100 and 1500 BC in the Early Bronze Age. The quern and arrowheads suggest the settlers were a pastoral community who supplemented their diet by hunting.

== See also ==
- Scheduled monuments in Lancashire
- Humphrey Chetham (1580–1653), local landowner and merchant
