= Crumpsall Park =

Park in Manchester, England

Coordinates: 53°30′57″N 2°14′01″W

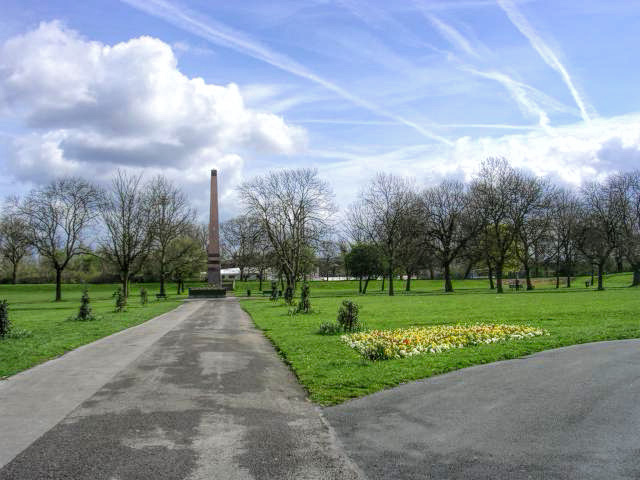
The Obelisk in Crumpsall Park

Crumpsall Park is a small municipal park in the Crumpsall ward of Manchester, North West England.

Originally planned as a cemetery, the plot was made into a recreational park in 1890 CE.

The area in which the park is located was the site of the residence of the Chetham family - known as Crumpsall Hall - the earlier Crumpsall Old Hall was situated at the junction of Sandy Lane (now Crescent Road) and Cheetham Street, (now Humphrey Street) and this was the birthplace of Humphrey Chetham.

The park has been awarded the Green Flag Award for recreational park excellence annually since 2005.

A voluntary organisation known as the Friends of Crumpsall Park (FoCP) serves as a pressure group, events organiser and development monitor for the park, and works in liaison with Manchester City Council and other funding bodies.

The main event of the year is the annual Crumpsall Carnival.
