= Pleasington =

Coordinates: 53.733°N 2.544°W

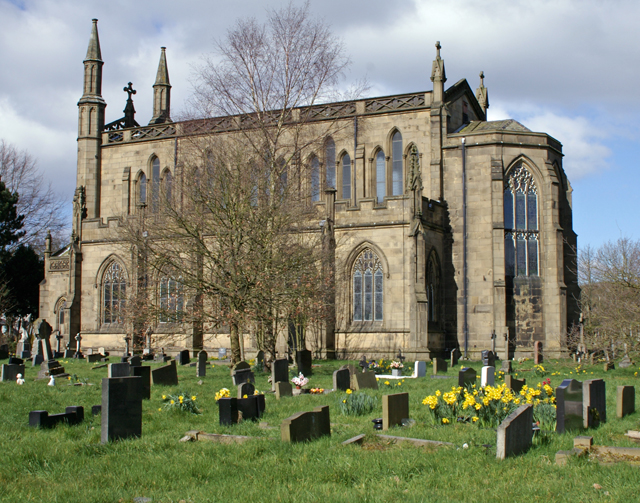
- Pleasington Priory

- Shown within Blackburn with Darwen Location within Lancashire
- Population: 446 (2011)
- OS grid reference: SD642263
- Civil parish: Pleasington
- Unitary authority: Blackburn with Darwen
- Ceremonial county: Lancashire
- Region: North West
- Country: England
- Sovereign state: United Kingdom
- Post town: BLACKBURN
- Postcode district: BB2
- Dialling code: 01254
- Police: Lancashire
- Fire: Lancashire
- Ambulance: North West
- UK Parliament: Blackburn

Pleasington (/ˈplɛzɪŋtən/) is a village and civil parish in the Borough of Blackburn with Darwen, Lancashire, England. It had a population of 467 in the 2001 census, reducing to 446 at the 2011 census.

It is a rural village set on a hillside above the River Darwen. The village was listed in the Domesday Book as Plesigtune, a name which means "a settlement owned by Plessa's People".

Pleasington railway station is on the East Lancashire Line with trains to destinations including the nearby towns of Blackburn and Preston.

The Roman Catholic Church of St Mary and St John Baptist in the village is known as Pleasington Priory and was built between 1816 and 1819 in a Gothic style. It is one of only two Grade I Listed buildings in the borough of Blackburn with Darwen.

Pleasington Old Hall is another historic building, built in 1587, and is Grade II Listed. A nature reserve near the hall was declared in 2006.

Also near the village is Pleasington Playing Fields, a large outdoor sports facility with 12 football pitches opened in 1963 by Prince Philip, Duke of Edinburgh as King George's Fields. Witton Country Park is connected to the playing fields by a bridge over the River Darwen. Overlooking the area is Pleasington Cemetery, the main cemetery and crematorium for the Blackburn area.

Pleasington is on the National Cycle Network Route 6, one of the main national bicycle routes in the UK, which is planned to connect Windsor to the Lake District.

== See also ==
- Listed buildings in Pleasington
