= Pleasington Priory =

Coordinates: 53.7350°N 2.5429°W

- Church of St Mary and St John Baptist
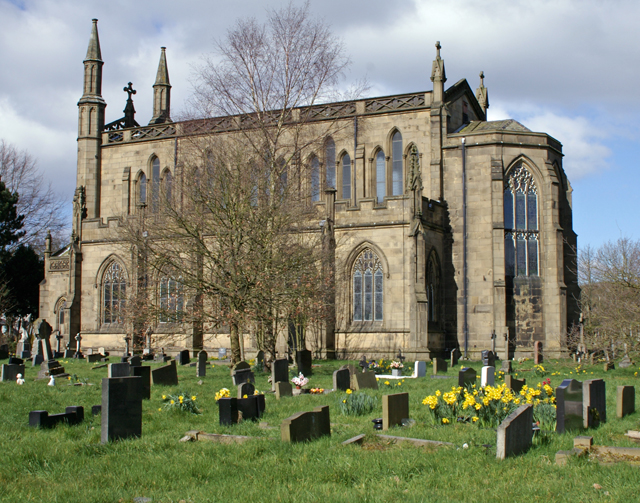
- Pleasington Priory from the southeast

- Location in Blackburn with Darwen
- OS grid reference: SD 643,266
- Location: Pleasington, Lancashire
- Country: England
- Denomination: Catholic

Architecture
- Heritage designation: Grade I
- Designated: 24 November 1966
- Architect: John Palmer
- Architectural type: Church
- Style: Gothic Revival
- Groundbreaking: 1816
- Completed: 1819; 207 years ago
- Construction cost: £23,000

Specifications
- Materials: Ashlar, slate roofs

Administration
- Diocese: Salford

Pleasington Priory, or the Church of St Mary and St John Baptist, is a Catholic church in the village of Pleasington, Lancashire, England. It is recorded in the National Heritage List for England as a designated Grade I listed building. The architectural historian Nikolaus Pevsner describes it as being "an astonishing church", and the citation in the National Heritage List for England states it is an "exceptional form of Catholic chapel for the period before Emancipation".

== History ==
The church was built between 1816 and 1819 as a thank offering by John Francis Butler at a cost of £23,000 (£1.74 million as of 2025), the architect being John Palmer and the sculptor Thomas Owen.

In 2018, with the retirement of the Parish Priest Canon Kevin Kenny, Pleasington Priory ceased to be an independent parish and was joined with the neighbouring parishes of St Peter in Chains, Mill Hill, and St John Vianney, Livesey to form the new joint parish of St Oscar Romero. The Parish Priest, Fr Shaun Braiden residing at St Peter's.

== Architecture ==
=== Exterior ===
The church is built in ashlar with slate roofs. It is a large, tall church with mixed Gothic styles. Its plan consists of a five-bay nave with a clerestory, north and south aisles, and a polygonal apse. Entry to the church is at the west through a three-order portal above which are three statues on corbels. On the underside of the middle corbel is a bust of John Butler in military uniform. Above the statue is a carved arch, then a small parapet and a large rose window, and a gable with an openwork parapet surmounted by a crocketed cross. At each side of the portal is an octagonal turret with a three-stage pinnacle. Outside the turrets are offices, each with a niche containing on one side the name of the architect and on the other the sculptor. The aisles have five five-light windows and are battlemented; the clerestory has triple lancet windows and an openwork parapet. The apse has tall, five-light, Perpendicular windows. On the south side is a priest's door.

=== Interior ===
The ceiling is rib vaulted with carved bosses and there are four-bay arcades with dogtooth decoration. On each side of the altar is a carved relief, one showing the Beheading of St John, the other Mary Magdalene.

== External features ==
The churchyard contains the war graves of eight service personnel of the First World War, and nine of the Second World War.

== See also ==
- Grade I listed churches in Lancashire
- Listed buildings in Pleasington
