= North Turton =

Civil parish in Lancashire, England

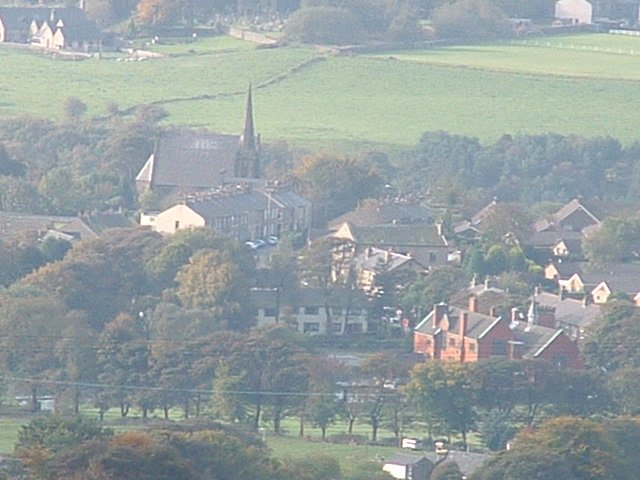
- Edgworth from Crowthorn

- Shown within Blackburn with Darwen Location within Lancashire
- Population: 3,867 (2011 Census)
- OS grid reference: SD737158
- Civil parish: North Turton
- Unitary authority: Blackburn with Darwen
- Ceremonial county: Lancashire
- Region: North West
- Country: England
- Sovereign state: United Kingdom
- Post town: BOLTON
- Postcode district: BL7
- Dialling code: 01204
- Police: Lancashire
- Fire: Lancashire
- Ambulance: North West
- UK Parliament: Rossendale and Darwen

North Turton is a civil parish of the unitary authority area of Blackburn with Darwen in Lancashire, England. According to the United Kingdom Census 2001 the civil parish has a population of 3,736, increasing to 3,867 at the 2011 Census. North Turton is the northern part of the historic area of Turton. Created by the Local Government Act 1972, the area is administered by Blackburn with Darwen Borough Council and North Turton Parish Council.

== Geography and administration ==
=== Landscape ===
North Turton is in the West Pennine Moors, between Blackburn in the north and Bolton to the south.

=== Delph Reservoir ===
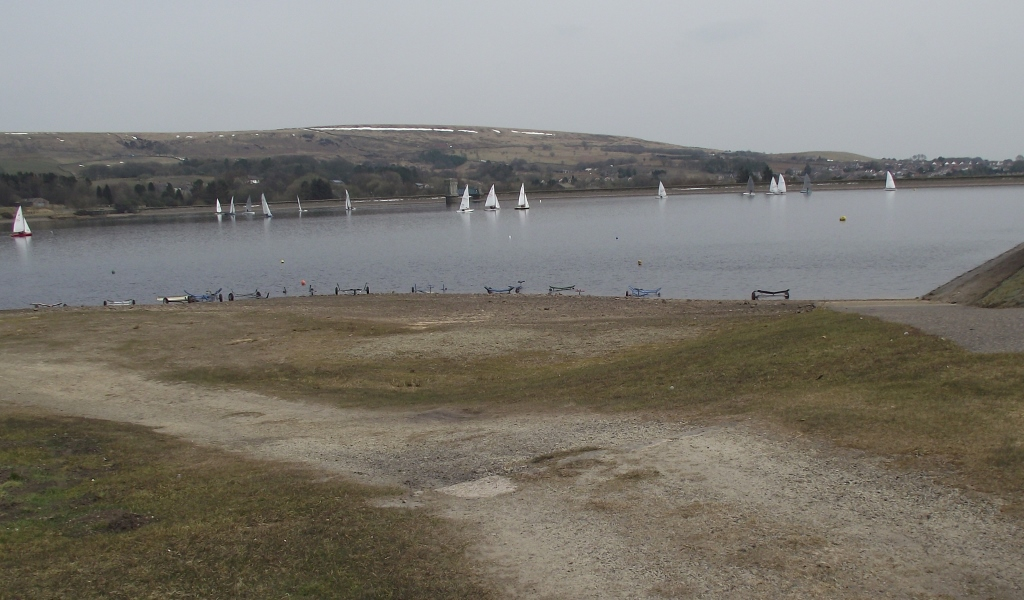
Sailing on Delph Reservoir

Delph Reservoir (53°38′09″N 2°27′18″W) is in the civil parish, in the valley of Delph Brook. It sits above the village of Egerton. The reservoir, which was officially opened on 14 July 1921, was constructed by John Best & Sons from Edinburgh. The reservoir is the home of Delph Sailing Club, which was established in 1962. The reservoir is currently owned and operated by United Utilities.

=== Civic history ===
North Turton was created in 1974 from the rural part of the former Turton Urban District. Within this civil parish there are three villages, Edgworth, Chapeltown, Belmont, and several hamlets, including Entwistle and Quarlton.

== Transport ==
=== Roads ===
There are three main roads that cross North Turton: the A666 (Blackburn Road), the A675 (Belmont Road), and the B6391 (Chapeltown Road).

=== Railways ===
There is an infrequent railway commuter service at Entwistle railway station which is served by Northern, which operate services on the Ribble Valley Line. There was a second, Turton and Edgworth railway station but was closed in the 1960s by the Beeching cuts.

== See also ==
- Listed buildings in North Turton
