= Chapeltown, Lancashire =

Village in Lancashire, England

Coordinates: 53.637°N 2.404°W

Chapeltown
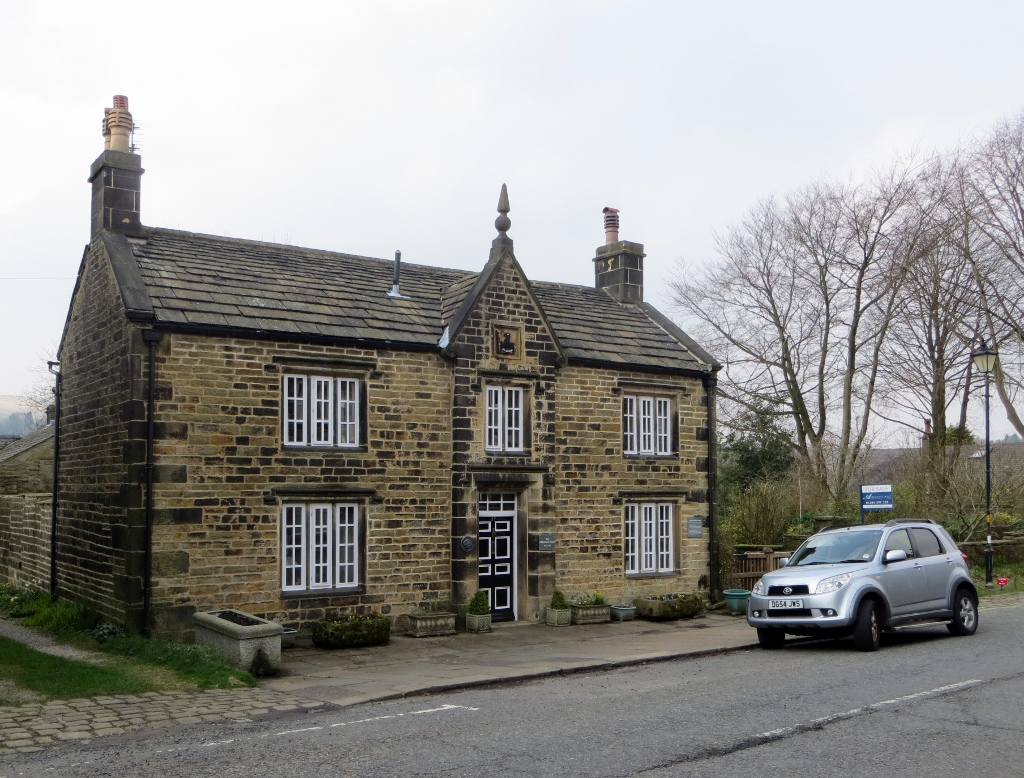
- Old School House

- Shown within Blackburn with Darwen Location within Lancashire
- OS grid reference: SD733157
- Civil parish: North Turton
- Unitary authority: Blackburn with Darwen
- Ceremonial county: Lancashire
- Region: North West
- Country: England
- Sovereign state: United Kingdom
- Post town: BOLTON
- Postcode district: BL7
- Dialling code: 01204
- Police: Lancashire
- Fire: Lancashire
- Ambulance: North West
- UK Parliament: Rossendale and Darwen

Chapeltown is a village of the civil parish of North Turton, in the Blackburn with Darwen unitary authority, in the north west of England. It is on the B6391 road, on the southern slopes of the West Pennine Moors. The village was once the historic centre of the old Turton Urban District.

The village consists mainly of 18th- and 19th-century terraced stone cottages. The tight clustering of properties along High Street is typical of villages with medieval origins. There is a small public garden containing the old village stocks and market cross. Their timber elements have been renewed several times, but the stone bases are original.

Chapeltown is the location of St Anne's Church, Turton. Turton Tower lies to the west of the village centre. The local pub is the Chetham Arms, named after Humphrey Chetham.

Chapeltown is part of the Rossendale and Darwen constituency. Andy MacNae has been the Member of Parliament for Rossendale and Darwen since 2024.

== Photo gallery ==
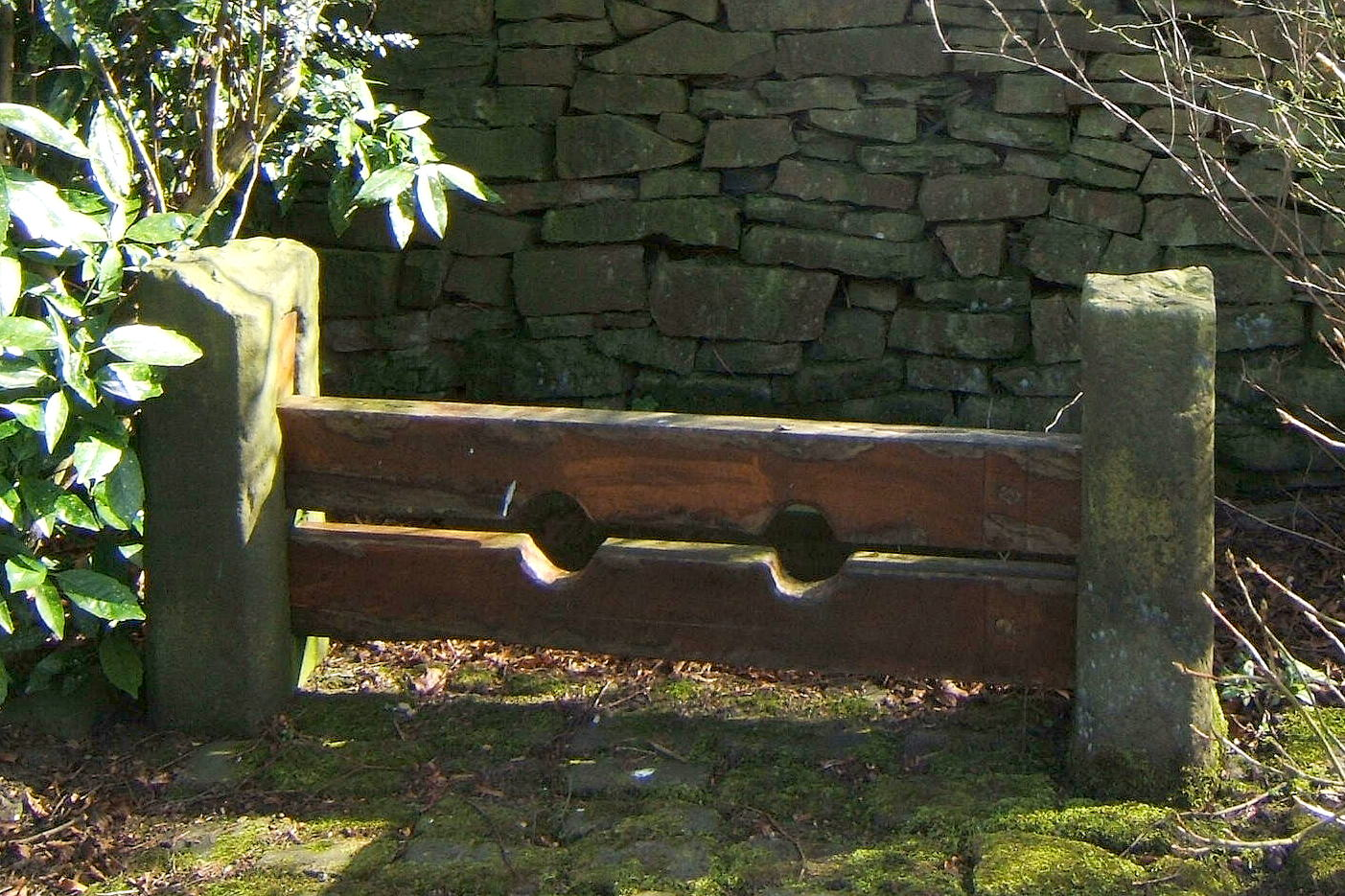
The old village stocks

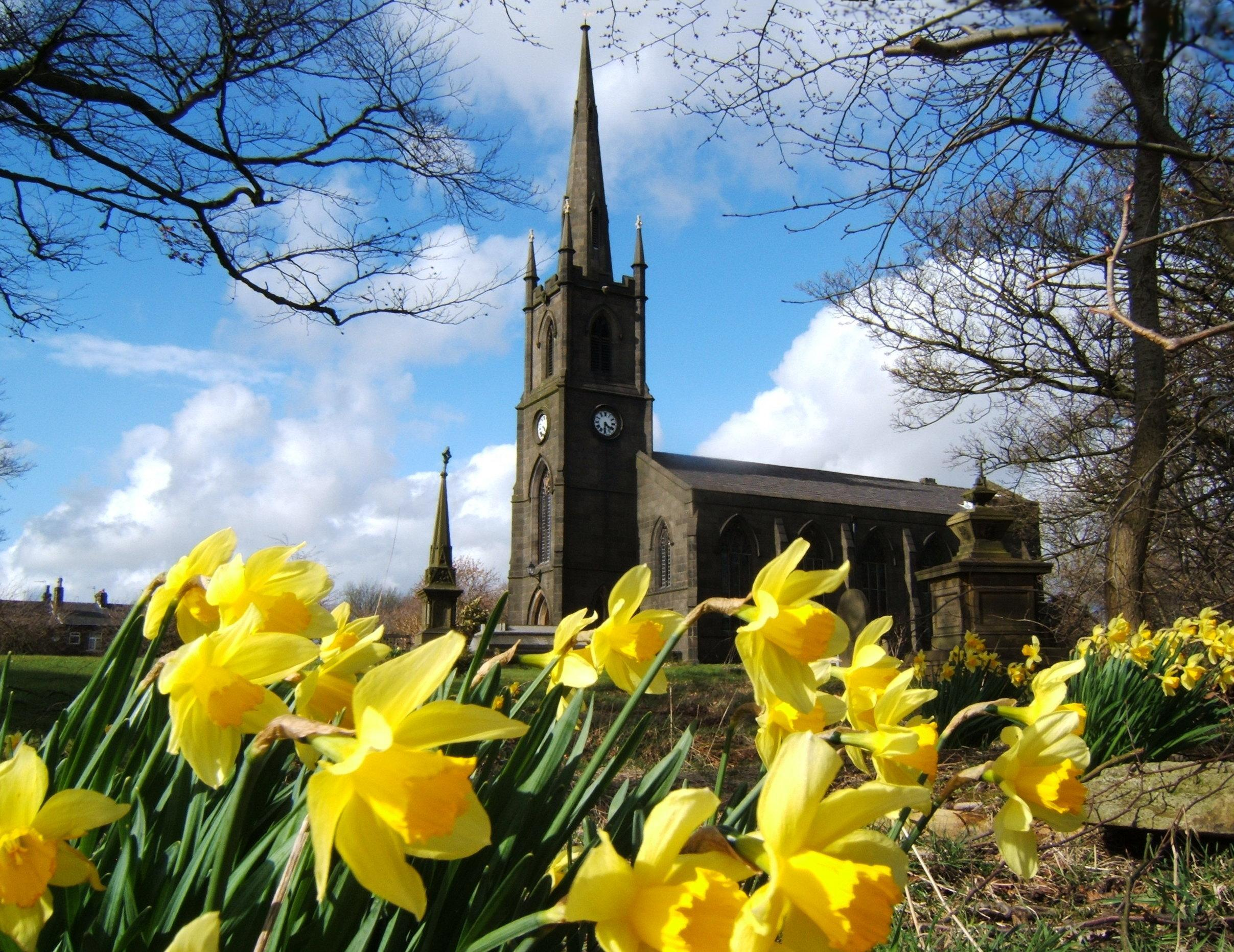
St. Anne's Church

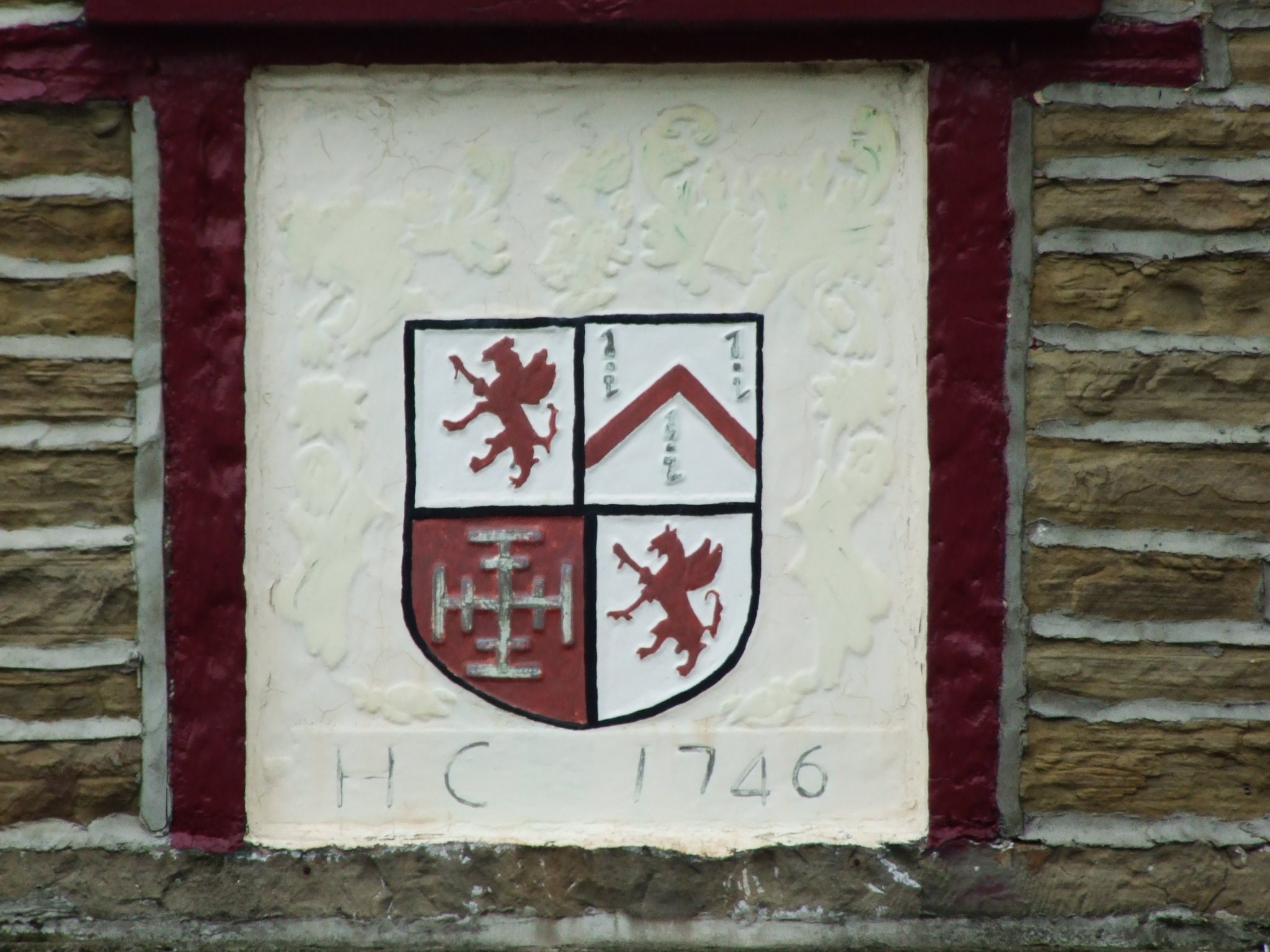
Arms of the Chetham family above the door of the Chetham Arms pub
