= James Kay (British inventor) =

British inventor (1774–1857)

James Kay (born near Entwistle, Lancashire, 1774; died Turton, Lancashire, 1857) was a British inventor who developed a successful wet spinning process for flax in 1824, helping industrialise linen spinning in the British Isles. Thus allowing it to be a great commercial success and gain a forefront position in the world. His process is still used to spin fine linen yarns, although mainly in Russia and China.

Kay was born at Edgefold Farm near Entwistle, Lancashire, and became a successful spinner with mills at Preston, Penny Bridge and Pendleton.

There were difficulties with Kay's patent application in 1825, which had been taken out for fourteen years. It seems he had been badly advised when his patent was drawn up. This resulted in the validity of his new development being disputed by John Marshall, of Leeds. Kay was forced to sue Marshall in court in 1835 for non-payment for the use of his patent, but the defendants disputed the validity of the patent on the grounds that so far as the invention was new it was useless (maceration process), and that so far as it was useful it was not new (spinning process with 2½ inch ratch). In 1839, the Court found that as the patent was taken out for an invention consisting of two parts, one of which was not new (considered too similar to the patent of Horace Hall), the whole was found void. Kay also failed in his 1841 appeal.

It was possibly as a result of the court cases, and the surrounding controversy, that he failed to get any real recognition for what he did. Which was at the very least to make an adaption and market the new device in such a way as to give British industry the confidence to use it.

Kay died at Turton Tower, Turton, Lancashire, on 10 February 1857.

A recent industrial biography describes the development of his flax wet spinning process, his mills and his patent dispute with James Marshall.
