= John Palmer (architect) =

John Palmer (28 January 1785 – 23 August 1846) was an English architect who practised in Manchester. He was buried in the graveyard of St. Augustine's Chapel, which he had designed.

== Some works ==
- Manchester Cathedral alterations (1814-1815)
- Pleasington Priory, Lancashire (1816–19)
- St Peter's Chapel, Blackburn (1819–22)
- St Augustine's Chapel, Manchester (1820)
- Blackburn Cathedral (1820-1826)
- St Mary's Chapel, Dukinfield (1825), demolished in 1847
- St Anne's Church, Turton, Lancashire (1840–41)
