= Humphrey Chetham =

English textile merchant, financier and philanthropist (1580–1653)

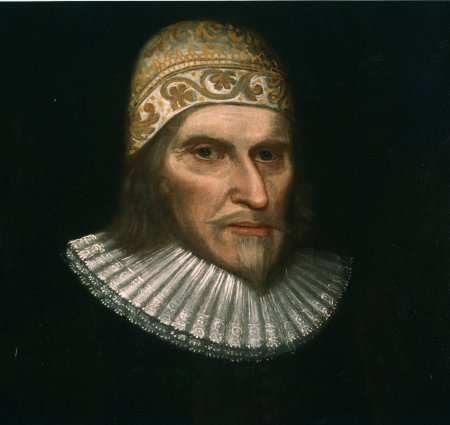
- Portrait of Humphrey Chetham, now in the library reading room
- Born: 10 July 1580; Crumpsall, Lancashire, England
- Died: 1653 (aged 72–73); Lancashire, England
- Education: Manchester Grammar School
- Occupations: Merchant; Financier; Philanthropist
- Known for: Creation of Chetham's Hospital and Chetham's Library

Humphrey Chetham (10 July 1580 – 20 September 1653) was an English textile merchant, financier and philanthropist, responsible for the creation of Chetham's Hospital and Chetham's Library, the oldest public library in the English-speaking world.

== Life ==
Chetham was born in Crumpsall, Lancashire, England, the son of Henry Chetham, a successful Manchester merchant who lived in Crumpsall Hall and his wife, Jane (c.1542–1616), the daughter of Robert Wroe of Heaton. He was educated at Manchester Grammar School, and in 1597 was apprenticed to Samuel Tipping, a Manchester linen draper.

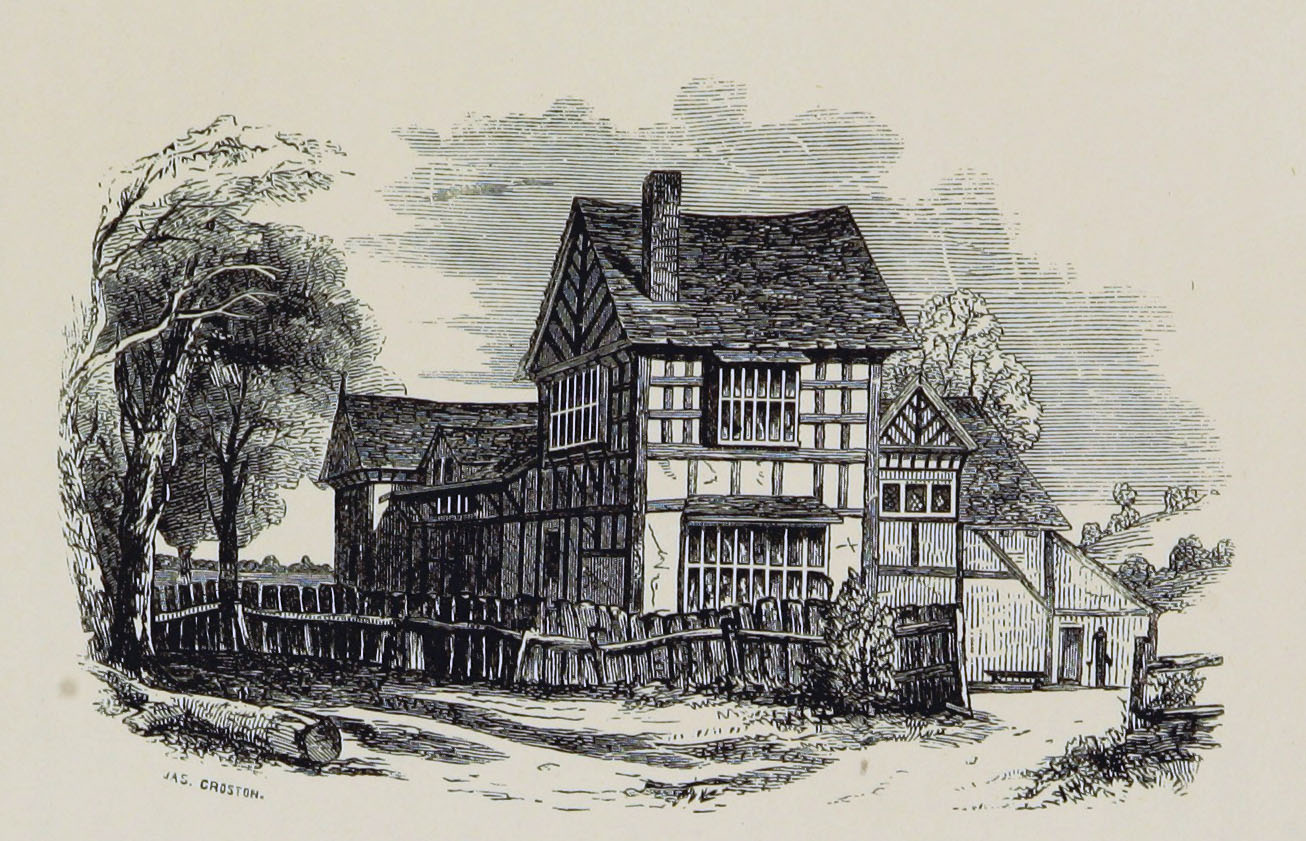
Crumpsall Hall, The Birthplace of Humphrey Chetham

In 1605, he moved to London with his brother George and set up a partnership with him trading in various textiles. The business was successful, since the fabric was bought in London and sold for a higher price in Manchester. He acquired Clayton Hall in Manchester as his home, and in 1628 was also able to buy Turton Tower from William Orrell.

In 1631, he was asked to be knighted after his huge wealth became known to the Crown, but he declined the honour, and so was fined. In 1635, he became the High Sheriff of Lancashire , a job he was unable to refuse, and in 1643 he was forced into the position of General Treasurer of Lancashire, which he found very difficult for his age.

He also began to obtain debts, and he feared that on his death parliament would take his money. He therefore donated money to form a blue coat school for forty poor boys, which later became Chetham's Hospital and then Chetham's School of Music. He also left money to establish Chetham's Library, including funds to pay for books. More libraries were constructed later on from this money.

Chetham died on 20 September 1653, aged 72. He was buried in the Collegiate Church of Manchester, now Manchester Cathedral.

== Legacy ==
After Chetham's death, the school and library opened. Chetham's contribution is commemorated by a statue and a window in Manchester Cathedral and by a statue and mural in Manchester Town Hall. By prior arrangement, Clayton Hall was left to the surviving nephew, George.

Chetham is also remembered in the name of the Chetham Society, a text publication society concerned with the history of North West England, founded at a meeting at Chetham's Library in 1843.

== Arms ==
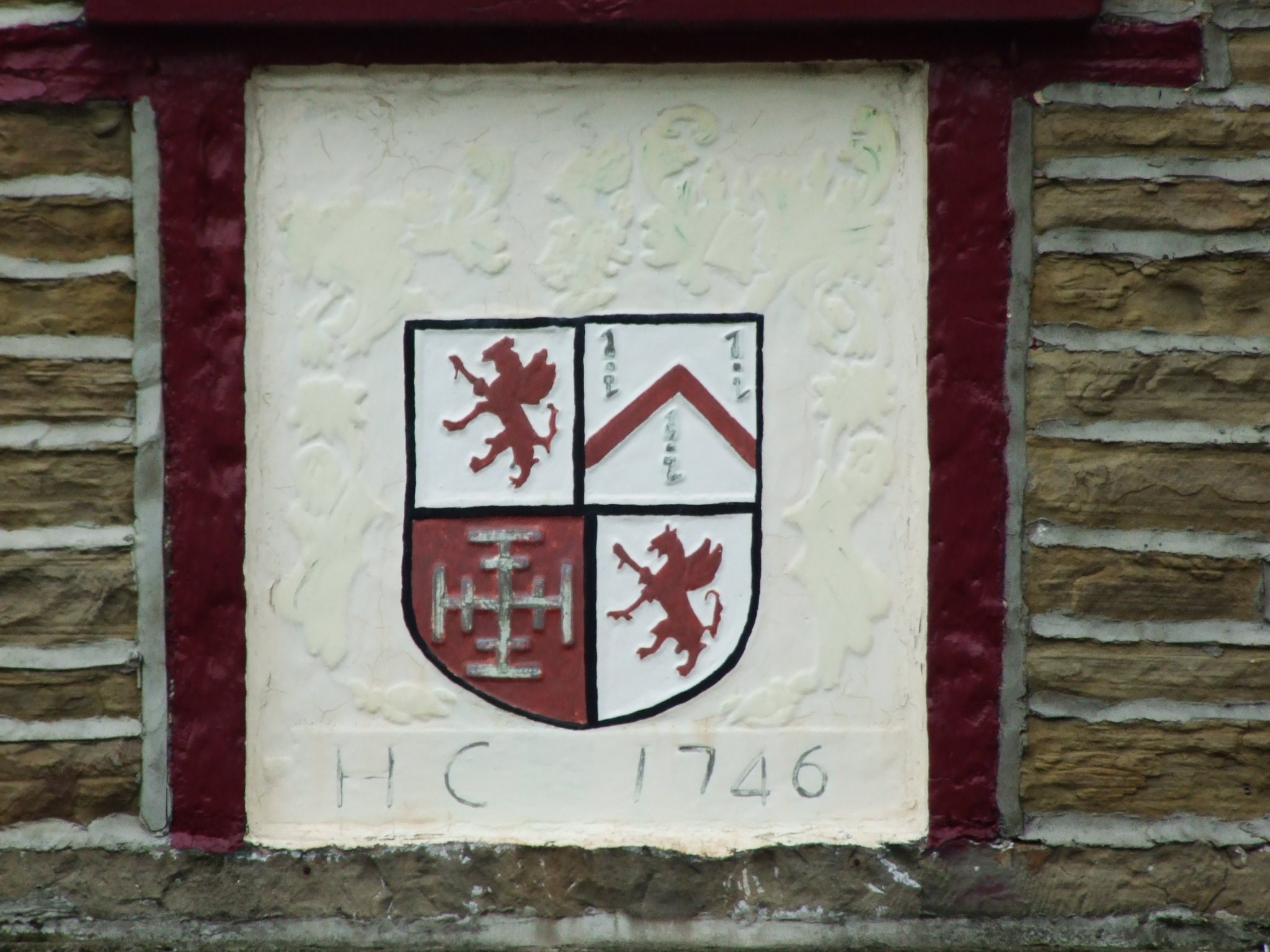
The arms of the Chetham family as displayed above the door of the Chetham Arms pub in Chapeltown

Coat of arms of Arms of Humphrey Chetham
Crest A demi-griffin Gules charged with a cross double-crossed, Or Escutcheon Quarterly, 1st & 4th, Argent, a griffin segreant Gules, within a bordure, Sable, bezanté (for Chaderton); 2nd, Argent a chevron between three cramp-irons, Gules (for Chetham); & 3rd, Gules a cross double-crossed, Or (for Prestwich), over all charged with a crescent for difference. Motto Quod tuum tene
