= Blackburn with Darwen =

Borough in England

Borough of Blackburn with Darwen
- Borough and unitary authority
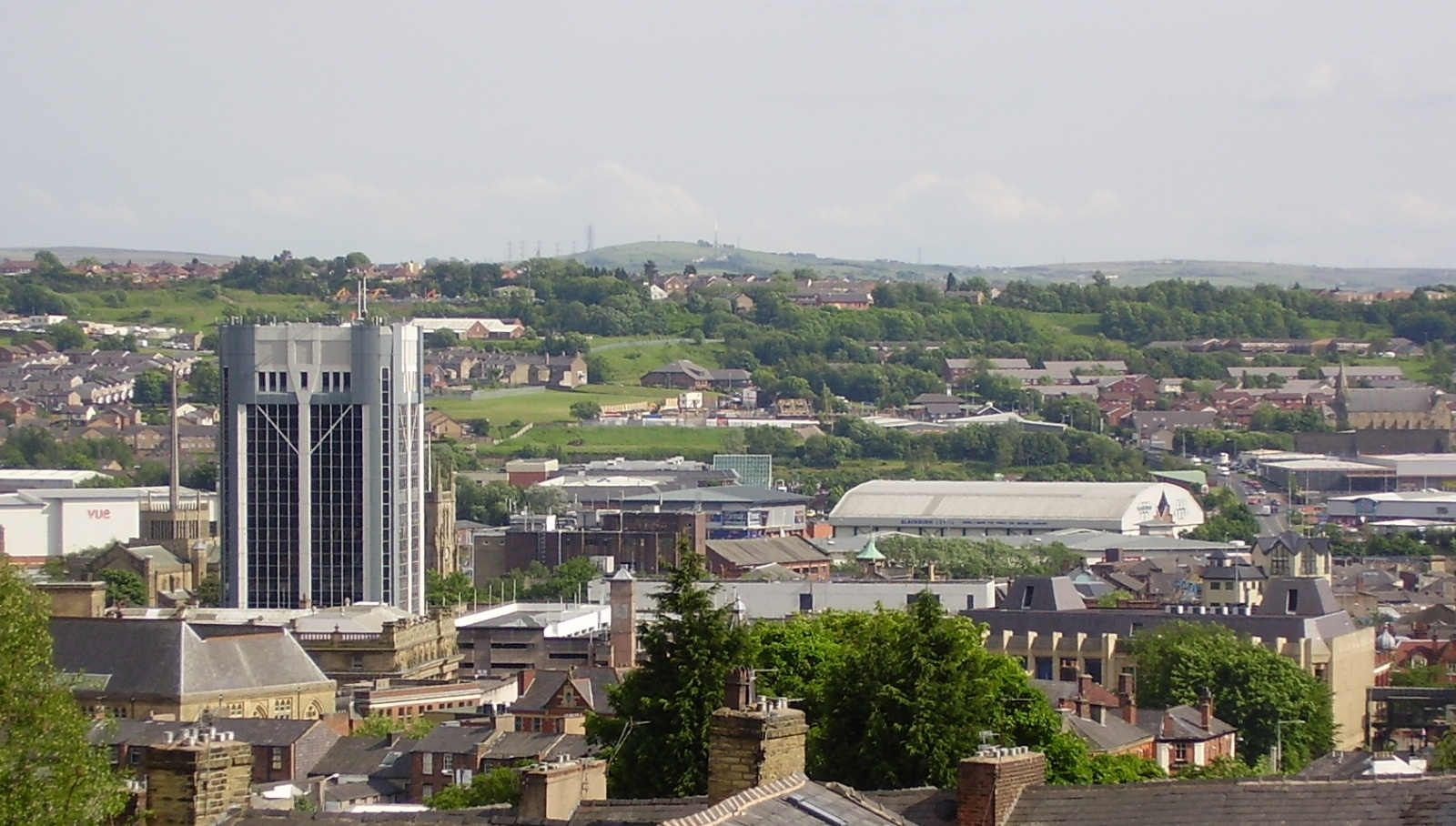
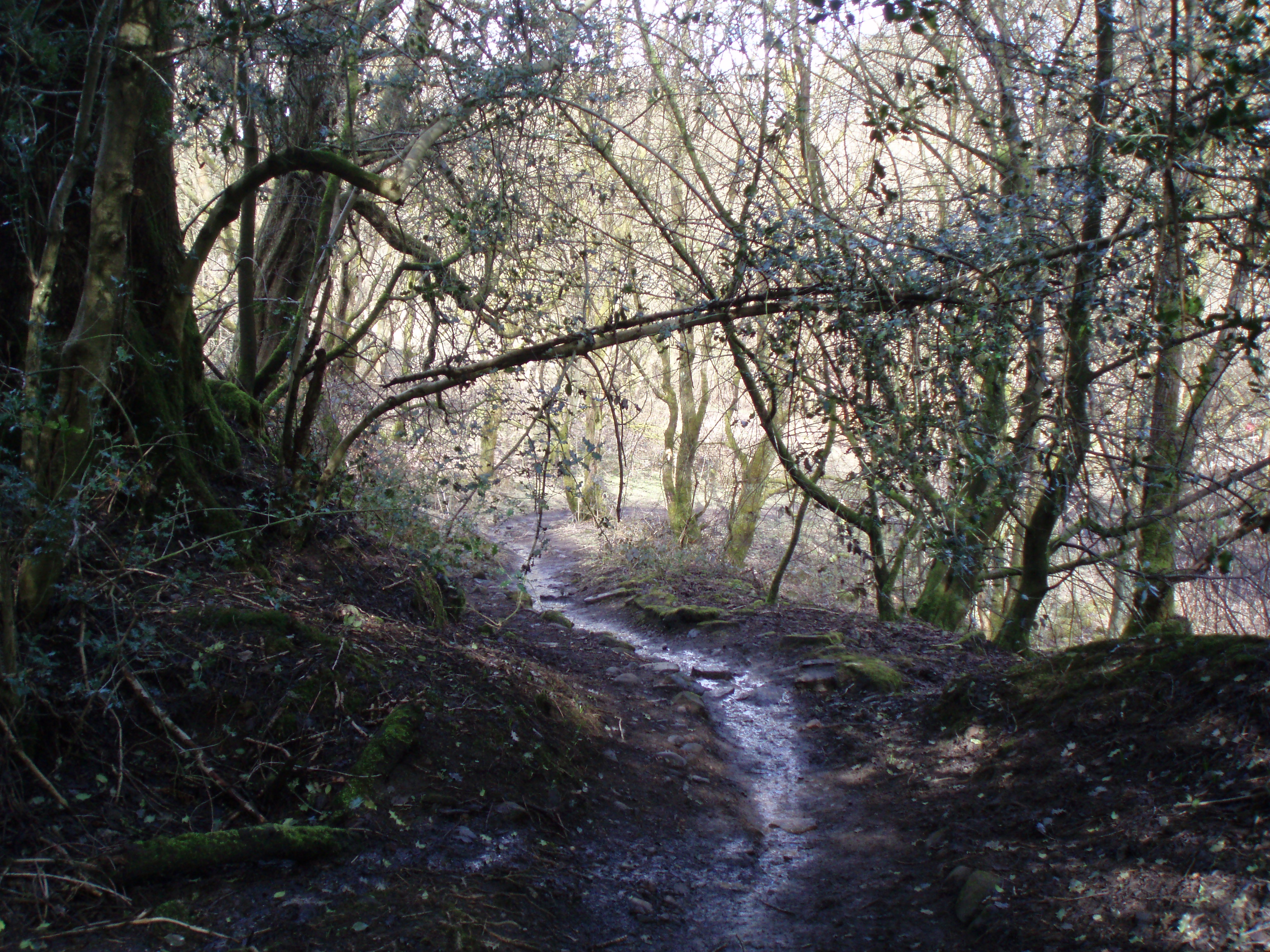
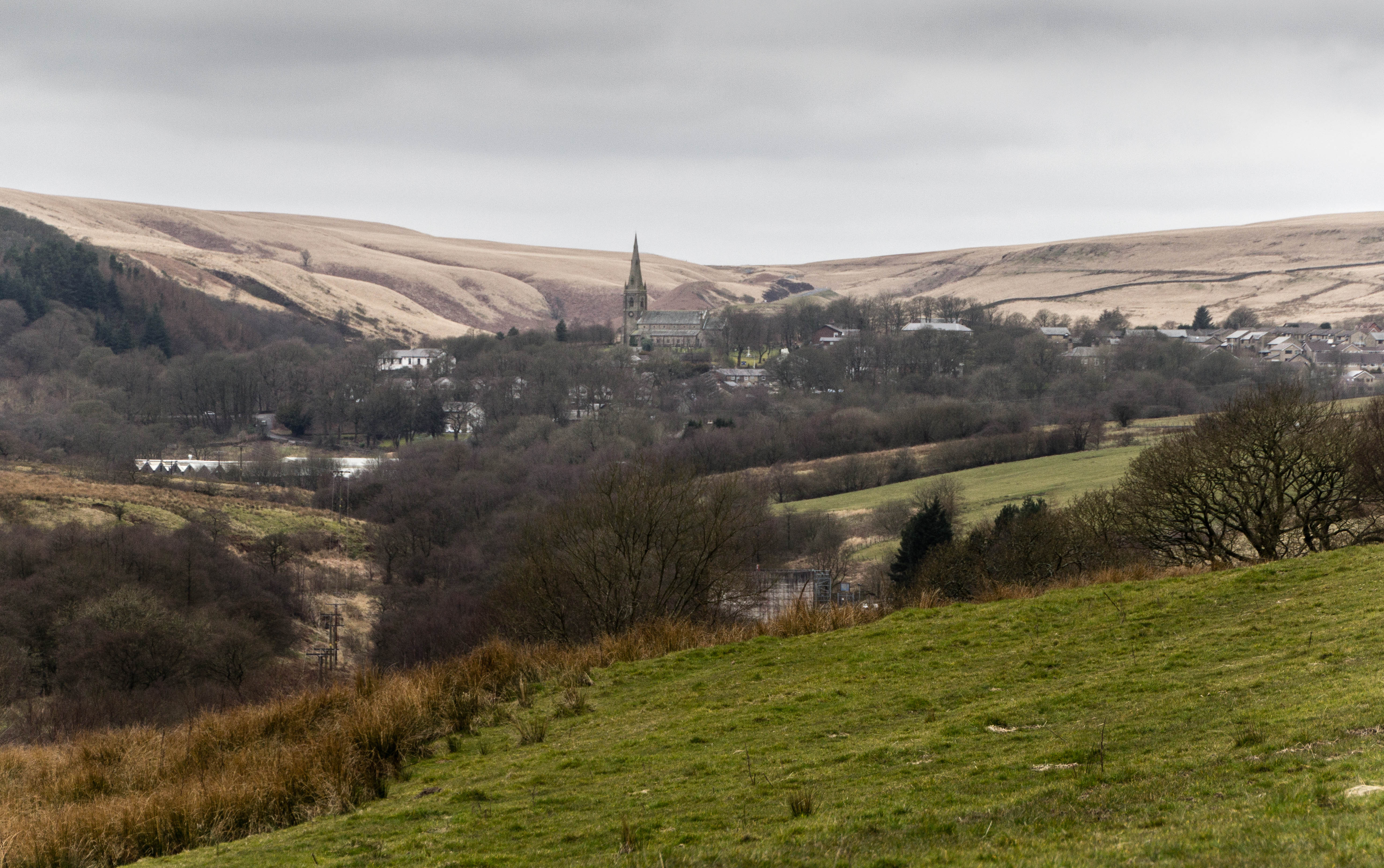
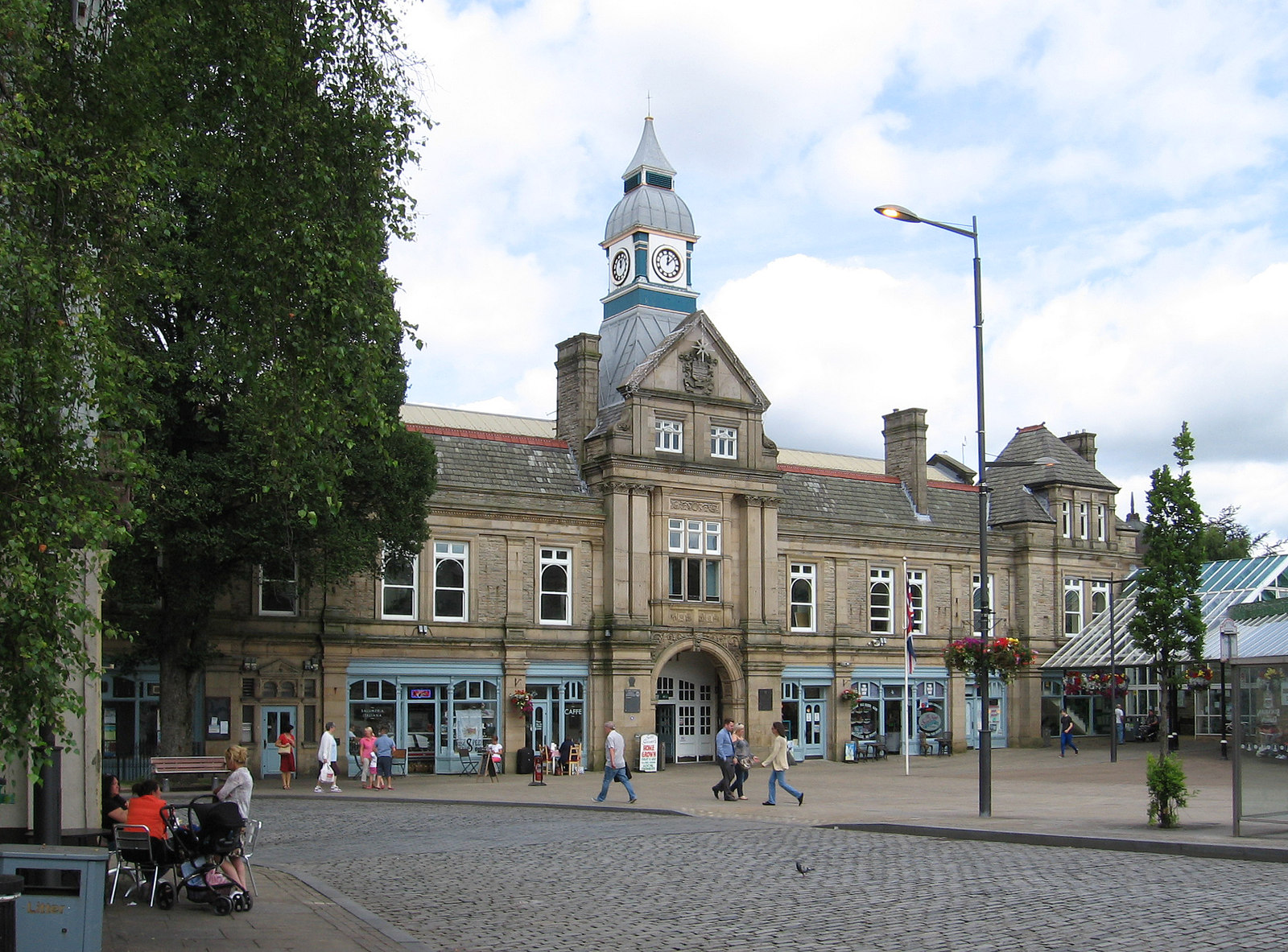
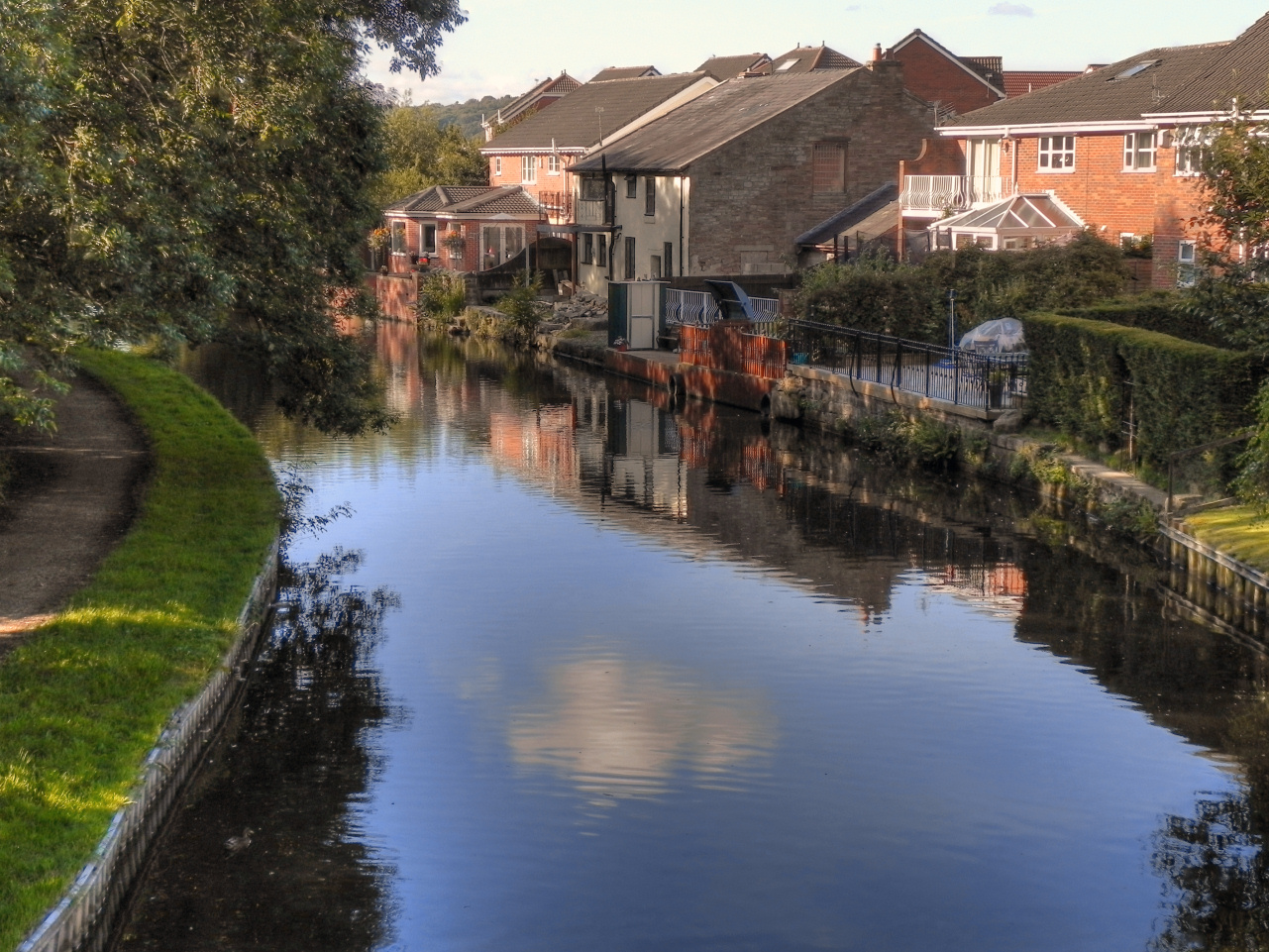
- From left to right; Top: Blackburn skyline; Middle: Entwistle Bottoms and Belmont village skyline; Bottom: Darwen Town Hall and the Leeds and Liverpool Canal in Feniscowles

- Coat of arms
- Motto: Latin: Arte et Labore, lit. 'By Skill and Labour'
- Blackburn with Darwen shown within Lancashire
- Coordinates: 53.7500°N 2.4815°W
- Sovereign state: United Kingdom
- Country: England
- Region: North West
- Ceremonial county: Lancashire
- Incorporated: 1 April 1974
- Unitary authority: 1 April 1998
- Named for: Blackburn and Darwen
- Administrative HQ: Blackburn Town Hall

Government
  - Type: Unitary authority
  - Body: Blackburn with Darwen Borough Council
  - MPs: Adnan Hussain (Ind); Andy MacNae (L)

Area
  - Total: 53 sq mi (137 km^{2})
  - Rank: 173rd

Population (2024)
  - Total: 162,540
  - Rank: 133rd
  - Density: 3,070/sq mi (1,186/km^{2})

Ethnicity (2021)
  - Ethnic groups: List: 60.4% White; 35.7% Asian; 1.7% Mixed; 0.9% Black; 1.4% other

Religion (2021)
  - Religion: List: 38.0% Christianity; 35.0% Islam; 21.1% no religion; 0.3% Hinduism; 0.2% Buddhism; 0.1% Sikhism; 0.0% Judaism; 0.3% other; 5.0% not stated
- Time zone: UTC+0 (GMT)
  - Summer (DST): UTC+1 (BST)
- Postcode areas: BB; BL; PR
- Dialling codes: 01254
- ISO 3166 code: GB-BBD
- GSS code: E06000008
- Website: blackburn.gov.uk

Blackburn with Darwen is a unitary authority area with borough status in the ceremonial county of Lancashire, North West England. The borough includes the towns of Blackburn and Darwen plus a wider rural area which includes the villages of Lower Darwen, Feniscowles, Brownhill and Hoddlesden.

== Formation ==
It was founded in 1974 as the Lancashire borough of Blackburn, from the County Borough of Blackburn, the Municipal Borough of Darwen, the parish of North Turton from Turton Urban District (chiefly the villages of Belmont, Chapeltown and Edgworth) and parts of Blackburn Rural District. It was renamed in May 1997, in preparation for a split from Lancashire County Council. On 1 April 1998 it became a unitary authority.

== Demographics ==
=== Ethnicity ===
Ethnicity of school pupils
Ethnic group	School year	
Ethnic group	2021/2022	
Ethnic group	Number	%
White: Total	12,911	46.1
White: British	11,876	42.4
White: Irish	28	0.1
White: Traveller of Irish heritage	25	0.1
White: Gypsy/Roma	21	0.1
White: Other	961	3.4
Asian / Asian British: Total	12,835	45.8
Asian / Asian British: Indian	4,592	16.4
Asian / Asian British: Pakistani	7,282	26.0
Asian / Asian British: Bangladeshi	290	1.0
Asian / Asian British: Chinese	71	0.3
Asian / Asian British: Other Asians	600	2.1
Black / Black British: Total	344	1.2
Black: Caribbean	13	0.0
Black: African	274	1.0
Black: Other Blacks	57	0.2
Mixed / British Mixed	1,129	4
Other: Total	474	1.7
Unclassified	290	1.0
Total:	27,983	100.0

=== Religion ===
According to the 2021 census, 38.0% of the population was Christian, 35.0% Muslim, 0.3% Hindu, 0.2% Buddhist, 0.4% followed another religions (including Judaism, Sikhism and others), 21.1% were not affiliated to a religion and 5.0% did not state their religious views.

Religion in Blackburn with Darwen as of 2021
1. Christianity (38.0%)
2. Islam (35.0%)
3. Hinduism (0.30%)
4. Buddhism (0.20%)
5. Sikh (0.10%)
6. No religion (21.1%)
7. Not stated (5.00%)
8. Other (0.30%)

== Governance ==
The council is based at Blackburn Town Hall on King William Street in the centre of Blackburn. As a unitary authority, Blackburn with Darwen Borough Council provides most local government services. Parts of the borough are covered by civil parishes, which provide a lower tier of local government.

== Economy ==
This is a chart of trend of regional gross value added of Blackburn with Darwen at current basic prices published (pp. 240–253) by Office for National Statistics with figures in millions of British Pounds Sterling.

Year	Regional Gross Value Added (Note: Components may not sum to totals due to rounding)	Agriculture (Note: includes hunting and forestry)	Industry (Note: includes energy and construction)	Services (Note: includes financial intermediation services indirectly measured)
1995	1,496	3	755	737
2000	1,597	3	678	916
2003	1,785	4	647	1,134

== Settlements ==
Towns, suburbs, villages and hills in the Borough of Blackburn with Darwen

=== Civil parishes ===

1. Darwen (town council)
2. Eccleshill
3. Livesey
4. North Turton
5. Pleasington
6. Tockholes
7. Yate and Pickup Bank

The town of Blackburn and the village of Hoddlesden lie in unparished areas.

== Education ==
As a unitary authority, Blackburn with Darwen authority has a statutory responsibility for educational standards and schooling within its boundaries.

== Transport ==
Blackburn with Darwen Council has a stated transport policy of "making roads traffic free".

== Freedom of the Borough ==
The following people and military units have received the Freedom of the Borough of Blackburn with Darwen.

=== Individuals ===
- Barbara Castle: 23 November 1979.
- Sir Charles Fletcher-Cooke: 23 November 1979.
- Tom Taylor, Baron Taylor of Blackburn: 2 April 1992.
- Jack Straw: 1 October 2015.

=== Military Units ===
- The East Lancashire Regiment: 5 February 1948.
- The Lancashire Regiment: 6 November 1958.
- The Queen's Lancashire Regiment: 25 March 1970.
- The Duke of Lancaster's Regiment: 1 July 2006.

== See also ==
- Blackburn with Darwen Teaching Primary Care Trust
