= Harper Green =

Coordinates: 53.554°N 2.416°W

- Location within Greater Manchester
- OS grid reference: SD725065
- Metropolitan borough: Bolton
- Metropolitan county: Greater Manchester
- Region: North West
- Country: England
- Sovereign state: United Kingdom
- Post town: BOLTON
- Postcode district: BL3, BL4
- Dialling code: 01204
- Police: Greater Manchester
- Fire: Greater Manchester
- Ambulance: North West
- UK Parliament: Bolton South and Walkden

Harper Green is an area of Farnworth in the Metropolitan Borough of Bolton in Greater Manchester, England. Historically in Lancashire, it lies 2.5 miles (4.0 km) southeast of Bolton town centre and 12.7 miles (20.4 km) northwest of Manchester city centre. Harper Green gives its name to one of the twenty electoral wards of Bolton Metropolitan Borough Council.

== History ==
Harper Green takes its name from a local yeoman family called Harpur whose holdings were in that area. Most of Harper Green is now covered by modern housing leaving no trace of the original green. In all probability the name green harks back to a bleaching green or croft when cloth was bleached by the process known as grassing. Unbleached goods were steeped in lye and laid in the sun to bleach. In the 18th century and earlier, the Harper family spelled their name Harpur and old maps show the hamlet spelled in that way.

== Governance ==
Harper Green gives its name to the larger Harper Green ward, one of the twenty electoral wards of Bolton Metropolitan Borough Council. The ward covers the western half of Farnworth, and stretches northwards to include the Royal Bolton Hospital and part of the Lever Edge area of Bolton. At the 2011 United Kingdom census, the electoral ward had a population of 14,478. Harper Green is represented in Bolton Town Hall by three elected councillors. It is also one of the eight wards which form the Bolton South East constituency and has been represented in the House of Commons by the Labour Party MP Yasmin Qureshi since 2010.

== Transport ==
Harper Green is located north of junctions 3 and 4 of the M61 motorway. The only main road through Harper Green is the B6199 (Plodder Lane).

== Education ==
In and around Harper Green, there are three primary schools: Highfield Primary School on Marsh Lane, Cherry Tree Primary School on Highfield Road, and Our Lady of Lourdes RC Primary School on Beech Avenue, and three secondary schools: Harper Green School on Harper Green Road, Mount St Joseph School on Greenland Road, and St James's CE High School on Lucas Road.

== Bibliography ==
- Billington, W.D. (1982). From Affetside to Yarrow. Egerton: Ross Anderson Publications. pp. 39–40. ISBN 0-86360-003-4.
