= Farnworth =

Town in Greater Manchester, England

Coordinates: 53.5452°N 2.3999°W

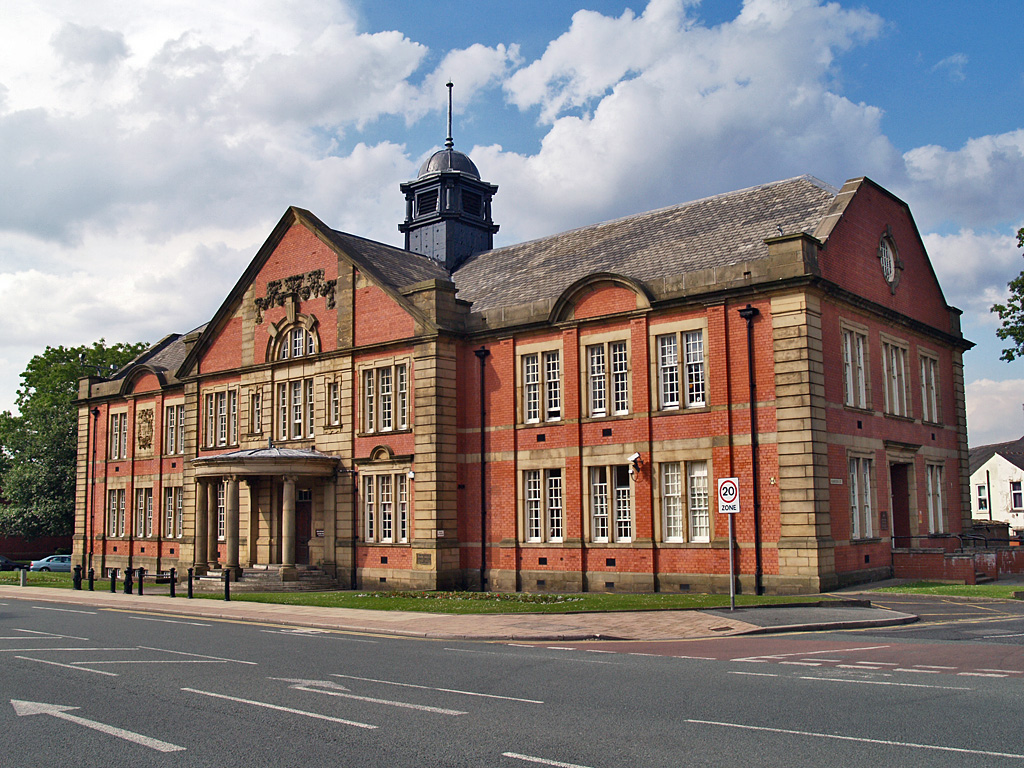
- Farnworth Town Hall

- Location within Greater Manchester
- Population: 26,939 (2011 Census)
- OS grid reference: SD7305
- Metropolitan borough: Bolton
- Metropolitan county: Greater Manchester
- Region: North West
- Country: England
- Sovereign state: United Kingdom
- Post town: BOLTON
- Postcode district: BL4
- Dialling code: 01204
- Police: Greater Manchester
- Fire: Greater Manchester
- Ambulance: North West
- UK Parliament: Bolton South and Walkden

Farnworth is a town in the Metropolitan Borough of Bolton, Greater Manchester, England, 2 miles (3.2 km) southeast of Bolton, 4 miles south-west of Bury (7 km), and 8 miles (12.9 km) northwest of Manchester.

Within the historic county of Lancashire, Farnworth lies on the River Irwell and River Croal. At the 2011 Census, it had a population of 26,939.

== History ==
=== Toponymy ===
Farnworth derives from the Old English fearn (fern) and worth (an enclosure). Farnworth was recorded as "Farneworth" and "Farnewrth" in 1278 and 1279, and "Ffornword" in a land survey of 1282.

=== Middle Ages ===
Farnworth was originally a hamlet in Barton. In the 13th century it was held by the Lords of Barton and Manchester. By 1320 Adam Lever, Richard Hulton and Richard Redford held the manor as tenants. Later the manor was acquired by the Hultons of Over Hulton. In 1666 there were 91 hearths in Farnworth liable to pay tax. The commons were enclosed in 1798. There was a watermill on the River Croal.

=== Industrial Revolution ===
The town expanded rapidly in the 18th and 19th centuries around the coal mining industry. The collieries were part of an extensive mine complex, the Worsley Navigable Levels whose underground canals stretched from the Delph at Worsley and linked the mines to the Bridgewater Canal. Other industry included iron foundries and cotton mills.

The owner of Farnworth Paper mills, T. B. Crompton, patented a continuous-drying process which contributed to the mechanisation of papermaking in 1821.

The adjoining open land of Halshaw Moor became an area for recreation for the town, hosting the annual Halshaw Moor Wakes that were described as

a saturnalia which was first celebrated in September, 1827, when bull-baiting, badger-baiting, dog fighting, cock fighting, foot racing in almost a state of nudity, grinning through a horse collar, eating a dishful of scalding hot porridge without milk and feeding themselves with their bare hands, and even the more disgusting exhibition of eating a pound of tallow candles, and stripping the wicks through their teeth for wagers, were amongst the orgies on these occasions.

== Governance ==
Lying within the boundaries of Lancashire since the early 12th century, Farnworth constituted a township and chapelry within the ecclesiastical parish of Deane. In 1837 Farnworth became part of the Bolton Poor Law Union which took responsibility for funding the Poor Law in that area. In 1863, a Local board of health was established for the township, and in 1866, it also became a separate civil parish. In 1899, under the Local Government Act 1894, Farnworth became an Urban District. In 1939, the district was granted by a charter to become the Municipal Borough of Farnworth. In 1974, under the Local Government Act 1972, the municipal borough was abolished and its area became an unparished area of the Metropolitan Borough of Bolton in Greater Manchester. Farnworth has two of Bolton Council's 20 wards, which each are represented by three councillors. At first, the wards were called Farnworth North and Farnworth South, but following name and boundary changes in 1980 the eastern side of the town is covered by the Farnworth ward and the western half side is covered by the Harper Green ward.

Under the Redistribution of Seats Act 1885, the Radcliffe-cum-Farnworth constituency was established with one Member of Parliament (MP). The constituency was abolished in 1918 with Radcliffe becoming part of the Heywood and Radcliffe constituency, and Farnworth having its own Parliament constituency. The Farnworth constituency continued until it was abolished in 1983 and became part of the Bolton South East constituency.

== Geography ==
Farnworth measures about two miles from east to west, and one from north to south with an area of 1,502 acres (608 ha) on land sloping towards the north-east by the River Croal which forms the boundary. Will Hill Brook forms the northern boundary. The underlying rocks are the coal measures of the Manchester Coalfield. Districts in Farnworth include Dixon Green and New Bury. The town has grown along the Manchester to Bolton road, the A666 and the A575 road to Worsley and Eccles. Plodder Lane, the B6199, goes west past the Royal Bolton Hospital.

== Demography ==
At the 2011 UK census, the usual resident population for Farnworth had 26,939 inhabitants, of which 13,155 (48.8%) were male and 13,784 (51.2%) were female. The 2011 census recorded a total of 11,961 dwellings in Farnworth, of which were 663 detached houses, 5,345 semi-detached houses, 3,982 terraced houses, 1,701 purpose-built flats, 168 in part of a converted or shared house (including bedsits), 102 in a commercial building, and 19 caravans (or other mobile or temporary structure).

=== Population change ===
Population changes for Farnworth since 1801

Year	Population	±%
1801	1,439	—
1811	1,798	+24.9%
1821	2,044	+13.7%
1831	2,928	+43.2%
1841	4,829	+64.9%
1851	6,389	+32.3%
1861	8,720	+36.5%

Year	Population	±%
1871	13,550	+55.4%
1881	20,708	+52.8%
1891	23,758	+14.7%
1901	25,925	+9.1%
1911	28,131	+8.5%
1921	27,894	−0.8%
1931	28,717	+3.0%

Year	Population	±%
1939	27,376	−4.7%
1951	28,616	+4.5%
1961	27,502	−3.9%
1971	26,855	−2.4%
2001	25,264	−5.9%
2011	26,939	+6.6%

== Community facilities ==
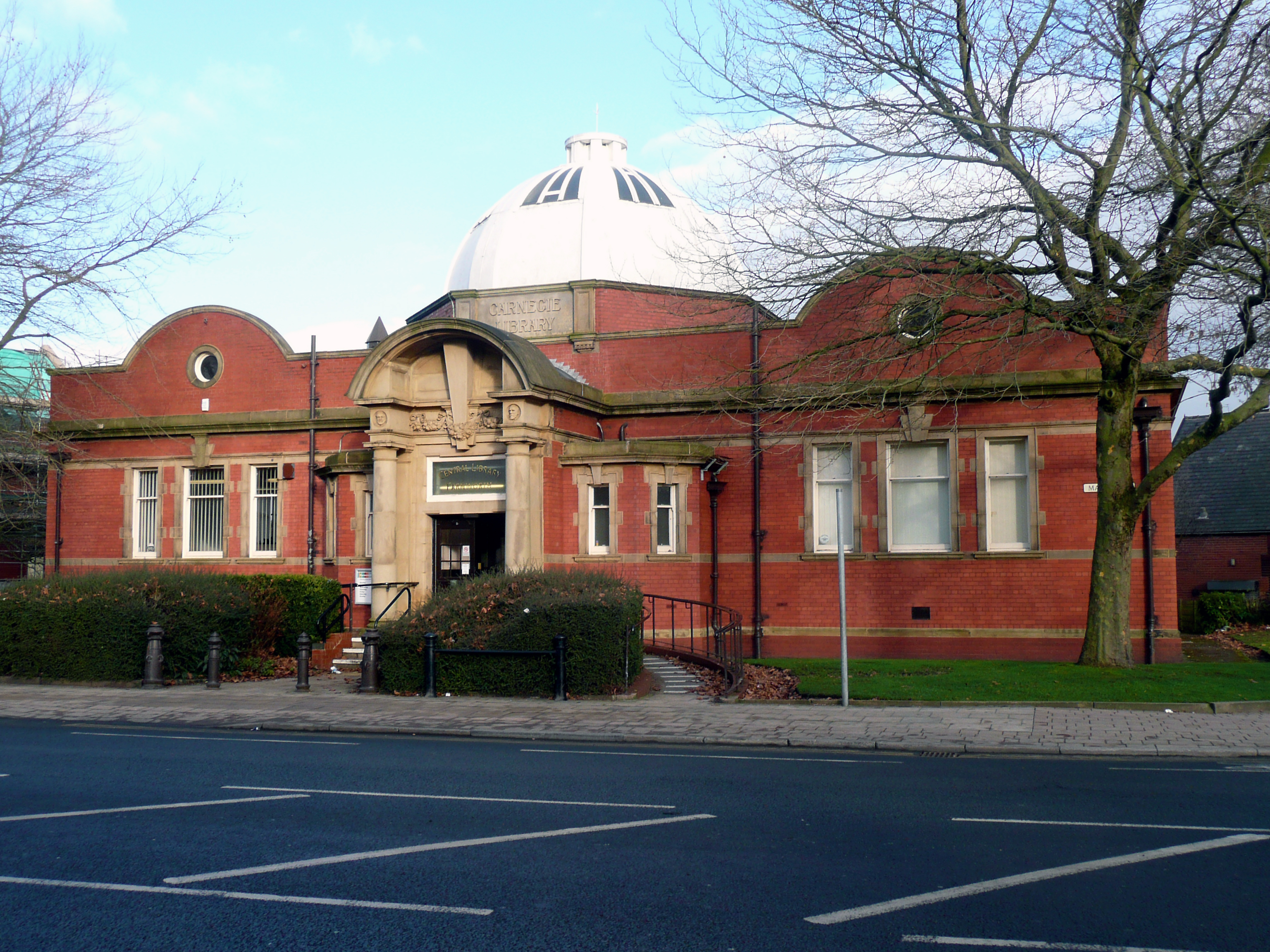
Farnworth Library

Farnworth's Carnegie Library on Market Street is one of the many Carnegie libraries in Europe established by the industrialist and philanthropist Andrew Carnegie. The library was built in 1911 and is constructed of red brick with ashlar sandstone dressings, and flat roofed areas surrounding a central dome. It was designated as a Grade II listed building on 29 September 1999 and celebrated its centenary on 11 April 2011.

Farnworth Little Theatre, established in 1948, is an amateur theatre group and is situated on Cross Street.

The town has two leisure centres. The first is Farnworth Leisure Centre with a swimming pool and is located on Brackley Street. The second one is Harper Green Community Leisure Centre and is located on Harper Green Road.

Farnworth has a number of parks and recreation grounds. The largest is Farnworth Park, close to the town centre, has undergone redevelopment as part of Bolton Council's Children's Strategy. There is also Ellesmere Park on the west side of the town centre, Bradford Street Recreation Ground in New Bury, and Doe Hey Playing Fields in Harper Green.

Royal Bolton Hospital (formerly known as the Fishpool Institution, Townleys Hospital, and Bolton General Hospital) is in Farnworth. An Emergency Department was added when Bolton Royal Infirmary in Bolton closed in the early 1990s and moved to the Farnworth site.

St Gregory's Catholic Club in Farnworth was used to film television comedy Phoenix Nights.

== Notable people ==
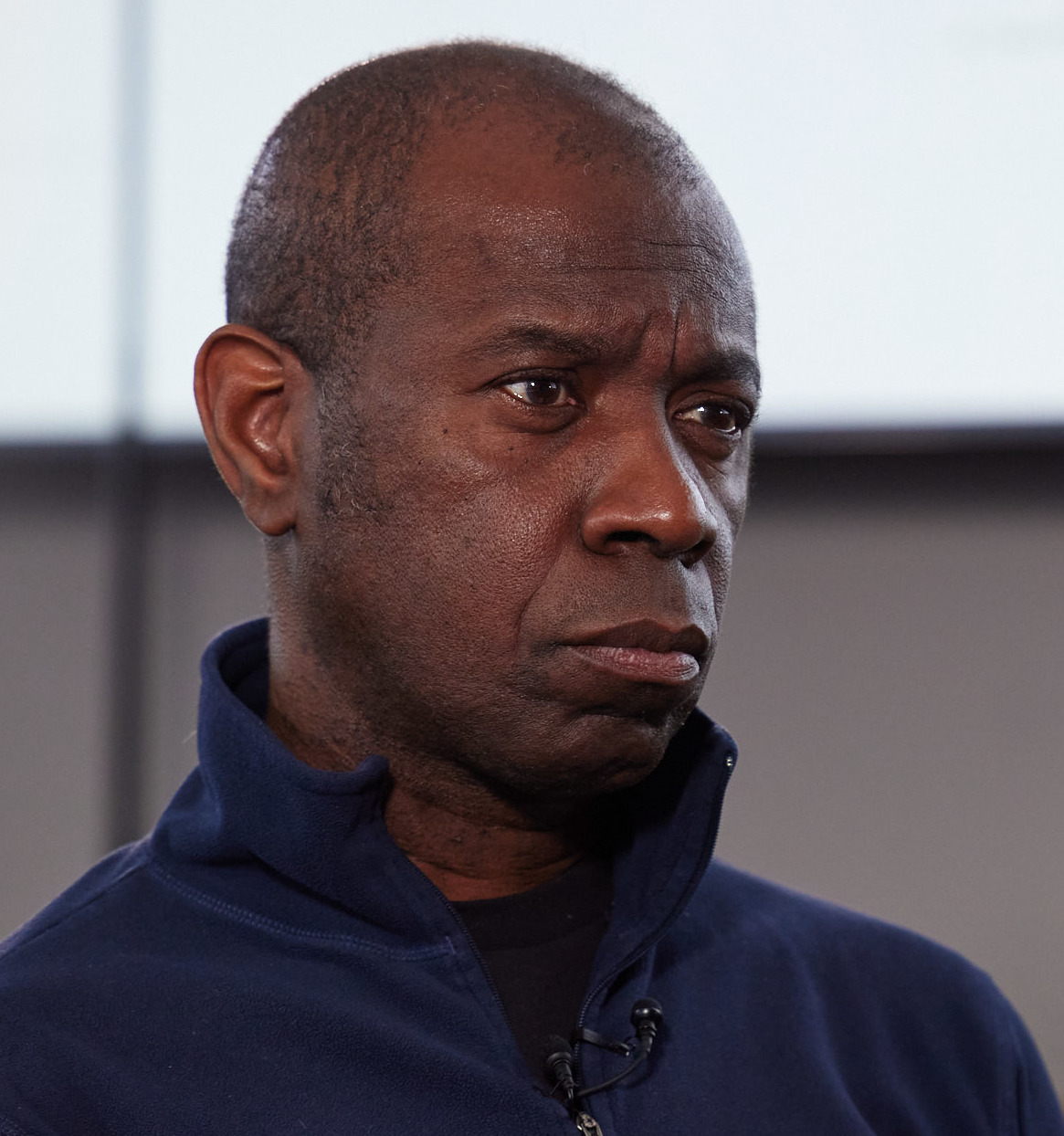
Clive Myrie, 2022

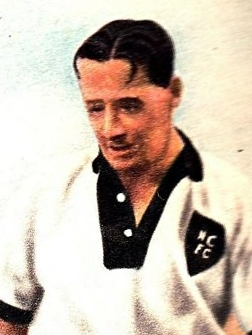
Tommy Lawton, ca.1951

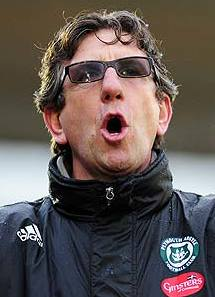
Paul Mariner, 2010

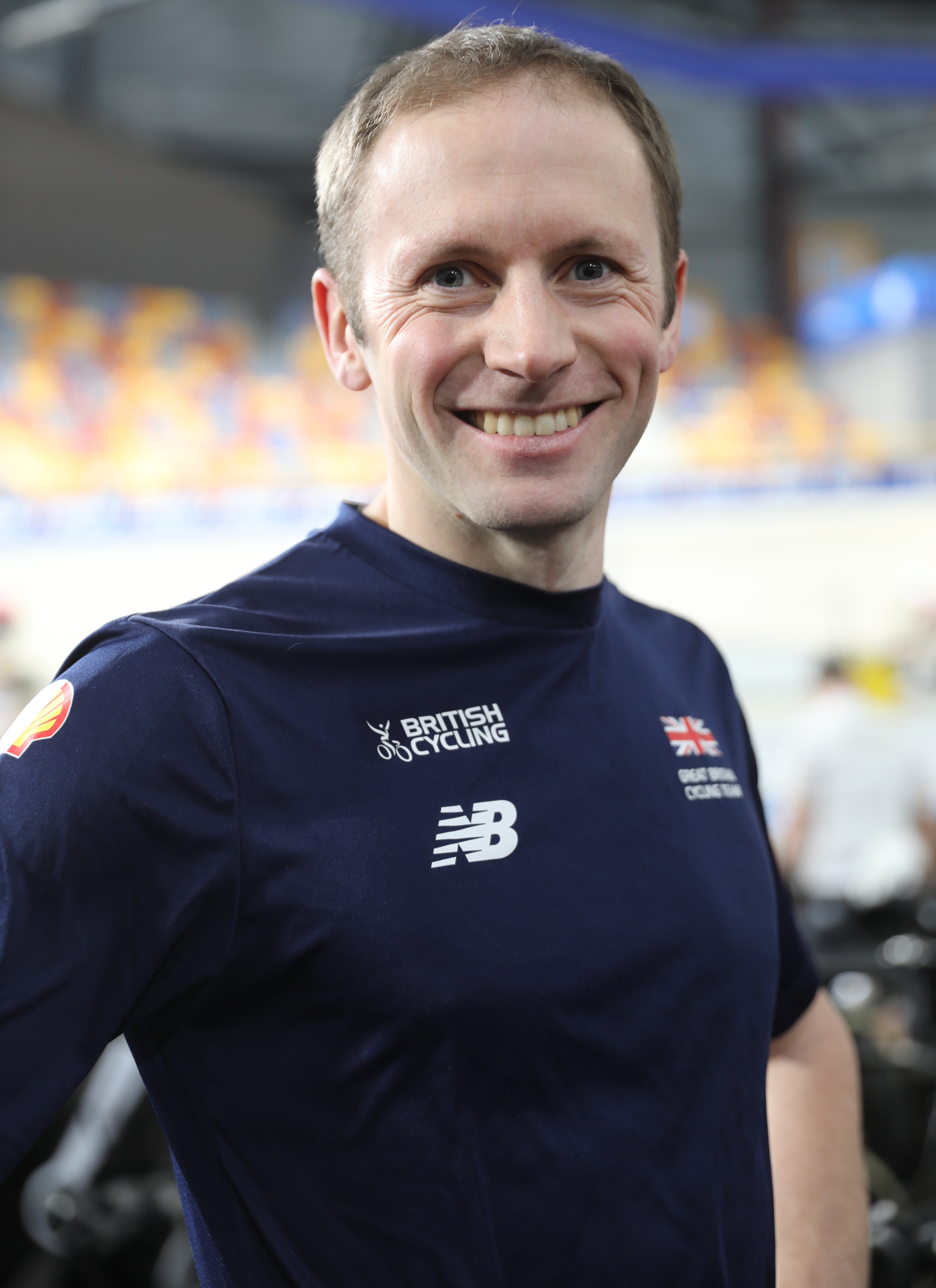
Sir Jason Kenny, 2024

- Hylda Baker (1905–1986), comedian, actress and music hall performer.
- Thomas Barnes (1812–1897), politician, MP for Bolton, and a local cotton manufacturer.
- Stephen Billington (born 1964), actor who played Greg Kelly in Coronation Street.
- Brian Chatton (born 1948), keyboardist, author and singer songwriter with Jackson Heights.
- Dorning Rasbotham (ca.1730–1791), writer, antiquarian and artist; also High Sheriff of Lancashire in 1769.
- John Fawcett (1825?–1857), was an English organist.
- Sheila Fox (1938–1944), girl aged six who disappeared locally, no trace ever found.
- Neil Gerrard (born 1942), politician, MP for Walthamstow from 1992 until 2010.
- Peter Kay (born 1973), comedian, actor, writer and director.
- Roy Lancaster (born 1937), plantsman, gardener, author and broadcaster; appears on Gardeners' World.
- Sir Donald Maclean (1864–1932), politician, MP & Leader of the Opposition between 1918 and 1920.
- Paddy McGuinness (born 1973), comedian, actor, writer, and television presenter.
- Diane Morgan (born 1975), actress, comedian and writer, known for portraying Philomena Cunk.
- Clive Myrie (born 1964), journalist, newsreader and presenter for the BBC.
- James Stones (1868–1935), politician, MP for Farnworth from 1931 to 1935.
- Simon Tong (born 1972), guitarist and keyboardist, member of The Verve between 1996 and 1999.

=== Sport ===
- Ted Goodier (1902–1967), footballer who played over 360 games
- James Halliday (1918–2007), weightlifter, bronze medallist in the lightweight at the 1948 Summer Olympics
- Tommy Lawton (1919–1996), footballer who played 420 games and 46 for England
- Tommy Banks (1929–2024), footballer who played 294 games including 233 for Bolton Wanderers
- Frank Tyson (1930–2015), cricketer who played 244 First-class cricket matches and 17 Test cricket matches
- Dave Hatton (born 1943), footballer, played 579 games including 231 for Bolton Wanderers & 251 for Blackpool
- Alan Ball Jr. (1945–2007), football player who played 833 games including 208 for Everton
- Roy Greaves (1947–2024), footballer who played 615 games including 495 for Bolton Wanderers.
- Bobby Owen (born 1947), footballer who played 409 games including 204 for Carlisle United
- Paul Mariner (1953–2021), footballer, played 555 games including 260 for Ipswich Town & 35 for England
- Barry Butler (1962–2024), footballer who played 268 games for Chester City
- Simon Barker (born 1964), footballer who played 529 games including 315 for Queens Park Rangers
- Julian Darby (born 1967), footballer who played 421 games including 270 for Bolton Wanderers.
- Karl Krikken (born 1969), cricketer who played 214 First-class cricket matches
- Jason Wilcox (born 1971), footballer, played 398 games including 271 for Blackburn Rovers
- Mike Pollitt (born 1972), football goalkeeper who played 511 games including 175 for Rotherham United
- Sir Jason Kenny (born 1988), track cyclist, has won seven Olympic gold medals, a record.

== Transport ==
Farnworth is north of junctions 3 and 4 of the M61 motorway. The main roads run through the town are the A666 (Farnworth and Kearsley By-Pass), the A575 (Egerton St/Albert Rd/Worsley Rd), the A5082 (Buckley Lane/Long Causeway), the A6053 (Bolton Rd/Market St/Manchester Rd), and the B6199 (Plodder Lane).

Farnworth and Moses Gate railway stations are served by Northern which operates services on the Manchester to Preston Line.

== Education ==
Farnworth has nine primary schools and three secondary schools. Harper Green School is home to the Alan Ball Sports Hall, as well as the Peter Kay Theatre. In 2006, Peter Kay filmed a music video at Harper Green with the Scottish band Texas.

School	Type/Status	OfSTED
All Saints' C of E Primary School	Primary	105238
Highfield Primary School	Primary	105182
Our Lady of Lourdes' RC Primary School	Primary	105245
Queensbridge Primary School	Primary	133925
St. Peter's C of E Primary School	Primary	105239
St Gregory's RC Primary School	Primary	105244
St James's C of E Primary School	Primary	105208
The Ferns Primary Academy (formerly known as Plodder Lane Primary School)	Primary	105183
The Orchards Federation (Green Fold Special School, Cherry Tree Primary School and The Orchard's Nursery)	Primary	105187
Harper Green School	Secondary	105257
Mount St Joseph School	Secondary	105263
St James's C of E School and Sports College	Secondary	105266

== Religious sites ==
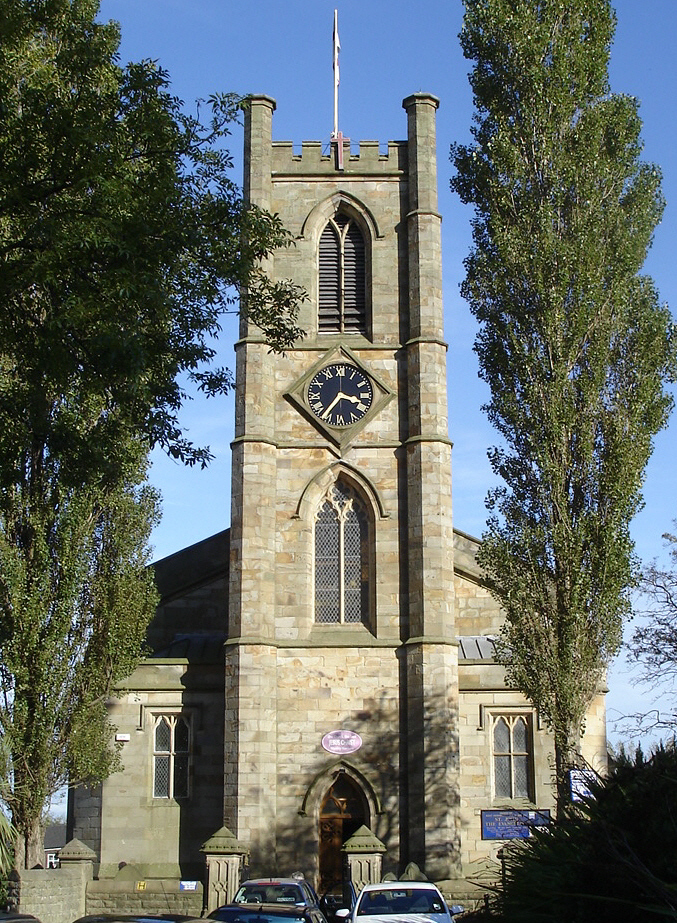
St John the Evangelist's Parish Church, Farnworth

The Anglican Diocese of Manchester has three active places of worship in Farnworth. The oldest is the Parish Church of St John the Evangelist on Church Street and was consecrated in 1826. The two other active Anglican churches in Farnworth are St Catharine's LEP Church, Highfield Road, Dixon Green, which is shared with the Methodist Church, and St George's Church, Daisy Avenue, just off Plodder Lane.

There had been other Anglican churches in the town but have closed: St Thomas' Church, Church Walk, Dixon Green, opened in 1878 and closed in 1996 but reopened by Farnworth Christian Fellowship in 2008; All Saints' Church, Moses Gate, opened in 1909 and closed c. 2007; St Peter's Church, Bradford Street, New Bury, opened in 1886, closed in 2007, and demolished in 2012; St James' Church, New Bury, opened in 1864/5 and closed in 2013.

The Roman Catholic Diocese of Salford has only one church in Farnworth, Our Lady of Lourdes' Church on Plodder Lane. There had been another, St Gregory the Great's Church on Presto Street, but it closed in 2004.

Other Christian places of worship in the town include Farnworth Christian Fellowship on Church Walk, Trinity Methodist Church on Market Street, Farnworth Baptist Church on Trafford Street, the United Reformed Church on Albert Road, and the Salvation Army Citadel on Brackley Street.

The Sughra Mosque on Granville Street, the only mosque in Farnworth, serves the Muslim community.

== Sports ==
Farnworth F.C. is a youth football club that plays its home games at Darley Park, with winter training taking place at Harper Green School.

Farnworth Cricket Club, founded in 1870, plays its home games at Bridgeman Park. It participates in the Bolton Cricket League, as do Farnworth Social Circle.

Farnworth's Harper Green playing field also hosts the home games of Bolton Hockey Club men's section.

== See also ==
- Listed buildings in Farnworth

== Bibliography ==
- Ashmore, Owen (1969), Industrial Archaeology of Lancashire, David & Charles, ISBN 0-7153-4339-4
- Mills, A. D. (1998), Dictionary of English Place-Names, Oxford, ISBN 0-19-280074-4
