= Tommy Banks (footballer) =

English footballer (1929–2024)

Personal information
- Full name: Thomas Banks
- Date of birth: 10 November 1929
- Place of birth: Farnworth, Lancashire, England
- Date of death: 13 June 2024 (aged 94)
- Place of death: Bolton
- Position: Left-back

Senior career*
Years	Team	Apps	(Gls)
1947–1961	Bolton Wanderers	233	(2)
1961–1963	Altrincham	61	(1)
1963–1967	Bangor City		
Total		294	(3)

International career
1958	England	6	(0)
- * Club domestic league appearances and goals

Thomas Banks (10 November 1929 – 13 June 2024) was an English footballer who played as a left-back.

He was born at Farnworth, Lancashire, the son of a coal miner, Jack Banks and his wife, Catherine, and attended Harper Green School. He played for Bolton Wanderers from 1947 to 1961 and was a member of the 1958 FA Cup winning team when Bolton beat Manchester United. He also played six matches for the England national team in 1958, including all four matches in the 1958 FIFA World Cup. He got his opportunity in the England team because of the death of incumbent left-back Roger Byrne in the Munich air disaster in February 1958. He made only a single appearance for England after the tournament. Banks also had a role in the fight to acquire better pay and conditions for football players in the 1961 labour dispute with the Football League. He also played non-League football for Altrincham and Bangor City.

In 2012 a biography 'Ah'm Tellin' Thee' was published written by former Bolton Wanderers player Ian Seddon.

Banks died of complications of dementia in Bolton on 13 June 2024, at the age of 94.

His recent death was acknowledged, alongside those of Kevin Campbell and Matija Sarkic, during BBC commentary on England's opening match of Euro 2024 against Serbia, where it was mentioned that Banks had been England's oldest living former player.

== Honours ==
Bolton Wanderers

- FA Cup: 1957–58
