= The Shakespeare, Farnworth =

Listed former pub in Greater Manchester, England

The Shakespeare
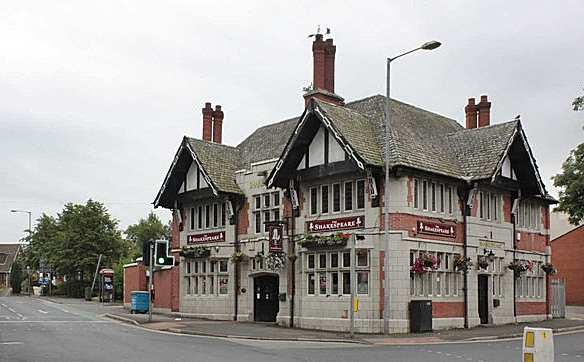
- The pub in 2012

- Location within Greater Manchester

General information
- Status: Vacant
- Type: Public house (former)
- Architectural style: Neo-Tudor
- Location: 1 Glynne Street, Farnworth, Greater Manchester, England
- Coordinates: 53.5501°N 2.4034°W
- Year built: 1926; 100 years ago
- Renovated: Late 20th century (altered)
- Closed: 2022
- Client: Magee Marshall & Co

Design and construction
- Designations

Listed Building – Grade II
- Official name: Shakespeare public house
- Designated: 13 February 2004
- Reference no.: 1390813

The Shakespeare is a Grade II listed former public house on Glynne Street in Farnworth, a town in the Metropolitan Borough of Bolton, Greater Manchester, England. Built in 1926 for Magee Marshall & Co and reputedly rebuilt following a fire, it was designed with a distinctive "calendar" theme expressed through its external features. The pub operated under various owners throughout the 20th and early 21st centuries and was recognised by the Campaign for Real Ale (CAMRA) for the national importance of its historic interior. After a period of decline, closure and changes in ownership, the building has remained vacant since 2022. A 2026 proposal to convert it into a nine‑bed HMO with a car‑sales use was refused by Bolton Council, and there have been no further updates on the site as of November 2026.

== History ==
The building was constructed in 1926 for the brewer Magee Marshall & Co of Bolton, according to its official listing. It was reportedly rebuilt following a fire, and was designed with a "calendar" theme, incorporating features said to represent the days, weeks and seasons of the year, including four external doors, four floors, seven chimneys and 365 panes of glass. The 1929 and 1939 Ordnance Survey maps mark the building as a public house with no attributed name. Minor alterations were made to the pub at some point in the late 20th century.

By May 1981 it was operating as a Greenall Whitley pub. On 13 February 2004, The Shakespeare was designated a Grade II listed building. It was included on the Campaign for Real Ale (CAMRA)'s National Inventory of Historic Pub Interiors before the inventory's grading system was revised. Under the revised scheme, it is rated three stars and its interior is regarded as being "of outstanding national historic importance".

In 2016 the pub was added to the local list of assets of community value, although this designation expired in 2021. Ownership subsequently passed from Bravo Inns to Hawthorn Leisure and then to Admiral Taverns. The pub closed on 7 April 2022, was sold later that month, and had returned to the market for auction by July 2022, having stood vacant for several years.

In March 2026, Bolton Council refused an application to convert the pub into a nine‑bed HMO with an associated car‑sales use, concluding that the scheme would harm the listed building's character and provide poor living conditions. The decision notice explained that the plans offered inadequate communal and outdoor space, raised privacy concerns for ground‑floor rooms, and were supported by an insufficient heritage assessment; officers also noted that some works had already begun without permission. A section at the back of the building is currently used for a car‑buying business, which also makes use of part of the car park. There has been no further update on the site as of November 2026.

== Architecture ==
=== Exterior ===
The building is constructed in red brick with buff terracotta detailing and a slate roof in a Neo-Tudor style. Chimneys rise from the side walls and from the centre of the roof. It stands on a corner plot with entrances on both Albert Road and Glynne Street, giving it a roughly square layout.

The Albert Road frontage has three bays and two storeys. The main doorway is set within a broad, gently arched opening and has double doors with glazed upper panels and a small window above. On either side of the entrance are large bay windows that project slightly and are divided into multiple panes. Above them, the first floor has a row of five windows with small leaded panes, all set beneath prominent timber gables. These gables project strongly from the wall and are decorated with carved bargeboards and timber supports.

The Glynne Street side has a slightly projecting central bay with its own entrance, also placed beneath a timber gable. Here the doorway is incorporated into a wide window divided into four lights. Above it is a smaller three‑light window. On either side of the entrance are broad ground‑floor windows divided into six panes, with matching six‑pane windows on the first floor above.

=== Interior ===
The main entrance on Albert Street leads directly into a central lobby used for drinking, with a bar counter and canopy. From this space, doorways open into several separate rooms, including the Commercial Room, the News Room and the Lounge Bar. These rooms keep their original fixed seating, timber panelling, decorative glass and half‑glazed doors. The Lounge and the Commercial Room both contain fireplaces with timber surrounds and overmantels, while the News Room has its own bar counter with panelled detailing and pilasters. Beside the entrance to the Commercial Room is a small off‑sales hatch enclosed by glazed and panelled woodwork.

On the first floor is a fully panelled function room. Like the Lounge, it retains bell pushes that were once used to summon waiter service.

== See also ==
- Listed buildings in Farnworth
- Listed pubs in Greater Manchester
