= Gertrude Herzfeld =

British doctor

- Born: 1 June 1890
- Died: 12 May 1981 (aged 90)
- Education: University of Edinburgh
- Known for: Paediatric and Gynaecological Surgeon

Gertrude Marian Amalia Herzfeld (1 June 1890 – 12 May 1981) was an English surgeon, one of the first female surgeons to work in Scotland and the first woman paediatric surgeon. The second female fellow of the Royal College of Surgeons Edinburgh, and the first practicing female fellow, Herzfeld chaired the Edinburgh city branch of the British Medical Association from 1960 to 1962, and was National President of the Medical Women's Federation from 1948 to 1950.

== Early life ==
Herzfeld was born in Hampstead, London, in 1890; her parents were Jewish immigrants from Austria. After being educated in London, she studied medicine at the University of Edinburgh, qualifying in 1914 with an MB ChB degree. She was to spend much of her professional career in Edinburgh. Herzfeld's early career was marked by her appointment as house surgeon to Sir Harold Stiles at the Royal Edinburgh Hospital for Sick Children and the Chalmers Hospital shortly after qualifying, making her the first woman to hold the post.

== Career ==
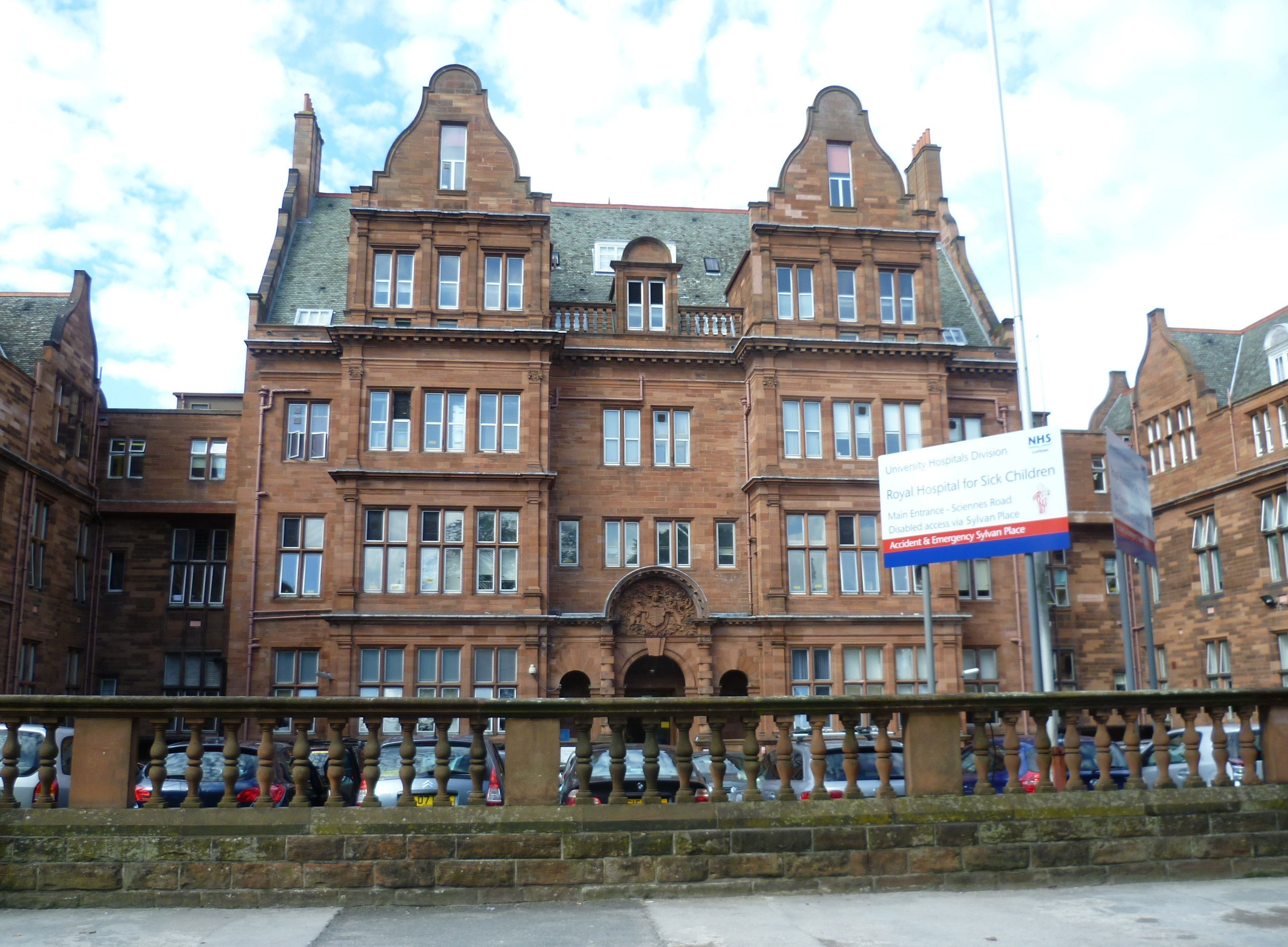
Royal Edinburgh Hospital for Sick Children, where Herzfeld worked from 1920 to 1945

After the House Surgeon post at the Royal Hospital for Sick Children, Herzfeld left Edinburgh to become a surgeon attached to the RAMC Cambridge Hospital, Aldershot in 1917. From 1917 to 1919, she was senior house surgeon at Bolton Royal Infirmary, before returning to Edinburgh in 1920. That year also saw Herzfeld take up several concurrent appointments. She became a consultant surgeon at the woman-run Bruntsfield Hospital for Women and Children, a position that she held until 1955. She was appointed as the first female honorary assistant surgeon at the Royal Edinburgh Hospital for Sick Children, where she would serve until 1945 after becoming a full surgeon there in 1925. 1920 was also the year that Herzfeld took her seat as a Fellow of the Royal College of Surgeons Edinburgh, the second woman to be admitted two months after Alice Mabel Headwards Hunter who did not take her seat and the first female fellow to practise.

Throughout her career, Herzfeld was also a surgeon to the Edinburgh Orthopaedic Clinic (1925–1955) and a lecturer on childhood surgery at the University of Edinburgh. She helped found the Edinburgh School of Chiropody, where she was also a lecturer, and served as a medical advisor to the Edinburgh Cripple Aid Society and to the Trefoil School for Physically Handicapped Children. Having joined the British Medical Association in 1915, Herzfeld became the chair of the Edinburgh city branch from 1960 to 1962. She also sat as the National President of the Medical Women's Federation from 1948 to 1950. Her surgical career was marked by her contributions to the emerging field of paediatric surgery, which at the time encompassed plastic, orthopaedic, and abdominal procedures, as well as neonatal work. She was a particularly welcome presence at the Royal Hospital for Sick Children, Edinburgh, where she was affectionately known by the nickname 'Gertie'.

=== Outpatient surgery ===
Early in her career, Herzfeld worked as house surgeon to Harold Stiles, who had developed the first modern treatment for infants with inguinal hernia in 1910. This procedure was one which Herzfeld was to become a great advocate for, and was to put her amongst a small group of surgeons who were at the forefront of outpatient surgery long before it became routine. Due to a lack of hospital beds, Stiles' procedure was frequently performed in the outpatient department, which also allowed infants to continue breastfeeding after the surgery. Due to the simplicity of the procedure it was performed quickly, and Herzfeld was said to have performed 6 such operations in 50 minutes.

== Death and legacy ==
Herzfeld died in May 1981, at the age of 91; her obituary in the British Medical Journal contained a tribute in which she was lauded as being "a large woman in heart [and] mind" who had "always longed to be a doctor":

"None of her housemen could forget her great figure bending over a tiny neonate, opening and semi-constructing a blind cystic duct, easing a pyloric stenosis, or, later, apposing two raw edges of a minute cleft palate. Her wards attracted patients with conditions that we had never seen as students. Before the days of chromosome determination, sex was mysteriously undefined in more children than we expected, and from all over Scotland they came for cosmetic repair and the difficult assessment of what course they were to follow. This was done by a great deal more than surgery: infinite thought, getting to know the child, the mother, the surroundings—a psychosomatic exercise in which Gertrude Herzfeld's warmth and wisdom combined with her skill."

In recognition of Herzfeld's contributions to the history of women in medicine as well as to the fields of paediatric and gynaecological surgery, Edinburgh council has included 'Herzfeld' in its street name bank for future developments in the South Central area of the city.
