= St John the Evangelist's Church, Farnworth =

Coordinates: 53.5485°N 2.3878°W

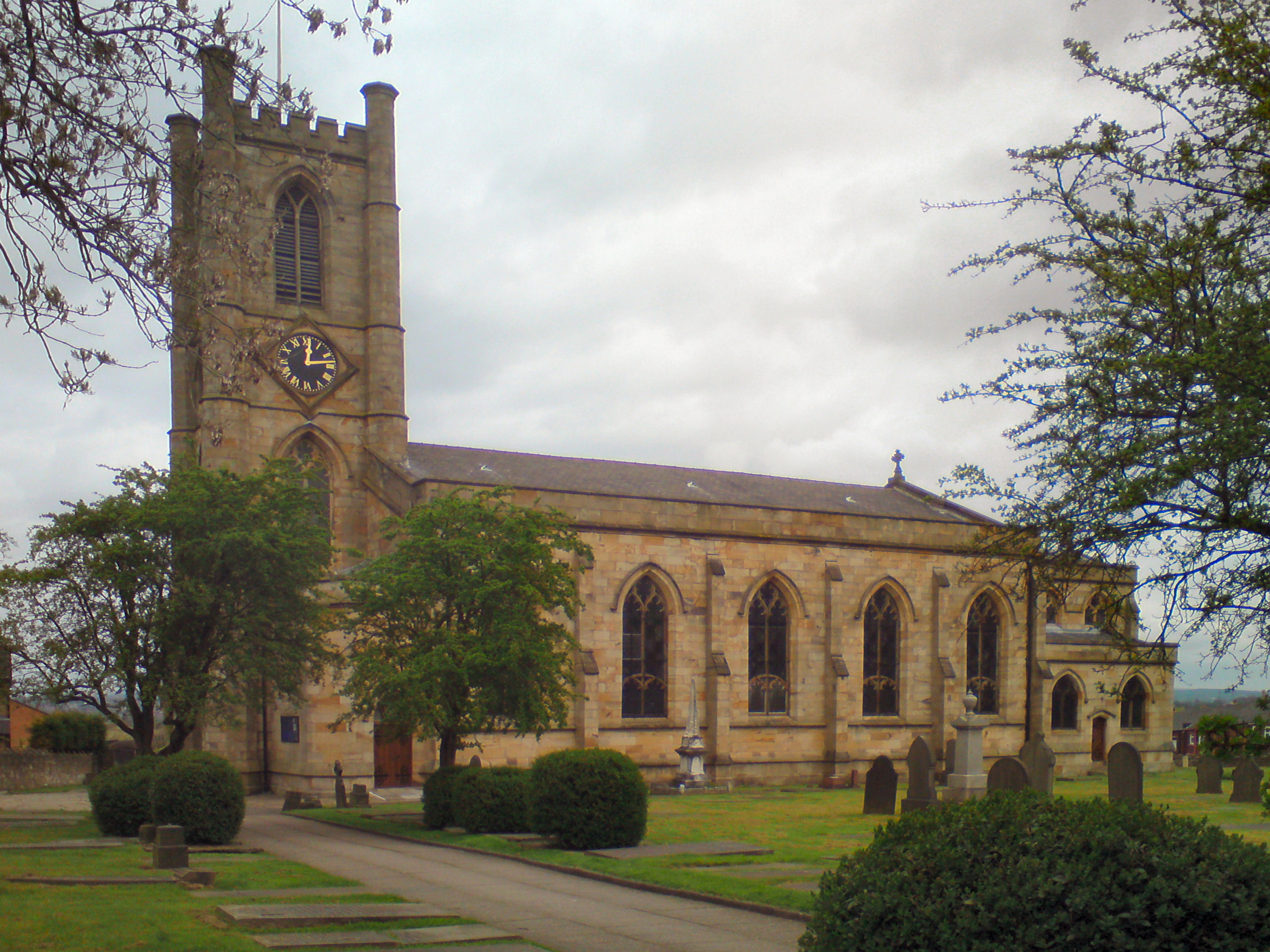
- St John the Evangelist's Church from the south

- Location in Greater Manchester
- OS grid reference: SD 744,058
- Location: Farnworth, Greater Manchester
- Country: England
- Denomination: Anglican
- Website: St John the Evangelist, Farnworth

History
- Status: Parish church
- Dedication: Saint John the Evangelist

Architecture
- Functional status: Active
- Heritage designation: Grade II
- Designated: 31 May 1966
- Architect(s): Thomas Hardwick, Paley and Austin
- Architectural type: Church
- Style: Gothic Revival
- Groundbreaking: 1824
- Completed: 1871

Administration
- Province: York
- Diocese: Manchester
- Archdeaconry: Bolton
- Deanery: Bolton
- Parish: Farnworth and Kearsley

Clergy
- Vicar: Rev'd Stephen Nolan

St John the Evangelist's Church is in Church Street, Farnworth, Greater Manchester, England. It is an active Anglican parish church in the deanery of Bolton, the archdeaconry of Bolton, and the diocese of Manchester. Its benefice is united with those of St Peter, Farnworth, Holy Trinity, Prestolee, and St Saviour, Ringley. The church is recorded in the National Heritage List for England as a designated Grade II listed building.

== History ==
St John's was built as a Commissioners' church between 1824 and 1826 to a design by Thomas Hardwick. The chancel and porches were added in 1873 by the Lancaster architects Paley and Austin, and the church was restored, at a cost of £4,000 (equivalent to £380,000 in 2025). In 1912 the pinnacles were removed from the tower.

== Architecture ==
=== Exterior ===
The church is constructed in stone and has slate roofs. Its plan consists of a five-bay nave, a three-bay chancel, a south vestry, an organ loft to the north, and a west tower. The tower is in four stages separated by string courses, and has octagonal buttresses rising to turrets at the corners. In the bottom is a doorway with a pointed arch, above which is a two-light window. In the third stage is a diagonal clock face, and the two-light bell openings are louvred. The parapet is embattled. On each side of the tower are two-light windows, and there are similar windows on the north and south sides of the church. The east widow has five lights.

=== Interior ===
There is a gallery on three sides of the church, supported by octagonal columns. On the west gallery are the royal arms of George I. The ceiling is flat and contains ribs and bosses. Between the chancel and the vestry to the north and the organ loft to the south are two-bay arcades. The reredos and pews date from 1874. The font is octagonal, standing on a moulded shaft, and has panelled sides. The wooden pulpit dates from 1907, and stands on a stone quatrefoil column. The stained glass in the east window depicts the Baptism of Jesus and the Crucifixion. Elsewhere there is glass by Heaton, Butler and Bayne of 1908, G. Wragge of 1923, Shrigley and Hunt of 1939, and W. Pointer of 1958. The three-manual pipe organ was built in 1894 by Peter Conacher and Company. In 1980 its action was changed from tubular-pneumatic to electro-pneumatic by H. Y. Ainscough. However, by 2002 it had become unreliable. It was mothballed and replaced by an electronic organ. There is a ring of eight bells, all of which were cast in 1954 by John Taylor & Co.

== External features ==
The gates and gate piers to the churchyard dating from about 1826 or later are listed at Grade II. The churchyard contains the war grave of a Royal Army Service Corps soldier of World War I.

The churchyard also contains the grave of Thomas Bonsor Crompton, inventor of the felted drying cylinder, which he patented in 1821. This allowed for the continuous drying of paper for the first time.

== See also ==
- Listed buildings in Farnworth
- List of ecclesiastical works by Paley and Austin
- List of Commissioners' churches in Northeast and Northwest England
