= Listed buildings in Farnworth =

Farnworth is a town and an unparished area in the Metropolitan Borough of Bolton, Greater Manchester, England. It contains 14 listed buildings that are recorded in the National Heritage List for England. All the listed buildings are designated at Grade II, the lowest of the three grades, which is applied to "buildings of national importance and special interest". The area is mainly residential, and the listed buildings include churches and associated structures, two former cotton mills, a railway bridge and a tunnel, a former toll house, a public library, a town hall, a former country house, a war memorial, and a public house.

== Buildings ==
Name and location	Photograph	Date	Notes
Rock Hall; 53.55682°N 2.38812°W		c. 1807	Originally a country house, later a visitor centre, it is in brick with a stone base, a top cornice, and a slate roof. There are two storeys and five bays, the middle three bays projecting forward under a pediment. The windows are sashes, and above the door is a fanlight.
St John the Evangelist's Church; 53.54855°N 2.38792°W		1824–1826	This was a Commissioners' church designed by Thomas Hardwick, and the chancel was added in 1873. The church is in stone with a slate roof, and consists of a nave, a chancel, a north organ loft, a south vestry, and a west tower. The tower has a pointed entrance, string courses, a cornice, and an embattled parapet with corner turrets.
Gates and gate piers, St John the Evangelist's Church; 53.54859°N 2.38834°W		c. 1826	The gate piers are in stone, and have rectangular traceried panels and caps with embattled mouldings. The decorative gates are in wrought iron, and walls lead from the gate piers to similar end piers.
Railway Bridge No. 46; 53.55309°N 2.39445°W	—	c. 1837	The bridge was built for the Manchester and Bolton Railway, whose engineer for this was Jesse Hartley, to carry a road over the line. It is in stone, and consists of a single elliptical arch. The bridge has a balustrade with some brick infilling, and keystones. The northern keystone is inscribed with initials, and the southern one has a crest.
Clammerclough Railway Tunnel; 53.54865°N 2.38405°W	—	1838	The tunnel was built for the Manchester and Bolton Railway, whose engineer for this was John Hawkshaw, and is in stone and brick. It is about 280 metres (920 ft) long, the north entrance has a semicircular arch with large voussoirs, and the south entrance has a horseshoe arch.
124 Bradford Road; 53.55170°N 2.42040°W		c. 1855 (probable)	Originally a toll house, later a private house, it is in stone and has a slate roof with overhanging eaves. There is one storey with an attic, two bays, and a small brick outhouse at the rear. The windows have small-paned glazing; the windows and doorway have Tudor arched heads, and hood moulds. In the outhouse is a casement window.
St Thomas' Church; 53.54918°N 2.40431°W		1879	The church is in stone, on a plinth, it has slate roofs with red ridge tiles, and is in Early English style. It consists of a nave with a clerestory, north and south aisles, north and south porches, a chancel with an apse, an organ chamber, and a vestry. The windows in the aisles have pointed heads and two lights containing plate tracery, in the clerestory are lancet windows, and the west window has five lights.
Cobden Mill; 53.55241°N 2.40703°W		c. 1890	A former cotton spinning mill in brick with a flat roof. The main block has five storeys and 22 bays, and the ancillary buildings include a lower block, an engine house, a boiler house, and a canteen. At the northeast angle is a water tower, and the windows are separated by pilasters.
Alan Ball House (former Baptist Church); 53.55154°N 2.39729°W		1906	The former church (now apartments), designed by Bradshaw and Gass is in red brick with terracotta dressings, a decorative band, and a Welsh slate roof. The entrance front has a central bay with a wide segmental pediment and lower flanking bays each with a moulded cornice and a parapet. The doorway has a moulded surround and an open pediment and contains double doors, and above it is a large Venetian window. Along the sides are two storeys, and a central gabled transept with a pediment and a Venetian window. Flanking this on the upper storey are Diocletian windows, and in the right bay is a canted bay window.
Town Hall; 53.55093°N 2.39610°W		1908	The town hall is in brick with sandstone dressings and quoins, and has a hipped slate roof. There are two storeys and nine bays, the central three bays projecting forward under a pediment, and there are segmental pediments in the central bays on each side. On the front is a semicircular porch with Ionic columns, and above in the pediment is a Diocletian window. The other windows have mullions, and on the roof is a central cupola.
Carnegie Library; 53.55130°N 2.39692°W		1911	A public library in brick with sandstone dressings, a flat roof, and a central dome. It has a single storey and projections to the front and rear. In the centre is a projecting doorcase that has columns with capitals with relief carving, a fanlight, an ornately decorated frieze, and a large segmental open pediment. The doorway is flanked by canted wings. Outside it are ranges containing three-light windows, and with segmental upstands each containing an oculus.
Horrockses Mill; 53.55664°N 2.40598°W		1915	A former cotton spinning mill built in brick. The main block has five storeys, an almost square plan, and towers at three angles with embattled parapets, one with a pyramidal roof. The front block has three storeys and sides of eight and five bays, the engine house has three storeys and sides of five and three bays, there is a single-storey warehouse, and a range with two storeys and sides of eleven and four bays.
Cenotaph; 53.55148°N 2.39863°W		1924	The war memorial is in Stanton gritstone, and consists of a tapering square column on a plinth standing on two octagonal stone steps. Near the top are carved laurel wreaths, and the column is surmounted by a bronze statue of a female figure, holding a wreath and blowing a trumpet. On the south face of the plinth is an inscribed plaque, and on the other faces are plaques containing the names of those lost in the two world wars.
Shakespeare public house 53.55005°N 2.40340°W		1926	The public house stands on a corner site, it is in red brick and buff terracotta with a Delabole slate roof, and is in Tudor Revival style. Both fronts have two storeys and three bays. The front on Albert Street has a central arched doorway with double doors and a fanlight, and above it is a mullioned and transomed window and a stepped parapet. The outer bays are gabled with decorative bargeboards, and contain canted bay windows with five-light windows above. In the Glynn Street front, the central bay is gabled and contains a doorway, the windows in the outer bays are mullioned and transomed, and those on the upper floor are mullioned.
