= Bolton Royal Infirmary =

- Bolton NHS Trust
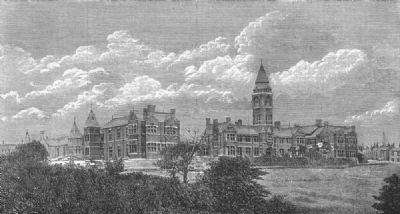
- Bolton Royal Infirmary

- Shown in Greater Manchester

Geography
- Location: Bolton, Greater Manchester, England
- Coordinates: 53.5805°N 2.4407°W

Organisation
- Care system: NHS

Services
- Beds: 224

History
- Founded: 1814
- Closed: 1996
- Demolished: 1999

Links
- Website: www.boltonft.nhs.uk

The Bolton Royal Infirmary was an acute general hospital in Chorley Street, Bolton, Greater Manchester, England.

== History ==
The infirmary had its origins in the Bolton Dispensary established in Mawdsley Street in 1814. A campaign for a larger facility was established by Canon James Slade in 1820 and a new building, designed by Benjamin Hick and built on land at Nelson Square donated by the Earl of Bradford, was completed in 1827. A replacement infirmary, designed by Richard Knill Freeman and sited east of Queen's Park on Chorley Street, was completed in 1883.

During the First World War the nurses' quarters were converted to create a military hospital. Gertrude Herzfeld, the first woman paediatric surgeon, was senior house surgeon at the infirmary from 1917 to 1919.

After services were transferred to the Royal Bolton Hospital, the infirmary was closed in 1996 and demolished in 1999.
