= Campbell Hospital, Portsoy =

- NHS Grampian
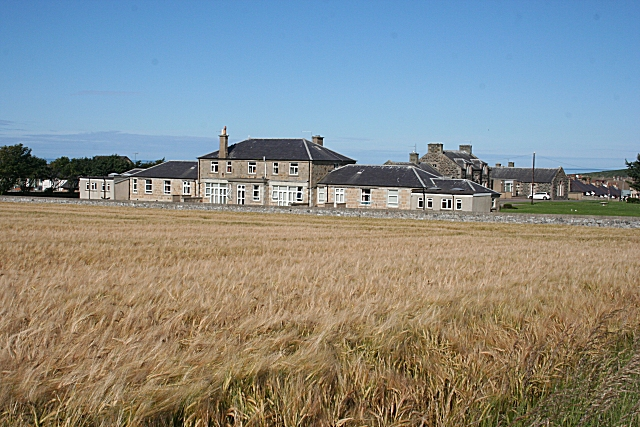
- Campbell Hospital

- Shown in Aberdeenshire

Geography
- Location: Portsoy, Aberdeenshire, Scotland, United Kingdom
- Coordinates: 57°40′57″N 2°42′0″W

Organisation
- Care system: NHS Scotland
- Type: Specialist

Services
- Emergency department: No Accident & Emergency
- Speciality: Geriatrics

History
- Founded: 1902
- Closed: 2011

Links
- Lists: Hospitals in Scotland

Campbell Hospital was a National Health Service hospital in Portsoy, Aberdeenshire, Scotland. It was administered by NHS Grampian.

== History ==
The hospital was initiated following a donation from a Mr Campbell and the gift of land by the Dowager Countess of Seafield. It was designed by William Kelly as an infectious diseases hospital. It was opened as the Campbell Infectious Diseases Hospital in 1904 and was extended in 1926 and 1939. It joined the National Health Service as a geriatric hospital in 1948. Following development work at Chalmers Hospital, Banff, Campbell Hospital closed in early 2011.
