= Farnworth Town Hall =

Municipal building in Farnworth, Greater Manchester, England

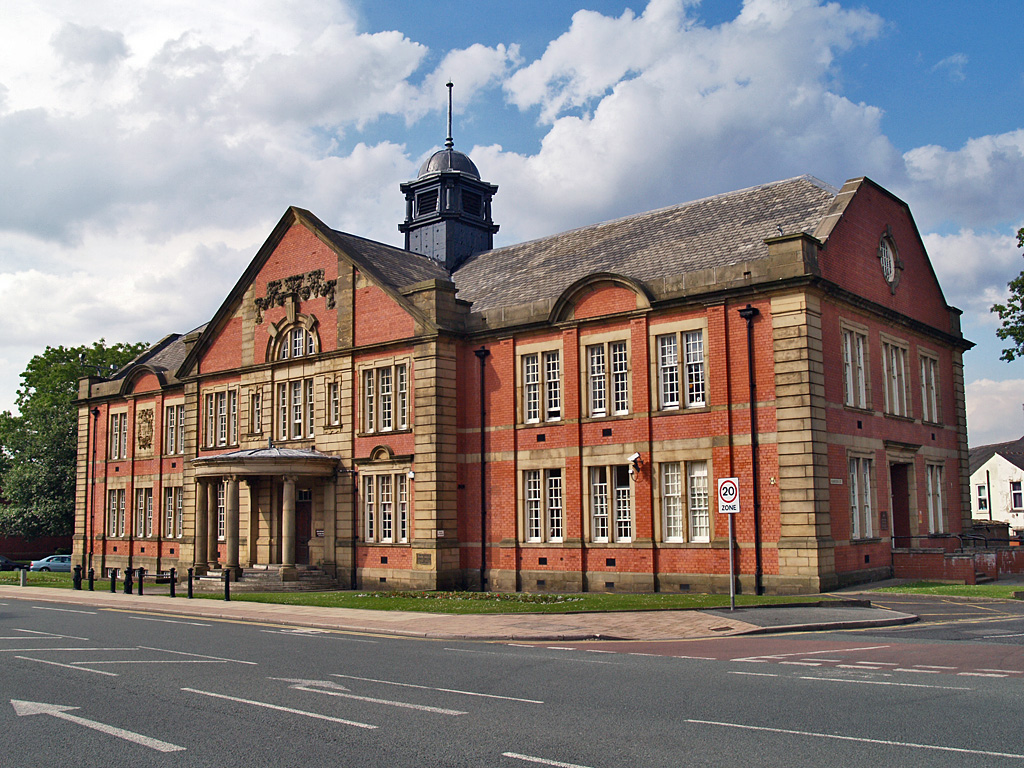
- Farnworth Town Hall

- Shown in Greater Manchester
- 53.5510°N 2.3961°W
- Location: Market Street, Farnworth

History
- Built: 1909

Site notes
- Architect: Bradshaw Gass & Hope
- Architectural style: Neoclassical style

Listed Building – Grade II
- Official name: Town Hall
- Designated: 29 September 1999
- Reference no.: 1113252

Farnworth Town Hall is a municipal building in Market Street, Farnworth, Greater Manchester, England. The town hall, which was the headquarters of Farnworth Borough Council, is a grade II listed building.

== History ==
Shortly after it had been created in 1863, the local board of health established itself in a small office in Darley Street. After population growth associated with the increasing number of local coal mines led to the area becoming an urban district in 1894, civic leaders decided to procure a dedicated town hall: the site they selected was open land between Trafford Street and Rawson Street.

The new building, which was designed by Bradshaw Gass & Hope in the neoclassical style and built in red brick with stone dressings, was officially opened by the chairman of the council, Thomas Stanley, on 30 March 1909. The design involved a symmetrical main frontage with nine bays facing onto Market Street; the central section of three bays, which slightly projected forward, featured a semi-circular porch with Ionic order columns; there was a three-light mullioned window on the first floor and a Diocletian window flanked by pilasters in the pediment above. The middle bay in the left hand section featured a carved coat of arms on the first floor with a curved pediment above, while the middle bay in the right hand section featured a mullioned window on the first floor with a curved pediment above. At roof level, there was a central cupola. Internally, the principal rooms were the council chamber and the mayor's parlour, both on the first floor; there was a large stained glass window on the staircase depicting the council coat of arms.

Civic leaders also procured a Carnegie library which was designed by the same architectural firm, built on open land between Carlton Street and Trafford Street (just to the north of the town hall) and completed in 1911. The town hall was subsequently extended to the north to create an additional bay which was set back to maintain the symmetrical form of the building. After the area achieved municipal borough status in 1939, the building became the headquarters of the new borough council but ceased to be the local seat of government when the enlarged Bolton Council was formed in 1974. Although the building was subsequently used for community purposes, it subsequently fell into a state of disrepair.

On 2 July 1992, a security guard, Ian Foster, was fatally shot on the front steps of the town hall after being forced to hand over takings he had collected from an office in the building. Two men were subsequently tried and convicted of his murder. After an extensive programme of refurbishment works costing £1.3 million had been completed in June 2013, the building re-opened as additional workspace for the council departments of Bolton Council.

== See also ==
- Listed buildings in Farnworth
