= List of boundary changes in North West England =

Map of North West England

This is a list of boundary changes occurring in the North West England region of England, since the re-organisation of local government following the passing of the Local Government Act 1972.

== Administrative boundaries ==
=== Initial creation ===
When the Local Government Act 1972 was passed there were still some details left to be decided, the Local Government Boundary Commission for England's first work was to clarify these details.

Date	Statutory Instrument	LGBCE Report
1 February 1973	The English Non-Metropolitan Districts (Definition) Order 1972	Report No. 001: Recommendations for new Districts in the non-Metropolitan Counties November 1972
5 March 1973	The Divided Areas (Boundaries) Order 1973	n/a
1 May 1973	The English Non-Metropolitan Districts (Names) Order 1973	Report No. 002: Names of Non-Metropolitan Districts March 1973
1 April 1973	The Metropolitan Districts (Names) Order 1973	n/a

=== Principal Area Boundary Reviews ===
The Local Government Boundary Commission for England (or LGBCE) was established by the Local Government Act 1972 to review the administrative boundaries of every local authority in England. Between 1974 and 1992 they completed a series of Principal Area Boundary Reviews; reviewing the administrative boundaries of local authorities at their request.

Date	Statutory Instrument	Effect	LGBCE Report(s)
1 April 1981	The Manchester and Trafford (Areas) Order 1980	Changes to the Manchester/Trafford (both Greater Manchester) boundary	Report No. 381: Manchester/Trafford October 1980
1 April 1982	The Greater Manchester and Lancashire (Areas) Order 1981	Changes to the Wigan (Greater Manchester)/West Lancashire (Lancashire) boundary	Report No. 404: West Lancashire/Wigan November 1980
1 April 1983	The Macclesfield and Vale Royal (Areas) Order 1982	Changes to the Macclesfield/Vale Royal (both Cheshire) boundary	Report No. 418: Macclesfield/Vale Royal August 1981
1 April 1984	The Allerdale and Carlisle (Areas) Order 1983	Changes to the Allerdale/Carlisle (both Cumbria) boundary	Report No. 423: Allerdale/Carlisle February 1982
1 April 1987	The Lancashire (District Boundaries) Order 1986	Changes to the boundaries of: Burnley (Lancashire); Chorley (Lancashire); Hyndburn (Lancashire); Pendle (Lancashire); Ribble Valley (Lancashire); South Ribble (Lancashire)	Report No. 444: Preston/Ribble Valley June 1983; Report No. 481: South Ribble/Ribble Valley August 1984; Report No. 501: Chorley/South Ribble July 1985; Report No. 505: Ribble Valley/Hyndburn/Burnley/Pendle October 1985
1 April 1988	The Cheshire (District Boundaries) Order 1988	Changes to the Chester/Vale Royal (both Cheshire) boundary	Report No. 518: Chester/Vale Royal November 1986

Other principal area boundary reviews

- Report No. 504: Dee Estuary (England/Wales) November 1985

=== Mandatory Reviews of non-Metropolitan Counties, Metropolitan Districts and London Boroughs ===
In 1985 they began the first full administrative review of all non-metropolitan counties. Their reviews of metropolitan counties and Greater London began in 1987 and both reviews were completed in 1992.

Date	Statutory Instrument	Effect	LGBCE Report(s)
1 April 1989	The Cumbria and Lancashire (County Boundaries) Order 1988	Changes to the Lancaster (Lancashire)/South Lakeland (Cumbria) boundary	Report No. 552: Lancashire June 1988
1 April 1990	The Cumbria, Northumberland and North Yorkshire (County Boundaries) Order 1989	Changes to the: Carlisle (Cumbria)/Tynedale (Northumberland) boundary; Eden (Cumbria)/Richmondshire (North Yorkshire) boundary	Report No. 557: Cumbria July 1988
1 April 1992	The Bolton, Bury and Salford (District Boundaries) Order 1991	Changes to the: Bolton/Bury (both Greater Manchester) boundary; Bolton/Salford (both Greater Manchester) boundary	Report No. 587: Salford May 1990; Report No. 591: Bolton July 1990
1 April 1991	The Cheshire, Derbyshire, Hereford and Worcester and Staffordshire (County Boundaries) Order 1991	Changes to the: Congleton (Cheshire)/Newcastle-under-Lyme (Staffordshire) boundary; Wyre Forest (Hereford and Worcester)/South Staffordshire (Staffordshire) boundary; High Peak (Derbyshire)/Staffordshire Moorlands (Staffordshire) boundary; Derbyshire Dales (Derbyshire)/Staffordshire Moorlands (Staffordshire) boundary; Derbyshire Dales (Derbyshire)/East Staffordshire (Staffordshire) boundary; South Derbyshire (Derbyshire)/East Staffordshire (Staffordshire) boundary; South Derbyshire (Derbyshire)/South Staffordshire (Staffordshire) boundary; South Derbyshire (Derbyshire)/Lichfield (Staffordshire) boundary	Report No. 582: Staffordshire February 1990
1 April 1992	The Derbyshire and Greater Manchester (County Boundaries) Order 1991	Changes to the High Peak (Derbyshire)/Tameside (Greater Manchester) boundary	Report No. 590: Tameside August 1990
1 April 1993	The Cheshire and Greater Manchester (County and District Boundaries) Order 1992	Changes to the: Macclesfield (Cheshire)/Trafford (Greater Manchester) boundary; Warrington (Cheshire)/Trafford (Greater Manchester) boundary; Manchester/Trafford (both Greater Manchester) boundary	Report No. 605: Trafford July 1991
1 April 1993	The Cheshire and Greater Manchester (County and District Boundaries) (No. 2) Order 1992	Changes to the: Macclesfield (Cheshire)/Manchester (Greater Manchester) boundary; Manchester/Salford (both Greater Manchester) boundary; Manchester/Stockport (both Greater Manchester) boundary; Manchester/Tameside (both Greater Manchester) boundary	Report No. 617: Manchester January 1992
1 April 1993	The Cheshire and Merseyside (County Boundaries) Order 1992	Changes to the Ellesmere Port (Cheshire)/Wirral (Merseyside) boundary	Report No. 612: Wirral November 1991
1 April 1992	The Cheshire, Derbyshire, Hereford and Worcester and Staffordshire (County Boundaries) (Variation) Order 1992	n/a	n/a
1 April 1993	The Greater Manchester and West Yorkshire (County and District Boundaries) Order 1992	Changes to the: Oldham (Greater Manchester)/Kirklees (West Yorkshire) boundary; Oldham/Rochdale (both Greater Manchester) boundary; Oldham/Manchester (both Greater Manchester) boundary; Oldham/Tameside (both Greater Manchester) boundary	Report No. 611: Oldham October 1991
1 April 1994	The Bolton and Salford (City and Metropolitan Borough Boundaries) Order 1993	Changes to the Bolton/Salford (both Greater Manchester) boundary	Report No. 635: Salford (Further Review) April 1992
1 April 1994	The Cheshire and Merseyside (County and Metropolitan Borough Boundaries) Order 1993	Changes to the: Liverpool (Merseyside)/Halton (Cheshire) boundary; Liverpool/Sefton (both Merseyside) boundary	Report No. 673: Liverpool September 1992
1 April 1994	The Cheshire, Derbyshire and Greater Manchester (County and District Boundaries) Order 1993	Changes to the: Macclesfield (Cheshire)/Stockport (Greater Manchester) boundary; High Peak (Derbyshire)/Stockport (Greater Manchester) boundary; Stockport/Tameside (both Greater Manchester) boundary	Report No. 616: Stockport November 1991
1 April 1994	The Cheshire, Greater Manchester, Lancashire and Merseyside (County and District Boundaries) Order 1993	Changes to the: Warrington (Cheshire)/Wigan (Greater Manchester) boundary; Wigan (Greater Manchester)/West Lancashire (Lancashire) boundary; Wigan (Greater Manchester)/St Helens (Merseyside) boundary; Bolton/Wigan (both Greater Manchester) boundary; Salford/Wigan (both Greater Manchester) boundary; West Lancashire/Chorley (both Lancashire) boundary	Report No. 655: Wigan June 1992
1 April 1994	The Cheshire, Lancashire and Merseyside (County and Metropolitan Borough Boundaries) Order 1993	Changes to the: Halton (Cheshire)/Knowsley (Merseyside) boundary; Knowsley (Merseyside)/West Lancashire (Lancashire) boundary; Sefton (Merseyside)/West Lancashire (Lancashire) boundary; Knowsley/Sefton (both Merseyside) boundary; Knowsley/St Helens (both Merseyside) boundary; Knowsley/Liverpool (both Merseyside) boundary	Report No. 668: Knowsley July 1992
1 April 1994	The Cheshire, Lancashire and Merseyside (County Boundaries) Order 1993	Changes to the: Warrington (Cheshire)/St Helens (Merseyside) boundary; Halton (Cheshire)/St Helens (Merseyside) boundary; West Lancashire (Lancashire)/St Helens (Merseyside) boundary	Report No. 625: St Helens February 1992
1 April 1994	The Greater Manchester and Lancashire (County and District Boundaries) Order 1993	Changes to the: Blackburn (Lancashire)/Bury (Greater Manchester) boundary; Rossendale (Lancashire)/Bury (Greater Manchester) boundary; Bury/Manchester (both Greater Manchester) boundary; Bury/Salford (both Greater Manchester) boundary	Report No. 649: Bury June 1992
1 April 1994	The Greater Manchester and Lancashire (County and Metropolitan Borough Boundaries) Order 1993	Changes to the: Rochdale (Greater Manchester)/Rossendale (Lancashire) boundary; Bury/Rochdale (both Greater Manchester) boundary	Report No. 584: Rochdale January 1990
1 April 1994	The Lancashire and Merseyside (County Boundaries) Order 1993	Changes to the West Lancashire (Lancashire)/Sefton (Merseyside) boundary	Report No. 664: Sefton July 1992

Other mandatory meviews of non-metropolitan counties, metropolitan districts and London boroughs

- Report No. 562: Cheshire August 1988

== Electoral boundaries ==
=== Initial creation ===
When the Local Government Act 1972 was passed there was not sufficient time to draw up proper electoral boundaries for the new county and district councils, so a temporary system was quickly put in place, intended to only be used for the first elections in 1973.

Date	Statutory Instrument
7 June 1973	The County of Cheshire (District Wards) Order 1973
12 April 1973	The County of Cheshire (Electoral Divisions) Order 1973
7 June 1973	The County of Cumbria (District Wards) Order 1973
12 April 1973	The County of Cumbria (Electoral Divisions) Order 1973
12 April 1973 & 10 May 1973	The County of Greater Manchester (Electoral Divisions and Wards) Order 1973
7 June 1973	The County of Lancashire (District Wards) Order 1973
12 April 1973	The County of Lancashire (Electoral Divisions) Order 1973
12 April 1973 & 10 May 1973	The County of Merseyside (Electoral Divisions and Wards) Order 1973

=== First periodic review ===
The Local Government Boundary Commission for England (or LGBCE) was established by the Local Government Act 1972 to review the electoral boundaries of every local authority in England. In 1974 they began the first full electoral review of all metropolitan and non-metropolitan districts, completing it in July 1980. Their reviews of the county councils were completed in 1984.

Date	Statutory Instrument	LGBCE Report
6 May 1976	The Borough of Blackpool (Electoral Arrangements) Order 1975	Report No. 053: Blackpool August 1975
6 May 1976	The Borough of Chorley (Electoral Arrangements) Order 1975	Report No. 055: Chorley September 1975
6 May 1976	The Borough of Congleton (Electoral Arrangements) Order 1975	Report No. 038: Congleton August 1975
6 May 1976	The Borough of Fylde (Electoral Arrangements) Order 1975	Report No. 039: Fylde August 1975
6 May 1976	The Borough of Preston (Electoral Arrangements) Order 1975	Report No. 022: Preston June 1975
6 May 1976	The Borough of South Ribble (Electoral Arrangements) Order 1975	Report No. 028: South Ribble July 1975
6 May 1976	The District of Pendle (Electoral Arrangements) Order 1975	Report No. 020: Pendle July 1975
3 May 1979	The Borough of Barrow-in-Furness (Electoral Arrangements) Order 1976	Report No. 098: Barrow-in-Furness November 1975
3 May 1979	The Borough of Blackburn (Electoral Arrangements) Order 1976	Report No. 143: Blackburn February 1976
6 May 1976	The Borough of Burnley (Electoral Arrangements) Order 1976	Report No. 092: Burnley October 1975
6 May 1976	The Borough of Ellesmere Port (Electoral Arrangements) Order 1976	Report No. 095: Ellesmere Port November 1975
6 May 1976	The Borough of Halton (Electoral Arrangements) Order 1976	Report No. 115: Halton November 1975
3 May 1979	The Borough of Hyndburn (Electoral Arrangements) Order 1976	Report No. 067: Hyndburn October 1975
6 May 1976	The Borough of Ribble Valley (Electoral Arrangements) Order 1976	Report No. 082: Ribble Valley October 1975
6 May 1976	The Borough of Rossendale (Electoral Arrangements) Order 1976	Report No. 110: Rossendale November 1975
3 May 1979	The Borough of Wyre (Electoral Arrangements) Order 1976	Report No. 088: Wyre October 1975
3 May 1979	The District of Eden (Electoral Arrangements) Order 1976	Report No. 112: Eden December 1975
6 May 1976	The District of Vale Royal (Electoral Arrangements) Order 1976	Report No. 099: Vale Royal November 1975
6 May 1976	The District of West Lancashire (Electoral Arrangements) Order 1976	Report No. 102: West Lancashire October 1975
3 May 1979	The Borough of Crewe and Nantwich (Electoral Arrangements) Order 1977	Report No. 150: Crewe and Nantwich April 1976
3 May 1979	The City of Lancaster (Electoral Arrangements) Order 1977	Report No. 052: Lancaster September 1975
3 May 1979	The Borough of Bury (Electoral Arrangements) Order 1978	Report No. 277: Bury January 1978
3 May 1979	The Borough of Copeland (Electoral Arrangements) Order 1978	Report No. 270: Copeland January 1978
3 May 1979	The Borough of Macclesfield (Electoral Arrangements) Order 1978	Report No. 191: Macclesfield November 1977
3 May 1979	The Borough of Oldham (Electoral Arrangements) Order 1978	Report No. 229: Oldham July 1977
3 May 1979	The Borough of Sefton (Electoral Arrangements) Order 1978	Report No. 237: Sefton August 1977
3 May 1979	The Borough of Warrington (Electoral Arrangements) Order 1978	Report No. 153: Warrington June 1976
3 May 1979	The City of Chester (Electoral Arrangements) Order 1978	Report No. 238: Chester August 1977
3 May 1979	The District of Allerdale (Electoral Arrangements) Order 1978	Report No. 267: Allerdale January 1978
3 May 1979	The District of South Lakeland (Electoral Arrangements) Order 1978	Report No. 272: South Lakeland August 1978
1 May 1980	The Borough of Bolton (Electoral Arrangements) Order 1979	Report No. 289: Bolton September 1978
1 May 1980	The Borough of Rochdale (Electoral Arrangements) Order 1979	Report No. 322: Rochdale April 1979
1 May 1980	The Borough of St Helens (Electoral Arrangements) Order 1979	Report No. 329: St Helens April 1979
1 May 1980	The Borough of Stockport (Electoral Arrangements) Order 1979	Report No. 317: Stockport January 1979
1 May 1980	The Borough of Tameside (Electoral Arrangements) Order 1979	Report No. 220: Tameside July 1977
1 May 1980	The Borough of Trafford (Electoral Arrangements) Order 1979	Report No. 300: Trafford October 1978
1 May 1980	The Borough of Wigan (Electoral Arrangements) Order 1979	Report No. 324: Wigan March 1979
1 May 1980	The Borough of Wirral (Electoral Arrangements) Order 1979	Report No. 328: Wirral April 1979
5 May 1983	The City of Carlisle (Electoral Arrangements) Order 1979	Report No. 269: Carlisle January 1978
1 May 1980	The City of Liverpool (Electoral Arrangements) Order 1979	Report No. 319: Liverpool January 1979
6 May 1982	The Borough of Knowsley (Electoral Arrangements) Order 1980	Report No. 378: Knowsley March 1980
6 May 1982	The City of Salford (Electoral Arrangements) Order 1980	Report No. 347: Salford August 1979
7 May 1981	The County of Cheshire (Electoral Arrangements) Order 1980	Report No. 391: Cheshire August 1980
6 May 1982	The City of Manchester (Electoral Arrangements) Order 1981	Report No. 252: Manchester September 1977; Report No. 393: City of Manchester (second review) August 1980
7 May 1981	The County of Cumbria (Electoral Arrangements) Order 1981	Report No. 400: Cumbria October 1980
7 May 1981	The County of Lancashire (Electoral Arrangements) Order 1981	Report No. 399: Lancashire November 1980
1 October 1985	The County of Greater Manchester (Electoral Arrangements) Order 1985	Report No. 482: Greater Manchester September 1984
1 November 1985	The County of Merseyside (Electoral Arrangements) Order 1985	Report No. 488: Merseyside December 1984

=== Further electoral reviews by the LGBCE ===
Local authorities could request a further review if they felt that there were changes in circumstances since the initial review. The LGBCE would only approve this if they felt it was appropriate because of major changes in the size or distribution of the electorate.

Date	Statutory Instrument	LGBCE Report
8 May 1986	The Borough of Halton (Electoral Arrangements) Order 1986	Report No. 508: Halton October 1985
7 May 1987	The Borough of South Ribble (Electoral Arrangements) Order 1987	Report No. 528: South Ribble December 1986
3 May 1990	The Borough of Preston (Electoral Arrangements) Order 1989	Report No. 567: Preston October 1988
2 May 1991	The Borough of Warrington (Electoral Arrangements) Order 1989	Report No. 530: Warrington December 1986
2 May 1991	The Borough of Burnley (Electoral Arrangements) Order 1990	Report No. 588: Burnley May 1990

=== Second periodic review ===
The Local Government Act 1992 established the Local Government Commission for England (or LGCE) as the successor to the LGBCE. In 1996 they began the second full electoral review of English local authorities. On 1 April 2002 the Boundary Committee for England (or BCfE) took over the functions of the LGBCE and carried on the review, completing it in 2004.

Date	Statutory Instrument	LGCE/BCfE Report(s)
1 May 1997	The Borough of Blackburn (Parishes and Electoral Changes) Order 1997	Draft report September 1996 Final report 6 December 1996
1 May 1997	The Borough of Blackpool (Electoral Changes) Order 1997	Draft report 3 September 1996 Final report 6 December 1996
1 May 1997	The Borough of Halton (Electoral Changes) Order 1997	Draft report 3 September 1996 Final report 6 December 1996
1 May 1997	The Borough of Warrington (Parishes and Electoral Changes) Order 1997	Draft report 3 September 1996 Final report 6 December 1996
6 May 1999	The Borough of Allerdale (Electoral Changes) Order 1998	Draft report 28 May 1997 Final report 4 November 1997
6 May 1999	The Borough of Barrow-in-Furness (Electoral Changes) Order 1998	Draft report 28 May 1997 Final report 4 November 1997
6 May 1999	The Borough of Congleton (Electoral Changes) Order 1998	Draft report 2 December 1997 Final report 31 March 1998
6 May 1999	The Borough of Copeland (Electoral Changes) Order 1998	Draft report 10 June 1997 Final report 4 November 1997
6 May 1999	The Borough of Crewe and Nantwich (Electoral Changes) Order 1998	Draft report 3 February 1998 Final report 2 June 1998
6 May 1999	The Borough of Ellesmere Port and Neston (Electoral Changes) Order 1998	Draft report 4 November 1997 Final report 31 March 1998
6 May 1999	The Borough of Macclesfield (Electoral Changes) Order 1998	Draft report 4 November 1997 Final report 31 March 1998
6 May 1999	The Borough of Vale Royal (Electoral Changes) Order 1998	Draft report 4 November 1997 Final report 31 March 1998
6 May 1999	The City of Carlisle (Electoral Changes) Order 1998	Draft report 28 May 1997 Final report 4 November 1997
6 May 1999	The City of Chester (Electoral Changes) Order 1998	Draft report December 1997 Final report 31 March 1998
6 May 1999	The District of Eden (Electoral Changes) Order 1998	Draft report 10 June 1997 Final report 4 November 1997
6 May 1999	The District of South Lakeland (Electoral Changes) Order 1998	Draft report 10 June 1997 Final report 4 November 1997
4 May 2000	The Borough of Sefton (Electoral Changes) Order 1999	Draft report 1 July 1997 Final report 25 November 1997
7 June 2001	The County of Cheshire (Electoral Changes) Order 2000	Draft report July 1999 Final report January 2000
7 June 2001	The County of Cumbria (Electoral Changes) Order 2000; The County of Cumbria (Electoral Changes) (Amendment) Order 2001	Draft report 29 June 1999 Final report November 1999
2 May 2002	The Borough of Burnley (Electoral Changes) Order 2001; The Borough of Burnley (Electoral Changes) (Amendment) Order 2002	Draft report 15 February 2000 Final report 5 September 2000
2 May 2002	The Borough of Chorley (Electoral Changes) Order 2001	Draft report 15 February 2000 Final report 5 September 2000
1 May 2003	The Borough of Fylde (Electoral Changes) Order 2001	Draft report 4 April 2000 Final report 5 September 2000
2 May 2002	The Borough of Hyndburn (Electoral Changes) Order 2001	Draft report 15 February 2000 Final report 5 September 2000
2 May 2002	The Borough of Pendle (Electoral Changes) Order 2001	Draft report 15 February 2000 Final report 5 September 2000
2 May 2002	The Borough of Preston (Electoral Changes) Order 2001	Draft report 15 February 2000 Final report 5 September 2000
1 May 2003	The Borough of Ribble Valley (Electoral Changes) Order 2001	Draft report 4 April 2000 Final report 5 September 2000
2 May 2002	The Borough of Rossendale (Electoral Changes) Order 2001	Draft report 5 February 2000 Final report 5 September 2000
1 May 2003	The Borough of South Ribble (Electoral Changes) Order 2001; The Borough of South Ribble (Electoral Changes) (Amendment) Order 2002	Draft report 4 April 2000 Final report 5 September 2000
1 May 2003	The Borough of Wyre (Electoral Changes) Order 2001	Draft report 15 February 2000 Final report 5 September 2000
1 May 2003	The City of Lancaster (Electoral Changes) Order 2001	Draft report 4 April 2000 Final report 5 September 2000
2 May 2002	The District of West Lancashire (Electoral Changes) Order 2001	Draft report 15 February 2000 Final report 5 September 2000
10 June 2004	The Borough of Blackburn with Darwen (Electoral Changes) Order 2002	Draft report 15 January 2002 Final report 6 June 2002
1 May 2003	The Borough of Blackpool (Electoral Changes) Order 2002	Draft report 9 October 2001 Final report 3 April 2002
10 June 2004	The Borough of Halton (Electoral Changes) Order 2002	Draft report May 2001 Final report November 2001
10 June 2004	The Borough of Warrington (Electoral Changes) Order 2002; The Borough of Warrington (Electoral Changes) (Amendment) Order 2003	Draft report 8 May 2001 Final report 20 November 2001
10 June 2004	The Borough of Knowsley (Electoral Changes) Order 2003	Draft report 3 September 2002 Final report 25 March 2003
10 June 2004	The Borough of Sefton (Electoral Changes) Order 2003	Draft report 3 September 2002 Final report 25 March 2003
10 June 2004	The Borough of St Helens (Electoral Changes) Order 2003	Draft report 3 September 2002 Final report 25 March 2003
10 June 2004	The Borough of Wirral (Electoral Changes) Order 2003	Draft report 3 September 2002 Final report 25 March 2003
10 June 2004	The City of Liverpool (Electoral Changes) Order 2003	Draft report 3 September 2002 (Archive); Final report 25 March 2003 (Archive)
10 June 2004	The Borough of Bolton (Electoral Changes) Order 2004	Draft report 25 February 2003 Final report 14 October 2003
10 June 2004	The Borough of Bury (Electoral Changes) Order 2004	Draft report 25 February 2003 Final report 30 September 2003
10 June 2004	The Borough of Oldham (Electoral Changes) Order 2004; The Borough of Oldham (Electoral Changes) (Amendment) Order 2005	Draft report 25 February 2003 Final report 27 August 2003
10 June 2004	The Borough of Rochdale (Electoral Changes) Order 2004; The Borough of Rochdale (Electoral Changes) (Amendment) Order 2004	Draft report 25 February 2003 Final report 27 August 2003
10 June 2004	The Borough of Stockport (Electoral Changes) Order 2004	Draft report 25 February 2003 Final report 30 September 2003
10 June 2004	The Borough of Tameside (Electoral Changes) Order 2004	Draft report 25 February 2003 Final report 27 August 2003
10 June 2004	The Borough of Trafford (Electoral Changes) Order 2004	Draft report 25 February 2003 Final report 14 October 2003
10 June 2004	The Borough of Wigan (Electoral Changes) Order 2004; The Borough of Wigan (Electoral Changes) (Amendment) Order 2005	Draft report 25 February 2003 Final report 30 September 2003
10 June 2004	The City of Manchester (Electoral Changes) Order 2004	Draft report 25 February 2003 Final report 30 September 2003
10 June 2004	The City of Salford (Electoral Changes) Order 2004	Draft report 25 February 2003 Final report 27 August 2003
5 May 2005	The County of Lancashire (Electoral Changes) Order 2005	Draft report 28 May 2003 Draft report (reissue) 2 June 2004; Final report 12 October 2004

=== Further electoral reviews by the BCfE ===
Date	Statutory Instrument	BCfE Report(s)
1 May 2008	The Borough of Barrow-in-Furness (Electoral Changes) Order 2008	Draft report November 2006 Final report August 2007
1 May 2008	The District of South Lakeland (Electoral Changes) Order 2008	Draft report November 2006 Final report August 2007

=== Further electoral reviews by the LGBCE ===
The Local Government Boundary Commission for England (or LGBCE) was established by the Local Democracy, Economic Development and Construction Act 2009 on 1 April 2010 as the successor to the BCfE. It continues to review the electoral arrangements of English local authorities on an ‘as and when’ basis.

Date	Statutory Instrument	LGBCE Report(s)
5 May 2011	The Cheshire East (Electoral Changes) Order 2011	Draft report November 2009
5 May 2011	The Cheshire West and Chester (Electoral Changes) Order 2011	Draft report November 2009
2 May 2013	The Cumbria (Electoral Changes) Order 2012	Full report July 2012
7 May 2015	The Lancaster (Electoral Changes) Order 2014	Full report October 2013
7 May 2015	The South Ribble (Electoral Changes) Order 2014	Full Report March 2014
7 May 2015	The Wyre (Electoral Changes) Order 2014	
5 May 2016	The Knowsley (Electoral Changes) Order 2015	Full Report June 2015
5 May 2016	The Warrington (Electoral Changes) Order 2016	Full Report December 2015
3 May 2018	The Blackburn with Darwen (Electoral Changes) Order 2017	Full Report August 2017
3 May 2018	The Manchester (Electoral Changes) Order 2017	Full Report April 2017
3 May 2018	The Preston (Electoral Changes) Order 2018	Full Report January 2018
3 May 2018	The South Lakeland (Electoral Changes) Order 2017	Full Report October 2016
2 May 2019	The Allerdale (Electoral Changes) Order 2017	Full Report June 2017
2 May 2019	The Carlisle (Electoral Changes) Order 2019	Full Report November 2018
2 May 2019	The Cheshire West and Chester (Electoral Changes) Order 2018	Full Report March 2018
2 May 2019	The Copeland (Electoral Changes) Order 2018	Full Report August 2018
6 May 2021	The Salford (Electoral Changes) Order 2019	Full Report March 2019
5 May 2022	The Rochdale (Electoral Changes) Order 2021	Full Report May 2021
5 May 2022	The St Helens (Electoral Changes) Order 2021	Full Report June 2021
5 May 2022	The Bury (Electoral Changes) Order 2022	Full Report November 2021
4 May 2023	The Tameside (Electoral Changes) Order 2022	Full Report November 2021
4 May 2023	The Oldham (Electoral Changes) Order 2022	Full Report November 2021
4 May 2023	The Fylde (Electoral Changes) Order 2022	Full Report November 2021
4 May 2023	The Bolton (Electoral Changes) Order 2022	Full Report January 2022
4 May 2023	The West Lancashire (Electoral Changes) Order 2022	Full Report March 2022
4 May 2023	The Stockport (Electoral Changes) Order 2022	Full Report April 2022
4 May 2023	The Wigan (Electoral Changes) Order 2022	Full Report May 2022
4 May 2023	The Trafford (Electoral Changes) Order 2022	Full Report May 2022
4 May 2023	The Lancaster (Electoral Changes) Order 2022	Full Report May 2022
4 May 2023	The Blackpool (Electoral Changes) Order 2022	Full Report July 2022
4 May 2023	The Liverpool (Electoral Changes) Order 2022	Full Report September 2022
2 May 2024	The Rossendale (Electoral Changes) Order 2024	Full Report August 2023
7 May 2026	The Sefton (Electoral Changes) Order 2024	Full Report July 2024

=== Changes resulting from parish council boundary changes ===
These orders were made to subsequent to changes to civil parish boundaries.

Date	Statutory Instrument	Cause
3 May 2007; 4 June 2009	The Preston (Electoral Changes) Order 2007	Changes to the boundaries of Grimsargh
3 May 2007; 4 June 2009	The West Lancashire (Parish Electoral Arrangements and Electoral Changes) Order 2007	Creation of Lathom South

== Structural changes ==
Date	Statutory Instrument	LGCE Report(s)
1 April 1998	The Cheshire (Boroughs of Halton and Warrington) (Structural Change) Order 1996	Draft report June 1994 Final report October 1994; Draft report September 1995 Final report December 1995
1 April 1998	The Lancashire (Boroughs of Blackburn and Blackpool) (Structural Change) Order 1996	Draft report June 1994 Final report October 1994; Draft report September 1995 Final report December 1995
1 April 2009	The Cheshire (Structural Changes) Order 2008	
1 April 2023	The Cumbria (Structural Changes) Order 2022	

Other structural reviews

- Cumbria – Draft report July 1994 Final report October 1994
- A report on the 1992-1995 Structural Review May 1995
- Overview report of 21 Districts in England September 1995
