= Bolton NHS Foundation Trust =

NHS trust

- Hospitals: Royal Bolton Hospital
- Chief executive: Fiona Noden
- Website: www.boltonft.nhs.uk

The Bolton NHS Foundation Trust is based at the Royal Bolton Hospital in Farnworth, Greater Manchester, England (Previously based just outside of Bolton town centre opposite Queen's Park). It provides NHS health care services for the people in the Metropolitan Borough of Bolton and surrounding areas. Prior to its acquisition of Foundation Trust status in October 2008, the trust was known as Bolton Hospitals NHS Trust. Bolton Hospitals integrated with some of the community services which were formerly part of Bolton Primary Care Trust in July 2011 to form Bolton NHS Foundation Trust.

Fiona Noden, formerly chief operating officer at The Christie NHS Foundation Trust, was appointed chief executive in 2020.

== Services ==
The Trust is based on several sites across the wider Metropolitan Borough of Bolton including a number of health centres and clinics, and the Royal Bolton Hospital in Farnworth.

In 2017 the trust established a subsidiary company, Integrated Facilities Management Bolton Ltd, to which 550 estates and facilities staff were transferred. The intention was to achieve VAT benefits, as well as pay bill savings, by recruiting new staff on less expensive non-NHS contracts. VAT benefits arise because NHS trusts can only claim VAT back on a small subset of goods and services they buy. The Value Added Tax Act 1994 provides a mechanism through which NHS trusts can qualify for refunds on contracted out services. In October 2018 staff of the company went on strike because they did not get the pay rise that staff directly employed by the NHS got.

== Performance ==
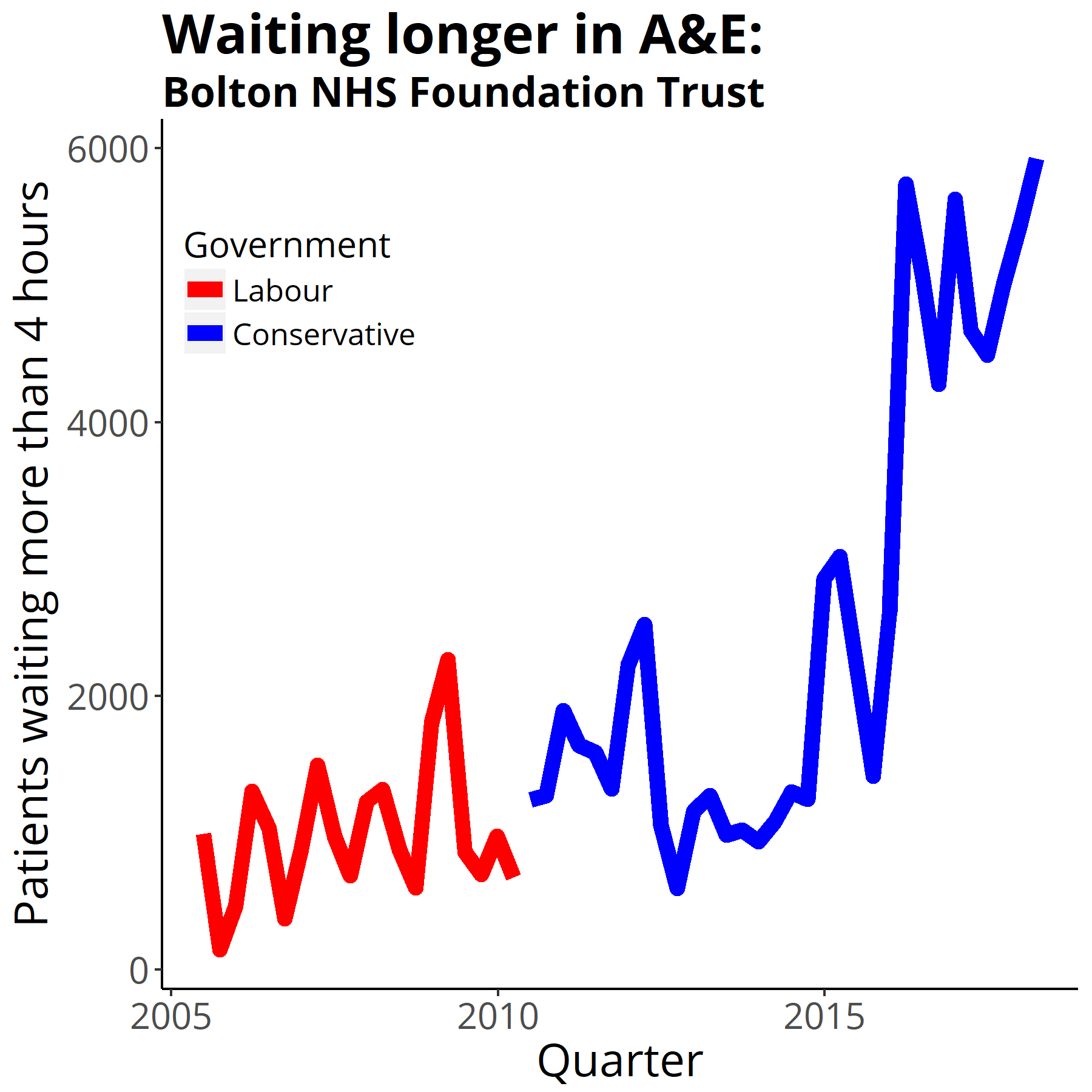
Four-hour target in the emergency department quarterly figures from NHS England Data from https://www.england.nhs.uk/statistics/statistical-work-areas/ae-waiting-times-and-activity/

It was named by the Health Service Journal as one of the top hundred NHS trusts to work for in 2015. At that time it had 4554 full-time equivalent staff and a sickness absence rate of 5.08%. 64% of staff recommend it as a place for treatment and 56% recommended it as a place to work. In May 2017 it merged its hospital and community patient administration systems, 300 million rows of data and 60 million appointments, 17 million case-note activities and 26 million waiting list entries, into one system using DXC Technology systems.

It featured prominently in a report by the Health Service Journal in 2020 on NHS trusts under "enhanced monitoring" by the General Medical Council, because of concerns from junior doctors. Reports included consultants leaving junior doctors with insufficient support and reluctance to report concerns.

== Other NHS Trusts on-site ==
Mental health services are provided by Greater Manchester Mental Health NHS Foundation Trust on the Royal Bolton Hospital site, and include wards K1-3, Maple House (Psychiatric Intensive Care), Hazelwood, Redwood and Hawthorn House. Salford Royal NHS Foundation Trust maintains a Renal Dialysis Unit on the hospital site.

Under the "Making it Better" development plan for Greater Manchester's hospitals, the Royal Bolton Hospital was one of the three sites to have specialised paediatric and neonatal services.

== Education ==
The Trust is an Associated Teaching Hospital allied to Salford Royal NHS Foundation Trust, and contributes to the training of medical students from The University of Manchester. A large number of nursing students from the University of Salford train at Bolton in each of the Adult, Child and Mental Health disciplines. A small cohort of student radiographers from the University of Salford are also based at this trust.

== See also ==
- Healthcare in Greater Manchester
- List of hospitals in England
- List of NHS trusts
