= Disappearance of Sheila Fox (1944) =

1944 missing child case in England

Sheila Fox
- Fox c. 1944
- Born: 1938; Farnworth, Lancashire, England
- Disappeared: 1944 (aged 6); Farnworth, Lancashire, England
- Status: Missing
- Known for: Missing person
- Parent(s): George Henry Fox; Miriam Ursula Fox (née Bennett)

Sheila Fox (1938– disappeared 18 August 1944) was an English girl whose disappearance at the age of six from Farnworth, Lancashire, has been called one of World War II England's most "baffling" mysteries. The case has always been treated as a missing person case, as no definitive evidence of murder, or even a body, had ever been found. The press dubbed Fox "The Girl in the Green Mac". She was the daughter of George and Miriam Fox, and the youngest of five sisters.

== Circumstances ==
Fox was last seen leaving her school at 4:00 pm in Farnworth on 18 August 1944, presumably on her way home, to which she never arrived. Companions of Fox claimed to have seen her with a man outside a bakery, where some accounts stated the pair were walking together and others stated she was sitting on the upturned crossbars of a black bicycle he was riding.

On Monday, 21 August 1944, the Manchester Evening News ran an article reporting Fox as missing. They reported that she was sitting on the crossbars of an unidentified man's bicycle. When queried, she told her friends, "I am going with him." Fox's parents reported that she was shy, so she must have known him "very well". The 1944 article reporting her missing status described Fox thus: "The girl has fair hair tied with a pink ribbon and was wearing a blue-flowered frock, green coat, brown stockings, and black shoes."

The man seen with Fox was described as a well-dressed, clean-shaven male of slim build between the ages of 25 and 30 years. The police note for the case also included the following information regarding the man's description: 5 ft 8in, "long face, sharp features, fresh complexion, clean-shaven, believed dark hair, pointed chin, believed dressed in dark black suit, collar, and tie." On Wednesday, 23 August 1944, the Manchester Evening Post reported that the man was "wearing a navy blue suit and blue and red tie".

While many of the initial leads were unhelpful, one person reported that they saw a girl matching Fox's description with a man matching the released description heading from "Four Lane Ends, down Newbrook Road, towards Atherton."

Fox's sister, Betty, recalled that there was a couple from London or the south of England, who – about three months prior to her disappearance – had commented that Sheila was "a lovely child", and "they would have liked to take her with them". Fox's parents stated that Sheila may have been attempting to meet with friends in London. Family members, greatly affected by the event, long hoped that she was still alive, as police were unable to find her body. Neighbours of the Fox family stated that their hopes later changed to speculations that the girl had been murdered.

== Investigation and aftermath ==
On the night of her disappearance, and over the following days, extensive searches for Fox were conducted in the area by both members of the police force and volunteers. Despite their efforts, police were unable to find any evidence, including the clothing she was wearing, of where she and the man had gone. Newspapers covered the story though it was soon overshadowed by the events of World War II. On Wednesday 6 September 1944, the Manchester Evening Post reported that the police were eager to speak to a man who had been spotted riding his bike with a girl on the cross bars who was wearing "a green dress and ribbons in her hair" on New Brook Road, Atherton, at the day and time that Fox went missing. According to the police, the man was seen in the vicinity of Atherton Parish Church and rode in the direction of Leigh.

An attempt was made in 1948 to link her disappearance with a "tall, thin man" wanted for stabbing two other children.

Searches for Fox were expanded in 2001, after police were notified by an individual claiming to have witnessed a 20-year-old resident, Richard Ryan, digging late at night in the area around the time she had vanished, and had long suspected foul play was involved. This tip led to the case being reopened by investigators. The location was fairly close to where she lived. Residents expressed doubts that anything would be found, as earlier maintenance of the city sewers in the area had not unearthed any remains.

Ryan (1924–1989) was living at the property at the time of the disappearance. Ryan was convicted of rape in 1950, six years after the disappearance, and was convicted of the sexual assault of a child in 1965. This site was later excavated manually by authorities in hopes of finding Fox's remains. The procedure, which began on 5 June 2001 and lasted a few days, was unsuccessful, as nothing of evidentiary value was discovered. Ryan's son stated he had no knowledge of any circumstances requiring a police search.

== See also ==
- List of people who disappeared mysteriously (1910–1970)
