= Municipal Borough of Farnworth =

Local government district in Lancashire, England

Coordinates: 53.5452°N 2.3999°W

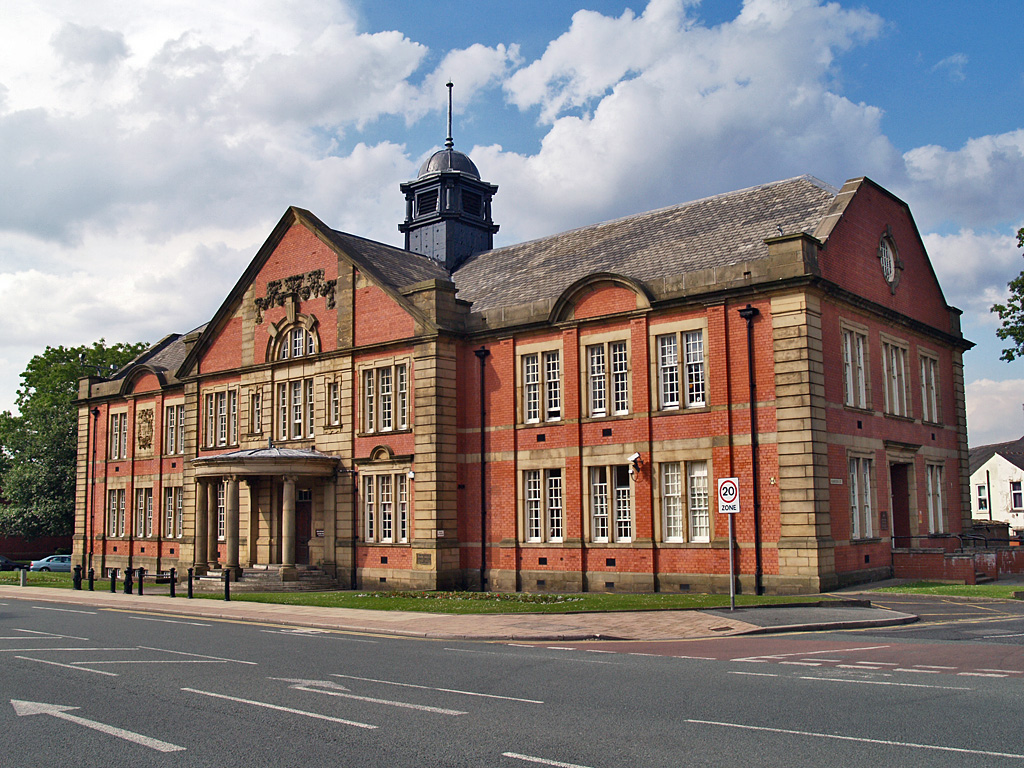
- Farnworth Town Hall
- Area
  - 1911: 1,504 acres (6.1 km^{2})
  - 1961: 1,503 acres (6.1 km^{2})
- Population
  - 1901: 25,925
  - 1971: 28,862
- History
  - Created: 1863
  - Abolished: 1974
  - Succeeded by: Metropolitan Borough of Bolton
- Status: Local board (1863–1899); Urban district (1899–1939); Municipal borough (1939–1974)
- Government
  - HQ: Farnworth Town Hall
  - Motto: Latin: Juste Nec Timide (Be just and fear not)

The Municipal Borough of Farnworth was a local government district centred on the town of Farnworth in the administrative county of Lancashire, England. A local board of health had been established for Farnworth in 1863, which was reconstituted as an urban district in 1899, before being granted a charter of incorporation to become a municipal borough in 1939. Following abolition of the local authority in 1974, Farnworth became an unparished area of the Metropolitan Borough of Bolton in Greater Manchester.

== History ==
Lying within the boundaries of the historic county of Lancashire since the early 12th century, Farnworth constituted a township in the civil and ecclesiastical parish of Deane. In 1837, Farnworth became part of the Bolton Poor Law Union which took responsibility for funding the Poor Law in that Union area.

Under the Local Government Act 1858, a local board of health was adopted for the township of Farnworth in 1863. In 1866, Farnworth was also given the status of a civil parish. After the Public Health Act 1875 was passed by Parliament in that year, Farnworth Local Board of Health assumed extra duties as an urban sanitary district, although the Local Board's title did not change.

In 1899, following the implementation of the Local Government Act 1894, Farnworth Local Board was reconstituted as an elected urban district council of eighteen members. Farnworth Urban District Council had six electoral wards, each denoted by points of the compass (North, North-East, North-West, South, South-East, and South-West wards), and each represented by three councillors. In 1939, Farnworth was granted a charter of incorporation to become a municipal borough.

Under the Local Government Act 1972, the Municipal Borough of Farnworth was abolished on 1 April 1974 and its former area was transferred to Greater Manchester to become an unparished area of the Metropolitan Borough of Bolton.

== Demography ==
Population changes of Farnworth, 1891–1971

Year	Population	±%
1891	23,758	—
1901	25,925	+9.1%
1911	28,131	+8.5%

Year	Population	±%
1921	27,894	−0.8%
1931	28,717	+3.0%
1939	27,376	−4.7%

Year	Population	±%
1951	28,616	+4.5%
1961	27,502	−3.9%
1971	28,855	+4.9%

Sources: Urban Sanitary District (USD) 1891. Urban District (UD) and Municipal Borough (MB) 1901–1971.

== Lists of office holders ==
=== Chairmen of Farnworth Local Board ===
Chairmen of Farnworth Local Board, 1863–1899
Name	Party	Tenure	Notes
Alfred Barnes	Liberal	1863–1867	1st term
David Crossley	Liberal	1867–1868	
John Hindley	Conservative	1868–1869	
Alfred Topp	Liberal	1869–1870	1st term
William Barton Whittam	—	1870–1872	1st term
John Greenhalgh	—	1872–1875	
Alfred Topp	Liberal	1875–1878	2nd term. Afterwards was Chairman of Farnworth Urban District Council (1901–1904)
Alfred Barnes	Liberal	1878–1880	2nd term
William Barton Whittam	—	1880–1881	2nd term
James Nuttall	Liberal	1881–1885	
Joseph Winter	Liberal	1885–1886	
George Foster	Liberal	1886–1887	
John Clelland Clarke	Liberal	1888–1894	
Nathaniel Nicholson	Conservative	1895–1897	
Thomas Ivers	Liberal	1897–1899	

=== Chairmen of Farnworth Urban District Council ===
Chairmen of Farnworth Urban District Council, 1899–1939
Name	Party	Tenure	Notes
William Sumner	—	1899–1901	
Alfred Topp	Liberal	1901–1904	Previously Chairman of Farnworth Local Board (1869–1870, and 1875–1878)
Thomas Ivers	Liberal	1904–1906	
Thomas Stanley	Conservative	1906–1909	
Frederick Whittaker	Conservative	1909–1912	
Charles Young	Conservative	1912–1914	
William Boyes Richardson	Liberal	1914–1915	
James Stones	Conservative	1915–1919	
John Chadwick	Conservative	1919–1921	
Charles Strathnairn Jackson	Labour	1921–1923	
Richard Henry Cunliffe	Liberal	1923–1925	
Thomas White	Conservative	1925–1926	
Walter Robert Winter	Labour	1926–1928	
Harry Barnes	Labour	1928–1930	
The Rev. John Wilcockson	Labour	1930–1932	Afterwards was Mayor of Farnworth (1939–1940)
George Tomlinson	Labour	1932–1933	Afterwards was Member of Parliament for Farnworth (1938–1952)
James Stevenson	Labour	1934–1936	Afterwards was Mayor of Farnworth (1940–1941)
Samuel Taylor	Liberal	1936–1937	
Alfred Jones	Labour	1938–1939	Afterwards was Mayor of Farnworth (1941–1942)

=== Mayors of the Municipal Borough of Farnworth ===
Mayors of the Municipal Borough of Farnworth, 1939–1974
Name	Party	Tenure	Notes
The Rev. John Wilcockson	Labour	1939–1940	Previously Chairman of Farnworth Urban District (1930–1932)
James Stevenson, JP	Labour	1940–1941	
Alfred Jones, JP, OBE	Labour	1941–1942	Previously Chairman of Farnworth Urban District (1938–1939)
William McManus	Labour	1942–1943	
John Heathcoate	Labour	1943–1944	
Jesse Seddon, JP, MC	Conservative	1944–1945	
Richard Ralphson	Labour	1945–1946	
Harold Greenwood Holland	Labour	1946–1947	
James Alfred Dean	Labour	1947–1949	
William Welsby	Labour	1949–1950	
John Brooks	Labour	1950–1951	
George Henry Wilson	Liberal	1951–1952	
Richard Matthews	Labour	1952–1953	
Harold Armitage	Labour	1953–1954	
Robert Neary, JP	Labour	1954–1955	
James Melville White	Labour	1955–1956	
James Wilfred Geere	Labour	1956–1957	
John Glanville Seddon	Labour	1957–1958	
George Benyon	Labour	1958–1959	
John Higgins	Labour	1959–1960	
Albert Samuel Royse, JP, MBE	Conservative	1960–1961	
Herbert Brindle	Labour	1961–1962	
Philip Smith	Labour	1962–1963	
Phillip Norfield	Labour	1963–1964	
Sydney Stout	Labour	1964–1965	
George Kenyon Brown	Labour	1965–1966	
Norman Topping	Labour	1966–1967	
Charles Brendan Callaghan	Labour	1967–1968	
Lawrence Francis Cunliffe	Labour	1968–1969	
Joseph Wild	Labour	1969–1970	
Leonard Haslam	Labour	1970–1971	
William Hardman	Labour	1971–1972	
Elizabeth Brown	Labour	1972–1973	
Joseph Kenneth Flanagan	Labour	1973–1974	

== Neighbouring districts ==
The Municipal Borough of Farnworth was surrounded to the north and west by the County Borough of Bolton, to the northeast by Little Lever Urban District, to the southeast by Kearsley Urban District, and to the south by Little Hulton Urban District until 1933, then by Worsley Urban District.

== Notable people ==
- Sheila Fox, child who mysteriously disappeared in 1944
- Peter Kay, comedian
