= Royal Bolton Hospital =

- Bolton NHS Foundation Trust
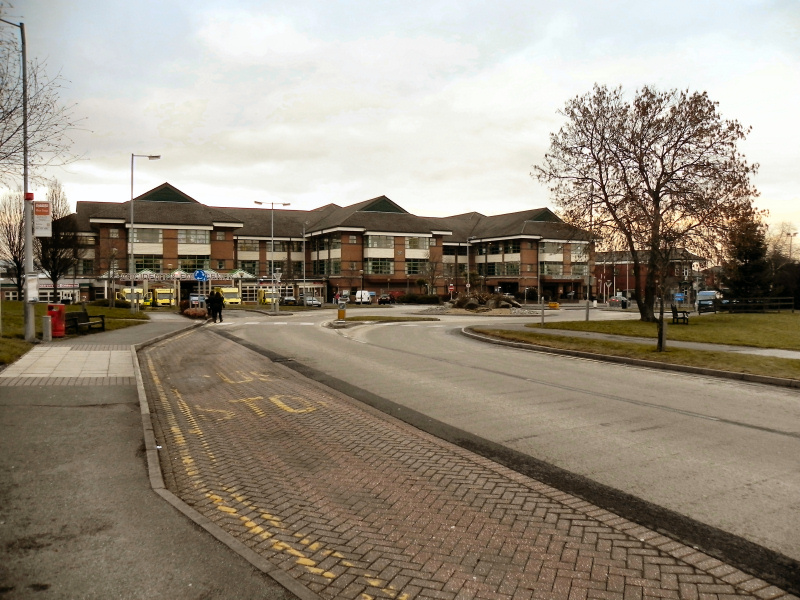
- Royal Bolton Hospital

- Shown in Greater Manchester

Geography
- Location: Farnworth, Bolton, Greater Manchester, England
- Coordinates: 53.553957°N 2.429894°W

Organisation
- Care system: NHS England
- Type: District General

Services
- Emergency department: Yes

History
- Founded: 1872

Links
- Website: www.boltonft.nhs.uk

The Royal Bolton Hospital is an acute general hospital in Farnworth, Bolton, Greater Manchester. It is managed by the Bolton NHS Foundation Trust.

== History ==
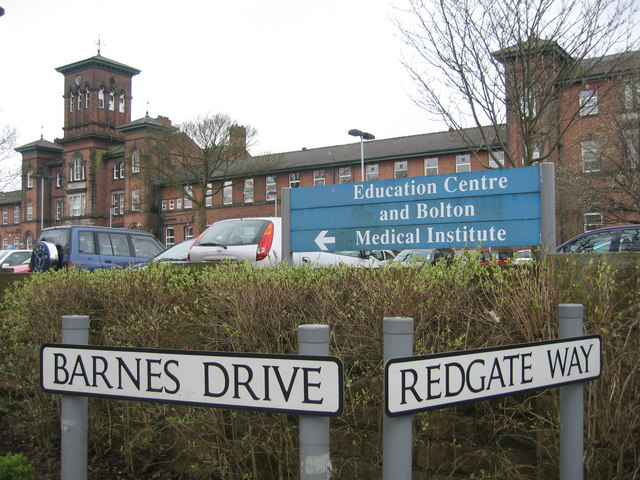
The 'Fishpool Institute' before demolition

The hospital was established as a fever hospital and built adjacent to the 'Fishpool Workhouse' in 1872.

An isolation block was added in 1893 and a purpose-built infirmary, known as Townley's Hospital, was erected on the site in 1896. The workhouse buildings, by then known as the 'Fishpool Institute', became part of the hospital in 1913.

The hospital joined the National Health Service in 1948 and became Bolton District General Hospital in 1951. After the services of the Bolton Royal Infirmary transferred to Bolton District General Hospital in 1996, the latter facility became the Royal Bolton Hospital. The old 'Fishpool Institute' buildings were demolished in 2011.

In December 2014 it was reported that the hospital had a serious backlog of maintenance problems, amounting to £24.6 million, without which the crumbling concrete structural floor supports under a urology operating theatre could give way - with "dire" consequences. The trust applied for £30 million to upgrade its premises and redesign its information technology in May 2015. The heating and air conditioning systems had reached the end of their useful life. It was given a loan of £22.5 million and a grant of £7.5 million in September 2015.

== Facilities ==
The Royal Bolton Hospital is one of the busiest NHS hospitals in the North West and was the busiest in Greater Manchester, having over 32,000 admissions, in 2007-08 year.
