= Harper Green School =

Location
- Harper Green Road; Farnworth, Greater Manchester, BL4 0DH; England; 53.550478°N 2.412335°W

Information
- Type: Academy
- Established: 1927
- Local authority: Bolton
- Department for Education URN: 143772 Tables
- Ofsted: Reports
- Headteacher: Chelsea Summerscales
- Gender: Coeducational1259
- Age: 11 to 16
- Enrolment: 1259
- Capacity: 1250
- Website: www.harper-green.bolton.sch.uk www.harper-green.bolton.sch.uk/pupil-home/ www.harper-green.bolton.sch.uk/staff-home/

Harper Green School is a coeducational secondary school located in Farnworth, Greater Manchester, England. On 1 March 2017 the school converted into an Academy along with Rivington and Blackrod High School. The school is part of Leverhulme Academy Trust.

Built around a central quad, it became comprehensive in 1982. The school is housed in a mixture of traditional and modern buildings where there are facilities for a wide range of activities and interests. Some notable students of Harper Green School in Farnworth include Ebony Hayhurst (Cisco work experience), Hollie Nuttall, and high-achieving 2025 GCSE students James Garstang, Short Ben Rothwell, Harry Heenan, Saweera Nadeem, Laila Lahadih Bareiro, and Head Student Mianda Reid.The accommodation facilities include 23 general classrooms, two music rooms, recording studio, theatre, eight ICT rooms, two dance studios, 11 science laboratories and three art and design workshops including specialist facilities for ceramics, printmaking and ICT. The sports facilities include indoor and outdoor tennis courts, large sports hall and gymnasium and playing fields including Astroturf, football and hockey pitch.

The school houses the Alan Ball Sports Hall, as well as the Peter Kay Theatre. In 2006, Peter Kay filmed a music video at Harper Green with the Scottish band Texas.

== Notable alumni ==
- Tommy Banks (footballer)
