= St James's Church of England High School =

Coordinates: 53.545°N 2.418°W

Location
- Lucas Road; Farnworth, Greater Manchester, BL4 9RU; England

Information
- Type: Academy
- Motto: Caring For Others - Achieving Excellence
- Religious affiliation: Church of England
- Local authority: Bolton
- Trust: The Bishop Fraser Trust
- Department for Education URN: 144046 Tables
- Ofsted: Reports
- Headteacher: C. Anderson
- Staff: ~150
- Gender: Coeducational
- Age: 11 to 16
- Enrolment: ~1,000
- Houses: Adams, Kenny, Peaty, and Simmonds
- Colours: Blue and Silver
- Website: http://www.st-james.bolton.sch.uk/

St James's Church of England High School is a Coeducational Church of England secondary school located on Lucas Road, Farnworth in Greater Manchester, England.

== History ==
The school was a secondary modern school. It became a comprehensive in the early 1970s, and effectively became the only school in the area when the former Farnworth Grammar School was demolished. There is also a St James C of E Primary School in Farnworth, on Hillside Avenue.

== Exam success ==
The school is continually achieving high GCSE grades, with 61% of pupils attaining the equivalent to 5 GCSEs at grade C or above. The school achieved sports college status in September 2005. The new sports area includes a dance studio, a multi-use games area (MUGA), and a sports hall. St James' is a respectable school in all areas, especially in charity work, for which they raise over £5,000 each year. The sports college status has now been removed. The school recently achieved its highest ever exam success in 2008 with 73% of pupils achieving 5 or more Grade A* to C G.C.S.Es. With 65% of pupils achieving 5 or more Grade A* to C G.C.S.Es including Maths and English. But, the school has refused to publish any results for the 2015 GCSE results. Headteacher- Mrs C. Anderson Deputy Headteacher- Mr C. Lamb Assistant Headteachers - Mrs C. Thornton, Mr A. Leigh, Mr. M Pearce, Mr D Hulme, Mrs R Iozzi, Mrs L Quarmby, Mr M. Bowden

== Ofsted outstanding ==
Following the appointment of a new headteacher, Mrs T Lewyckyj, St James was inspected by Ofsted and received an overall grade of Outstanding. This was the only secondary school in Bolton to receive this honour at the time of inspection, and places St James in the top 2% of schools nationally. This inspection is dated back in 2011. Since this inspection a new headteacher 'Mrs C. Anderson; has been appointed after Mrs T. Lewyckyj was made head of the bishop Fraser Trust which St James is a member of along with 2 other schools within the Bolton district

== Notable alumni ==
- Tom Aldred (born 1990), centre defender footballer.
- Luke Daniels (born 1988), goalkeeper footballer.
- George Miller (born 1998)), forward footballer.
- Laurence Robertson (born 1958), former MP for Tewkesbury.
- Jason Wilcox (born 1971)), football executive, former left winger footballer.
