= Chalmers Hospital, Banff =

Chalmers Hospital
- NHS Grampian
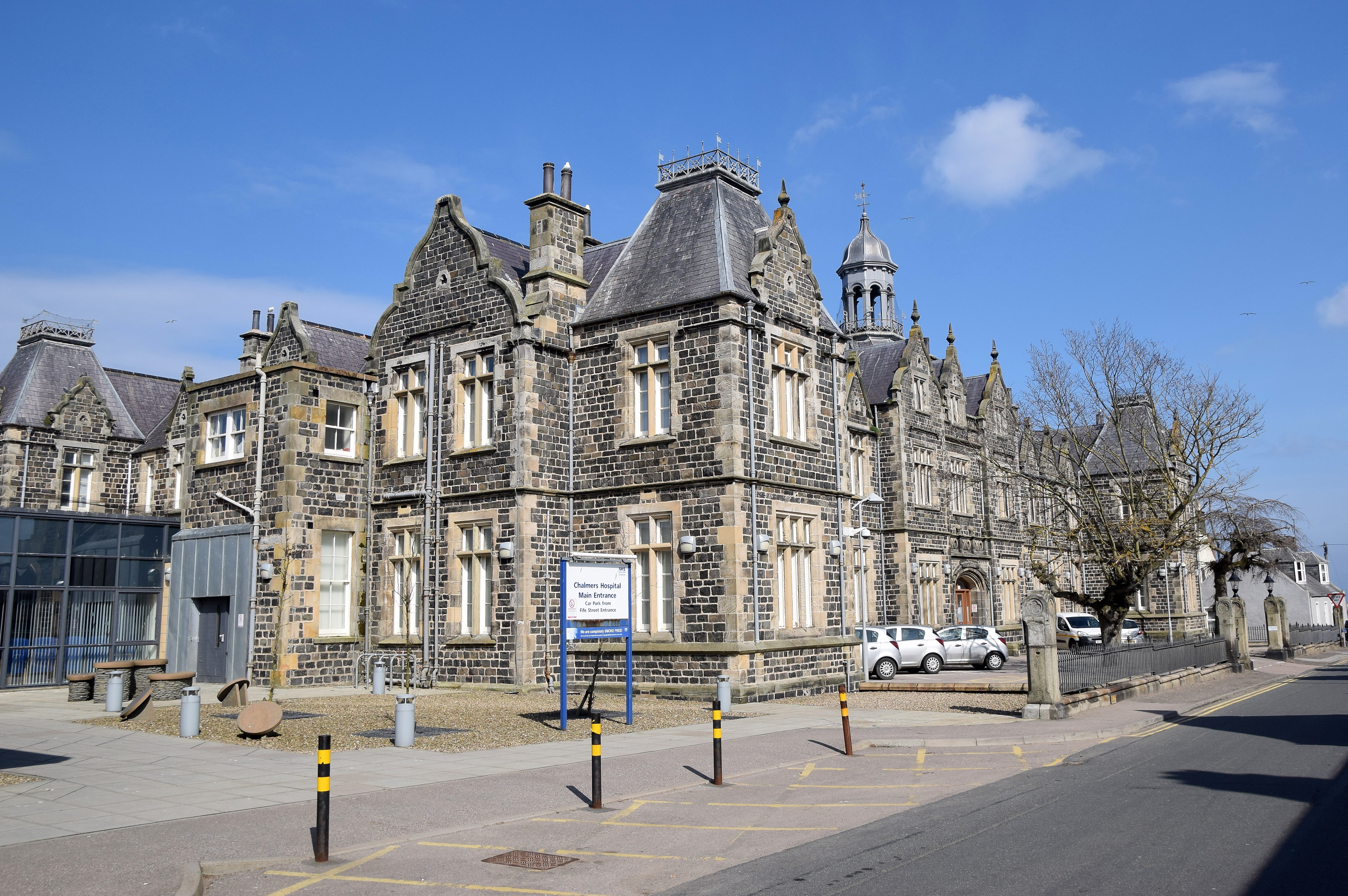
- Chalmers Hospital

- Shown in Aberdeenshire

Geography
- Location: Banff, Aberdeenshire, Scotland
- Coordinates: 57°40′10″N 2°31′24″W

Organisation
- Care system: NHS Scotland
- Type: General

Services
- Emergency department: Minor injuries unit

History
- Founded: 1864

Links
- Website: NHS Grampian - Chalmers Hospital - Banff
- Lists: Hospitals in Scotland

Chalmers Hospital is an NHS general hospital located in Banff, Scotland, a small coastal town around 46.5 miles north west of Aberdeen. The hospital is managed by NHS Grampian.

== History ==
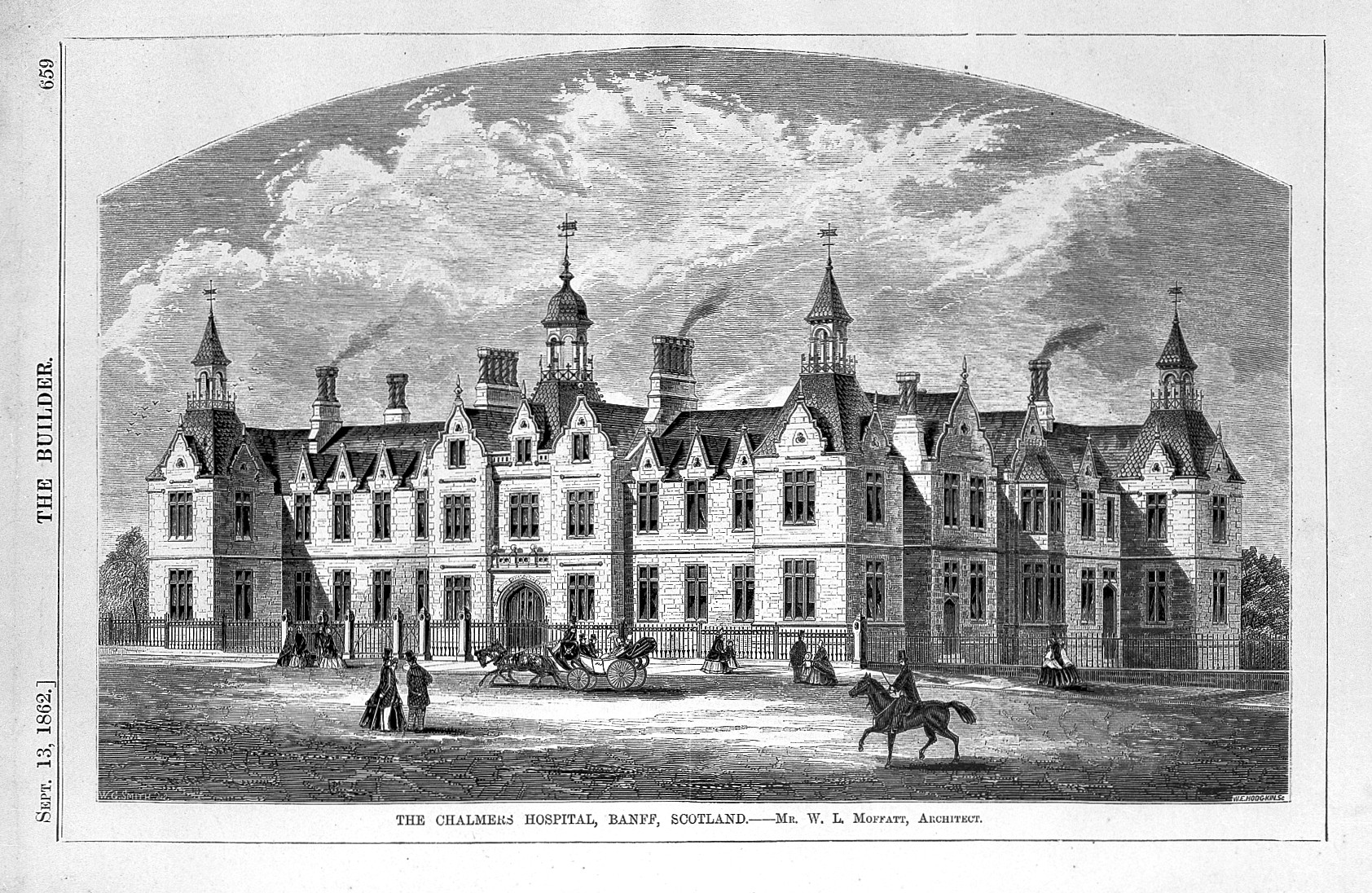
Wood engraving by W.E. Hodgkin, 1862

Chalmers Hospital was founded by Alexander Chalmers (died 11 August 1835), a merchant of Banff, who left the whole of his estate to be applied, upon the death of his wife, towards funding and building a hospital for the people in the Royal Burgh of Banff. Mrs Chalmers died in 1861, and Chalmers Hospital opened on 19 July 1864. The original 'deed of mortification' set out that this was for any destitute sick persons born, domiciled or resident in the Banff area, although in 1929 the trustees successfully petitioned for the removal of this restriction.

Some major redevelopment work began in October 2008, after the hospital attracted criticism for not being up to date, with some of the interior features having been there since the Second World War. The hospital remained open during the work, although the Findlater ward services were moved to Campbell Hospital in Portsoy until the Findlater ward was refurbished, and Seafield and Deveron ward were merged. The midwifery unit was demolished and rebuilt to provide modern facilities. Numerous other internal changes were also made inside, including X-ray facilities being moved to a different area of the building. The redevelopment also provided upgraded facilities for physiotherapy, occupational therapy, speech and language therapy and podiatry. The completion of the redevelopment was recognised with a visit by the Princess Royal in March 2012.

== Services ==
The hospital is supported by GPs from Banff, Gamrie, Deveron, Macduff, Portsoy and Aberchirder Medical Practices. It has a 24-hour Minor injuries unit.
