= Dean Brook =

River in Greater Manchester, England

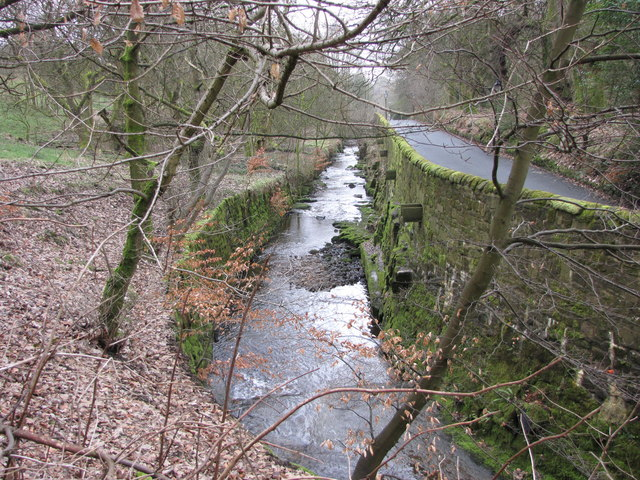
- Dean Brook flowing through Barrow Bridge towards Smithills.

Location
- Country: England

Physical characteristics
- Source
  - location: Smithills Moor
- Mouth
  - location: Astley Brook
  - coordinates: 53°35′55.29″N 2°26′53.47″W

Dean Brook is a river in Smithills, Bolton, Greater Manchester, historically within Lancashire.

Dean Brook rises on Smithills Moor and flows in a south-easterly direction, through a deep valley called High Shores Clough. It collects Dakin's Brook at Barrow Bridge and then runs through Smithills before meeting Raveden Brook to form Astley Brook, which subsequently joins Eagley Brook and forms the River Tonge.

The Dean Brook in Smithills, Bolton, should not be confused with a different Dean Brook, which rises on the north-facing slopes of Rivington Moor, flows in a westerly direction just north of Rivington, Lancashire, and empties into Upper Rivington Reservoir. It should also not be confused with Deane Church Brook, also known as the Kirk Brook, which flows through Deane Church Clough in the west of Bolton.

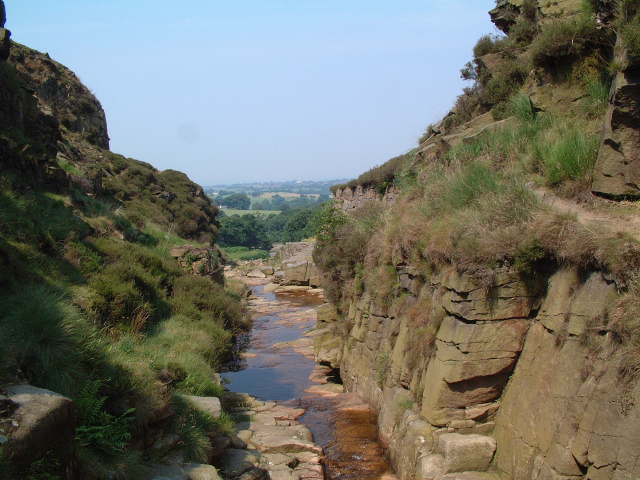
The Rivington Dean Brook
