= Smithills Hall =

Listed building in Greater Manchester, England

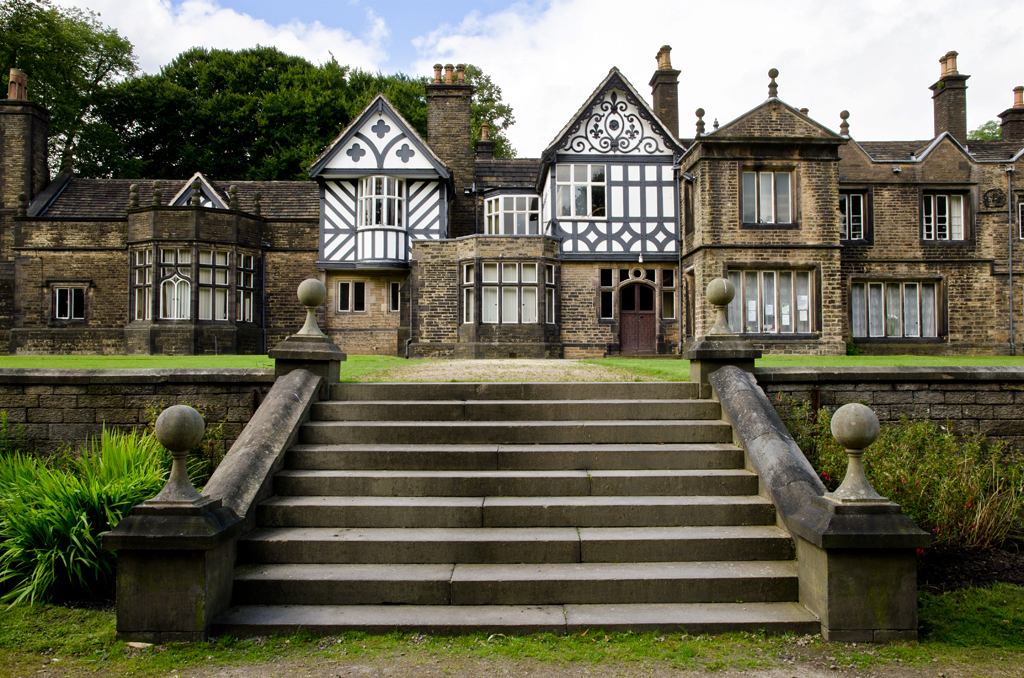
- Smithills Hall

- Location of Smithills Hall in Greater Manchester
- 53.6025°N 2.4555°W
- Type: Manor house
- Location: Smithills, Greater Manchester, England

History
- Built: 14th–19th century

Site notes
- Architectural style: 14th century half-timbered hall house extended several times.
- Owner: Metropolitan Borough of Bolton

Listed Building – Grade I
- Official name: Smithills Hall
- Designated: 23 April 1952
- Reference no.: 1388279

Scheduled monument
- Designated: 12 November 1991
- Reference no.: 43437

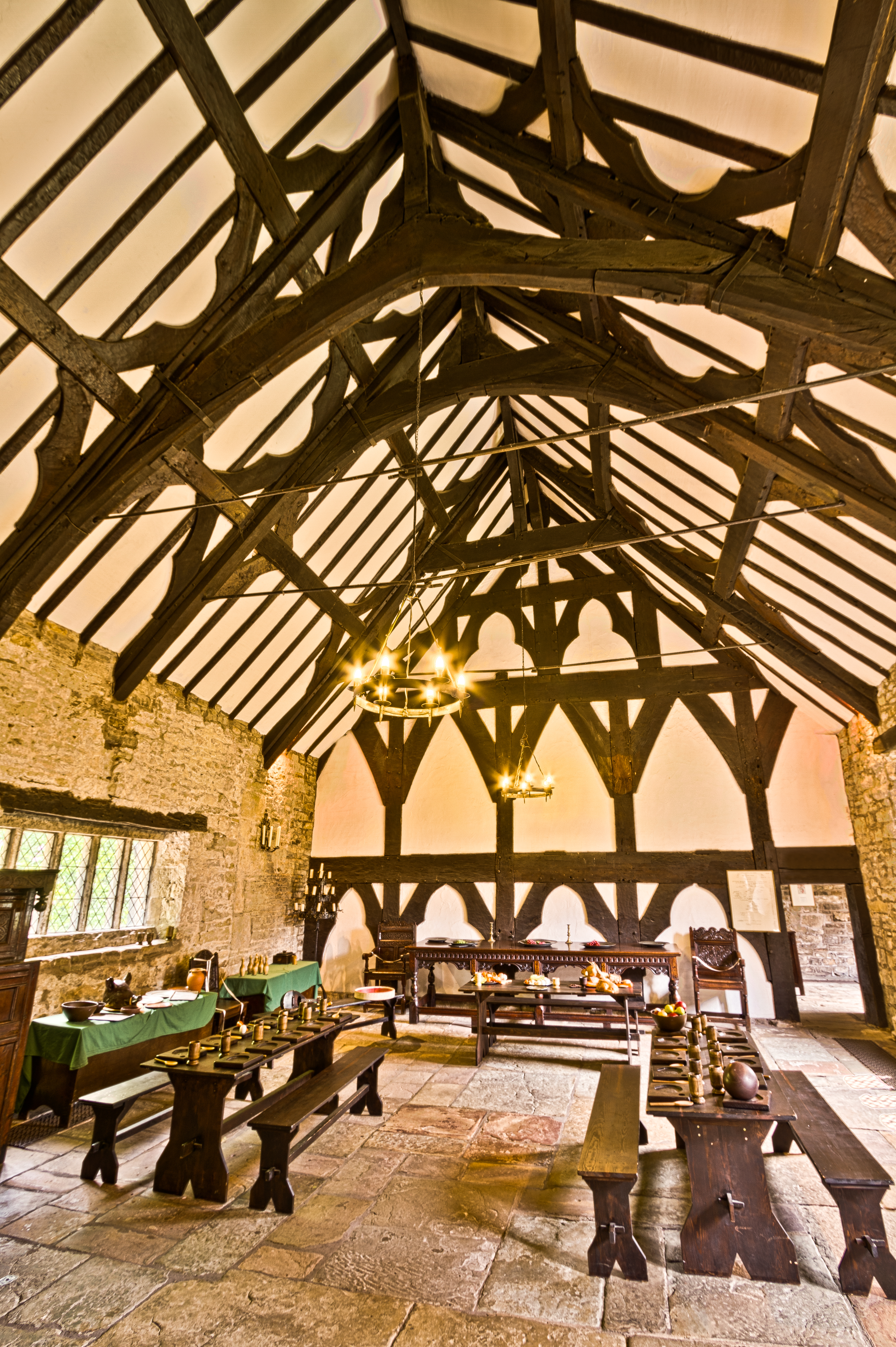
Interior of the Great Hall (hdr)

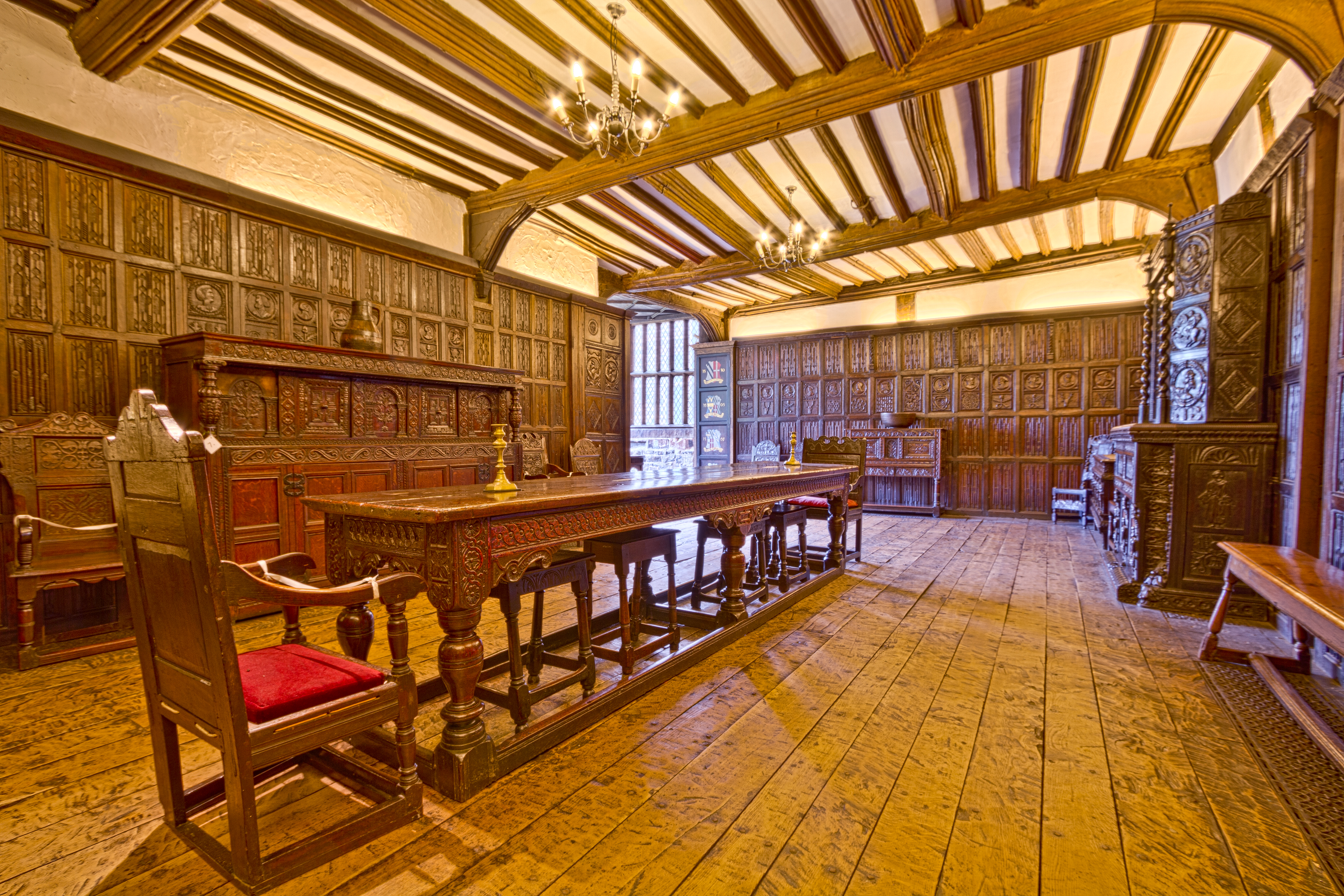
The Withdrawing Room (hdr)

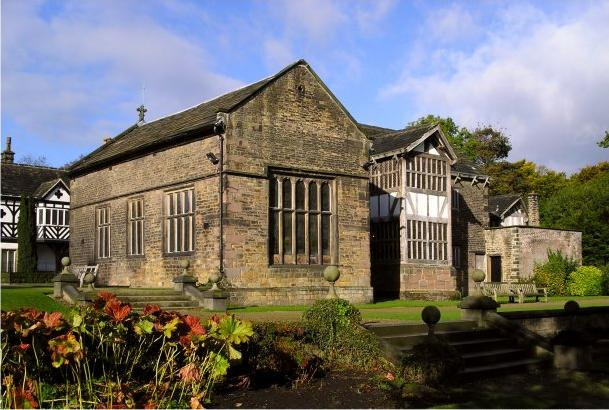
Chapel and East Range

Smithills Hall is a Grade I listed manor house, and a scheduled monument in Smithills, Bolton, Greater Manchester, England. It stands on the slopes of the West Pennine Moors above Bolton at a height of 500 feet (150 m), 3 miles (4.8 km) north west of the town centre. It occupies a defensive site near the Astley and Raveden Brooks. One of the oldest manor houses in North West England, its oldest parts, including the great hall, date from the 15th century and it has since been altered and extended, particularly the west wing. Parts of it were moated. The property is owned by Bolton Metropolitan Borough Council and open to the public.

== History ==
The name Smithills derives from the Old English smeþe meaning smooth and hyll, a hill and was recorded as Smythell in 1322. Early medieval records about the hall began in 1335 when William Radcliffe acquired the manor from the Hultons who held it from the Knights Hospitaller. On Radcliffe's death in 1369, it passed to his son and heir Sir Ralph Radcliffe, High Sheriff of Lancashire for 1384–1387 and twice MP for Lancashire. The Radciffes lived there until 1485, when the male line failed and Smithills Hall passed to the Bartons, wealthy sheep farmers who lived there for nearly 200 years.

In 1659 the hall and estate passed by marriage to the Belasyse family. In 1722 the Byroms of Manchester bought the manor and kept it until 1801 when the hall and estate were acquired by the Ainsworths, who made their fortune as the owners of bleachworks at Barrow Bridge. Around 1875 Richard Henry Ainsworth employed architect George Devey to extend and modernise the hall. In 1938 the Ainsworths sold the hall to Bolton Corporation. Parts of it became a residential home and day centre that closed in the 1990s.

The oldest parts of the hall opened as a museum in 1963, and in the 1990s, the museum was extended into some of the Victorian extensions. The west wing was restored by the council in 1999, and is currently being restored to its former Victorian grandeur. The Devey Room was fully refurbished in 2018. Since 2017, the ground floor now also houses Poppins at Smithills, a Mary Poppins themed tea room.

In 1554 George Marsh, a preacher from Deane near Bolton, was 'examined' at Smithills Hall, before being sent to Chester to be tried for heresy. He was found guilty and executed at Boughton in Chester. A footprint, supposedly left by Marsh, is said to bleed every year on the anniversary of his death (24 April).

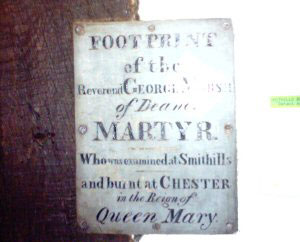
Sign claiming the footprint of George Marsh

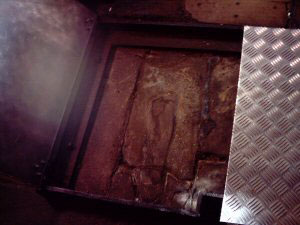
The supposed footprint

Nathaniel Hawthorne visited and described the hall when he was United States consul in Liverpool in 1855.

=== Mass trespass ===
A mass trespass of 12,000 people occurred in 1896 at Winter Hill on the route from Halliwell toward Rivington Moor in response to the hall's land owner Colonel Henry Ainsworth closing access to the moorland for his exclusive use for shooting, at what was then a vital route, Coal Pit Road, linking Bolton from Halliwell to Rivington and Horwich. The road was used by many for access to the countryside, which had become a valuable resource as an escape from the industrially polluted towns and poor living and working conditions. The public responded to the gate by breaking it down to force Colonel Ainsworth to remove obstructions. The demonstration is commemorated with a stone on Coalpit Road. It was a forerunner of the Kinder Scout mass trespass. By 1996 the road was declared a public right of way.

== Architecture ==
Smithills Hall is built on a formal terrace, surrounded on all sides by parkland on the south side of a steep-sided valley formed a tributary of the Raveden Brook.

The hall has three ranges around an open court. The oldest part of the structure is the great hall in the north range which was probably built in the early-14th century and was once surrounded by a moat. It has been altered but retains its original plan and medieval features. The oldest parts were built with timber frames and the oldest stonework is roughly coursed rubblestone. The 19th-century west wing is built in coursed, squared stone and has decorative timber framing. All the roofs are covered in stone flags.

== Park and gardens ==
The 48-hectare (120-acre) gardens and pleasure grounds are on south-facing sloping land on the edge of moorland with a steep wooded valley and lake to the north and formal gardens around the hall.

== In popular culture ==
Smithills Hall has appeared in several British television series:

- Most Haunted, episode #85 (2005)
- Great British Ghosts, series 2, episode 8 (2012)
- Mr Bloom: Here and There, series 1, episode 7: Smithills Hall (2015)

== See also ==
- Grade I listed buildings in Greater Manchester
- Scheduled Monuments in Greater Manchester
- Listed buildings in Bolton
- Petrosomatoglyph
