= Jumbles Reservoir =

Reservoir in North West England

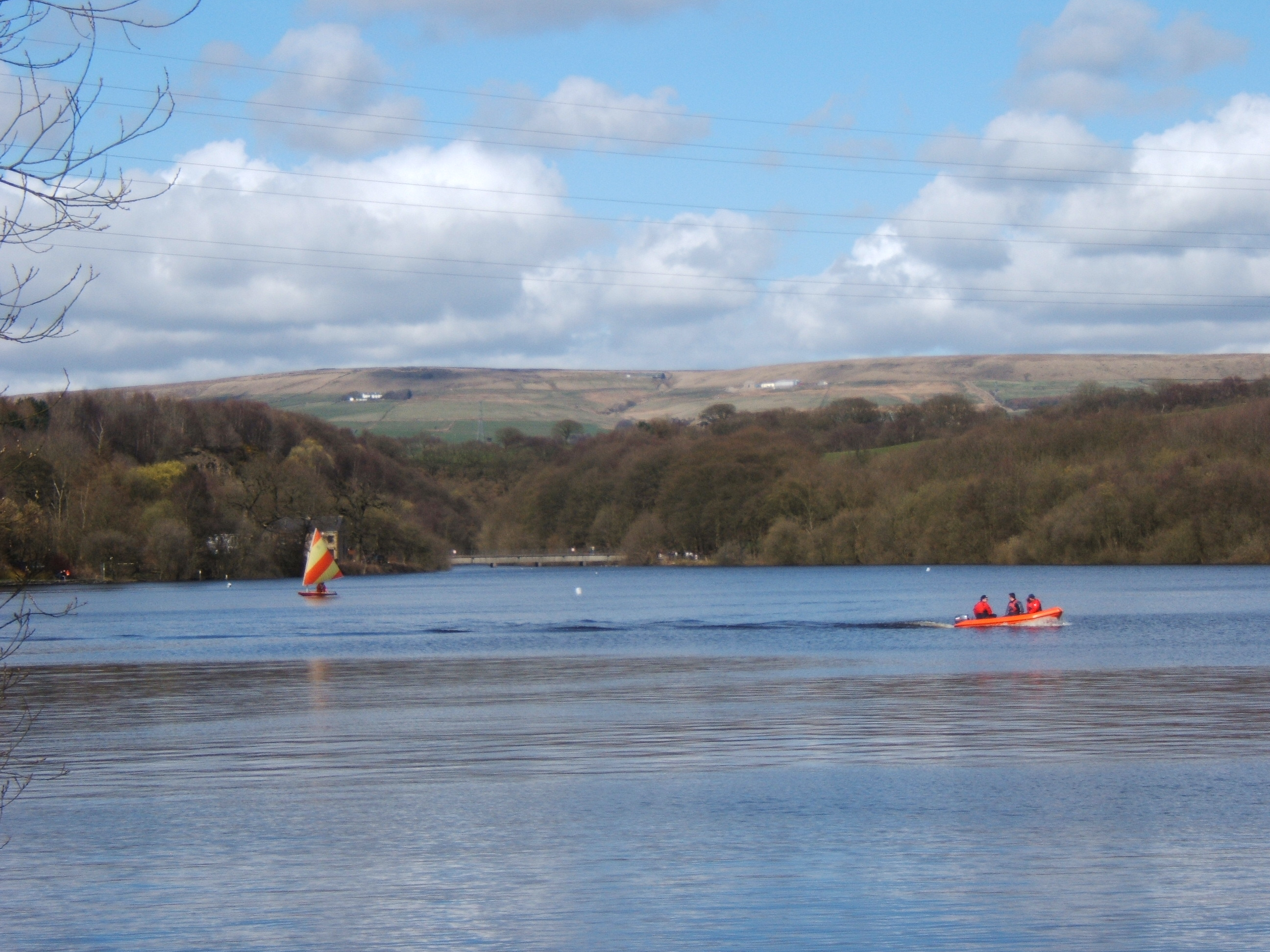
- The Jumbles Reservoir

- Location within Greater Manchester
- Location: Greater Manchester, England
- Coordinates: 53°37′31″N 2°24′9″W

The Jumbles Reservoir is a heavily modified, high alkalinity, shallow reservoir in North West England. It lies in Jumbles Country Park, in the valley of Bradshaw Brook, partly in the Metropolitan Borough of Bolton, Greater Manchester, and partly in Blackburn with Darwen, Lancashire. It was opened on 11 March 1971 by Queen Elizabeth II for the then Bolton Corporation Waterworks (since privatisation the reservoir is now owned by United Utilities). The reservoir's original purpose was to guarantee water for the Croal-Irwell river system and the associated industries.

At the most northernly point of the reservoir is an old disused quarry, (Jumbles Quarry) it is now flooded with water due to the presence of the reservoir therefore making it impossible to tell that it is even there.

The reservoir is home to Jumbles Sailing club, situated at the North west side. The club sails Dingys, canoes and paddle boards.

The name Jumbles appeared during the 19th century, it is a variation of dumbles; a northern term for a ravine like valley with wooded sides down which tumbles a fast flowing stream. This reservoir is also fed from the Wayoh and the Turton and Entwistle reservoirs.
