= River Croal =

River in Greater Manchester, England

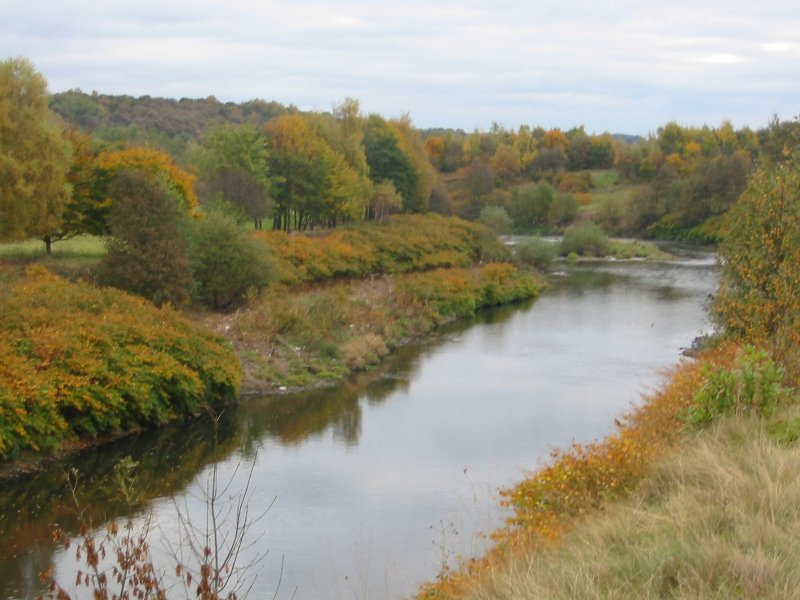
- River Croal at Little Lever

Location
- Country: England

Physical characteristics
- Source
  - location: the confluence of Middle Brook and Deane Church Brook
- Mouth
  - location: confluence with River Irwell
  - coordinates: 53°33′0″N 2°22′57″W
- Length: 10 mi (16 km)

The River Croal is a river located in Greater Manchester, England. It is a tributary of the River Irwell.

Rising at the confluence of Middle Brook and Deane Church Brook, it flows eastwards through Bolton, collecting Gilnow Brook and the larger River Tonge at Darcy Lever. Most of the river is culverted through Bolton town centre, running under Knowsley Street, Market Place and Bridge Street. Before 1836, the River Croal formed the boundary between the townships of Great and Little Bolton.

The name of the river is derived from the Old English croh and wella, the winding stream. It was possibly originally called the Middlebrook along its entire length as early references mention the Mikelbrok, (mycel and broc), the great stream but not the Croal.

It meets the Irwell at Nob End, Kearsley after a total course of around ten miles.

== Tributaries ==
- Doe Hey Brook (R)
  - Will Hill Brook
- Blackshaw Brook (L)
- River Tonge
  - Bradshaw Brook
  - Astley Brook
  - Eagley Brook
- Middle Brook (Ls)
  - Bessy Brook
  - Knutshaw Brook (R)
- Deane Church Brook (Rs)

Next confluence upstream	River Irwell	Next confluence downstream
River Roch (East)	River Croal	River Irk (East)
