= Rumworth =

Electoral ward in Greater Manchester, England

Coordinates: 53.568°N 2.483°W

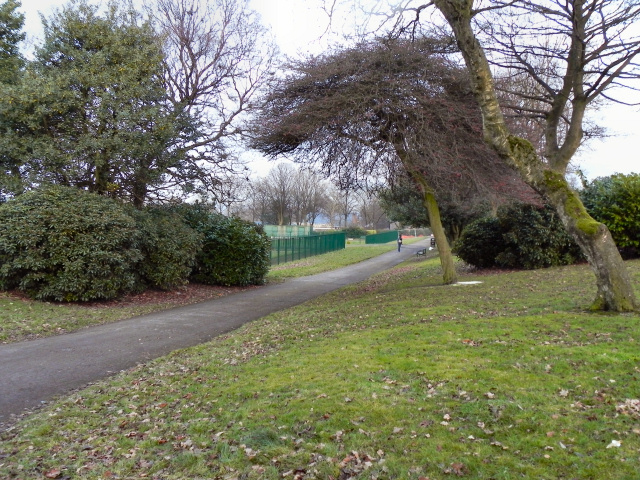
- Haslam Park

- Location within Greater Manchester
- Population: 16,250 (2011 census)
- Metropolitan borough: Bolton
- Metropolitan county: Greater Manchester
- Region: North West
- Country: England
- Sovereign state: United Kingdom
- Police: Greater Manchester
- Fire: Greater Manchester
- Ambulance: North West

Rumworth is an electoral ward of Bolton, in Greater Manchester, England. The population of this ward at the 2011 census was 16,250. Historically it was part of the hundred of Salford in Lancashire and centre of the parish of Deane which once covered roughly half of the present Metropolitan Borough of Bolton. St Mary's Church on which the parish was centred was in the township of Rumworth.

== History ==
Rumworth was recorded as Rumhworth in 1242, Rumworth in 1278, Rumwrth in 1292 and Romeworthe in 1346.

Rumworth was joined with Lostock as the third part of a knight's fee in 1212, held by the lords of the manor of Manchester. Later the Andertons of Lostock claimed a manor in Rumworth where there were fourteen oxgangs of land. The manor was bought by the Hultons of Over Hulton and it descended in this family. Sir Charles Tempest, the heir of the Andertons, had a large estate in the township. Contributors to the land tax in 1789 were Henry Blundell, who paid the largest share, Blackburne, and William Hulton.

The population in the area increased in the 19th century as a result of the coal mines and erection of a cotton-mill and of weaving sheds.

== Governance ==
Rumworth township was the centre of the ancient parish of Deane, it was the township in which the parish church was situated. It was included in Bolton Poor Law Union in 1837, in 1866 Rumworth became a separate civil parish, it became part of Bolton Rural Sanitary Authority in 1870. In 1872, Rumworth was divided into two parts; the eastern portion was added to the Borough of Bolton (Rumworth Ward), and the western part remained in Bolton Rural Sanitary Authority. In 1894, the western portion became part of Bolton Rural District, and its name was changed to 'Deane'. On 30 September 1895 the parish was abolished and merged with Bolton. In 1898, the Rural District Council was abolished, and Deane became part of Bolton County Borough Deane-cum-Lostock Ward. In 1891 the parish had a population of 6754.

== Geography ==
Rumworth measured about 2 1/2 miles from east to west and average breadth was a little over a mile, its area was 1,244 acres (5.03 km^{2}). The Church Brook flows down Deane Clough to join the River Croal, which forms the northern boundary. To the west of the township is the Rumworth Lodge Reservoir. The Bolton to Wigan road passes Deane Church and to the east the Bolton to Leigh passes through Daubhill.
