= Edgworth =

Village in Lancashire, England

Coordinates: 53.644°N 2.392°W

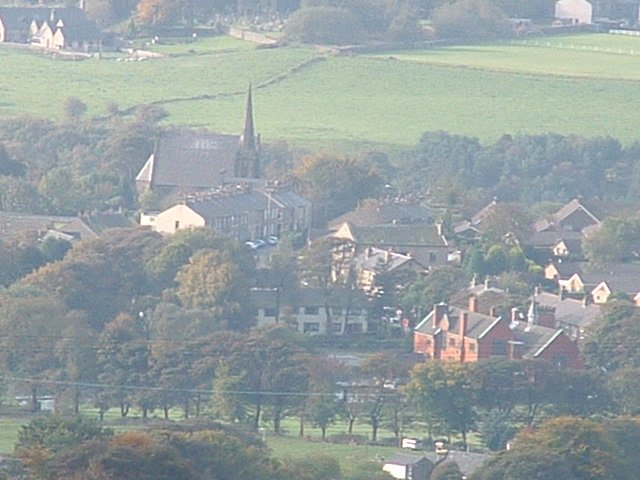
- View of Edgworth from Crowthorn

- Shown within Blackburn with Darwen Location within Lancashire
- OS grid reference: SD741168
- Civil parish: North Turton
- Unitary authority: Blackburn with Darwen
- Ceremonial county: Lancashire
- Region: North West
- Country: England
- Sovereign state: United Kingdom
- Post town: BOLTON
- Postcode district: BL7
- Dialling code: 01204
- Police: Lancashire
- Fire: Lancashire
- Ambulance: North West
- UK Parliament: Rossendale and Darwen

Edgworth is a village in the civil parish of North Turton, in the borough of Blackburn with Darwen, Lancashire, England. It is between Broadhead Brook on the west (expanded artificially to form the Wayoh Reservoir) and Quarlton Brook in the south east. The ground ranges from 650 feet (200 m) to 1,100 feet (340 m) above sea level.

The village population at the 2011 census was 2,321. Edgworth is part of the Rossendale and Darwen constituency. Andy MacNae has been the Member of Parliament for Rossendale and Darwen since 2024.

== History ==
Edgworth is of Anglo-Saxon origin, denoting a village in the hills and has had many spellings, from 'Eggwrthe' in 1212, Egewurth in 1221, and in 1277 Eggeswrth and Edgeword and Eggeworth in the year 1292. In the 19th century the preferred spelling was "Edgeworth", although "Edgworth", as used by the Post Office, is now the standard spelling.

The village is especially rich in the number of "Folds" formed in the 17th century. The title usually indicates the enclosure of a farmstead and associated cottages. Isherwood Fold, off Blackburn Road is a good example. Other examples are Horrocks Fold, Thomasson Fold and Brandwood Fold.

In 1795, an Act of Parliament was passed for enclosing Edgworth Moor "in the whole about 400 acres". It covered an area from Wall Leach Fold in the south, roughly following the old Blackburn to Manchester Road to Hob Lane with the western boundary bordering on Hill Top, Neville Fold (Moorside) and Orrells Farms, as far north as Pasture Gate Farm and with the eastern boundary following the high ground past Crowthorn, Wheatsheaf Hill and Hazelclough Farms down to Wickenlow and Hey Head.

Five small hamlets also make up the area of the village – Quarlton, Turton Bottoms at the south-east point, with Entwistle, Round Barn and Whittlestone Head to the west.

Although the character of Edgworth has always been rural, during the 19th century a number of textile mills were built around the village. Most industry has now left the area and since the 1970s a number of suburban housing developments have expanded the core of the village.

Edgeworth was formerly a township in the parish of Bolton, in 1866 Edgeworth became a separate civil parish, on 1 April 1925 the parish was abolished and merged with Turton. In 1921 the parish had a population of 2557.

=== Barlow family ===
During the 19th and early 20th centuries, the Barlow family showed great generosity to the village. The industrialist James Barlow (1821–87) funded the new Methodist Church, opened in 1863, and the children's home at Crowthorn. The Edgworth Home, opened in 1872, was the first National Children's Home and closed in 2002.

James Barlow was proprietor of textile manufacturers Barlow & Jones Ltd and was also Mayor of Bolton (1867–69). His son, Sir Thomas Barlow, was physician to Queen Victoria and Edward VII. He was created a baronet in 1902.

The Barlow Institute was built in 1909 and then consisted of a village hall, coffee bar, library and recreation grounds.

The Barlows' family home, Greenthorne, was used as a conference venue during Mahatma Gandhi's visit to Lancashire in September 1931.

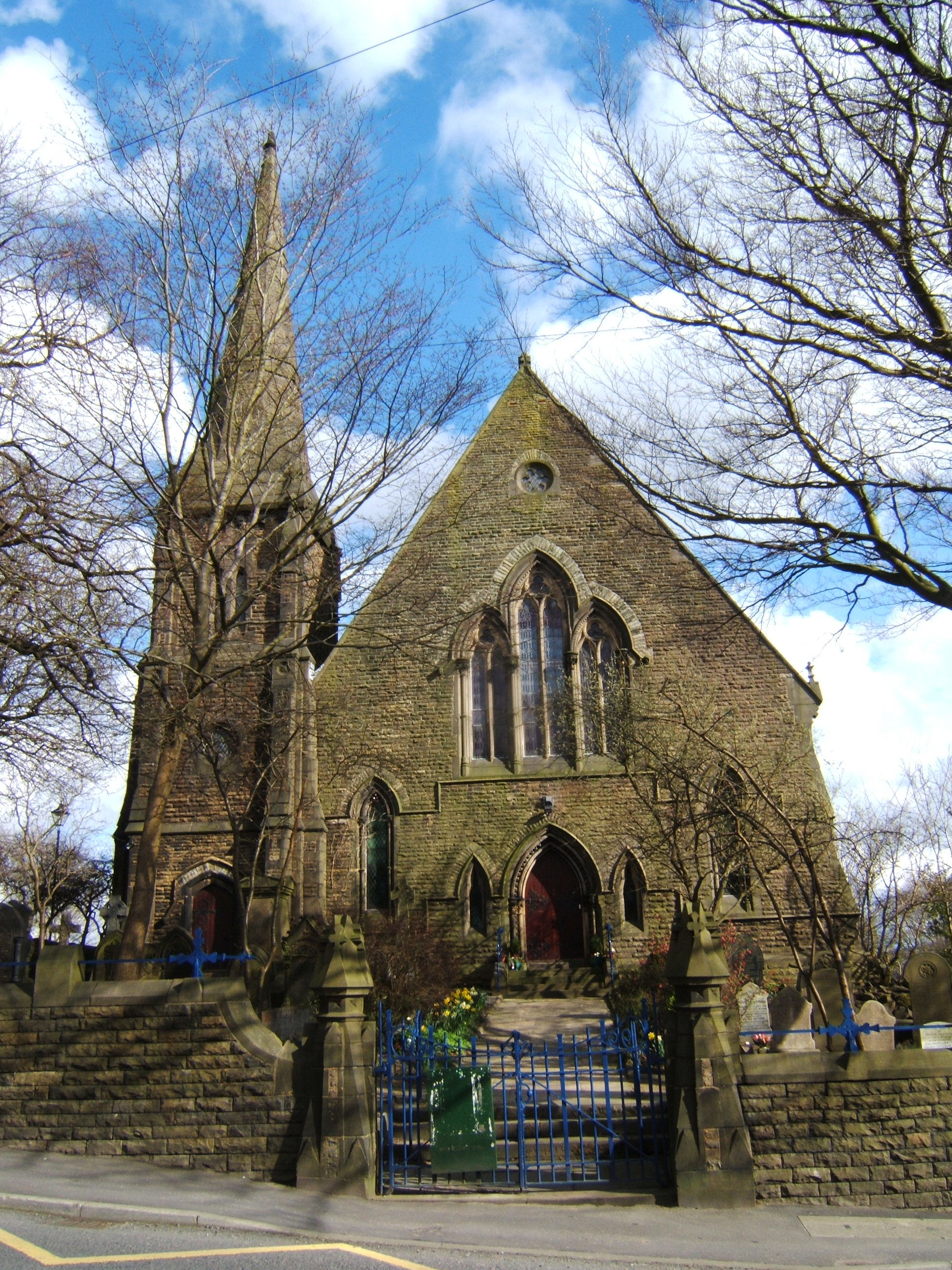
Edgworth Methodist Church.

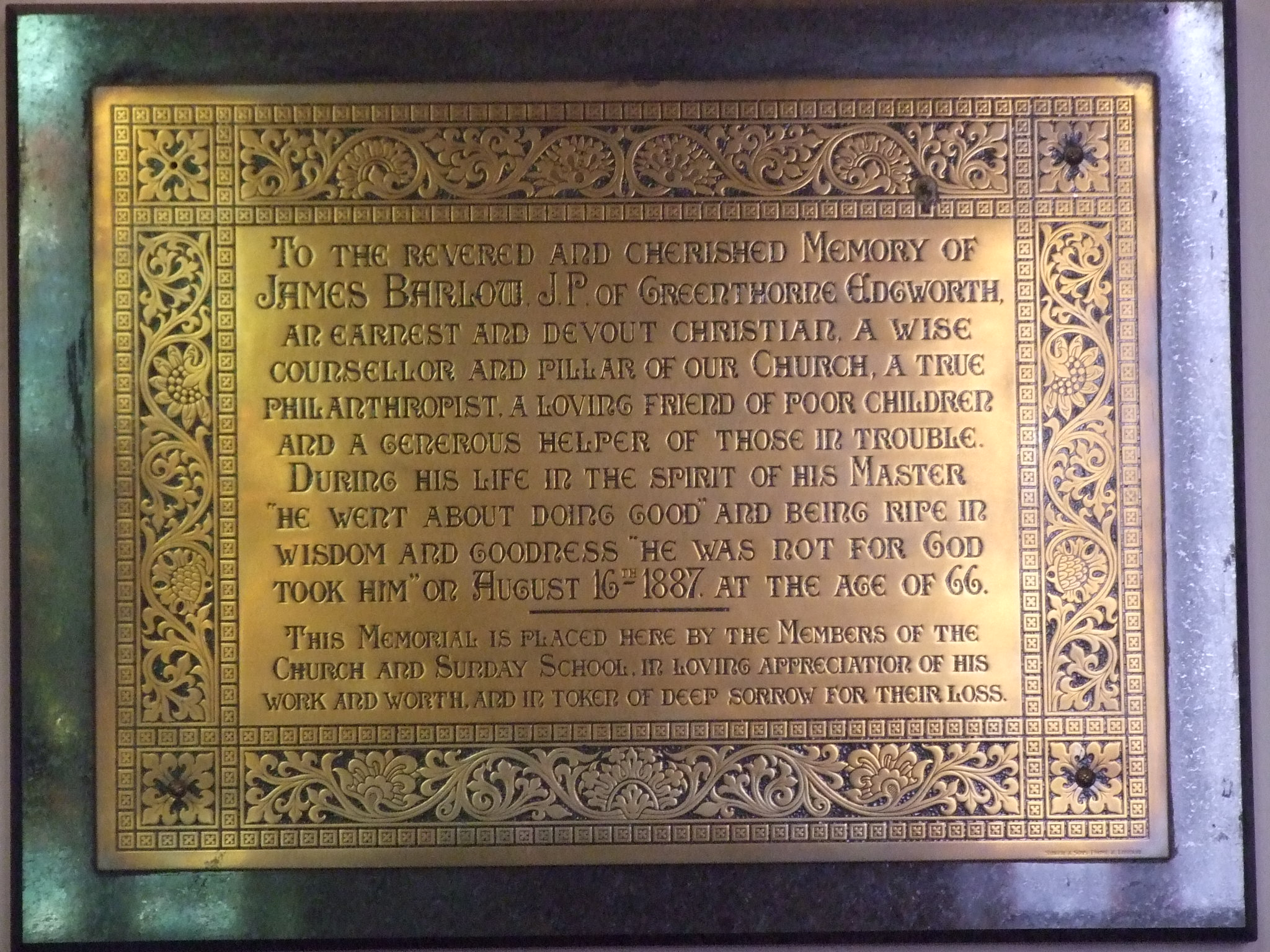
Memorial to James Barlow in Edgworth Methodist Church.

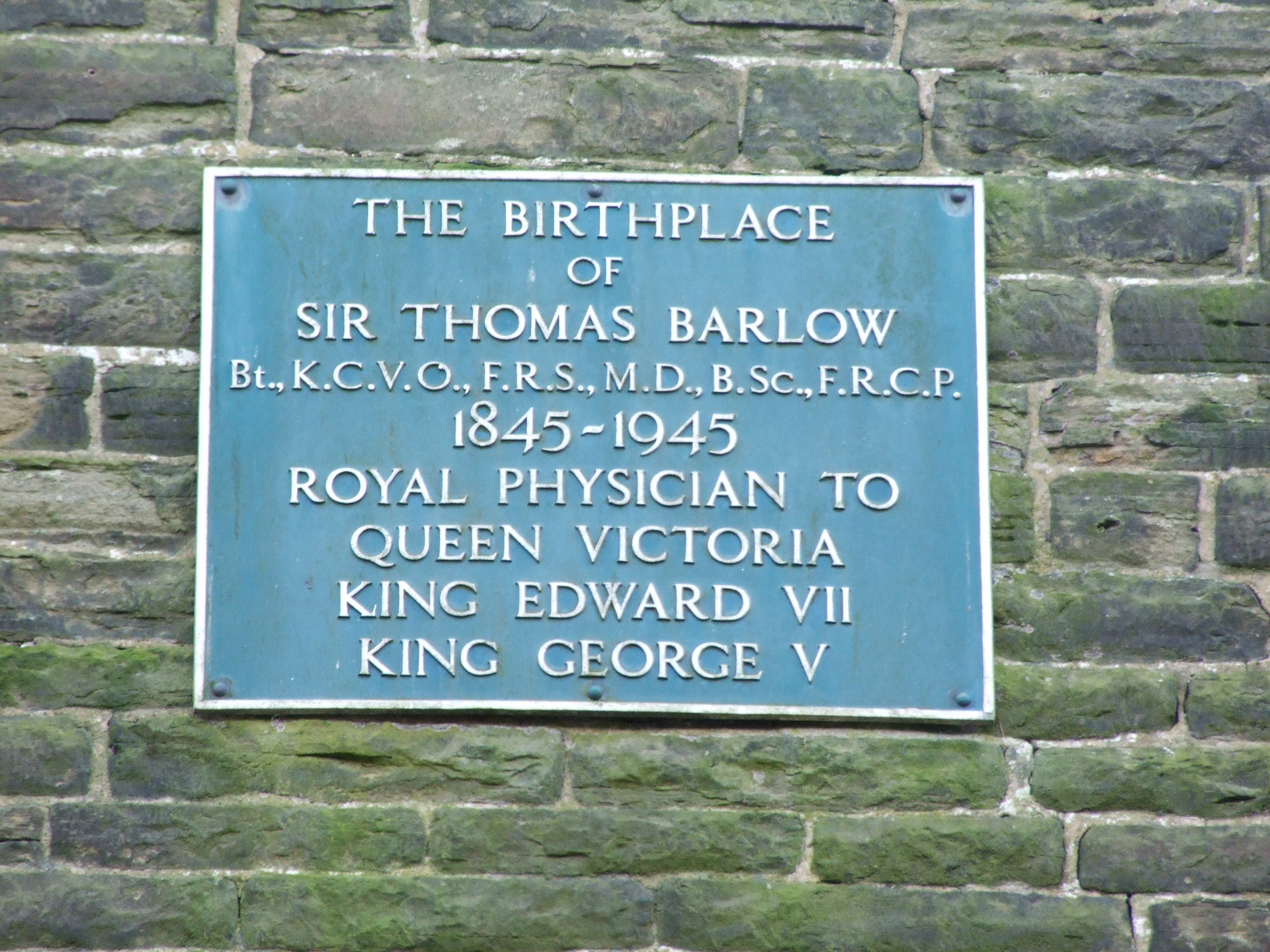
Plaque at Brandwood Fold, the Barlow family home before the building of Greenthorne.

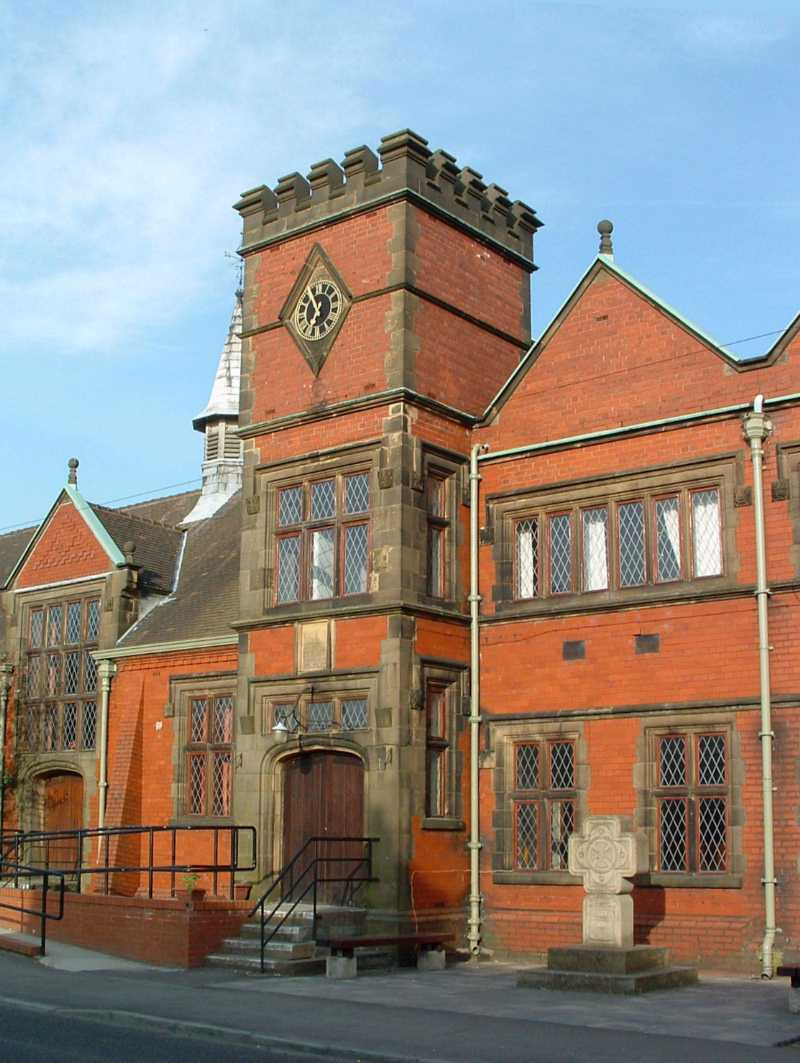
The Barlow Institute and Millennium Cross, Bolton Road, Edgworth.

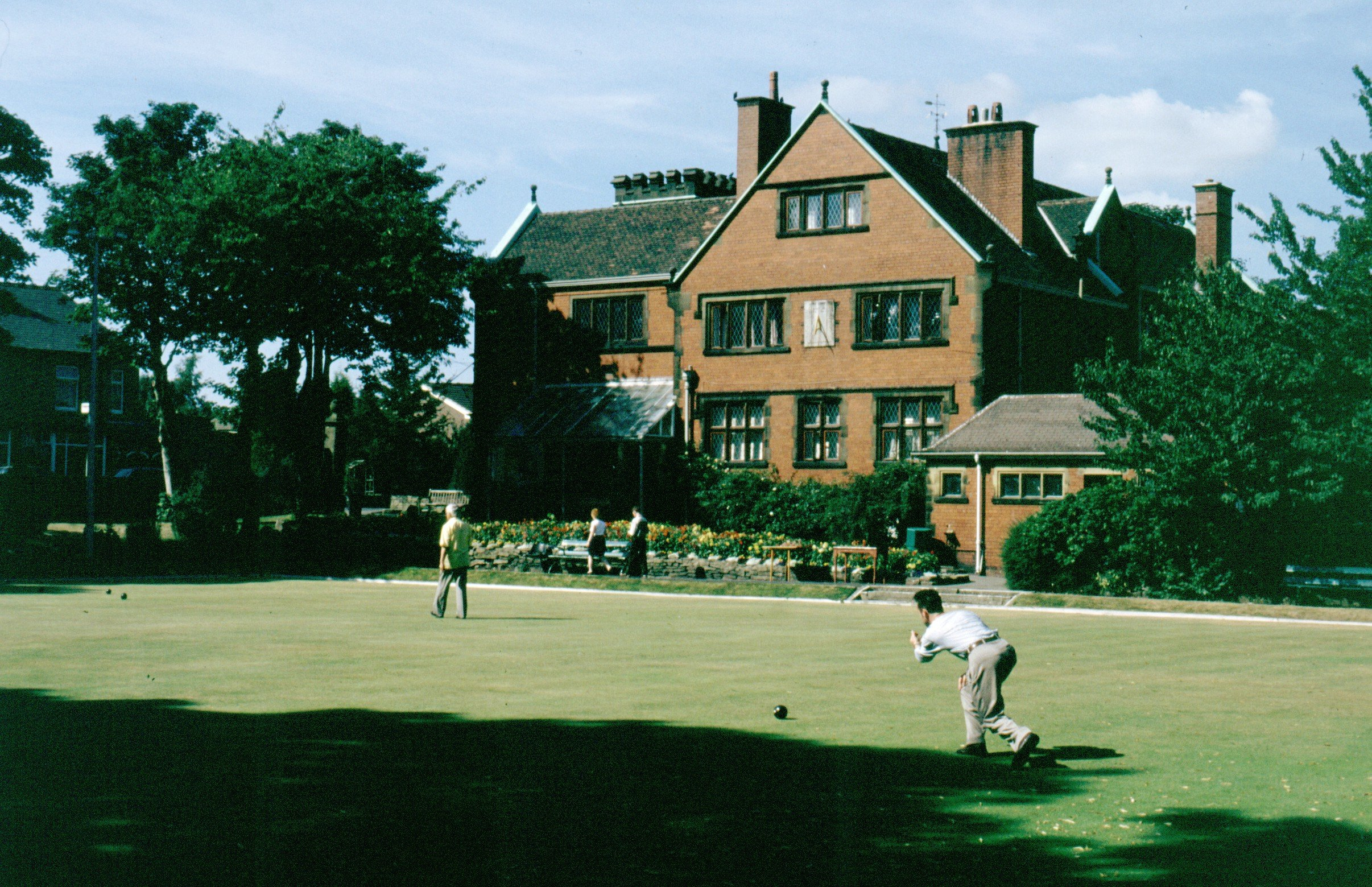
The bowling green at the Barlow Institute.

== Economy ==
Edgworth is renowned to walkers as it is very picturesque. Two large reservoirs, the Wayoh Reservoir, and the Turton and Entwistle Reservoir, are located north-east of the village, and the Jumbles Reservoir is near Turton Bottoms. They supply water to the Bolton area.

The village has many fine pubs/restaurants and Bed and Breakfast establishments.

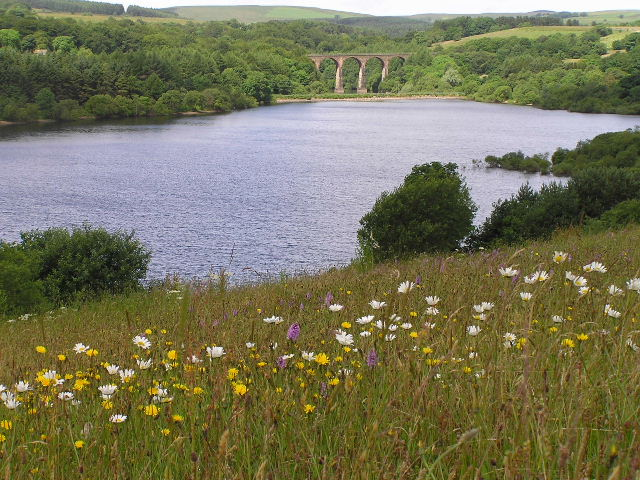
The Wayoh Reservoir looking toward the Entwistle Viaduct.

== Sports ==
Edgworth has a cricket team, Edgworth Cricket and Recreation Club, in the Greater Manchester Cricket League. Formed in 1902, they now play continuously in the season on the Recreational Ground adjacent to the Barlow.

Another successful recreational club competing in two leagues is of course the Edgworth Village Bowling Club. Founded in 1900, they play crown green bowls on the green adjacent to the Barlow.

Edgworth is also home to the oldest club in Lancashire Turton FC who currently play in the West Lancs League for open age and the Bolton and Bury Junior District Football League (BBDJFL) for its junior teams. The club has recently been awarded the prestigious Charter Status from the Lancs FA as the new Committee continue their task to turn the club's fortunes around after nearly folding in 2010

== Transport ==
As of 2024, there are only school buses and two limited bus services, the TA01 operating from Darwen to Harwood via Edgworth and the TA02 operating from Bury, Greater Manchester to Darwen via Edgworth.

The village is half an hour walk away from Entwistle railway station.

The village used to be served regularly with the 537 connecting it to Bolton but this was withdrawn by Arriva in 2013.

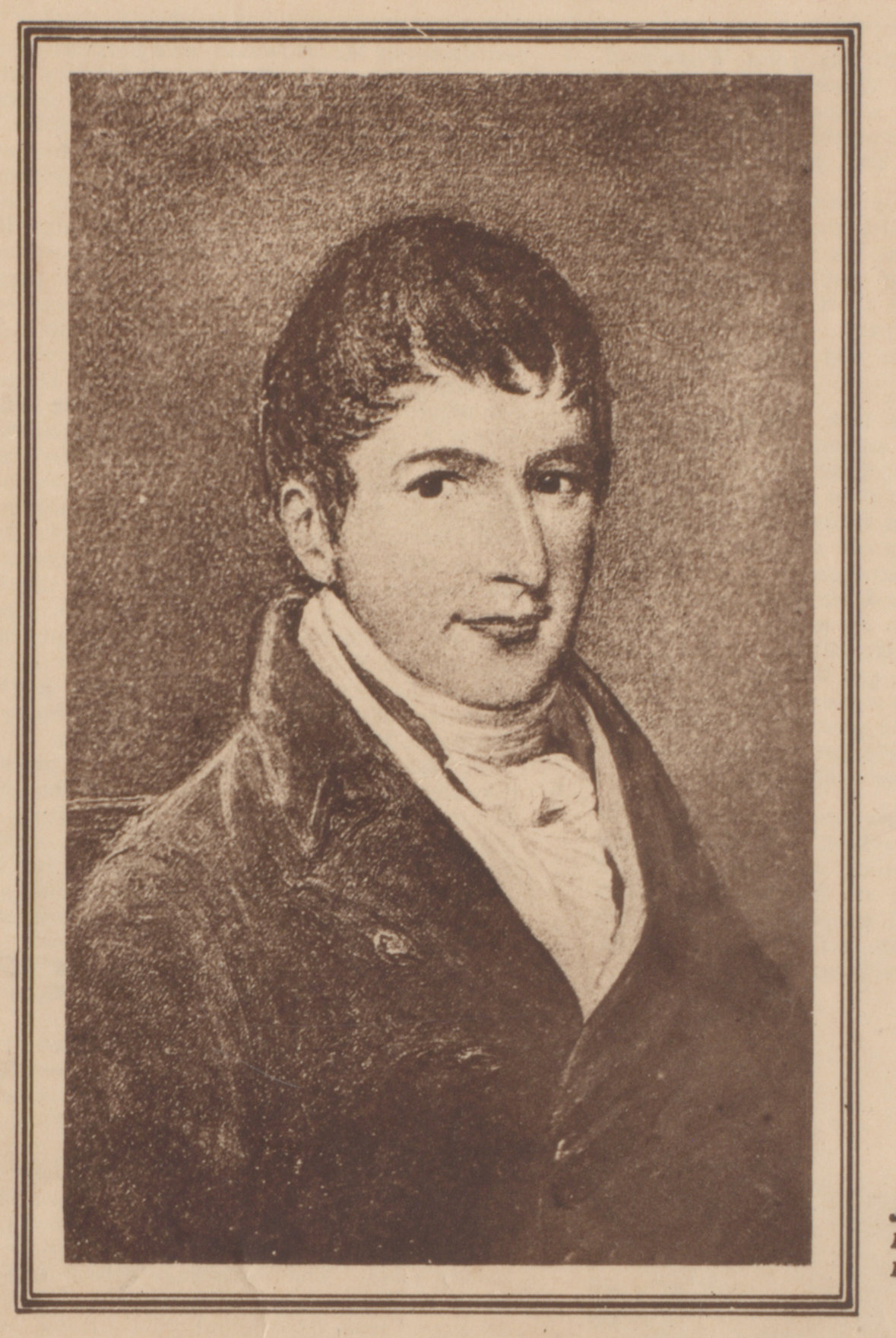
John Horrocks

== Notable people ==
- John Horrocks (1768–1804), an English cotton manufacturer and MP for Preston, 1802-1804.
- Sir Thomas Barlow, 1st Baronet (1845–1945), a British royal physician, researched infantile scurvy.
- Matt Kingsley, (1874–1960), footballer who played 229 games and 1 for England
- Charlie Sagar (1878–1919), footballer who played 216 games, 186 for Bury and 30 for Manchester United
- Sammy Winward (born 1985), actress, played Katie Sugden in the ITV soap opera Emmerdale between 2001 and 2015.
