= Belmont Reservoir =

Reservoir in Lancashire, England

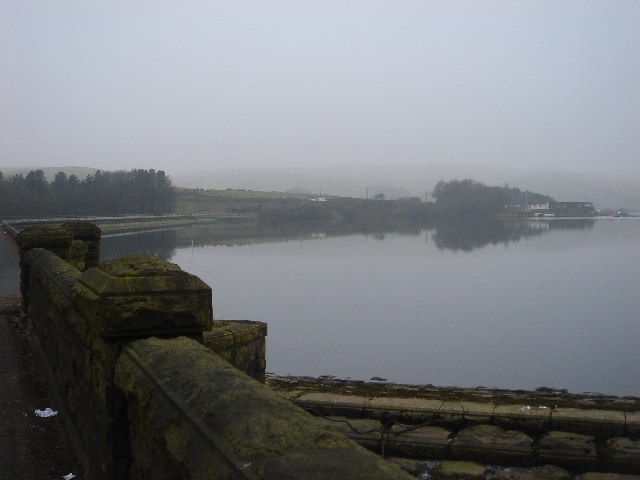
- Belmont Reservoir. Taken from near outflow, showing Bolton sailing club on promontory.

- Shown within Blackburn with Darwen
- Location: Belmont, Lancashire, England
- Coordinates: 53°38′42″N 2°29′37″W

Belmont Reservoir is a reservoir north of the small moorland village of Belmont, Lancashire, England, fed by the Belmont Brook. It was built in 1826 by the Bolton Waterworks to supply water to the rapidly expanding town of Bolton. Belmont was once a thriving industrial centre for stone quarrying and printing. The reservoir is the home of the Bolton Sailing Club. The reservoir is important to wintering wildfowl.
