= River Tonge =

River in Greater Manchester, England

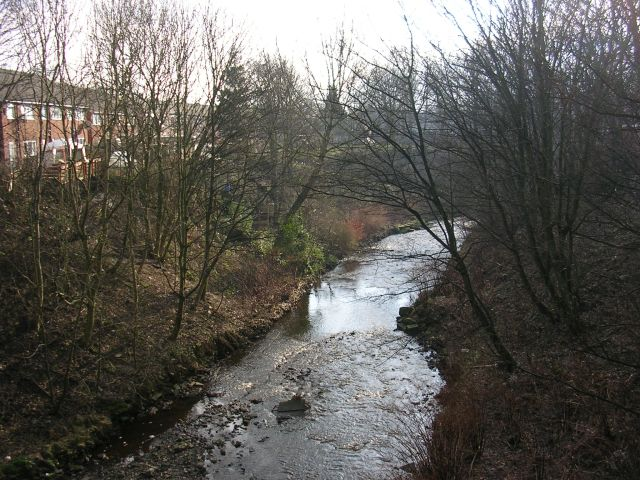
- Looking downstream from Tonge Bridge, which carries the A579 over the river

Location
- Country: England
- District: Bolton MBC

Physical characteristics
- Source
  - location: northeast Bolton
  - coordinates: 53°35′44.58″N 2°25′30.42″W
- Mouth
  - location: River Croal, southeast Bolton
  - coordinates: 53°34′1.56″N 2°24′12.96″W
- Discharge
  - location: Darcy Lever

Basin features
- Tributaries
  - left: Bradshaw Brook

The River Tonge is a short river, splitting Bolton from contiguous Tonge, both in Greater Manchester, England.

The Tonge is formed at the Meeting of the Waters, where Astley Brook, from Smithills in the west, meets the Eagley Brook drawing on more sources to the north. The Tonge meanders southwards, to the east of Bolton, past Springfield where it is joined by Bradshaw Brook, at the end of its route from the Jumbles and Wayoh reservoirs, close to Tonge Fold. The Tonge joins the smaller and thus counterintuitively superseding Croal at Darcy Lever, shortly before the Croal's confluence with the River Irwell.

Tonge Bridge section is a tract north of Tonge Bridge designated as a site of special scientific interest (SSSI). The 0.7-hectare (1.7-acre) site comprises the steep west right bank of the river. It was designated an SSSI 1987 for its geological interest, principally the fluvial sandstone which has yielded pteridosperm seeds, known as Trigonocarpus. The well preserved nature of the seeds make it of considerable sedimentological and palaeogeographic interest. It is one of only seven geological SSSIs in Greater Manchester.

In 2017, invasive walking catfish Clarias were recovered from the river.

== Tributaries ==
- Bradshaw Brook (left bank)
- Eagley Brook (left bank)
- Astley Brook (right bank)

== See also ==
Manchester Bolton & Bury Canal
