= John Longworth (businessman) =

British businessman and politician (born 1958)

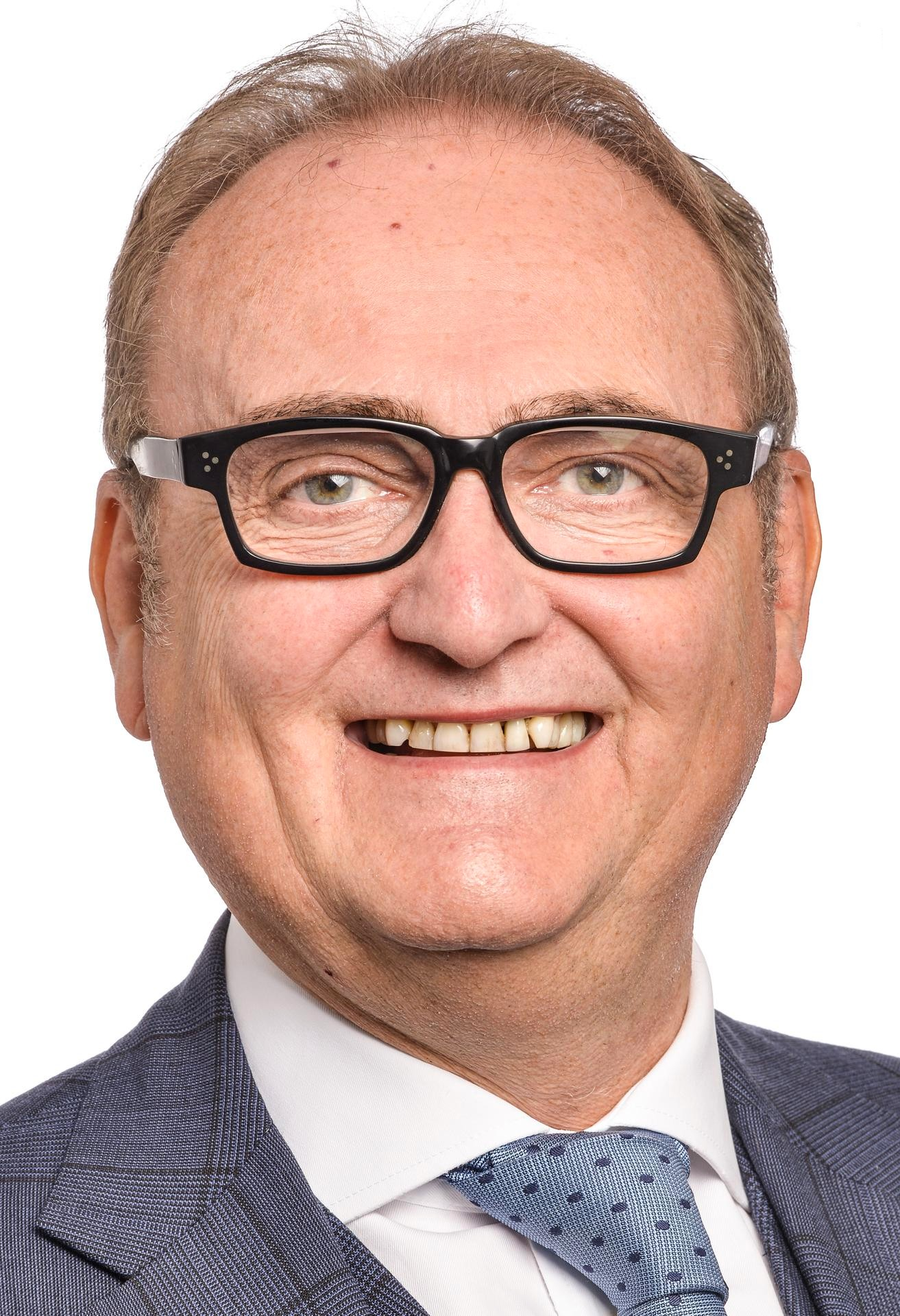
- Longworth in 2019

Member of the European Parliament for Yorkshire and the Humber
- In office 2 July 2019 – 31 January 2020
- Preceded by: Jane Collins
- Succeeded by: Constituency abolished

Personal details
- Born: 14 May 1958 (age 67) Bolton, Greater Manchester, England, United Kingdom
- Party: Conservative (since 2020)
- Other political affiliations: Independent (2019–2020); Brexit (2019)
- Education: Smithills School
- Alma mater: University of Salford
- Occupation: Businessman

John Longworth (born 14 May 1958) is a British business consultant and politician. He was the director-general of the British Chambers of Commerce from September 2011 until March 2016, when he departed in controversy by breaking with the organisation's line on Brexit on the day of its conference.

Longworth was the co-chairman of Leave Means Leave with Richard Tice. He was a Member of the European Parliament (MEP) for Yorkshire and the Humber from 2019 to 2020.

== Early life ==
John Longworth was born in May 1958 and was educated at Smithills School, Bolton, and the University of Salford, where he obtained bachelor's and master's degrees. He is a chartered company secretary and has a postgraduate certificate in microbiology.

== Career ==
A media commentator and writer, he now advises organisations in the financial sector and others and is on the Advisory Councils of Hottinger Group, the Institute of Economic Affairs and the Advisory Board of Economists for Free Trade.

In March 2016, he became the only leader of a major business group, the BCC, to back leaving the EU. Since this went against the position the BCC and its members had agreed to take on the referendum he was suspended as Director General. He subsequently resigned and volunteered to lead the business campaign to leave the EU, as chairman of the Vote Leave Business Council. In 2016, he became the co-chairman of Leave Means Leave, a lobby group set up to promote a hard Brexit. In October 2017, Longworth and Richard Tice, Treasurer and Co-Chairman of Leave Means Leave, were jointly placed at Number 90 on the list of 'The Top 100 Most Influential on the Right'.

=== Political career ===
On 15 April 2019, Longworth announced he would be standing as a candidate for the Brexit Party. In the 2019 European Parliament election, he was elected a Member of the European Parliament (MEP) for Yorkshire and the Humber. In July 2019 he became a member of the European Parliament Committee on Economic and Monetary Affairs and of the European Parliament Committee on the Internal Market and Consumer Protection. He was expelled from the Brexit Party and lost the party whip in December 2019 for "repeatedly undermining their general election strategy."

== Honours ==
He has an honorary doctorate from the private BPP University.
