= Barrow Bridge, Bolton =

Model village in Bolton, England

Coordinates: 53.6000°N 2.4697°W

Barrow Bridge
- Cottages overlooking the Dean Brook

- Location within Greater Manchester
- OS grid reference: SD685115
  - London: 224.4 mi (361.1 km) NW
- Metropolitan borough: Bolton
- Metropolitan county: Greater Manchester
- Region: North West
- Country: England
- Sovereign state: United Kingdom
- Post town: BOLTON
- Postcode district: BL1
- Dialling code: 01204
- Police: Greater Manchester
- Fire: Greater Manchester
- Ambulance: North West
- UK Parliament: Bolton West

Barrow Bridge is a model village in the north-west outskirts of Bolton in Greater Manchester, England. It was created in the Industrial Revolution but since the demolition of the mills is now a residential village.

== History ==
John and Robert Lord opened a cotton mill using water power from the Dean Brook which powered spinning mules invented by Samuel Crompton. The brothers built 13 cottages near the mill for workers. In 1830 Thomas Bazley and Richard Gardner bought and demolished the mill, replacing it with Dean Mills, twin six-storey steam powered mills situated on the east side of the brook at the entrance to the village. They created a model village for the mill workers on the hill top accessed by a flight of stone steps, with rows of cottages, a shop and an educational institute. Houses for the managers were built a short distance away, overlooking the brook. William Callender bought Dean Mill in 1861. The company went out of business after his death and the mill was demolished in 1913.

Benjamin Disraeli visited the village in 1840, it is the basis of the fictional village Millbank in his novel, Coningsby, published in 1844.

== Governance ==
Historically, the Barrow Bridge area was part of the township of Halliwell in the ancient parish of Deane. When the south-eastern part of the township became part of the Municipal Borough of Bolton in 1877 the remaining north-western area, including Barrow Bridge, became known as Halliwell Higher End until 1894 when its name was changed to Smithills.

Since 1974, Barrow Bridge has been part of the Smithills ward, one of Bolton Council's 20 electoral wards.
