= Bradshaw Brook =

River in Northern England

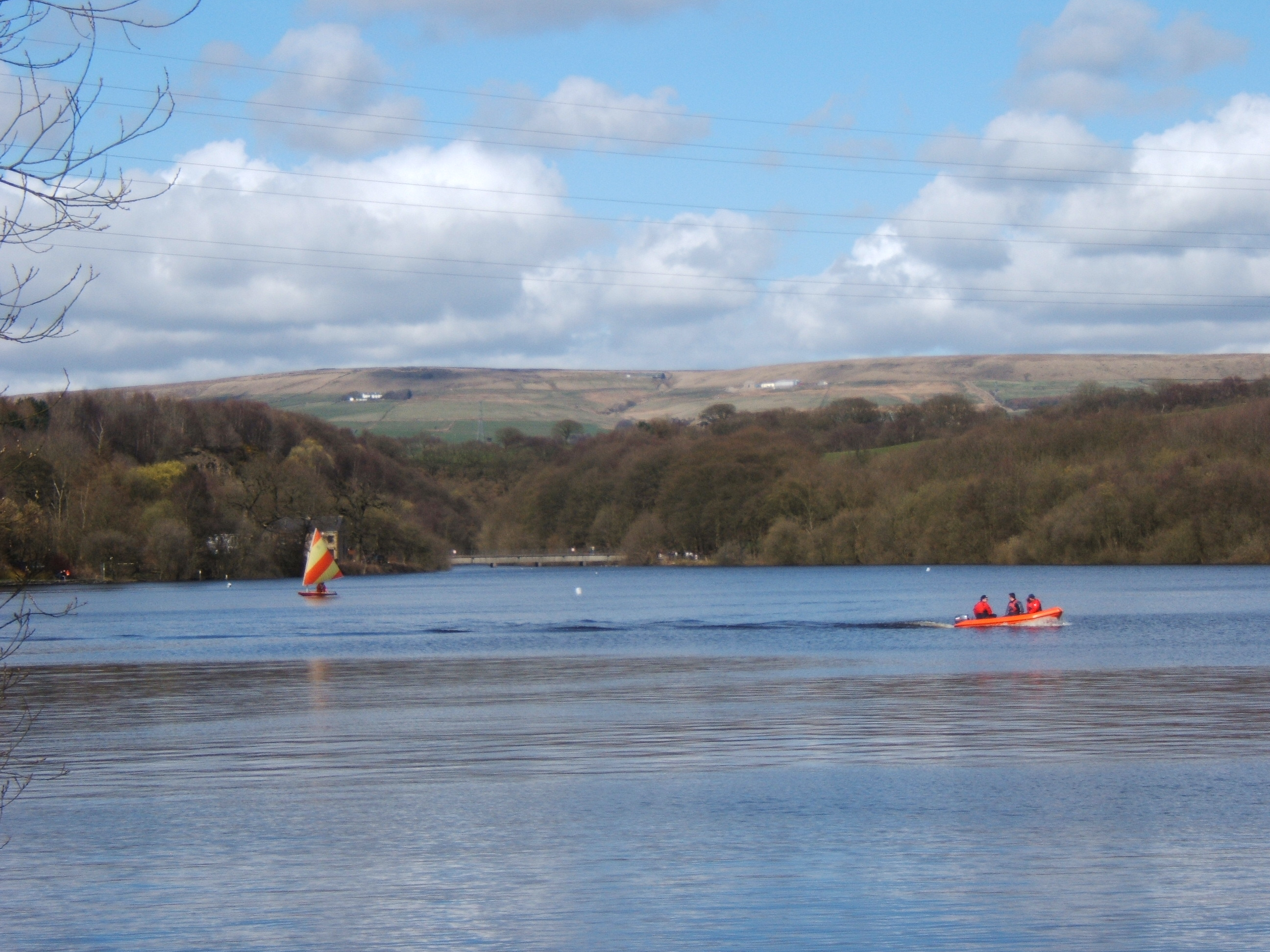
- The Jumbles Reservoir

Location
- Country: England

Physical characteristics
- Source
  - location: Lancashire
- Mouth
  - location: River Tonge, Bolton
  - coordinates: 53°34′25.42″N 2°24′17.14″W

Bradshaw Brook is a river draining parts of Lancashire and Greater Manchester in Northern England.

Starting life as Cadshaw Brook draining a valley named Green Lowe Clough on Turton Moor, the brook feeds the Turton and Entwistle Reservoir and Wayoh Reservoir (the latter also fed by Blackstone Brook and Whittlestone Head Brook). From there, the river traverses Turton Bottoms and passes Chapeltown before feeding Jumbles Reservoir (along with Hazelhurst Brook).

Bradshaw Brook then passes Bromley Cross and Bradshaw on its way to meet the River Tonge at Leverhulme Park east of Bolton.

== Local nature reserve ==
Upper Bradshaw Valley local nature reserve is in the wooded valley of Bradshaw Brook. The woodlands are native broadleaf trees and are separated by meadow areas. At the northern end is a disused quarry ⁬with pond areas. Bolton's arboretum is located at the southern end. The brook, a tributary of the River Croal, flows through the reserve from Jumbles Reservoir.

== Tributaries ==
- Riding Gate Brook (L)
- Hazelhurst Brook (R)
  - Swine Yard Brook (L)
- Billy Brook (R)
- Quarlton Brook (L)
- Broadhead Brook (L)
  - Wheatsheaf Brook (L)
  - Whittlestone Head Brook (R)
  - Naze Brook (R)
  - Higher Barn Brook (L)
  - Horse Hey Brook (R)
  - Clough Head Brook (R)
- Simms Brook (L)
- Little Moor Brook (R)
- Cadshaw Brook
  - Wilding Brook (R)
