= British Chambers of Commerce =

Representative organization in the UK

- Abbreviation: BCC
- Formation: 1860; 166 years ago
- Legal status: Not-for-profit organisation
- Purpose: Chambers of commerce in the UK, and UK business
- Location(s): Petty France; London, SW1; United Kingdom
- Members: 80,000
- Director-general: Shevaun Haviland
- Website: www.britishchambers.org.uk

The British Chambers of Commerce (BCC, formerly known prior to 1996 as the Association of British Chambers of Commerce) is the national representative body of 53 chambers of commerce across the UK. The chambers represent 50,000 businesses, which the BCC claims employ 6 million people.

== History ==
The organisation was founded in 1860 as the Association of Chambers of Commerce of the United Kingdom, following a 1859 meeting of the leaders of the Yorkshire Chambers of Commerce at the Social Science Congress in Bradford. During the 19th century, the organisation lobbied regarding a range of issues, including intellectual property law, transport, bankruptcy law, and tariffs, and promoted adopting the metric system. By 1900, it had more than 50 MPs as honorary members. In 1919, the name was changed to the Association of British Chambers of Commerce. After World War 2, the organisation lobbied for the UK to join the European trade area.

In 2016, the director-general of the organisation, John Longworth quit due his support of Brexit, when 60% of BCC members supported EU membership.

In modern times, the BCC has been regarded as less prominent than its rival, the Confederation of British Industry (CBI). In 2023, the organisation set up the Business Council as a rival to the CBI, which had faced a crisis following sexual harassment and assault allegations.

== See also ==
- Confederation of British Industry
- Federation of Small Businesses
- Make UK
- Institute of Directors
