= St Mary the Virgin's Church, Deane =

Anglican church in Bolton, England

St Mary the Virgin, Deane
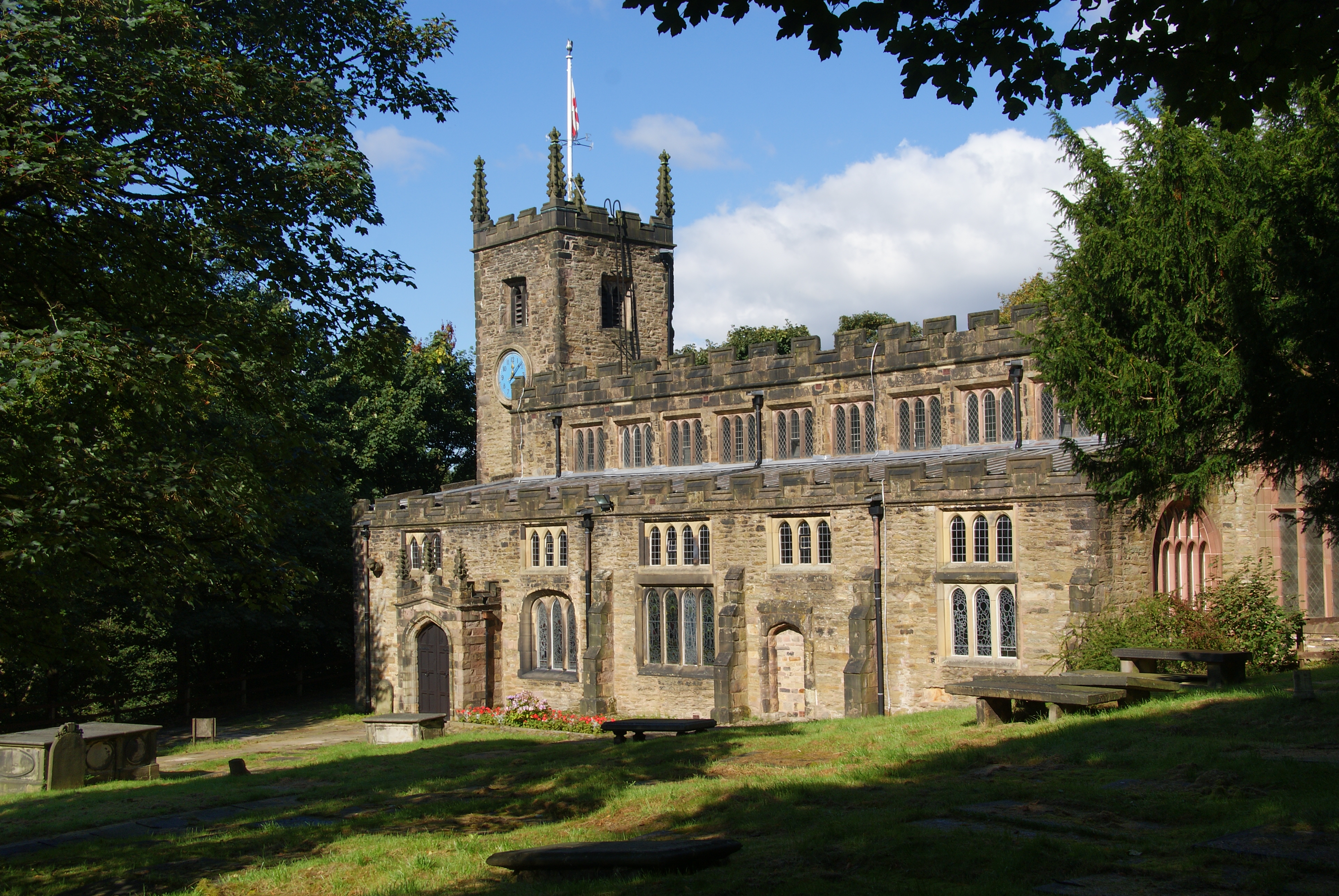
- St Mary the Virgin, Deane
- 53.5690°N 2.4644°W
- OS grid reference: SD 69337 08126
- Location: Deane, Bolton, Greater Manchester
- Country: England
- Denomination: Church of England
- Website: deanechurch.org

History
- Founded: 14th century
- Dedication: Saint Mary the Virgin

Architecture
- Functional status: Parish church
- Heritage designation: Grade II*

Specifications
- Materials: Sandstone

Administration
- Province: York
- Diocese: Manchester
- Archdeaconry: Bolton
- Deanery: Bolton
- Parish: Deane

Clergy
- Rector: Rev'd Dr Terry Clark

The Church of St Mary the Virgin, Deane, is an Anglican parish church in Deane, an area of Bolton in Greater Manchester, England. It is an active Church of England parish church within the Diocese of Manchester, forming part of the Bolton deanery and the Bolton archdeaconry. The church is a Grade II* listed building.

== History ==
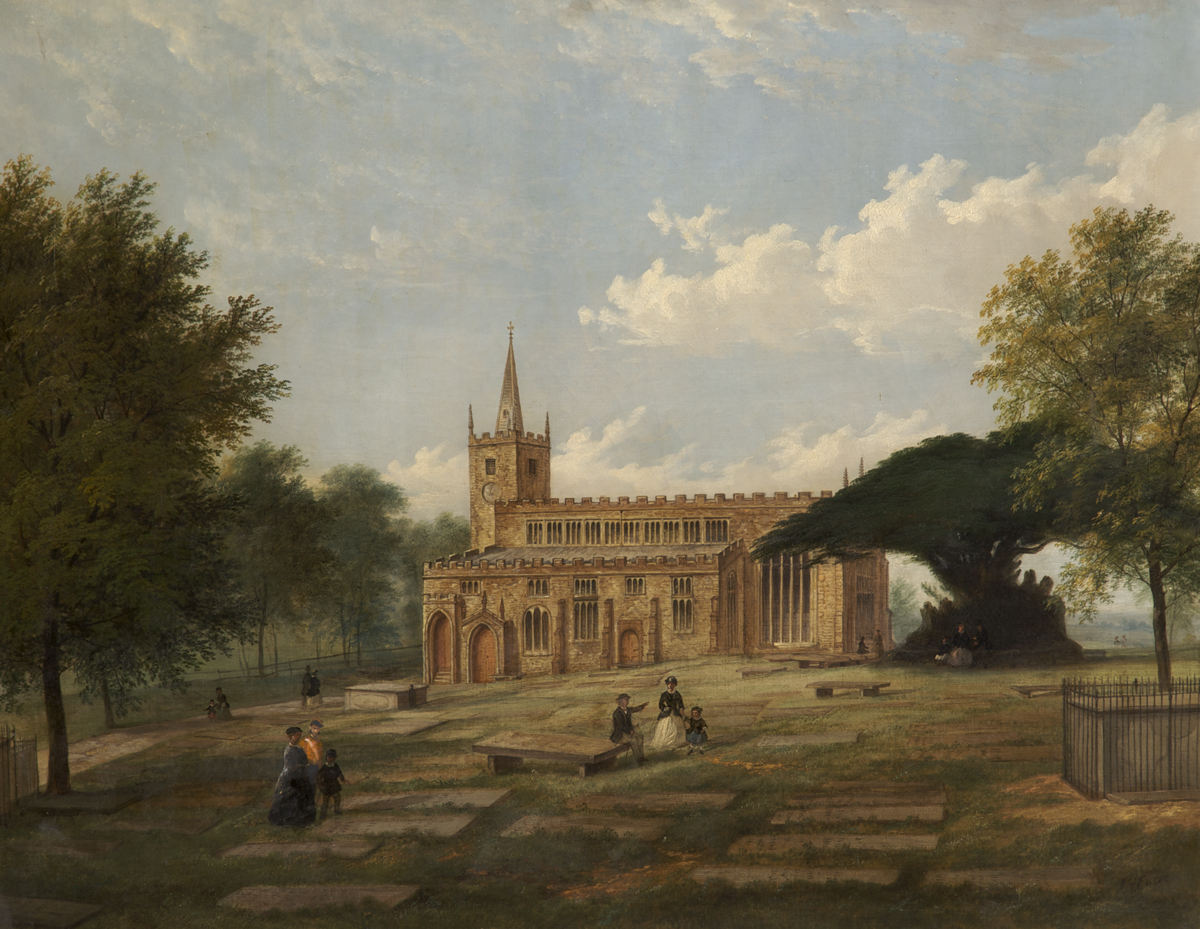
Deane Parish Church, c. 1860 by James Howe Carse

The Church of St Mary is situated in the old township of Rumworth, on high ground above the Church Brook—formerly the Saxon Kirkbroke—which flows through Deane Clough to the River Croal. St Mary, also known as St Mariden, was a chapel of ease of St Mary in Eccles before becoming the mother church of the ancient ecclesiastical parish of Deane. This parish was formed from the northern part of Eccles and takes its name from Deane Clough, the narrow wooded valley immediately west of the church. The building originated in the 14th century as a structure consisting of a nave and chancel with a steeply pitched roof and a western tower, which has since been considerably enlarged and altered.

== Structure ==
The oldest part of the church is the 14th-century west tower, which belonged to an earlier building on the site. The church is constructed of rough wall-stones and has embattled parapets to the chancel, nave, and aisles. At the east end stand three crocketed pinnacles. The windows feature rounded, uncusped heads to the lights, while the clerestory contains an almost continuous line of square-headed, three-light windows. The chancel has a seven-light pointed east window. Both the chancel and nave are covered by a continuous, flat-pitched oak-panelled roof dating from 1884, which follows the lines of the older structure.

In the early 15th century, the church was extended with the addition of a new chancel and was later widened by the construction of the north aisle. Some time afterwards, it was further enlarged by the addition of a third bay, and the south side was rebuilt with three arches. The 14th-century nave was demolished in the early 16th century, when a new nave arcade and clerestory were constructed. The chancel was lengthened by 10 feet (3 m) in 1884, and an organ chamber was added in 1887.

Measured internally, the chancel is 28 feet (8.5 m) long and 19 feet 6 inches (5.94 m) wide, while the nave measures 71 feet 6 inches (21.79 m) by 20 feet 9 inches (6.32 m). The north aisle is 13 feet (4 m) wide, with an organ chamber at the east end and a vestry at the west. The south aisle is 15 feet (4.6 m) wide and includes a south porch. The tower measures 9 feet (2.7 m) square.

== Churchyard ==
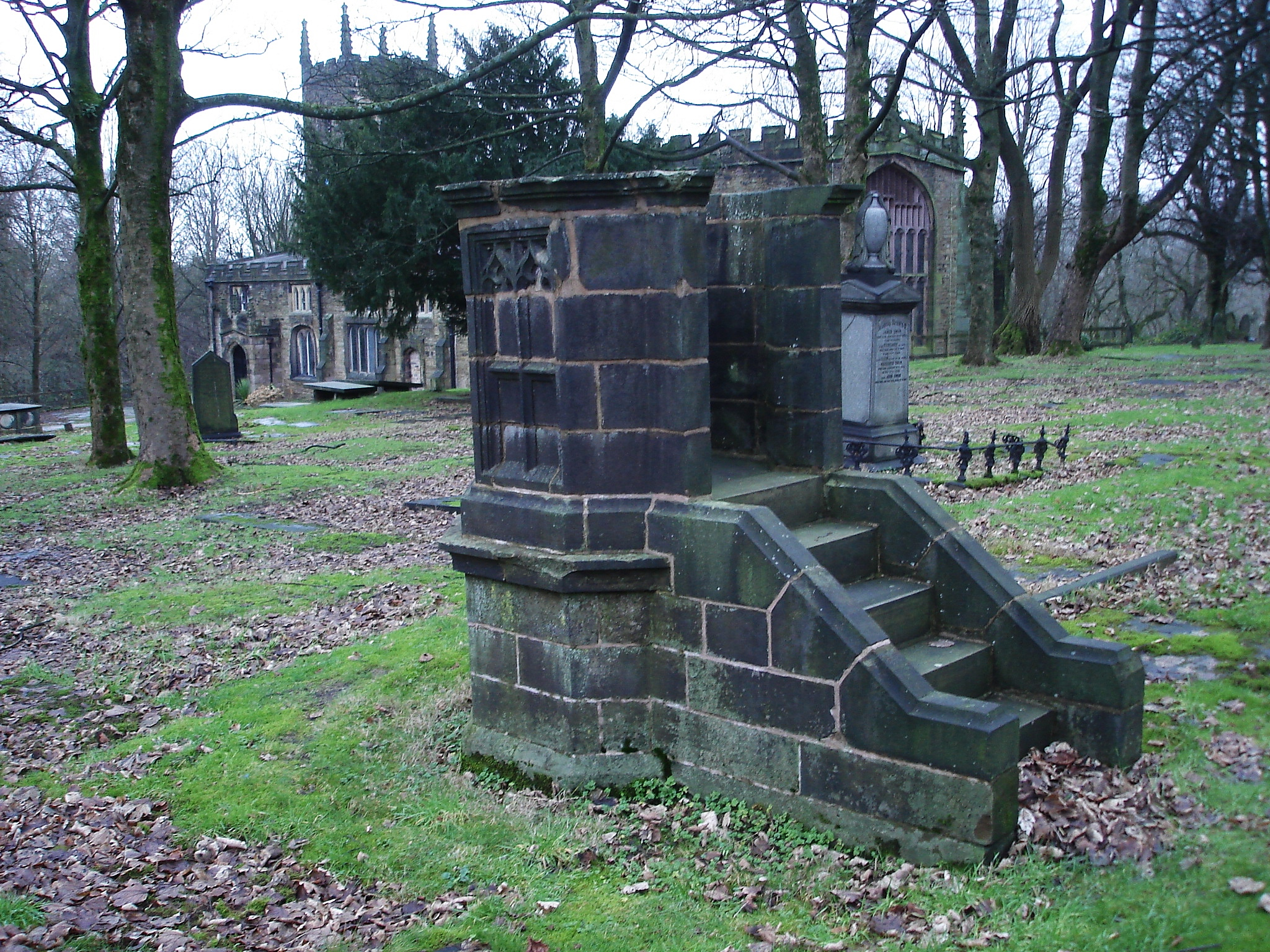
Pulpit in churchyard

Notable interments include Thomas and Joseph Rowland Heaton, founders of Lostock Junction Mills. Other graves include the war graves of 43 service personnel—15 from World War I and 28 from World War II. There are also 27 graves of victims of the 1910 Pretoria Pit Disaster.

The churchyard contains a memorial to the Protestant martyr George Marsh, which originally stood half a mile west of the church on New York Road. Inscriptions on its base record his martyrdom and the erection of the memorial in 1893. The churchyard also features an outdoor stone‑built pulpit.

== See also ==
- Grade II* listed buildings in Greater Manchester
- Hulton family
- List of churches in Greater Manchester
- Listed buildings in Bolton
