= George Marsh (martyr) =

English Protestant martyr (1515–1555)

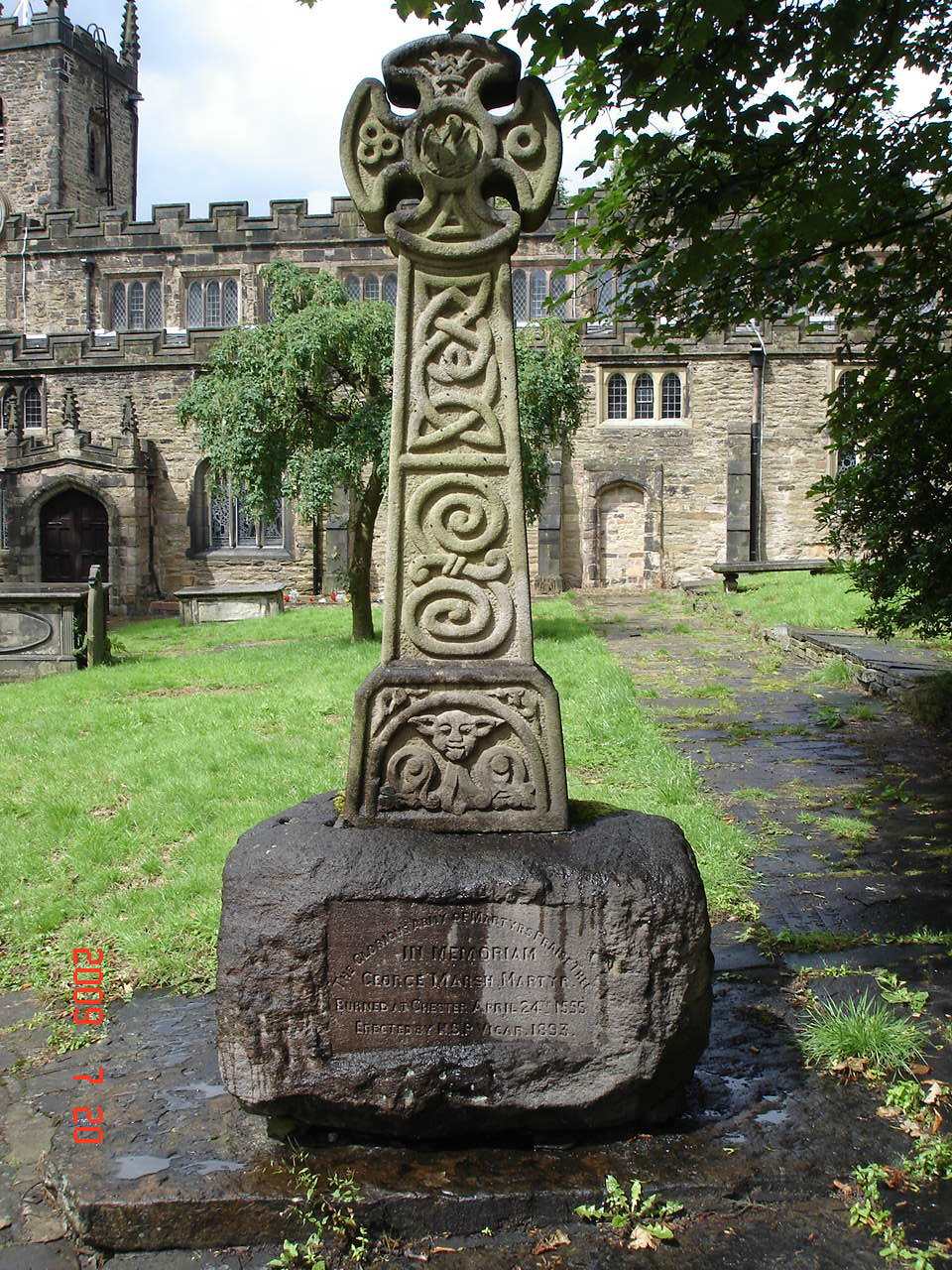
George Marsh memorial at St. Mary the Virgin's church in Deane

George Marsh (1515 – 24 April 1555) was an English Protestant martyr who died in Boughton, Chester, on 24 April 1555 as a result of the Marian Persecutions carried out against Protestant Reformers and other dissenters during the reign of Mary I of England. His death is recorded in Foxe's Book of Martyrs.

== Life ==
George Marsh was born and lived most of his life in the parish of Deane, near Bolton, Lancashire. He was a farmer and married at the age of twenty-five. After his wife's death he left his children in the care of his parents and entered Cambridge University, where he associated with advocates of the reformed faith and in particular Lawrence Saunders. Marsh, from Catholic Lancashire, probably became a Protestant while at Cambridge. Nicholas Ridley, the Bishop of London ordained him deacon in 1552 and the following year he became the curate at Church Langton in Leicestershire and the church of All Hallows Bread Street in London where Lawrence Saunders was the incumbent. He was said to be a tall man who had a clever way with words and a popular preacher. He was for a time employed by the king, but fell out of favour during the reign of Queen Mary I. After Saunders was arrested in 1554 George Marsh went north and continued preaching the Protestant faith in the parishes of Deane, Eccles and elsewhere in Lancashire.

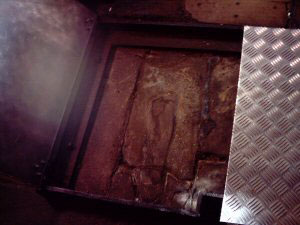
George Marsh's footprint of faith at Smithills Hall

A warrant was issued for Marsh's arrest for heresy by Edward Stanley, 3rd Earl of Derby. Justice Barton of Smithills Hall in Bolton sent servants to arrest him at his mother's house, but Marsh gave himself up at the hall. After being "examined" at Smithills, according to local tradition, Marsh stamped his foot so hard to re-affirm his faith that a footprint was left in the stone floor. While being questioned at Lathom House by the Earl of Derby it was thought that he could be made to conform and he was held in reasonable comfort. Marsh, however resisted the efforts to make him submit and when he refused to recant was taken to Lancaster Gaol where he was brought for trial at the Quarter Sessions. For nearly a year, Marsh remained in Lancaster Gaol where he read from the Bible and prayed with townsfolk gathered outside his window until George Cotes, the Catholic Bishop of Chester intervened. Sympathisers offered support and priests tried to convert him. When statutes against heresy were enacted by parliament Marsh was taken to the gaol at Northgate, Chester. He stood trial under Bishop Cotes in the Lady Chapel of Chester Cathedral. Marsh refused to convert to Roman Catholicism, despite being given one last chance to recant while being tied to the stake at which he was about to be burned. His imprisonment is documented in Foxe's Actes and Monuments. Marsh's follower and brother-in-law Geoffrey Hurst, a Shakerley nail maker, was also imprisoned at Lancaster but was saved from execution by Queen Mary's death.

== Death ==
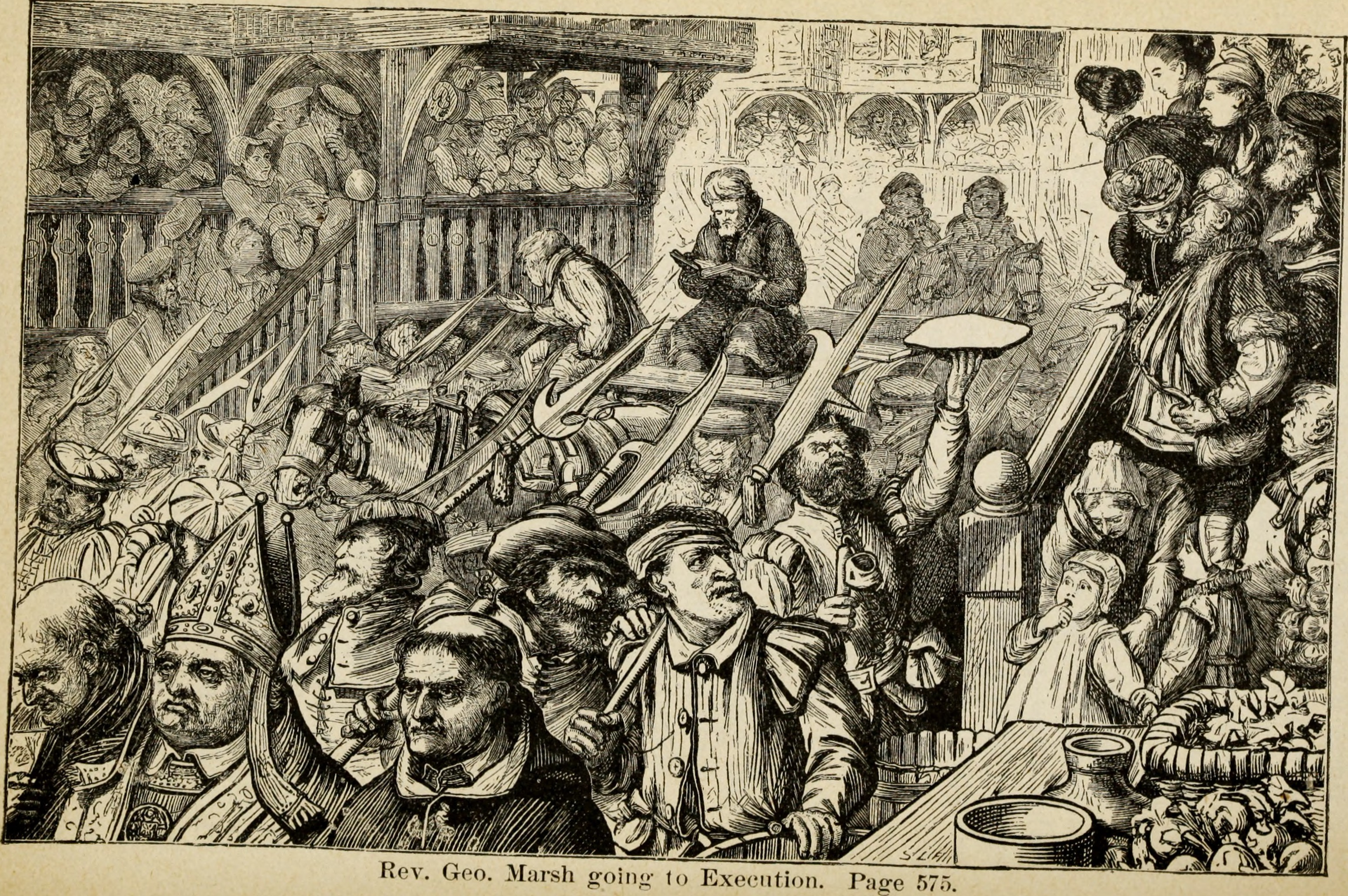
Illustration of Marsh's execution

George Marsh was executed in April 1555 on the north side of the road in Boughton, about a mile from Chester city centre. He was sentenced to be burned to death at the stake at the traditional execution ground. After his death his ashes were collected by his friends and buried in the nearby Saint Giles' Cemetery.

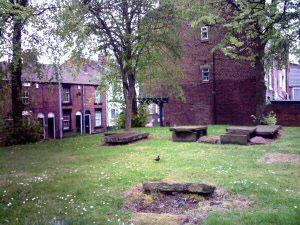
Saint Giles Cemetery

There is no grave marker in the cemetery, just a brief footnote on an inscription:

St Giles Cemetery. Here stood the leper hospital and chapel of St Giles. Founded early in the 12th century and endowed by successive Norman earls of Chester they remained in constant use until 1643. When defensive measures during the siege of Chester necessitated the demolition of buildings outside the city walls. The cemetery remained to mark the site and in time the little village of Spital Boughton clustered around it. In 1644 the royalist defenders suffered great loss of life in a gallant sortie in Boughton and many of the fallen were buried here. It was also used for victims of the plagues which ravaged the city in the 16th and 17th centuries. Being extra parochial the site was granted to the corporation by Charles II in 1685. As a burial ground and through for a period in the charge of St Johns parish. It remains in their hands. When Protestant martyr George Marsh was burned at the stake on gallows hill close by his ashes were collected by his friends and buried here. The last burial took place in 1854.

== Memorials ==
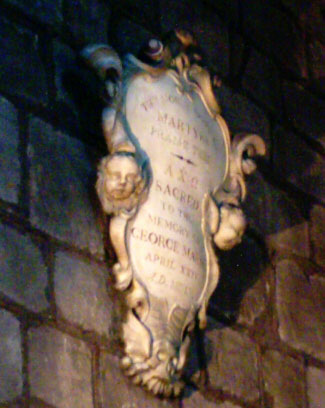
Memorial plaque, St John the Baptist's Church, Chester

There are two memorials to George Marsh at St Mary's Church in Deane. The base of a memorial cross in the churchyard is said to have been the base of an ancient Saxon cross from which early Christian preachers taught. It originally stood half a mile to the west of the church on New York Road. Inscriptions on its base record his martyrdom and the erection of the memorial in 1893. A window was dedicated to him in 1897 depicting Faith, Charity and Hope.

George Marsh has two memorials in Chester, one is in St John the Baptist's Church and the other is a granite obelisk erected in 1888 by the side of a road in Boughton, which has the following inscription:

George Marsh born Dean Co. Lancaster. To the memory of George Marsh martyr who was burned to death near this spot for the truth sake April 24th 1555.

== Legacy and influence ==
In the library at Smithills Hall are some of George Marsh's personal letters and journals and a 17th-century edition of John Foxe's Book of Martyrs which documents his trial. Protestants in Chester gather outside Chester Town Hall around 24 April to commemorate the life and death of Marsh.
