= Smithills School =

Location
- Smithills Dean Road; Smithills; Bolton, Greater Manchester, BL1 6JS; England; 53.5989°N 2.4543°W

Information
- Type: Academy
- Local authority: Bolton Council
- Department for Education URN: 140500 Tables
- Ofsted: Reports
- Headteacher: Carolyn Dewse
- Gender: Mixed
- Age: 11 to 16
- Enrolment: 1,032 as of November 2022
- Website: www.smithillsschool.net

Smithills School is a mixed secondary school located in Smithills, Bolton, Greater Manchester.

Previously a Grammar School and then a community school administered by Bolton Metropolitan Borough Council, Smithills School converted to academy status on 1 January 2014. However the school continues to coordinate with Bolton Metropolitan Borough Council for admissions.

Smithills School offers GCSEs and BTECs as programmes of study for pupils.

This school was used in the filming of the first series of 4 o'clock club, and was known as Elmsbury High in the TV show.

== Notable former pupils ==
- Sara Cox, broadcaster
- Paul Fletcher, footballer
- Stu Francis, comedian
- Ronnie Irani, cricketer
- Amir Khan, boxer
- John Longworth, Member of the European Parliament
- Paul Nicholls, actor
- Dave Spikey, comedian
- Lauren Patel, actor
