= Wayoh Reservoir =

Reservoir in Lancashire, England

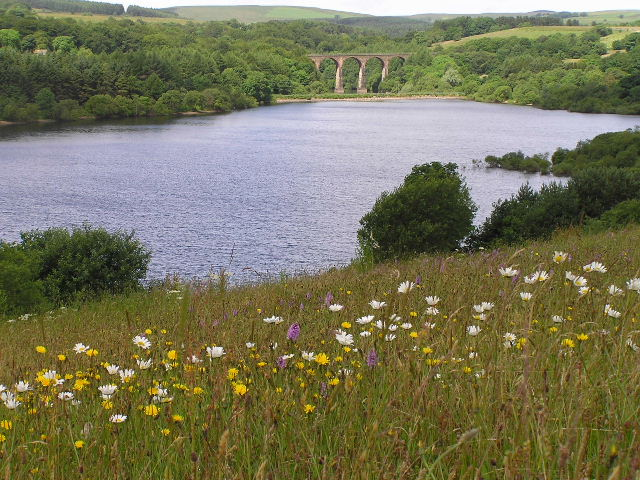
- The Wayoh Reservoir and Armsgrove Viaduct

- Shown within Blackburn with Darwen
- Location: Edgworth, Lancashire, England
- Coordinates: 53°38′49″N 2°24′23″W

Wayoh Reservoir is a water reservoir in the town of Edgworth, Lancashire, England. It was completed on 28 April 1876 to supply water to Bolton. Wayoh, together with the Turton and Entwistle Reservoir, make up 50% of Bolton's drinking water.

In 1962 in response to an increasing demand for drinking water in Bolton, a treatment plant was built and the reservoir enlarged to its present capacity of 501 million imperial gallons (2.28 Gl). Today the treatment plant can supply almost 10 million imperial gallons (45 Ml) of drinking water per day.

The reservoir is crossed by the earlier built Armsgrove Viaduct; which was built between 1847 and 1848 by the Blackburn, Darwen and Bolton Railway to bridge Bradshaw Brook.
