= Eagley Brook =

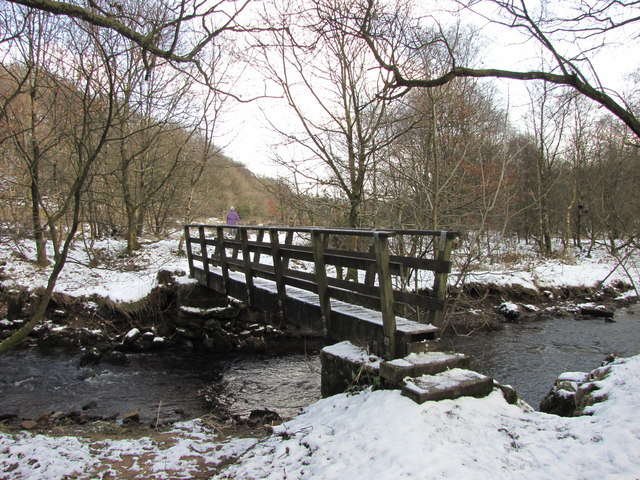
- Footbridge over Eagley Brook in Longworth Clough

Location
- Country: England

Physical characteristics
- Source
  - location: Lancashire
- Mouth
  - location: River Tonge
  - coordinates: 53°35′44.58″N 2°25′30.42″W

Eagley Brook (also known during the formative part of its course as Belmont Brook) is a small river of Lancashire and Greater Manchester in England.

Rising at the confluence of several smaller streams at Old Man's Hill in the West Pennine Moors, the brook almost immediately feeds Belmont Reservoir, after which it moves south and south east, passing the village of Belmont and collecting several tributaries and traversing the Longworth Clough, emerging close to Egerton.

From there, the river goes south, through Eagley near Bromley Cross, towards Astley Bridge, after which it joins Astley Brook at Meeting of the Waters to form the River Tonge.

Eagley Brook was historically important to the industrial and economic life of the north Bolton area. Its fast-flowing streams provided power to the water-wheels of the early industrial period, steam power at a later date, and soft water for bleaching and paper making.

== Tributaries ==
- Barley Brook (R)
- Gale Brook (R)
  - Three Nooked Shaw Brook (L)
- Delph Brook (L)
  - Slate Brook (R)
  - Stones Bank Brook
    - Rushton's Brook (Ls)
    - Holden's Brook (Rs)
- Hordern/Ward's Brook (R)
  - Grange Brook (R)
  - Great Gutte (R)
