= Astley Brook =

River in Greater Manchester, England

Location
- Country: England

Physical characteristics
- Source
  - coordinates: 53°35′55.29″N 2°26′53.47″W
- Mouth
  - location: River Tonge
  - coordinates: 53°35′44.58″N 2°25′30.42″W

Astley Brook is a river in Greater Manchester, England.

Rising at the confluence of Dean Brook and Raveden Brook near Halliwell in the Metropolitan Borough of Bolton, it travels eastward to "Meeting of the Waters", where it meets Eagley Brook to form the River Tonge.

== Tributaries ==
- Ravenden Brook (Ls)
  - Horrocks Brook ? (L)
- Dean Brook (Rs)
  - Hollin Brook (L)
  - Swine Cote Brook (L)
  - Dakin's Brook (R)
    - Roscoe's Brook ? (R)
    - New Field Brook (L)
    - Brown Lowe Brook ? (R)
