= Smithills =

Coordinates: 53.604657°N 2.462251°W

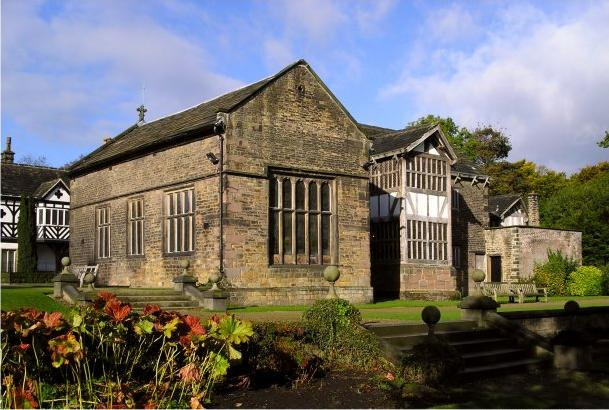
- Smithills Hall

- Location within Greater Manchester
- OS grid reference: SD695121
  - London: 221.6 mi (356.6 km) NW
- Metropolitan borough: Bolton
- Metropolitan county: Greater Manchester
- Region: North West
- Country: England
- Sovereign state: United Kingdom
- Post town: BOLTON
- Postcode district: BL1
- Dialling code: 01204
- Police: Greater Manchester
- Fire: Greater Manchester
- Ambulance: North West
- UK Parliament: Bolton West

Smithills is a mainly residential suburb of Bolton in Greater Manchester, England. It is 3.1 miles (5 km) northwest of Bolton, 14.5 miles (23 km) south of Blackburn and 11.9 miles (19 km) northwest of Manchester. Smithills lies on the lower south facing slopes of the West Pennine Moors.

== Toponymy ==
The name Smithills derives from the Old English smeþe meaning smooth and hyll, a hill and was recorded as Smythell in 1322.

== History ==
Lying within the boundaries of the historic county of Lancashire since the early 12th century, Smithills was anciently a manor in the township of Halliwell with Smithills Hall serving as the manor house. In 1877, the south-eastern area of Halliwell became the ninth electoral ward of the County Borough of Bolton. The remaining north-western area became known as Halliwell Higher End until 1894 when it changed its name to Smithills and became one of the civil parishes of the Bolton Rural District, being formed from the rural part of Halliwell parish, on 30 September 1898 the parish was abolished and merged with Bolton and it too became part of the County Borough of Bolton.

== Governance ==
Since 1974, Smithills has been part of the Metropolitan Borough of Bolton and gives its name to one of Bolton Council's electoral wards, the Smithills ward which includes Barrow Bridge, Delph Hill, Doffcocker, Johnson Fold, Moss Bank Park, and Smithills Moor. It is represented in Bolton Town Hall by three councillors. At the United Kingdom Census 2011, the ward had a population of 14,011. The ward is also part of the Bolton West constituency and has been represented in the House of Commons by the Conservative Party MP Chris Green since 2015.

== Education ==
Smithills has two schools: St Peter's Smithills Dean Church of England Primary School for pupils aged 4–11 and Smithills School, a mixed secondary school for pupils aged 11–16.
