= Turton and Entwistle Reservoir =

Reservoir in Lancashire, England

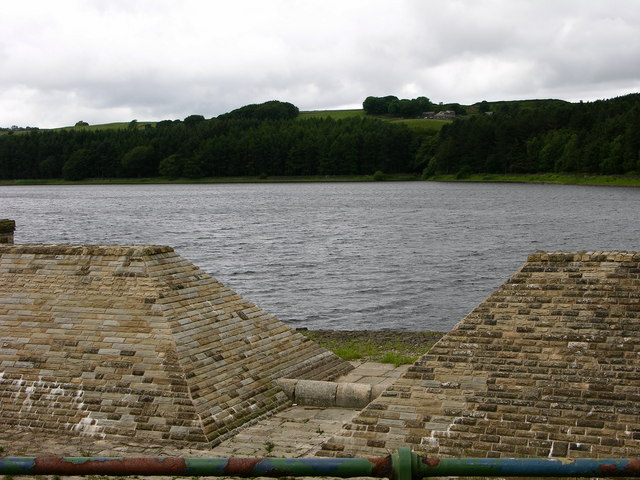
- View West of Turton and Entwistle Reservoir

- Shown within Blackburn with Darwen
- Location: Lancashire, England
- Coordinates: 53°39′14″N 2°25′30″W

Turton and Entwistle Reservoir is a water reservoir in the village of Edgworth, Lancashire, England. The reservoir's existence is due to the Entwistle Dam. When constructed in 1832 the Entwistle Dam was the highest in Britain; it rises 108 feet from the base. The reservoir contains almost 750 thousand imperial gallons (roughly 3,400,000 litres) and, with the Wayoh Reservoir just below, satisfies around 50% of Bolton's need for drinking water.

Turton and Entwistle Reservoir Act 1832
- Act of Parliament
- Parliament of the United Kingdom
- Long title: An Act for making and maintaining a Reservoir upon Bradshaw Brook in the Townships of Turton and Entwisle in the Parish of Bolton-le-Moors in the County of Lancaster, for providing a more regular Supply of Water in Bradshaw Brook aforesaid, and in certain Rivers connected therewith.
- Citation: 2 & 3 Will. 4. c. xxiv

Dates
- Royal assent: 3 April 1832

Text of statute as originally enacted

Entwistle Dam was designed by Thomas Ashworth, a local land surveyor, overseen by Jesse Hartley, the Liverpool Docks engineer. Other works were by Joseph Jackson, an engineer and surveyor from Bolton. It was built for the Commissioners of the Turton and Entwistle Reservoir, a group of local mill owners who obtained an enabling act of Parliament, the Turton and Entwistle Reservoir Act 1832 (2 & 3 Will. 4. c. xxiv) to regulate the supply of water in Bradshaw Brook for water power for the finishing textiles.

Records suggest it was built entirely of puddle clay with no distinct core. Earth dams usually have a waterproof cutoff under their earthworks designed to stop seepage under the dam but it is doubtful whether there was any such a cutoff at Entwistle. The reservoir has a rock-cut outlet tunnel driven through the valley side rather than a culvert or pipeline and a siphon draw-off pipe. The dam is 108 ft high and 110 metres long at the crest. The present overflow channel and valve tower were added by the Bolton Corporation Waterworks who took over the reservoir in 1864.
