= Deane, Greater Manchester =

Area of Bolton, Greater Manchester, England

Coordinates: 53.571°N 2.468°W

Deane
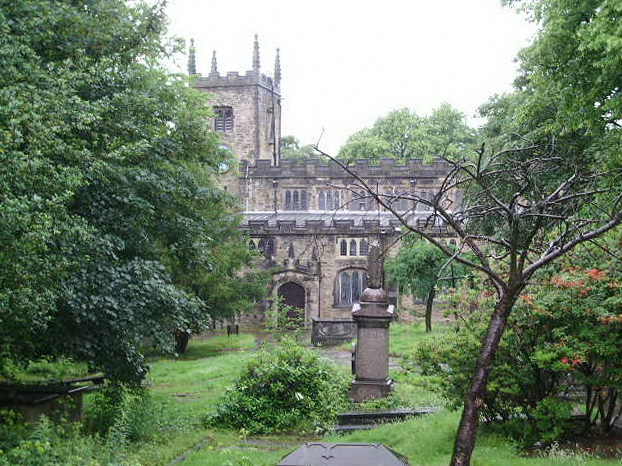
- Deane Parish Church

- Location within Greater Manchester
- OS grid reference: SD689084
  - London: 173 mi (278 km) SE
- Metropolitan borough: Bolton
- Metropolitan county: Greater Manchester
- Region: North West
- Country: England
- Sovereign state: United Kingdom
- Post town: BOLTON
- Postcode district: BL3
- Dialling code: 01204
- Police: Greater Manchester
- Fire: Greater Manchester
- Ambulance: North West
- UK Parliament: Bolton West

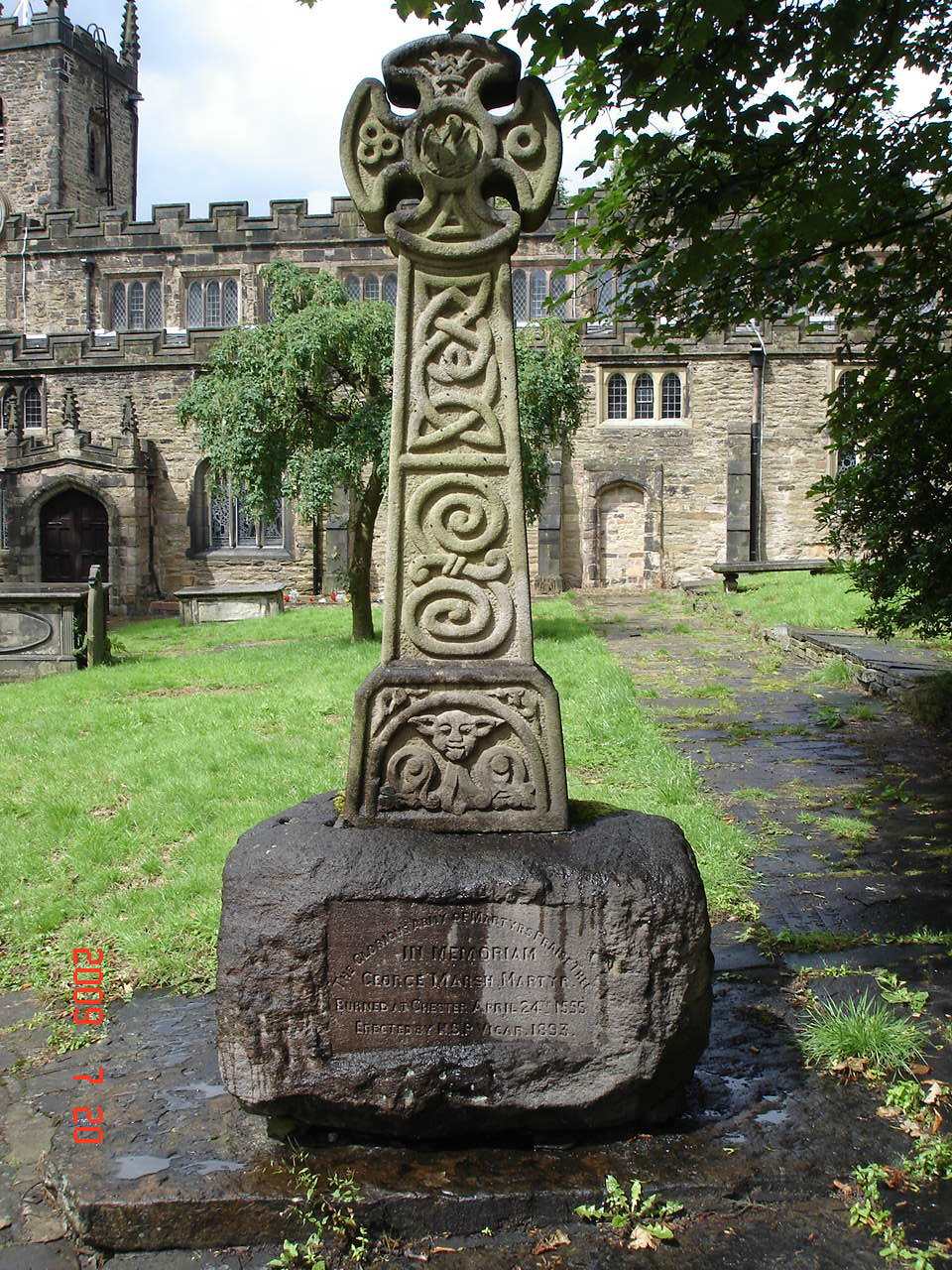
George Marsh memorial

Deane is an area of Bolton, in Greater Manchester, England. It is about 2 miles (3.2 km) south west of Bolton and 11 miles (17.7 km) northwest of Manchester.

Historically a part of Lancashire, the parish of Deane was one of eleven parishes within the hundred of Salford and covered roughly half of the present Metropolitan Borough of Bolton. The Church of St Mary on which the parish was centred was in the township of Rumworth.

== History ==
=== Toponymy ===
The name Deane derives from the Old English word "denu" - meaning valley. In earlier times Deane was written without the final "e". The stream running in the valley to the west of the church was named the Kirkbroke - meaning Church Brook. The valley is also referred to as Deane Clough, "clough" being a Northern English word for a ravine or deep valley.

=== Early church history ===
Since Anglo-Saxon times there has been a chapel at Deane in the township of Rumworth, the earliest record is from the year 1100. This chapel of ease dedicated to St Mary the Virgin was sometimes referred to as St Mariden i.e. St Mary's, Deane in old documents. Deane chapelry in the ancient parish of Eccles was mentioned in 13th-century deeds and became a parish in its own right in 1541. St Mary's Church, on the site of the original chapel, dates from 1452 replacing an earlier structure, the tower and north door are older than the rest of the building. The church has been altered at various times and was restored in about 1880.

=== George Marsh ===
The Protestant martyr, George Marsh, a farmer's son, was born in Deane in 1515. When Edward VI became King in 1547, Marsh's study of the New Testament led to his appointment as a preaching minister. When Edward VI died in 1553, his half-sister Mary I became Queen. She sought to re-establish Roman Catholicism, Marsh became victim to her persecution of the reformers. He appeared before Justice Barton at Smithills Hall accused of preaching false doctrines. Imprisoned at Chester, he refused to deny his beliefs, was tried, convicted, and burnt at the stake on 24 April 1555. A memorial was erected in the churchyard in 1893, it is a Grade II listed structure.

== Governance ==
Lying within the boundaries of the historic county of Lancashire since the early 12th century, Deane was originally the northern half of the ancient parish of Eccles, but in 1541 it became a civil and ecclesiastical parish in its own right. As with many large parishes in the north of England, Deane was divided into the ten townships of Horwich, Halliwell, Heaton, Rumworth (where Deane Parish Church is situated), Westhoughton, Over Hulton, Middle Hulton, Little Hulton, Farnworth and Kearsley. Under provisions of the Poor Relief Act 1662, the ten townships became separate autonomous local authorities, replacing the civil parish of Deane as the main unit of local administration, although the ecclesiastical parish still remained under the authority of the vicar of Deane.

In 1837, Rumworth along with neighbouring townships (or civil parishes) became part of the Bolton Poor Law Union which took responsibility for the administration and funding of the Poor Law in that area. In the 19th century many of the Deane townships became independent civil parishes and were merged into the Municipal Borough of Bolton or formed they own urban districts. Deane was a civil parish until 1866, in 1872, part of Rumworth township became part of Bolton Municipal Borough, on 31 December 1894 Deane became a parish again, being formed from the rural part of Rumworth and became part of Bolton Rural District, on 30 September 1898 the parish was abolished and merged with Bolton and became part of the County Borough of Bolton. In 1891 the parish had a population of 22,994.
