= 2022 Bolton Metropolitan Borough Council election =

2022 local election in Bolton

- 5 May 2022

20 out of 60 seats to Bolton Metropolitan Borough Council 31 seats needed for a majority
	First party	Second party	Third party
Leader	Martyn Cox	Nick Peel	Roger Hayes
Party	Conservative	Labour	Liberal Democrats
Last election	20 seats, 38.8%	19 seats, 35.3%	5 seats, 9.7%
Seats won	9	8	2
Seats after	23	18	5
Seat change	▲3	▼1	Steady
Popular vote	23,377	26,041	6,696
Percentage	34.1%	38.0%	9.8%
	Fourth party	Fifth party
Leader	Paul Sanders	David Grant
Party	Farnworth and Kearsley First	Horwich and Blackrod First
Last election	5 seats, 5.4%	3 seats, 3.0%
Seats won	0	0
Seats after	3	2
Seat change	▼2	▼1
Popular vote	2,394	2,442
Percentage	3.5%	3.6%
- Winner of each seat at the 2022 Bolton Metropolitan Borough Council election
Council control before election
No overall control
Subsequent council control
No overall control

The 2022 Bolton Metropolitan Borough Council election took place on 5 May 2022. One third of councillors—20 out of 60—were elected. The election took place alongside other local elections across the United Kingdom.

In the previous council election in 2021, the council remained under no overall control. The Conservatives continued running a minority administration with a confidence and supply arrangement with smaller parties, as they had done prior to the election. Labour formed the main opposition with nineteen seats to the Conservatives' twenty.

== Background ==
Result of the council election when these seats were last contested in 2018

Result of the most recent council election in 2021

The Local Government Act 1972 created a two-tier system of metropolitan counties and districts covering Greater Manchester, Merseyside, South Yorkshire, Tyne and Wear, the West Midlands, and West Yorkshire starting in 1974. Bolton was a district of the Greater Manchester metropolitan county. The Local Government Act 1985 abolished the metropolitan counties, with metropolitan districts taking on most of their powers as metropolitan boroughs. The Greater Manchester Combined Authority was created in 2011 and began electing the mayor of Greater Manchester from 2017, which was given strategic powers covering a region coterminous with the former Greater Manchester metropolitan county.

Since its formation, Bolton Council has variously been under Labour control, Conservative control and no overall control. Labour most recently regained its majority in the 2011 council election, which it held until the 2019 election. After the 2019 election, Labour held 23 seats, the Conservatives 20, the Liberal Democrats six, the local party Farnworth and Kearsley First five, the UK Independence Party three and the local party Horwich and Blackrod First two, alongside one independent councillor. The Conservatives formed a confidence and supply agreement with the Liberal Democrats, Farnworth and Kearsley First, Horwich and Blackrod First and the UK Independence Party, allowing them to form a minority administration. In the 2021 election, the Conservatives became the largest party with 20 seats, followed by Labour with 19. There were also seven independent councillors, five Liberal Democrats, five Farnworth and Kearsley First councillors, three Horwich and Blackrod First councillors and one UK Independence Party councillor. The Conservatives continued to run a minority administration with support from smaller parties. The Liberal Democrats had ended their working arrangement with the Conservatives in January 2021. Marie Brady, the leader of the Horwich and Blackrod First party, defected to the Conservative Party in March 2022 after the party's two other councillors voted against the Conservative budget.

The seats up for election in 2022 were last regularly contested in the 2018 election. Following that election, Labour held 31 seats, the Conservatives 19, Farnworth and Kearsley First, the Liberal Democrats and UKIP three each, and another councillor held the remaining seat. In 2022, Reform UK and the local party Bolton For Change fielded joint candidates under the description "Reform UK & Bolton for Change". The seats up for election in 2022 were last regularly contested in the 2018 election. In that election, the Conservatives won nine seats, Labour won eight, and the Liberal Democrats and Farnworth and Kearsley First won two each. Before the 2022 election, Reform UK and the newly formed local party Bolton For Change announced that they would work together, saying that cross-party working could give them a voice at both local and national level. They fielded joint candidates under the description "Reform UK & Bolton for Change". The arrangement continued in the 2023 and 2024 elections, when candidates again stood under the joint description.

== Electoral process ==
The council elects its councillors in thirds, with a third up for election every year for three years and no election in the fourth year. The election used first-past-the-post voting. Each ward was represented by three councillors, with one normally elected in each election year to serve a four-year term.

All registered electors (British, Irish, Commonwealth and European Union citizens) living in Bolton aged 18 or over were entitled to vote. People who lived at two addresses in different council areas, such as university students with different term-time and holiday addresses, could be registered for and vote in elections in both local authorities. Polling stations were open from 07:00 to 22:00 on election day, and voters could apply for postal or proxy votes in advance.

== Campaign ==
The Conservative councillor Adele Warren said that increases in the cost of living would affect the election, with people "frightened about turning their electricity or heating on". She said that the Conservative Chancellor of the Exchequer Rishi Sunak "could have gone much, much further" with measures to help people.

== Previous council composition ==
After 2021 election		Before 2022 election	
Party	Seats	Party	Seats
Conservative	20	Conservative	22
Labour	19	Labour	18
Independent	7	Independent	7
Liberal Democrats	5	Liberal Democrats	5
Farnworth and Kearsley First	5	Farnworth and Kearsley First	5
Horwich and Blackrod First	3	Horwich and Blackrod First	2
UKIP	1	Little Lever & Darcy Lever First	1

Changes:

- June 2021: Diane Parkinson re-joins Conservatives
- July 2021: David Greenhalgh (Conservative) dies; by-election held October 2021
- October 2021: Amy Cowen wins by-election for Conservatives
- February 2022: Shamim Abdullah leaves Labour to sit as an independent
- March 2022: Marie Brady leaves Horwich and Blackrod First for Conservatives
- March 2022: Sean Hornby leaves UKIP to form a new party, Little Lever and Darcy Lever First

== Results summary ==
2022 Bolton Metropolitan Borough Council election
Party	This election			Full council			This election		
Party	Seats	Net	Seats %	Other	Total	Total %	Votes	Votes %	+/−
Conservative	9	▲1	45.0	14	23	38.3	23,377	34.1	-4.7
Labour	8	Steady	40.0	10	18	30.0	26,041	38.0	+2.7
Independent	0	Steady	0.0	7	7	11.7	92	0.1	-2.9
Liberal Democrats	2	Steady	10.0	3	5	8.3	6,696	9.8	+0.1
Farnworth and Kearsley First	0	▼2	0.0	3	3	5.0	2,394	3.5	-1.9
Horwich and Blackrod First	0	Steady	0.0	2	2	3.3	2,442	3.6	+0.6
One Kearsley	1	▲1	5.0	0	1	1.7	1,099	1.6	N/A
Reform UK & Bolton For Change	0	Steady	0.0	0	0	0.0	3,922	5.7	N/A
Green	0	Steady	0.0	0	0	0.0	1,440	2.1	-2.0
Little Lever & Darcy Lever First	0	Steady	0.0	1	1	1.7	634	0.9	N/A
Westhoughton First	0	Steady	0.0	0	0	0.0	361	0.5	N/A

== Ward results ==
The statement of persons nominated was dated 5 April. The results were published by Bolton Council. Incumbent councillors are marked with an asterisk (*).

=== Astley Bridge ===
Astley Bridge (1 seat)
Party	Candidate	Votes	%	±%
Conservative	John Walsh*	1,743	49.4	▼12.1
Labour Co-op	Steve Sutton	1,193	33.8	▲9.3
Green	Mark Devereux	254	7.2	N/A
Liberal Democrats	James Haslam	232	6.6	▼2.6
Reform UK & Bolton For Change	Aimee Monson	108	3.1	N/A
Majority		550	15.6	▼21.4
Turnout		3,545	34	▼6.0
Conservative hold		Swing		

=== Bradshaw ===
Bradshaw (1 seat)
Party	Candidate	Votes	%	±%
Conservative	Mudasir Dean*	1,723	52.5	▼15.9
Labour	James Tibbits	1,069	32.6	▲9.9
Liberal Democrats	Caroline Turner-Preece	301	9.2	▲6.6
Reform UK & Bolton For Change	Daniel Swarsbrick	191	5.8	‘’New’’
Majority		654	19.9	▼26.1
Turnout		3,289	32	▼9.3
Conservative hold		Swing		

=== Breightmet ===
Breightmet (1 seat)
Party	Candidate	Votes	%	±%
Conservative	Adele Warren*	1,504	49.1	Steady
Labour Co-op	George Butler	1,207	39.4	▲1.3
Reform UK & Bolton For Change	Martin McLoughlin	228	7.4	N/A
Liberal Democrats	Becky Forrest	127	4.1	▲2.2
Majority		297	9.7	▼1.3
Turnout		3,078	32	▼1.2
Conservative hold		Swing		

=== Bromley Cross ===
- Changes relative to 2021 by-election, won by Amy Cowan after the death of David Greenhalgh

Bromley Cross (1 seat)
Party	Candidate	Votes	%	±%
Conservative	Amy Cowen*	2,295	56.4	−13.6
Labour	Gaynor Cox	1,227	30.2	+13.7
Green	Lee Harrison	187	4.6	−2.1
Reform UK & Bolton For Change	Amy Hare	183	4.5	New
Liberal Democrats	Warren Fox	174	4.3	+1.6
Majority		1,068	26.2	−27.3
Turnout		4,074	39	▼3.8
Conservative hold		Swing		

=== Crompton ===
Crompton (1 seat)
Party	Candidate	Votes	%	±%
Labour	Emily Mort	1,815	45.7	▼8.9
Conservative	Yusuf Davda	1,783	44.9	▲13.1
Reform UK & Bolton For Change	Gareth Fitzsimmons	198	5.0	N/A
Liberal Democrats	Francine Godfrey	174	4.4	▲0.6
Majority		32	0.8	▼22.0
Turnout		3,986	27	▼9.4
Labour hold		Swing		

=== Farnworth ===
Farnworth (1 seat)
Party	Candidate	Votes	%	±%
Labour	Nadeem Ayub	1,406	47.9	▲7.7
Farnworth and Kearsley First	Maureen Flitcroft*	1,118	38.1	▼11.5
Conservative	Mark Derbyshire	216	7.4	▼1.0
Reform UK & Bolton For Change	Sharon Whitworth	143	4.9	N/A
Liberal Democrats	Christine MacPherson	52	1.8	Steady
Majority		288	9.8	N/A
Turnout		2,943	27	▼3.4
Labour gain from Farnworth and Kearsley First		Swing		

=== Great Lever ===
Great Lever (1 seat)
Party	Candidate	Votes	%	±%
Labour	Mohammed Ayub*	1,963	68.3	▲10.3
Conservative	Zahra Davda	514	17.9	▼14.4
Reform UK & Bolton For Change	Alex McAllister	149	5.2	N/A
Green	Heather Rylance	140	4.9	▼1.1
Liberal Democrats	Duncan MacPherson	107	3.7	▲0.1
Majority		1,449	50.4	▲24.8
Turnout		2,887	27	▼11.5
Labour hold		Swing		

=== Halliwell ===
Halliwell (1 seat)
Party	Candidate	Votes	%	±%
Labour	Akhtar Zaman*	2,071	74.5	▲1.1
Conservative	Leslie Webb	335	12.1	▼6.3
Reform UK & Bolton For Change	Norman Cryer	156	5.6	N/A
Liberal Democrats	Liz Turner-Allen	126	4.5	▲2.6
Independent	Anthony Massey	92	3.3	▲0.5
Majority		1,736	62.4	▲7.4
Turnout		2,795	22	▼9.2
Labour hold		Swing		

=== Harper Green ===
Harper Green (1 seat)
Party	Candidate	Votes	%	±%
Labour	Hamid Khurram*	1,831	57.0	▲12.1
Conservative	Fred Khan	567	17.7	▼8.7
Farnworth and Kearsley First	Leanne Oliver	561	17.5	▼4.8
Reform UK & Bolton For Change	Phillip Worthington	180	5.6	N/A
Liberal Democrats	Jaleh Hayes	73	2.3	▲1.2
Majority		1,264	39.3	▲20.9
Turnout		3,225	31	▼3.2
Labour hold		Swing		

=== Heaton & Lostock ===
Heaton & Lostock (1 seat)
Party	Candidate	Votes	%	±%
Conservative	Anne Galloway*	2,239	52.3	▼4.7
Labour	Janahan Kugathas	1,172	27.4	▼1.5
Reform UK & Bolton For Change	Gordon Campbell	596	13.9	N/A
Liberal Democrats	Jim Priest	270	6.3	▼3.6
Majority		1,067	24.9	▼3.2
Turnout		4,290	40	▼5.9
Conservative hold		Swing		

=== Horwich & Blackrod ===
Horwich & Blackrod (1 seat)
Party	Candidate	Votes	%	±%
Conservative	Susan Baines*	1,200	32.0	▼0.6
Horwich and Blackrod First	Samantha Williamson	1,143	30.5	▼2.5
Labour	Karen Millington	1,129	30.1	▲1.5
Green	Jackie Anderson	155	4.1	▲0.3
Liberal Democrats	Kevin Walsh	73	1.9	▼0.1
Reform UK & Bolton For Change	Loren Richards	46	1.2	N/A
Majority		57	1.5	‘’N/A’’
Turnout		3,755	34	▼2.2
Conservative hold		Swing		

=== Horwich North East ===
Horwich North East (1 seat)
Party	Candidate	Votes	%	±%
Labour	Kevin McKeon*	1,428	38.0	▲2.8
Horwich and Blackrod First	Ryan Bamforth	1,299	34.6	▲7.8
Conservative	Charles O’Kelly	641	17.1	▲1.7
Liberal Democrats	Matt Turner-Allen	212	5.6	▼14.2
Green	David Ebbitt	133	3.5	▲0.6
Reform UK & Bolton For Change	Darren Lear	40	1.1	N/A
Majority		129	3.4	▼5.0
Turnout		3,760	38	▼2.3
Labour hold		Swing		

=== Hulton ===
Hulton (1 seat)
Party	Candidate	Votes	%	±%
Conservative	Shafi Patel	1,420	44.4	▼0.5
Labour	Shafaqat Shaikh	1,189	37.2	▲8.8
Green	Wendy Shepherd	241	7.5	▼15.3
Liberal Democrats	Neil Maher	179	5.6	▲3.8
Reform UK & Bolton For Change	Robert Lowe	171	5.3	N/A
Majority		231	7.2	▼9.2
Turnout		3,215	32	▼5.2
Conservative hold		Swing		

=== Kearsley ===
Kearsley (1 seat)
Party	Candidate	Votes	%	±%
One Kearsley	Debbie Newall	1,099	37.9	N/A
Farnworth and Kearsley First	Peter Flitcroft	715	24.6	▼27.7
Labour	Jonathan Owen	593	20.4	▲4.9
Conservative	Mark Cunningham	241	8.3	▼9.3
Reform UK & Bolton For Change	Julie Pattison*	221	7.6	N/A
Liberal Democrats	Michael Wilkinson	34	1.2	▼13.3
Majority		384	13.3	N/A
Turnout		2,909	28	▼4.4
One Kearsley gain from Farnworth and Kearsley First				

=== Little Lever & Darcy Lever ===
Little Lever & Darcy Lever (1 seat)
Party	Candidate	Votes	%	±%
Conservative	David Meehan	1,243	37.9	▼4.7
Labour	Logan Pratheepan	809	24.7	▼5.7
Little Lever & Darcy Lever First	Rees Gibbon	634	19.3	N/A
Reform UK & Bolton For Change	Kath Harris	485	14.8	N/A
Liberal Democrats	Scott Turner-Preece	106	3.2	▲1.4
Majority		434	13.2	+1.0
Turnout		3,280	33	▲4.0
Conservative gain from Labour		Swing		

=== Rumworth ===
Rumworth (1 seat)
Party	Candidate	Votes	%	±%
Labour	Abdul Atcha	2,017	55.2	▼8.3
Conservative	Ayyub Patel	1,297	35.5	▲6.6
Green	Alan Johnson	226	6.2	▲1.2
Reform UK & Bolton For Change	Christopher Riley	62	1.7	N/A
Liberal Democrats	David Cooper	55	1.5	▼0.8
Majority		720	19.7	▼14.9
Turnout		3,666	36	▼1.5
Labour hold		Swing		

=== Smithills ===
Smithills (1 seat)
Party	Candidate	Votes	%	±%
Liberal Democrats	Sue Priest	1,931	50.7	▲6.5
Labour Co-op	Sorie Sesay	980	25.7	▲0.5
Conservative	Joan Johnson	612	16.1	▼6.8
Reform UK & Bolton For Change	Helen Shaw	183	4.8	N/A
Green	Rod Riesco	104	2.7	▼0.7
Majority		951	25.0	▲5.7
Turnout		3,814	36	▼1.4
Liberal Democrats hold		Swing		

=== Tonge with the Haulgh ===
Tonge with the Haulgh (1 seat)
Party	Candidate	Votes	%	±%
Labour	Nick Peel*	1,288	44.8	▼0.1
Conservative	Wesley McArdle	1,102	38.3	▼1.3
Reform UK & Bolton For Change	Trevor Jones	401	13.9	N/A
Liberal Democrats	Rosalind Harasiwka	86	3.0	▲0.1
Majority		186	6.5	▲1.1
Turnout		2,889	30	▼0.9
Labour hold		Swing		

=== Westhoughton North & Chew Moor ===
Westhoughton North & Chew Moor (1 seat)
Party	Candidate	Votes	%	±%
Conservative	Martyn Cox*	1,648	42.7	▼3.9
Liberal Democrats	Arthur Price	1,266	32.8	▲3.8
Labour	Zulfi Jiva	645	16.7	▲1.0
Westhoughton First	Jack Speight	220	5.7	▲0.9
Reform UK & Bolton For Change	Jeff Armstrong	84	2.2	N/A
Majority		382	9.9	▼0.6
Turnout		3,875	35	▼2.8
Conservative hold		Swing		

=== Westhoughton South ===
Westhoughton South (1 seat)
Party	Candidate	Votes	%	±%
Liberal Democrats	David Wilkinson*	1,118	32.7	▲5.4
Conservative	Martin Tighe	1,054	30.8	▼5.2
Labour	David Chadwick	1,009	29.5	▲4.6
Westhoughton First	Richard Brennan	141	4.1	▼1.4
Reform UK & Bolton For Change	Richard Bates	97	2.8	N/A
Majority		64	1.9	▼26.5
Turnout		3,427	34	▼1.2
Liberal Democrats hold		Swing		

== By-elections ==
=== Rumworth ===
Rumworth: 15 September 2022
Party	Candidate	Votes	%	±%
Conservative	Ayyub Ismail Patel	1,610	55.0	▲19.5
Labour	Ismail Patel	1,102	37.6	▼17.6
Green	Alan Johnson	156	5.3	▼0.9
Liberal Democrats	David Charles Tyas Cooper	36	1.2	▼0.3
Reform UK & Bolton For Change	Rosanna Maria Makar	23	0.8	▼0.9
Majority		508	17.4	
Rejected ballots		10		
Turnout		2,937		
Conservative gain from Labour		Swing	18.55	

The Rumworth by-election was triggered by the resignation of Labour councillor Ebrahim Adia due to career commitments.
