= 2026 Bolton Council election =

2026 English local government election

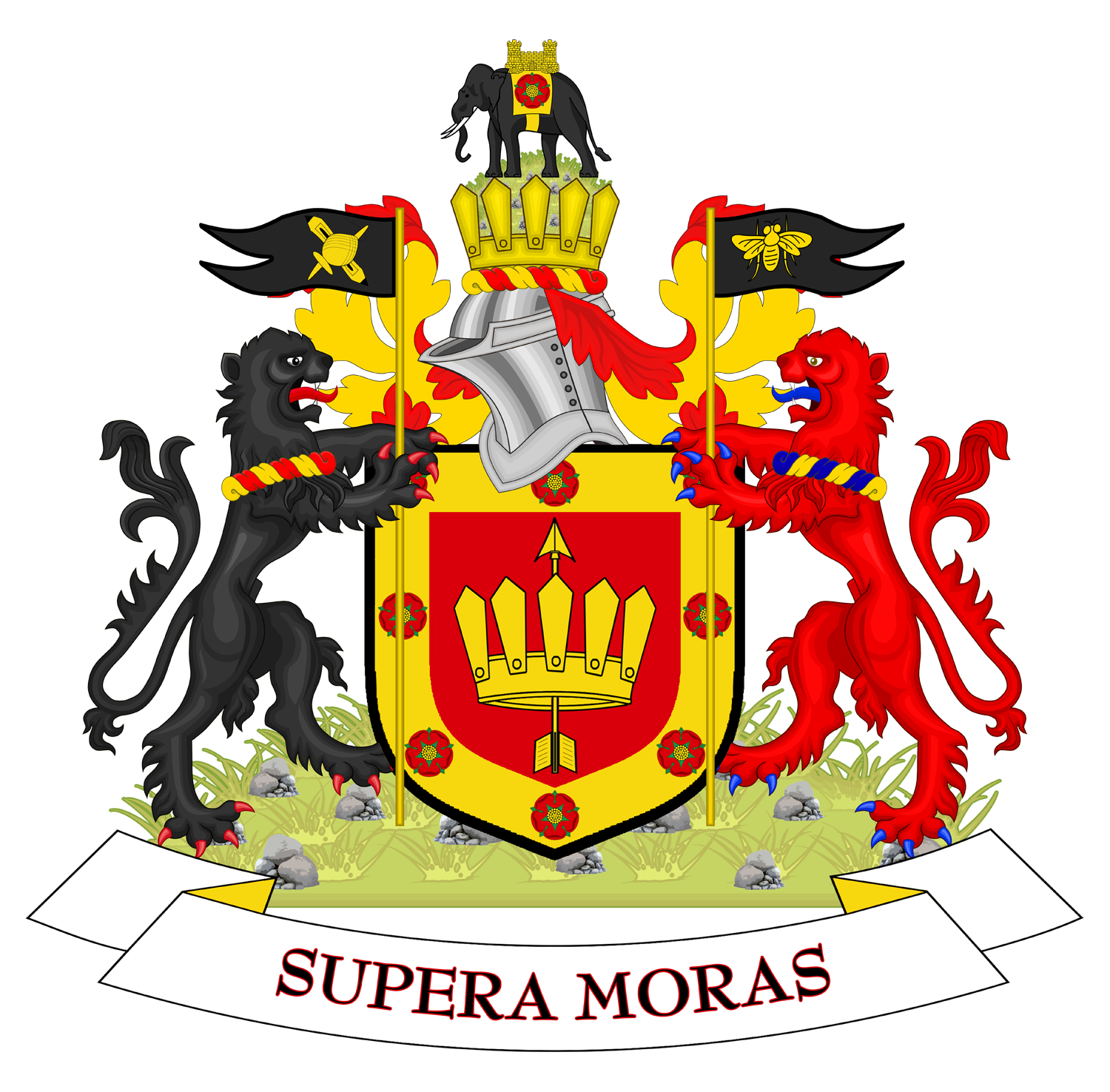
- 7 May 2026

20 out of 60 seats to Bolton Council 31 seats needed for a majority
	First party	Second party	Third party
Leader	Nick Peel	Nadim Muslim	Trevor Jones
Party	Labour	Conservative	Reform
Leader's seat	Tonge with the Haulgh (defeated)	Bromley Cross	Tonge with the Haulgh
Last election	26 seats, 33.7%	15 seats, 19.5%	0 seats, 11.0% (Note: As their local affiliate "Bolton for Change")
Seats before	25	15	1
Seats won	2	3	9
Seats after	20	11	10
Seat change	▼5	▼4	▲9
Popular vote	16,905	12,433	28,102
Percentage	19.6%	14.4%	32.6%
Swing	▼14.1pp	▼5.1pp	▲21.6pp
	Fourth party	Fifth party	Sixth party
Leader	Garry Veevers	Hanif Alli	David Grant
Party	Liberal Democrats	Green	Horwich and Blackrod First
Leader's seat	Smithills	Halliwell	Horwich South and Blackrod
Last election	6 seats, 7.4%	1 seat, 8.9%	6 seats, 7.4%
Seats before	6	1	3
Seats won	1	3	2
Seats after	5	4	4
Seat change	▼1	▲3	▲1
Popular vote	6,345	15,210	3,680
Percentage	7.4%	17.6%	4.3%
Swing	0.0pp	▲8.7pp	▼3.1pp
	Seventh party	Eighth party
Leader	Tracey Wilkinson
Party	Farnworth and Kearsley First	Independent
Leader's seat	Kearsley (defeated)
Last election	5 seats, 4.0%	1 seat, 5.5%
Seats before	5	4
Seats won	0	0
Seats after	3	3
Seat change	▼2	▼1
Popular vote	2,745	679
Percentage	3.2%	0.8%
Swing	▼0.8pp	▼4.7pp
- Winner of each seat at the 2026 Bolton Council election.
Leader before election
Nick Peel
Labour
No overall control (Note: Labour minority.)
Leader after election
Akhtar Zaman
Labour
No overall control (Note: Labour minority.)

The 2026 Bolton Council election took place on Thursday 7 May 2026, alongside other local elections in the United Kingdom. One third of the 60 members of Bolton Council in Greater Manchester were elected.

Prior to the election, the council was under no overall control. Labour were the largest party and ran the council as a minority administration. At this election, the council remained under no overall control. Labour lost seats, but remained the largest party. One of those to lose their seat was the incumbent leader of the council, Nick Peel. Reform UK made the most gains, winning nine of the twenty seats being contested. After the election, Labour chose Akhtar Zaman to be its new group leader. He was formally appointed as the new leader of the council at the subsequent annual council meeting on 20 May 2026, leading a Labour minority administration.

== Council composition ==
After 2024 election		Before 2026 election	
Party	Seats	Party	Seats
Labour	26	Labour	25
Conservative	15	Conservative	15
Liberal Democrats	6	Liberal Democrats	6
Farnworth and Kearsley First	5	Farnworth and Kearsley First	5
Horwich and Blackrod First	6	Horwich and Blackrod First	3
Green	1 (Note: Sits as part of the Communities First group with the label "Green Party/Communities First".)	Green	1
Independent	1	Independent	5
Reform	0	Reform	1

Changes 2024–2026:

- June 2024: Ryan Bamforth (Horwich and Blackrod First) leaves party to sit as an independent (Note: Part of the Communities First group, which is not registered as a political party.)
- November 2024: Charlotte Sears (Horwich and Blackrod First) and Samantha Williamson (Horwich and Blackrod First) leave party to sit as independents
- August 2025: Susan Haworth (Labour) leaves party to sit as an independent
- December 2025: Susan Haworth (Independent) joins Reform

== Summary ==
=== Background ===
Bolton Metropolitan Borough Council was created in 1974. The Conservatives briefly held control until Labour won their first majority in 1976. Labour formed a majority administration until 2003 when the council fell into no overall control. This lasted until 2011.

The 2019 election saw Labour reduced to minority status with 24 seats. The Conservatives formed a minority administration with support from UKIP, Farnworth and Kearsley First, and Horwich and Blackrod First. The Conservatives became the largest party on the council in 2021, and retained minority control until 2023 when Labour once again became the largest party. Labour formed a minority administration with the support of Farnworth and Kearsley First and Horwich and Blackrod First which continues to govern.

The 2023 election was held under a new set of boundaries, meaning that this election is for the councillors who placed second in each of the three-member wards. Labour will be defending 7 seats, the Conservatives will be defending 7, the Liberal Democrats will be defending 2, Horwich and Blackrod First will be defending 2, and Farnworth and Kearsley First will be defending 2 (including a seat in Kearsley gained in a 2023 by-election).

=== Election result ===
2026 Bolton Metropolitan Borough Council election
Party	This election				Full council			This election		
Party	Candidates	Seats	Net	Seats %	Other	Total	Total %	Votes	Votes %	+/−
Labour	{{{candidates}}}	2	▼5	10.0	18	20	33.3	16,844	19.5	-14.2
Conservative	{{{candidates}}}	3	▼4	15.0	8	11	18.3	12,433	14.4	-5.1
Reform	{{{candidates}}}	9	▲9	45.0	1	10	16.7	28,105	32.6	+21.6
Liberal Democrats	{{{candidates}}}	1	▼1	5.0	4	5	8.3	6,387	7.4	±0.0
Green	{{{candidates}}}	3	▲3	15.0	1	4	6.7	15,210	17.6	+8.7
Horwich and Blackrod First	{{{candidates}}}	2	▲1	10.0	2	4	6.7	3,680	4.3	-3.1
Farnworth and Kearsley First	{{{candidates}}}	0	▼2	0.0	3	3	5.0	2,753	3.2	-0.8
Independent	{{{candidates}}}	0	▼1	0.0	3	3	5.0	679	0.8	-4.7
Westhoughton First Independents	{{{candidates}}}	0	Steady	0.0	0	0	0.0	100	0.1	-0.4
Advance UK	{{{candidates}}}	0	Steady	0.0	0	0	0.0	71	0.1	N/A
TUSC	{{{candidates}}}	0	Steady	0.0	0	0	0.0	40	0.0	N/A

== Incumbents ==
Ward	Incumbent councillor	Party	Re-standing
Astley Bridge	John Walsh	Conservative	Yes
Bradshaw	Les Webb	Conservative	Yes
Breightmet	Adele Warren	Conservative	Yes
Bromley Cross	Amy Cowen	Conservative	No
Farnworth North	Nadeem Ayub	Labour	Yes
Farnworth South	Paul Sanders	Farnworth and Kearsley First	Yes
Great Lever	Mohammed Iqbal	Labour	Yes
Halliwell	Safwaan Patel	Labour	Yes
Heaton, Lostock & Chew Moor	Anne Galloway	Conservative	Yes
Horwich North	Charlotte Moncado-Sears	Independent	Yes
Horwich South & Blackrod	Peter Wright	Horwich and Blackrod First	Yes
Hulton	Aalaina Khan	Labour	No
Kearsley	Tracey Wilkinson	Farnworth and Kearsley First	Yes
Little Lever & Darcy Lever	David Meehan	Conservative	Yes
Queens Park & Central	Richard Silvester	Labour Co-op	Yes
Rumworth	Sajid Ali	Labour	Yes
Smithills	Susan Priest	Liberal Democrats	Yes
Tonge with the Haulgh	Nicholas Peel	Labour Co-op	Yes
Westhoughton North & Hunger Hill	Martin Tighe	Conservative	Yes
Westhoughton South	David Wilkinson	Liberal Democrats	Yes

== Wards ==
=== Astley Bridge ===
Astley Bridge
Party	Candidate	Votes	%	±%
Reform	Ryan Bailey	1,635	32.7	+22.2
Conservative	John Walsh	1,248	25.0	−13.0
Green	Lee Thorne	1,147	23.0	+9.5
Labour	Phil Warren	807	16.2	−21.8
Liberal Democrats	Sarita Chohan	106	2.1	N/A
Independent	Peter Brett Hopkinson	53	1.1	N/A
Majority		387	7.7	
Turnout		4,996		
Reform gain from Conservative				

=== Bradshaw Ward ===
Bradshaw
Party	Candidate	Votes	%	±%
Conservative	Les Webb	1,801	37.4	−1.6
Reform	Sandra Harris	1,712	35.6	+23.4
Labour Co-op	Peter Firth	745	15.5	−24.8
Green	Jennifer Entwistle	423	8.8	+3.3
Liberal Democrats	Christine Strawbridge	130	2.7	−0.8
Majority		89	1.8	
Turnout		4,811		
Conservative hold				

=== Breightmet ===
Breightmet
Party	Candidate	Votes	%	±%
Reform	Mike Tucker	1,890	47.3	+33.4
Conservative	Adele Warren	974	24.4	−12.7
Labour Co-op	Kate Taylor	605	15.1	−27.3
Green	Gillian Fernley	413	10.3	+5.7
Liberal Democrats	Derek Gradwell	80	2.0	−/+ 0
Independent	Wendy Hopkinson	33	0.8	N/A
Majority		916	22.9	
Turnout		3,995		
Reform gain from Conservative				

=== Bromley Cross ===
Bromley Cross
Party	Candidate	Votes	%	±%
Conservative	Charlotte Cadden	1,794	36.3	−10.0
Reform	Jayden Cain	1,669	33.8	+24.1
Green	Joe Burton	718	14.5	+9.1
Labour	Bill Lovat	597	12.1	−23.6
Liberal Democrats	Jim Priest	164	3.3	+0.3
Majority		125	2.5	
Turnout		4,942		
Conservative hold				

=== Farnworth North ===
Farnworth North
Party	Candidate	Votes	%	±%
Labour	Nadeem Ayub	1,131	29.0	−3.8
Reform	Rees Gibbon	1,109	28.4	+17.6
Green	Philip Kochitty	648	16.6	+6.7
Farnworth and Kearsley First	Sandra Baker	642	16.4	−8.9
Independent	Champak Mistry	235	6.0	N/A
Conservative	Ryan Cain	103	2.6	−16.2
Liberal Democrats	Andrew Tonge	35	0.9	−1.7
Majority		22	0.6	
Turnout		3,903		
Labour hold				

=== Farnworth South ===
Farnworth South
Party	Candidate	Votes	%	±%
Reform	Julie Pattison	1,220	41.4	+28.5
Farnworth and Kearsley First	Paul Sanders	956	32.2	−10.9
Labour	Wesley McArdle	343	11.6	−21.6
Green	David Wright	338	11.5	+6.9
Conservative	Kubbar Alom	59	2.0	−2.6
Liberal Democrats	Jennifer Tonge	40	1.4	−0.1
Majority		270	9.2	
Turnout		2,956		
Reform gain from Farnworth and Kearsley First				

=== Great Lever ===
Great Lever
Party	Candidate	Votes	%	±%
Labour	Mohammed Iqbal	1,918	45.8	−2.6
Green	Mahboob Alom	1,239	29.6	−2.5
Reform	Gus Heyes	755	18.0	+6.7
Conservative	Yusuf Butt	159	3.8	−4.4
Liberal Democrats	Rishikesh Ratilal Chohan	116	2.8	N/A
Majority		679	16.2	
Turnout		4,187		
Labour hold				

=== Halliwell ===
Halliwell
Party	Candidate	Votes	%	±%
Green	Baggy Khan	1,752	41.8	−3.3
Labour	Safwaan Patel	1,444	34.5	−3.2
Reform	Philip Booth	744	17.8	N/A
Conservative	Elizabeth Elliott	136	3.2	−0.7
Liberal Democrats	Caroline Turner-Preece	115	2.7	−2.6
Majority		308	7.3	
Turnout		4,191		
Green gain from Labour				

=== Heaton, Lostock and Chew Moor ===
Heaton, Lostock and Chew Moor
Party	Candidate	Votes	%	±%
Conservative	Anne Galloway	2,112	37.6	−6.6
Reform	Hetan Ajwani	1,374	24.5	+17.4
Labour	Salim Qureshi	1,065	19.0	−6.3
Green	Alexander James Rostron	760	13.5	+5.5
Liberal Democrats	Paul Martin	299	5.3	+1.0
Majority		738	13.2	
Turnout		5,610		
Conservative hold				

=== Horwich North ===
Horwich North
Party	Candidate	Votes	%	±%
Horwich and Blackrod First	Andrea Finney	1,905	39.3	−13.5
Reform	Stephen Martindale	1,243	25.6	+22.0
Green	Helena Carman	585	12.1	+8.2
Labour	Graham Dawson	536	11.0	−25.5
Conservative	Carol Forshaw	257	5.3	−4.7
Independent	Charlotte Moncado-Sears	252	5.2	N/A
Liberal Democrats	Scott Turner-Preece	74	1.5	−1.8
Majority		662	13.6	
Turnout		4,852		
Horwich and Blackrod First gain from Independent				

=== Horwich South and Blackrod ===
Horwich South and Blackrod
Party	Candidate	Votes	%	±%
Horwich and Blackrod First	Peter Wright	1,775	44.3	−4.1
Reform	Matthew Kyle	1,060	26.4	+22.0
Labour	Joshua Cook	378	9.4	−18.8
Green	Michael Jarvis	375	9.4	+5.9
Conservative	Paul Norris	293	7.3	−5.7
Liberal Democrats	John Strawbridge	79	2.0	−0.5
Independent	Antony Moncado-Sears	49	1.2	N/A
Majority		715	17.8	
Turnout		4,009		
Horwich and Blackrod First hold				

=== Hulton ===
Hulton
Party	Candidate	Votes	%	±%
Reform	Derek Bullock	1,939	43.1	−34.4
Labour	Emma Schofield	979	21.8	−8.1
Green	Alan Johnson	947	21.1	+15.4
Conservative	Shafi Patel	470	10.5	−9.8
Liberal Democrats	Linda Maher	160	3.6	+0.9
Majority		960	21.4	
Turnout		4,495		
Reform gain from Labour				

=== Kearsley ===
Kearsley
Party	Candidate	Votes	%	±%
Reform	Roger Pedley	1,564	46.3	+40.2
Farnworth and Kearsley First	Tracey Wilkinson	1,155	34.2	−15.7
Labour Co-op	George Butler	255	7.6	−27.2
Green	Tony Peers	176	5.2	+3.1
Conservative	Glenys Ratcliffe	103	3.1	−2.7
Advance UK	Jack Tebay	71	2.1	N/A
Liberal Democrats	David Charles Tyas Cooper	49	1.5	+0.2
Majority		408	12.1	
Turnout		3,373		
Reform gain from Farnworth and Kearsley First				

=== Little Lever & Darcy Lever ===
Little Lever & Darcy Lever
Party	Candidate	Votes	%	±%
Reform	Derek Wunderley	2,040	48.9	+36.5
Conservative	David Meehan	924	22.1	−5.0
Labour	Rach Gilmour	618	16.3	−21.4
Green	Ben Dolata	345	8.3	N/A
Liberal Democrats	Susan Martin	143	3.4	−0.1
TUSC	Fin Cozens-Stott	40	1.0	N/A
Majority		1,116	26.7	
Turnout		4,110		
Reform gain from Conservative				

=== Queen's Park & Central ===
Queen's Park & Central
Party	Candidate	Votes	%	±%
Green	Zan Arif	1,090	35.5	+27.9
Labour Co-op	Richard Silvester	1,044	34.0	−9.7
Reform	Nimesh Vara	609	19.9	N/A
Conservative	Richard Elliott	206	6.7	+0.9
Liberal Democrats	Rebekah Fairhurst	160	3.8	+0.5
Majority		46	1.5	N/A
Turnout		3,109		
Green gain from Labour Co-op				

=== Rumworth ===
Rumworth
Party	Candidate	Votes	%	±%
Green	Ismail Ibrahim	2,346	49.7	+36.4
Labour	Sajid Ali	1,659	35.1	+4.9
Reform	Ghansham Hirji Patel	463	9.8	N/A
Liberal Democrats	Gillian Wroe	137	2.9	+1.7
Conservative	Shahjahan Shah	119	2.5	−1.2
Majority		687	14.5	N/A
Turnout		4,724		
Green gain from Labour				

=== Smithills ===
Smithills
Party	Candidate	Votes	%	±%
Liberal Democrats	Sue Priest	1,713	37.6	−8.3
Reform	Simon Roscoe	1,565	34.3	+24.4
Green	Elora Hunt	563	12.4	+0.2
Labour	Liam O'Callaghan	533	11.7	−11.6
Conservative	Raymond Ndokwo	184	4.0	−4.7
Majority		148	3.2	
Turnout		4,558		
Liberal Democrats hold				

=== Tonge with the Haulgh ===
Tonge with the Haulgh
Party	Candidate	Votes	%	±%
Reform	Trevor Jones	2,089	47.1	+18.6
Labour Co-op	Nick Peel	1,329	30.0	−14.8
Green	Gaynor Richards	600	13.5	+6.6
Conservative	Hafiz Butt	251	5.7	−10.3
Liberal Democrats	Rebecca Forrest	166	3.7	−0.2
Majority		760	17.1	N/A
Turnout		4,435		
Reform gain from Labour Co-op				

=== Westhoughton North & Hunger Hill ===
Westhoughton North & Hunger Hill
Party	Candidate	Votes	%	±%
Reform	David Lewis	1,781	38.2	+28.9
Liberal Democrats	Neil Maher	1,071	23.0	−10.8
Conservative	Martin Tighe	964	20.7	−4.3
Green	Louise Warburton	439	9.4	+6.4
Labour	Paul Leslie Saunders	403	8.7	−14.4
Majority		710	15.2	
Turnout		4,658		
Reform gain from Conservative				

=== Westhoughton South ===
Westhoughton South
Party	Candidate	Votes	%	±%
Reform	Glen Clarke	1,644	37.5	+28.5
Liberal Democrats	David Wilkinson	1,550	35.3	+3.7
Labour	Christina Saunders	455	10.4	−24.8
Green	Simon Penhallow	306	7.0	+4.3
Conservative	Colin Higson	276	6.3	−6.3
Westhoughton First	Jack Speight	100	2.3	−3.7
Independent	Richard Bates	57	1.3	N/A
Majority		94	2.1	
Turnout		4,388		
Reform gain from Liberal Democrats				

== Post-election changes ==
=== By-elections ===
==== Rumworth ====
Rumworth by-election: 30 July 2026 Resignation of Abdul Atcha (Labour)
Party	Candidate	Votes	%	±%
Independent	Yusuf Davda	1,458	42.3	N/A
Labour	Sajid Pathan	1,054	30.6	−4.6
Green	Alan Johnson	517	15.0	−34.7
Reform	Gansham Patel	279	8.1	−1.7
Conservative	Marcellus Mbah	60	1.7	−0.8
Independent	Wendy Hopkinson	45	1.3	N/A
Liberal Democrats	Gillian Wroe	37	1.1	−1.8
Majority		404	11.7	N/A
Turnout		3,450		
Independent gain from Labour				

==== Westhoughton South ====
Westhoughton South by-election: 10 December 2026
Party	Candidate	Votes	%	±%
Green	Azad Ahmad			
Conservative	Colin Higson			
Westhoughton First	Jack Speight			
Reform	Martin Tighe			
Restore	Jud Valentine			
Labour	Victoria Whittle			
Liberal Democrats	David Wilkinson			
Majority				
Turnout				
		Swing		
