= 2024 Bolton Metropolitan Borough Council election =

2024 local election in Bolton

- 2 May 2024

20 out of 60 seats to Bolton Metropolitan Borough Council 31 seats needed for a majority

	First party	Second party	Third party
Leader	Nick Peel	Martyn Cox	Roger Hayes
Party	Labour	Conservative	Liberal Democrats
Last election	26 seats, 40.4%	17 seats, 32.7%	6 seat, 9.8%
Seats before	27	15	7
Seats won	9	3	2
Seats after	26	15	6
Seat change	▼1	Steady	▼1
Popular vote	24,475	14,124	5,388
Percentage	33.7%	19.5%	7.4%
Swing	▼6.7%	▼13.2%	▼2.4%
	Fourth party	Fifth party	Sixth party
Leader	David Grant	Paul Sanders
Party	Horwich and Blackrod First	Farnworth and Kearsley First	Green
Last election	6 seats, 4.8%	2 seats, 1.6%	0 seats, 1.8%
Seats before	6 (Note: Including one vacant seat at Horwich North last held by the party.)	3	0
Seats won	3	2	1
Seats after	6	5	1
Seat change	Steady	▲2	▲1
Popular vote	5,370	2,900	6,493
Percentage	7.4%	4.0%	8.9%
Swing	▲2.6%	▲2.4%	▲7.1%
	Seventh party
Party	Independent
Last election	0 seats, 0.9%
Seats before	2
Seats won	1
Seats after	1
Seat change	▼1
Popular vote	3,964
Percentage	5.5%
Swing	▲4.6%
- Winner of each seat at the 2024 Bolton Metropolitan Borough Council election
Leader before election
Nick Peel
Labour Party
No overall control
Leader after election
Nick Peel
Labour Party
No overall control

The 2024 Bolton Metropolitan Borough Council election took place on 2 May 2024. The election took place alongside other local elections across the United Kingdom. The council remained under no overall control and continued to be run by a Labour minority administration.

== Background ==
Result of the most recent council election in 2023

In December 2022, the Local Government Boundary Commission for England made The Bolton (Electoral Changes) Order 2022, which officially abolished all 20 existing wards and established 20 new wards with new boundaries. All 60 wards were contested at the 2023 elections. The elected councillor who received the least number of votes in each ward at the previous election will have their seat up in this election.

== Electoral process ==
The council elects its councillors in thirds, with a third being up for election every year for three years, with no election in the fourth year. The election will take place by first-past-the-post voting, with wards being represented by three councillors, with one elected in each election year to serve a four-year term.

All registered electors (British, Irish, Commonwealth and European Union citizens) living in Bolton aged 18 or over will be entitled to vote in the election. People who live at two addresses in different councils, such as university students with different term-time and holiday addresses, are entitled to be registered for and vote in elections in both local authorities. Voting in-person at polling stations will take place from 07:00 to 22:00 on election day, and voters will be able to apply for postal votes or proxy votes in advance of the election.

== Previous council composition ==
After 2023 election		Before 2024 election		After 2024 election	
Party	Seats	Party	Seats	Party	Seats
Labour	26	Labour	27	Labour	26
Conservative	17	Conservative	15	Conservative	15
Liberal Democrats	6	Liberal Democrats	7	Liberal Democrats	6
Horwich and Blackrod First	6	Horwich and Blackrod First	6	Horwich and Blackrod First	6
Farnworth and Kearsley First	2	Farnworth and Kearsley First	3	Farnworth and Kearsley First	5
Green	0	Green	0	Green	1
Independent	0	Independent	2	Independent	1
One Kearsley	3	One Kearsley	0	One Kearsley	0

Changes 2023–2024:

- 4 May 2023: Derek Bullock (Conservative) was re-elected at the 2023 elections as a Conservative after being selected by the local Conservative Association, but has sat as an independent after being expelled by the national Conservative Party in April 2023 due to racist comments.
- 2 October 2023: Paul Heslop (One Kearsley) resigns; by-election scheduled for 16 November 2023.
- 2 October 2023: Bernadette Eckersley-Fallon (Conservative) resigns; by-election scheduled for 16 November 2023.
- 3 October 2023: Debbie Newall and Melanie Livsey (One Kearsley) join the Labour Party, marking the dissolution of their former party.
- 16 November 2023: Tracey Wilkinson wins Kearsley by-election; Farnworth and Kearsley First gain seat from One Kearsley.
- 16 November 2023: Deirdre McGeown wins Westhoughton North and Hunger Hill by-election; Liberal Democrats gain seat from the Conservatives.
- 14 March 2024: Craig Rotheram (Horwich and Blackrod First) resigns; by-election scheduled for 2 May 2024.
- April 2024: Amjid (Jack) Khan (Rumworth) expelled from Labour for seeking to stand as an MP for other parties.

== Summary ==
Following the election the council remained under no overall control. Labour made a net loss of one seat from their pre-election position, but remained the largest party and continued to form a minority administration after the election.

=== Election result ===
2024 Bolton Metropolitan Borough Council election
Party	This election			Full council			This election		
Party	Seats	Net	Seats %	Other	Total	Total %	Votes	Votes %	+/−
Labour	9	▼1	42.9	17	26	44.1	24,475	33.7	–6.7
Conservative	3	Steady	14.3	12	15	25.4	14,124	19.5	–13.2
Liberal Democrats	2	▼1	9.5	4	6	10.2	5,388	7.4	–2.4
Horwich and Blackrod First	3	Steady	14.3	3	6	10.2	5,370	7.4	+2.6
Farnworth and Kearsley First	2	▲2	9.5	2	4	6.8	2,900	4.0	+2.4
Green	1	▲1	4.8	0	1	1.7	6,493	8.9	+7.1
Independent	1	▼1	4.8	0	1	1.7	3,964	5.5	+4.6
Bolton for Change	0	Steady	0.0	0	0	0.0	8,020	11.0	+6.1
Workers Party	0	Steady	0.0	0	0	0.0	1,388	1.9	N/A
Westhoughton First	0	Steady	0.0	0	0	0.0	385	0.5	+0.1
UKIP	0	Steady	0.0	0	0	0.0	98	0.1	N/A

== Ward results ==
The results for each ward were as follows, with sitting councillors standing for re-election marked with an asterisk.

=== Astley Bridge ===
Astley Bridge
Party	Candidate	Votes	%	±%
Conservative	Toby Hewitt	1,560	38.0	–6.5
Labour Co-op	Kate Taylor*	1,559	38.0	+2.7
Green	Mark Devereux	555	13.5	+4.4
Bolton for Change	Mike Armstrong	433	10.5	+5.0
Majority		1	0.0	N/A
Turnout		4,107		
Conservative gain from Labour Co-op		Swing	▲4.6	

=== Bradshaw ===
Bradshaw
Party	Candidate	Votes	%	±%
Labour Co-op	Jackie Schofield	1,436	40.3	+5.4
Conservative	Ciaran Tully	1,388	39.0	–8.2
Bolton for Change	Sandra Harris	433	12.2	+4.1
Green	Matthew Miller	177	5.0	N/A
Liberal Democrats	Becky Forrest	125	3.5	–6.4
Majority		48	1.3	N/A
Turnout		3,559		
Labour Co-op gain from Conservative		Swing	▲6.8	

=== Breightmet ===
Breightmet
Party	Candidate	Votes	%	±%
Labour Co-op	Robert Morrisey*	1,293	42.4	+1.1
Conservative	Becky Campbell	1,130	37.1	–5.3
Bolton for Change	Georgia Lloyd	425	13.9	+2.1
Green	Wendy Shepherd	139	4.6	N/A
Liberal Democrats	Derek Gradwell	60	2.0	–2.6
Majority		163	5.3	N/A
Turnout		3,047		
Labour Co-op hold		Swing	▲3.2	

=== Bromley Cross ===
Bromley Cross
Party	Candidate	Votes	%	±%
Conservative	Nadim Muslim*	1,763	46.3	–1.6
Labour	Ian Brown	1,359	35.7	+5.5
Bolton for Change	Amy Hare	368	9.7	+1.2
Green	Lee Harrison	204	5.4	–3.2
Liberal Democrats	Peter Priest	113	3.0	–1.8
Majority		404	10.6	
Turnout		3,807		
Conservative hold		Swing	▼3.6	

=== Farnworth North ===
Farnworth North
Party	Candidate	Votes	%	±%
Labour	Susan Haworth*	908	32.8	–19.4
Farnworth and Kearsley First	Mark Bailey	700	25.3	N/A
Conservative	Mazhar Iqbal	520	18.8	+0.3
Bolton for Change	Dylan Evans	298	10.8	–6.2
Green	Philip Kochitty	273	9.9	+2.0
Liberal Democrats	Jennifer Tonge	71	2.6	–1.7
Majority		208	7.5	N/A
Turnout		2,770		
Labour hold				

=== Farnworth South ===
Farnworth South
Party	Candidate	Votes	%	±%
Farnworth and Kearsley First	Paula Connor-Bennett	975	43.1	+0.4
Labour	Champak Mistry*	752	33.2	+0.7
Bolton for Change	Julie Pattison	292	12.9	–0.8
Conservative	Carol Forshaw	105	4.6	–1.6
Green	Jordan Greenhalgh	105	4.6	N/A
Liberal Democrats	Andrew Tonge	35	1.5	–3.4
Majority		223	9.9	N/A
Turnout		2,264		
Farnworth and Kearsley First gain from Labour		Swing	▼0.2	

=== Great Lever ===
Great Lever
Party	Candidate	Votes	%	±%
Labour	Karen Hon*	1,521	48.4	–4.5
Green	Mahboob Alom	1,009	32.1	+26.0
Bolton for Change	Tracey Earp	355	11.3	+7.6
Conservative	Kalim Muslim	259	8.2	–26.5
Majority		512	16.3	N/A
Turnout		3,144		
Labour hold		Swing	▼15.3	

=== Halliwell ===
Halliwell
Party	Candidate	Votes	%	±%
Green	Hanif Alli	1,523	45.1	+41.3
Labour Co-op	Kevin Morris*	1,273	37.7	–9.0
Bolton for Change	Norman Cryer	268	7.9	+3.0
Liberal Democrats	Caroline Turner-Preece	178	5.3	+1.9
Conservative	Kubbar Alom	132	3.9	–37.3
Majority		250	7.4	N/A
Turnout		3,374		
Green gain from Labour Co-op		Swing	▲25.2	

=== Heaton, Lostock & Chew Moor ===
Heaton, Lostock & Chew Moor
Party	Candidate	Votes	%	±%
Conservative	Andy Morgan*	1,975	44.2	–2.1
Labour Co-op	Bill Lovat	1,130	25.3	–0.7
Independent	Gordon Campbell	497	11.1	–3.9
Green	Jennifer Entwistle	358	8.0	N/A
Bolton for Change	Graham McGreavy	319	7.1	+1.0
Liberal Democrats	Paul Martin	192	4.3	–2.3
Majority		845	18.9	N/A
Turnout		4,471		
Conservative hold		Swing	▼0.7	

=== Horwich North ===
Horwich North (2 seats due to by-election)
Party	Candidate	Votes	%	±%
Horwich and Blackrod First	Victoria Rigby*	2,028	52.8	+11.4
Horwich and Blackrod First	Charlotte Sears	1,835	47.8	+6.4
Labour	Kevin McKeon	1,401	36.5	+4.7
Labour	George Butler	1,117	29.1	–2.7
Conservative	Michael Baines	385	10.0	–3.6
Conservative	Hannah Wright	319	8.3	–5.3
Green	Glenys Johnson	150	3.9	–1.3
Bolton for Change	Taylor Jones	140	3.6	+0.2
Bolton for Change	Stephen Tonge	128	3.3	–0.1
Liberal Democrats	Matt Turner-Allen	126	3.3	–1.3
Liberal Democrats	Scott Turner-Preece	48	1.3	–3.3
Turnout				
Horwich and Blackrod First hold				
Horwich and Blackrod First hold				

=== Horwich South & Blackrod ===
Horwich South & Blackrod
Party	Candidate	Votes	%	±%
Horwich and Blackrod First	Samantha Williamson*	1,507	48.4	+5.0
Labour	Michael Jarvis	878	28.2	+5.7
Conservative	Paul Norris	404	13.0	–9.0
Bolton for Change	Eddie Carr	138	4.4	+1.1
Green	Helen Alker	109	3.5	–2.5
Liberal Democrats	Liz Turner-Allen	77	2.5	–0.2
Majority		629	20.2	N/A
Turnout		3,113		
Horwich and Blackrod First hold		Swing	▼0.4	

=== Hulton ===
Hulton
Party	Candidate	Votes	%	±%
Labour	Fazeelah Khan	1,213	29.9	–9.1
Conservative	Shafi Patel	824	20.3	–17.8
Independent	Derek Bullock*	786	19.4	N/A
Workers Party	Sajid Pathan	546	13.4	N/A
Bolton for Change	Rob Lowe	354	8.7	+0.6
Green	Pete Hopkinson	231	5.7	–4.2
Liberal Democrats	Linda Maher	108	2.7	–2.3
Majority		389	9.6	N/A
Turnout		4,062		
Labour gain from Independent		Swing	▲4.4	

=== Kearsley ===
Kearsley
Party	Candidate	Votes	%	±%
Farnworth and Kearsley First	Sylvia Crossley	1,225	49.9	+6.3
Labour	Melanie Livesey*	853	34.8	+8.7
Bolton for Change	Dale Gregory	149	6.1	–5.3
Conservative	Glenys Ratcliffe	142	5.8	–11.3
Green	Nadeem Jojo	52	2.1	N/A
Liberal Democrats	Charles Cooper	32	1.3	–0.5
Majority		372	15.1	N/A
Turnout		2,453		
Farnworth and Kearsley First gain from Labour		Swing	▼1.2	

=== Little Lever & Darcy Lever ===
Little Lever & Darcy Lever
Party	Candidate	Votes	%	±%
Labour	Liam Barnard*	1,201	37.7	+9.6
Conservative	Fred Khan	861	27.1	–8.3
Independent	Sean Hornby	615	19.3	–0.1
Bolton for Change	Brett Varnam	393	12.4	–1.4
Liberal Democrats	Susan Martin	112	3.5	+0.2
Majority		340	10.6	N/A
Turnout		3,182		
Labour hold		Swing	▲9.0	

=== Queens Park & Central ===
Queens Park & Central
Party	Candidate	Votes	%	±%
Labour Co-op	Linda Thomas*	1,256	43.7	–23.0
Workers Party	Omar Shafiq	842	29.3	N/A
Bolton for Change	Sandra Harvey	221	7.7	–1.0
Green	Martin McLoughlin	220	7.6	N/A
Conservative	Shahjahan Shah	168	5.8	–8.3
Liberal Democrats	Rebekah Fairhurst	94	3.3	–3.2
Independent	Don Abraham Halliwell	76	2.6	N/A
Majority		414	14.4	N/A
Turnout		2,877		
Labour Co-op hold				

=== Rumworth ===
Rumworth
Party	Candidate	Votes	%	±%
Independent	Ayyub Patel	1,990	48.3	N/A
Labour	Hanif Adia	1,244	30.2	–18.2
Green	Alan Johnson	550	13.3	+6.0
Conservative	Marcellus Mbah	153	3.7	–35.5
Bolton for Change	Colin Speakman	139	3.4	+0.2
Liberal Democrats	Gillian Wroe	48	1.2	–0.7
Majority		746	18.1	N/A
Turnout		4,124		
Independent hold				

=== Smithills ===
Smithills
Party	Candidate	Votes	%	±%
Liberal Democrats	Garry Veevers*	1,690	45.9	–4.9
Labour	Sorie Sesay	859	23.3	–0.8
Green	Vicki Attenborough	448	12.2	+4.7
Bolton for Change	Helen Shaw	365	9.9	+4.6
Conservative	Raymond Ndokwo	319	8.7	–3.7
Majority		831	22.6	N/A
Turnout		3,681		
Liberal Democrats hold		Swing	▼2.6	

=== Tonge with the Haulgh ===
Tonge with the Haulgh
Party	Candidate	Votes	%	±%
Labour Co-op	Emily Mort*	1,300	44.8	–3.7
Bolton for Change	Trevor Jones	827	28.5	+11.7
Conservative	Emma Meen	465	16.0	–8.7
Green	Alexander McAllister	200	6.9	N/A
Liberal Democrats	Frank Harasiwka	113	3.9	–2.3
Majority		473	16.3	N/A
Turnout		2,905		
Labour Co-op hold		Swing	▼7.7	

=== Westhoughton North & Hunger Hill ===
Westhoughton North & Hunger Hill
Party	Candidate	Votes	%	±%
Liberal Democrats	Deirdre McGeown*	1,137	33.8	+3.6
Conservative	Colin Higson	842	25.1	–4.4
Labour	Karen Millington	776	23.1	+2.9
Bolton for Change	Jennifer Armstrong	314	9.3	+4.2
Westhoughton First	Jill Reynolds	189	5.6	–4.8
Green	Charlie Barrett	102	3.0	–1.6
Majority		295	8.7	N/A
Turnout		3,360		
Liberal Democrats hold		Swing	▲4.0	

=== Westhoughton South ===
Westhoughton South
Party	Candidate	Votes	%	±%
Labour	John McHugh	1,146	35.2	+2.2
Liberal Democrats	Neil Maher*	1,029	31.6	–0.8
Conservative	Cathryn Norris	410	12.6	–5.5
Bolton for Change	Dave Price	292	9.0	+2.4
Westhoughton First	Jack Speight	196	6.0	–3.9
UKIP	Richard Bates	98	3.0	N/A
Green	Heather Rylance	88	2.7	N/A
Majority		117	3.6	N/A
Turnout		3,259		
Labour gain from Liberal Democrats		Swing	▲1.5	
