= 2023 Bolton Metropolitan Borough Council election =

2023 local election in Bolton

- 4 May 2023

All 60 seats to Bolton Metropolitan Borough Council 31 seats needed for a majority
	First party	Second party	Third party
Leader	Nick Peel	Martyn Cox	Roger Hayes
Party	Labour	Conservative	Liberal Democrats
Seats before	19	26	5
Seats won	26	17	6
Seat change	▲7	▼9	▲1
	Fourth party	Fifth party	Sixth party
Party	Horwich and Blackrod First	One Kearsley	Farnworth and Kearsley First
Seats before	2	2	3
Seats won	6	3	2
Seat change	▲4	▲1	▼1
- Winner of each seat at the 2023 Bolton Metropolitan Borough Council election
Leader before election
Martyn Cox
Conservative
No overall control
Leader after election
Nick Peel
Labour Party
No overall control

The 2023 Bolton Metropolitan Borough Council elections took place on 4 May 2023 alongside other local elections across the United Kingdom. Due to boundary changes, all 60 seats on Bolton Metropolitan Borough Council were up for election.

The council remained in no overall control following the election, however the Labour Party, with the support of Horwich and Blackrod First and One Kearsley, were able to displace the Conservative Party's minority administration and install their group leader Nick Peel as the new leader of the council.

== Background ==
The Local Government Act 1972 created a two-tier system of metropolitan counties and districts covering Greater Manchester, Merseyside, South Yorkshire, Tyne and Wear, the West Midlands, and West Yorkshire starting in 1974. Bolton was a district of the Greater Manchester metropolitan county. The Local Government Act 1985 abolished the metropolitan counties, with metropolitan districts taking on most of their powers as metropolitan boroughs. The Greater Manchester Combined Authority was created in 2011 and began electing the mayor of Greater Manchester from 2017, which was given strategic powers covering a region coterminous with the former Greater Manchester metropolitan county.

In December 2022 the Local Government Boundary Commission for England made The Bolton (Electoral Changes) Order 2022, which officially abolished all 20 existing wards and established 20 new wards with new boundaries. Because of this change all 60 seats on the council, three per ward, were contested.

=== Pre- election composition ===
Composition of council before election
Party	Seats
Conservative Party	26
Labour Party	19
Liberal Democrats	5
Farnworth and Kearsley First	3
Horwich and Blackrod First	2
Bolton Independent Group	2
One Kearsley	2
Little Lever and Darcy Lever First	1
Crompton Independent	1
Independent	2

== Electoral process ==
The election took place using the plurality block voting system, a form of first-past-the-post voting, with each wards being represented by three councillors. The candidate with the most votes in each ward will serve a four year term ending in 2027, the second-placed candidate will serve a three year term ending in 2026 and the third-placed candidate will serve a one year term ending in 2024.

All registered electors (British, Irish, Commonwealth and European Union citizens) living in Bolton aged 18 or over were entitled to vote in the election. People who lived at two addresses in different councils, such as university students with different term-time and holiday addresses, were entitled to be registered for and vote in elections in both local authorities. Voting in-person at polling stations took place from 07:00 to 22:00 on election day, and voters were able to apply for postal votes or proxy votes in advance of the election.

== Results ==
2023 Bolton Metropolitan Borough Council election
Party	Seats	Net gain/loss	Seats %	Votes %	Votes	+/−
Labour	26	7 ▲	43.3	40.4	76,906	
Conservative	17	9 ▼	16.7	32.7	62,117	
Liberal Democrats	6	1 ▲	10.0	9.8	18,636	
Reform UK & Bolton for Change	0	0		4.9	9,296	
Horwich and Blackrod First	6	4 ▲	10.0	4.8	9,182	
One Kearsley	3	1 ▲	5.0	2.0	3,814	
Green	0	0		1.8	3,388	
Farnworth and Kearsley First	2	1 ▼	3.3	1.6	3,043	
The Independent Choice	0	0		0.9	1,621	
Little Lever & Darcy Lever First	0	0		0.7	1,246	
Westhoughton First Independents	0	0		0.4	742	
Northern Heart	0	0		0.1	218	
Independent	0	0		0.0	30	

Asterisks (*) denote incumbent councillors seeking re-election.

=== Astley Bridge ===
Astley Bridge (3)
Party	Candidate	Votes	%	±%
Conservative	Hilary Constance Fairclough*	2,031	50.4	
Conservative	John Walsh*	1,695	42.1	
Labour	Kate Taylor	1,613	40.1	
Labour	Steve Sutton	1,599	39.7	
Conservative	Samuel James Rimmer*	1,594	39.6	
Labour	Haziq Zaman	1,339	33.3	
Green	Mark Devereux	418	10.4	
Liberal Democrats	James Peter Haslam	257	6.4	
Reform UK & Bolton for Change	Michael Armstrong	250	6.2	
Liberal Democrats	Kevin Mulligan	175	4.3	
Liberal Democrats	Jennifer Tonge	170	4.2	
Turnout		4,026	35.19	
Registered electors		11,442		
Conservative win (new boundaries)				
Conservative win (new boundaries)				
Labour win (new boundaries)				

=== Bradshaw ===
Bradshaw (3)
Party	Candidate	Votes	%	±%
Conservative	James Moller	1,658	49.4	
Conservative	Les Webb	1,637	48.8	
Conservative	Mudasir Dean*	1,536	45.8	
Labour	Kate Challender*	1,224	36.5	
Labour	Bill Lovat	1,082	32.3	
Labour	Salim Kureshi	990	29.5	
Liberal Democrats	Stephen Frederick Howarth	347	10.3	
Liberal Democrats	Jim Robertson	330	9.8	
Reform UK & Bolton for Change	Sandra Jayne Harris	283	8.4	
Liberal Democrats	Doug Bagnall	249	7.4	
Turnout		3,355	35.04	
Registered electors		9,574		
Conservative win (new boundaries)				
Conservative win (new boundaries)				
Conservative win (new boundaries)				

=== Breightmet ===
Breightmet (3)
Party	Candidate	Votes	%	±%
Labour Co-op	Sean Eric Fielding	1,382	44.8	
Conservative	Adele Warren*	1,293	41.9	
Labour Co-op	Robert John Morrisey	1,260	40.8	
Conservative	Stuart Hartigan*	1,232	40.0	
Conservative	Malaika Noor Aysha Jabeen Taj Dean	1,146	37.1	
Labour	Uju Roseline Ulasi	1,131	36.6	
Reform UK & Bolton for Change	Carol Jane Turner	359	11.6	
Reform UK & Bolton for Change	Jennifer Ann Sayers	342	11.1	
Reform UK & Bolton for Change	Dale Gregory	277	9.0	
Liberal Democrats	Hugh Godfrey	141	4.6	
Turnout		3,086	28.82	
Registered electors		10,705		
Labour win (new boundaries)				
Conservative win (new boundaries)				
Labour win (new boundaries)				

=== Bromley Cross ===
Bromley Cross (3)
Party	Candidate	Votes	%	±%
Conservative	Samantha Connor*	1,903	52.4	
Conservative	Amy Cowen*	1,883	51.8	
Conservative	Nadim Muslim*	1,627	44.8	
Labour	Ian Philip Brown	1,201	33.1	
Labour	Paul Gerard Canning	1,195	32.9	
Labour	Gaynor Louise Cox	1,047	28.8	
Green	Lee Harrison	343	9.4	
Reform UK & Bolton for Change	Laura Jane Armstrong	338	9.3	
Liberal Democrats	Jenn Wilkes	191	5.3	
Liberal Democrats	Clive Richard Atty	183	5.0	
Reform UK & Bolton for Change	Amy Perrigo	173	4.8	
Reform UK & Bolton for Change	Roland Marsden	153	4.2	
Liberal Democrats	Liz Turner-Allen	125	3.4	
Turnout		3633	37.29	
Registered electors		9,742		
Conservative win (new boundaries)				
Conservative win (new boundaries)				
Conservative win (new boundaries)				

=== Farnworth North ===
Farnworth North (3)
Party	Candidate	Votes	%	±%
Labour	Hamid Ali Khurram*	1,598	55.1	
Labour	Nadeem Ayub*	1,580	54.5	
Labour	Susan Haworth*	1,508	52.0	
Conservative	Raja Talat Mahmood	567	19.6	
Reform UK & Bolton for Change	Jennifer Mary Armstrong	520	17.9	
Reform UK & Bolton for Change	Sharon Whitworth	487	16.8	
Conservative	Robert Tyler	347	12.0	
Reform UK & Bolton for Change	Kirsty Lawlor	341	11.8	
Conservative	Bethany Hood	272	9.4	
Green	Philip Kochitty	241	8.3	
Liberal Democrats	Wendy Connor	133	4.6	
Liberal Democrats	David Arthur Connor	114	3.9	
Liberal Democrats	Colin Stewart Hunter	72	2.5	
Turnout		2,900	29.20	
Registered electors		9,912		
Labour win (new seat)				
Labour win (new seat)				
Labour win (new seat)				

=== Farnworth South ===
Farnworth South (3)
Party	Candidate	Votes	%	±%
Farnworth and Kearsley First	Maureen Ann Flitcroft	1,184	49.4	
Farnworth and Kearsley First	Paul David Sanders*	1,173	49.0	
Labour	Champak Mistry*	900	37.6	
Labour	Jackie Schofield	877	36.6	
Labour	Waj Khan	846	35.3	
Reform UK & Bolton for Change	Jeff Armstrong	381	15.9	
Conservative	Natalie Yates	171	7.1	
Liberal Democrats	Jean Gillies	137	5.7	
Conservative	Kubbar Alom	114	4.8	
Conservative	Zahra Davda	105	4.4	
Liberal Democrats	Christine Joyce Macpherson	67	2.8	
Liberal Democrats	Richard Maurice Cooper	65	2.7	
Turnout		2,395	25.1	
Registered electors		9,536		
Farnworth and Kearsley First win (new seat)				
Farnworth and Kearsley First win (new seat)				
Labour win (new seat)				

=== Great Lever ===
Great Lever (3)
Party	Candidate	Votes	%	±%
Labour	Mohammed Ayub*	2,410	58.1	
Labour	Mohammed Iqbal*	2,288	55.1	
Labour	Karen Frances Hon	2,048	49.3	
Conservative	Malik Muzafar Nazar	1,580	38.1	
Conservative	Susan Owen	970	23.4	
Conservative	Sajidkhan Pathan	950	22.9	
Green	Mahboob Alom	280	6.7	
Reform UK & Bolton for Change	Taylor Jones	170	4.1	
Reform UK & Bolton for Change	Philip James Worthington	161	3.9	
Liberal Democrats	Michael John Farrell	118	2.8	
Liberal Democrats	Duncan Learmonth	101	2.4	
Liberal Democrats	Duncan Alexander Macpherson	84	2.0	
Turnout		4,150	36.5	
Registered electors		11,377		
Labour win (new boundaries)				
Labour win (new boundaries)				
Labour win (new boundaries)				

=== Halliwell ===
Halliwell (3)
Party	Candidate	Votes	%	±%
Labour	Rabiya Jiva*	2,080	49.3	
Labour	Safwaan Patel	1,983	47.0	
Labour	Kevin Morris	1,911	45.3	
Conservative	Mohamed Haji	1,834	43.5	
Conservative	Siraj Suleman Patel	1,715	40.6	
Conservative	Faruk Ugharadar	1,683	39.9	
Reform UK & Bolton for Change	Norman Cryer	216	5.1	
Reform UK & Bolton for Change	Gareth James Fitzsimmons	185	4.4	
Green	Martin McLoughlin	171	4.1	
Reform UK & Bolton for Change	Dave Nightingale	168	4.0	
Liberal Democrats	Francine Godfrey	150	3.6	
Liberal Democrats	Gordon Stone	102	2.4	
Liberal Democrats	Kenneth Kay	99	2.3	
Turnout		4,219	40.85	
Registered electors		10,329		
Labour win (new boundaries)				
Labour win (new boundaries)				
Labour win (new boundaries)				

=== Heaton Lostock and Chew Moor ===
Heaton, Lostock and Chew Moor (3)
Party	Candidate	Votes	%	±%
Conservative	Martyn Andrew Cox*	2,112	46.8	
Conservative	Anne Galloway*	2,054	45.5	
Conservative	Andy Morgan*	2,010	44.5	
Labour	Lyn Fisher	1,184	26.2	
Labour	John William Gillatt	1,169	25.9	
Labour	Janahan Kandiah Kugathas	1,095	24.3	
The Independent Choice	Gordon Campbell	684	15.1	
The Independent Choice	Steven John Chadwick	541	12.0	
The Independent Choice	Stephen Michael Rock	396	8.8	
Liberal Democrats	Rebekah Susan Mary Fairhurst	299	6.6	
Liberal Democrats	Jim Priest	288	6.4	
Liberal Democrats	Paul Martin	285	6.3	
Reform UK & Bolton for Change	Graham McGreavy	278	6.2	
Independent	Abraham Halliwell (PRF,)	30	0.7	
Turnout		4,515	40.35	
Registered electors		11,189		
Conservative win (new seat)				
Conservative win (new seat)				
Conservative win (new seat)				

=== Horwich North ===
Horwich North (3)
Party	Candidate	Votes	%	±%
Horwich and Blackrod First	Ryan Bamforth	1,910	47.4	
Horwich and Blackrod First	Craig Rotheram	1,709	42.4	
Horwich and Blackrod First	Victoria Elise Rigby	1,494	37.0	
Labour	Kevin McKeon*	1,467	36.4	
Labour	Mike Jarvis	1,392	34.5	
Labour	Samantha Watkin	1,193	29.6	
Conservative	Michael Baines	625	15.5	
Conservative	Matthew Kyle	435	10.8	
Conservative	Richard Elliott	427	10.6	
Green	Rod Riesco	238	5.9	
Liberal Democrats	Matt Turner-Allen	214	5.3	
Reform UK & Bolton for Change	Eddie Carr	158	3.9	
Liberal Democrats	Geoffrey Alan Fairhurst	116	2.9	
Liberal Democrats	Caroline Turner-Preece	90	2.2	
Turnout		4,033	36.4	
Registered electors		11,093		
Horwich and Blackrod First win (new seat)				
Horwich and Blackrod First win (new seat)				
Horwich and Blackrod First win (new seat)				

=== Horwich South and Blackrod ===
Horwich South and Blackrod (3)
Party	Candidate	Votes	%	±%
Horwich and Blackrod First	David Grant*	1,481	46.1	
Horwich and Blackrod First	Peter Wright*	1,316	40.9	
Horwich and Blackrod First	Samantha Williamson	1,272	39.6	
Labour	Fazeelah Khan	766	23.8	
Conservative	Susan Baines*	752	23.4	
Labour	Nadir Mohammad	747	23.2	
Labour	George Butler	674	21.0	
Conservative	Paul Norris	542	16.9	
Conservative	Hannah Wright	499	15.5	
Green	Helen Alker	206	6.4	
Reform UK & Bolton for Change	Loren Richards	113	3.5	
Liberal Democrats	Sylvia Fairhurst	93	2.9	
Liberal Democrats	Ollie Younge	93	2.9	
Liberal Democrats	Scott Turner-Preece	55	1.7	
Turnout		3,215	33.2	
Registered electors		9.685		
Horwich and Blackrod First win (new seat)				
Horwich and Blackrod First win (new seat)				
Horwich and Blackrod First win (new seat)				

=== Hulton ===
Hulton (3)
Party	Candidate	Votes	%	±%
Labour	Shafaqat Shaikh	1,431	40.5	
Labour	Aalaina Khan	1,412	39.9	
Conservative	Derek Bullock*	1,400	39.6	
Conservative	Toby Hewitt*	1,395	39.5	
Labour	Logan Pratheepan	1,346	38.1	
Conservative	Shafi Patel*	1,331	37.7	
Green	Wendy Ann Shepherd	362	10.2	
Reform UK & Bolton for Change	Rachel Armstrong	298	5.6	
Reform UK & Bolton for Change	Rob Lowe	262	7.4	
Liberal Democrats	Derek Gradwell	182	5.1	
Liberal Democrats	Linda Christine Maher	163	4.6	
Liberal Democrats	Ryan Michael Hough	147	4.2	
Turnout		3,535	32.8	
Registered electors		10,528		
Labour win (new boundaries)				
Labour win (new boundaries)				
Conservative win (new boundaries)				

=== Kearsley ===
Kearsley (3)
Party	Candidate	Votes	%	±%
One Kearsley	Debbie Newall*	1,350	55.9	
One Kearsley	Paul Heslop*	1,343	55.6	
One Kearsley	Melanie Livesey	1,121	46.4	
Farnworth and Kearsley First	Tracey Louise Wilkinson*	686	28.4	
Labour	Sophie Hallworth	411	17.0	
Labour	Eddie Gorman	385	15.9	
Labour	Musa Amedu	357	14.8	
Conservative	Mark Cunningham	270	11.2	
Conservative	Glenys Ratcliffe	221	9.1	
Reform UK & Bolton for Change	Julie Pattison	180	7.5	
Conservative	Lewis Croden	127	5.3	
Liberal Democrats	Charles Cooper	28	1.2	
Liberal Democrats	Christine Anne Strawbridge	26	1.1	
Liberal Democrats	John William Strawbridge	14	0.6	
Turnout		2,414	26.3	
Registered electors		9,192		
One Kearsley win (new boundaries)				
One Kearsley win (new boundaries)				
One Kearsley win (new boundaries)				

=== Little Lever and Darcy Lever ===
Little Lever and Darcy Lever (3)
Party	Candidate	Votes	%	±%
Conservative	Andrea Taylor-Burke*	1,213	40.4	
Conservative	David Meehan*	986	32.8	
Labour	Liam Barnard	964	32.1	
Conservative	Fred Khan	801	26.7	
Labour	Jo Fisk	785	26.1	
Labour	Bob Sproat	732	24.4	
Little Lever & Darcy Lever First	Sean Colin Hornby*	664	22.1	
Little Lever & Darcy Lever First	Rees Gibbon	582	19.4	
Reform UK & Bolton for Change	Kathryn Andrea Harris	472	15.7	
Reform UK & Bolton for Change	Simon Johnson	333	11.1	
Reform UK & Bolton for Change	Brett Varnam	313	10.4	
Liberal Democrats	Susie Martin	113	3.8	
Liberal Democrats	Naila Asghar	85	2.8	
Liberal Democrats	Michael Robert Wilkinson	69	2.3	
Turnout		3,002	31.3	
Registered electors		9,591		
Conservative win (new boundaries)				
Conservative win (new boundaries)				
Labour win (new boundaries)				

=== Queens Park and Central ===
Queens Park and Central (3)
Party	Candidate	Votes	%	±%
Labour	Akhtar Zaman*	1,672	67.0	
Labour Co-op	Richard Silvester*	1,625	65.1	
Labour	Linda Carol Thomas*	1,561	62.6	
Conservative	Hetan Ajwani	354	14.2	
Conservative	Hafiz Tahir Butt	347	13.9	
Conservative	Shahjahan Shah	284	11.4	
Reform UK & Bolton for Change	Tracey Ann Earp	217	8.7	
Reform UK & Bolton for Change	Sandra Harvey	189	7.6	
Liberal Democrats	Stewart Malcolm Ball	163	6.5	
Liberal Democrats	Michael Justin Kay Isherwood	147	5.9	
Liberal Democrats	Andrew John Tonge	116	4.6	
Northern Heart	Anthony Massey	101	4.0	
Rejected ballots		11		
Turnout		2,495	24.5	
Registered electors		9,818		
Labour win (new seat)				
Labour win (new seat)				
Labour win (new seat)				

=== Rumworth ===
Rumworth (3)
Party	Candidate	Votes	%	±%
Labour	Abdul Aziz Atcha*	2,491	50.0	
Labour	Sajid Ali	2,484	49.8	
Labour	Amjid Khan	2,238	44.9	
Conservative	Ayyub Patel Chota	2,019	40.5	
Conservative	Yusuf Davda	1,975	39.6	
Conservative	Rosy Abdullah	1,829	36.7	
Green	Alan Johnson	374	7.5	
Green	Glenys Ann Johnson	296	5.9	
Reform UK & Bolton for Change	Colin Speakman	163	3.3	
Liberal Democrats	Jaleh Hayes	99	2.0	
Rejected ballots		24		
Turnout		4,983	43.6	
Registered electors		11,436		
Labour win (new boundaries)				
Labour win (new boundaries)				
Labour win (new boundaries)				

=== Smithills ===
Smithills (3)
Party	Candidate	Votes	%	±%
Liberal Democrats	Roger Geoffrey Cliffe Hayes*	1,944	53.4	
Liberal Democrats	Sue Priest*	1,867	51.2	
Liberal Democrats	Garry Neil Veevers*	1,687	46.3	
Labour	Noelene Gillatt	922	25.3	
Labour	Sorie Sesay	871	23.9	
Labour	Zeeshan Akhtar	828	22.7	
Conservative	Carol Forshaw	473	13.0	
Conservative	Cathryn Norris	393	10.8	
Conservative	Douglas Taylor	359	9.9	
Green	Vicki Attenborough	286	7.9	
Reform UK & Bolton for Change	Helen Shaw	203	5.6	
Reform UK & Bolton for Change	Stephen Tonge	171	4.7	
Rejected ballots		10		
Turnout		3,643	34.7	
Registered electors		10,503		
Liberal Democrats win (new boundaries)				
Liberal Democrats win (new boundaries)				
Liberal Democrats win (new boundaries)				

=== Tonge with the Haulgh ===
Tonge with the Haulgh (3)
Party	Candidate	Votes	%	±%
Labour Co-op	Martin Donaghy*	1,518	52.8	
Labour Co-op	Nick Peel*	1,446	50.3	
Labour Co-op	Emily Grace Amelia Mort*	1,401	48.8	
Conservative	Selena Bain	773	26.9	
Conservative	Ciaran Tully	727	25.3	
Conservative	Jodie Louise Lane	726	25.3	
Reform UK & Bolton for Change	Trevor Jones	527	18.3	
Liberal Democrats	Rebecca Ann Forrest	194	6.8	
Liberal Democrats	Rosalind Harasiwka	159	5.5	
Liberal Democrats	Franko Harasiwka	155	5.4	
Northern Heart	Alexander John Mell McAllister	117	4.1	
Rejected ballots		8		
Turnout		2,873	25.1	
Registered electors		11,238		
Labour Co-op win (new boundaries)				
Labour Co-op win (new boundaries)				
Labour Co-op win (new boundaries)				

=== Westhoughton North and Hunger Hill ===
Westhoughton North and Hunger Hill (3)
Party	Candidate	Votes	%	±%
Liberal Democrats	Arthur Price	1,135	34.3	
Conservative	Martin Tighe	1,111	33.5	
Conservative	Bernadette Eckersley-Fallon*	1,065	32.2	
Conservative	Andrea Finney*	1,064	32.1	
Liberal Democrats	Alison Jean Jackson	1,049	31.7	
Liberal Democrats	Gillian Elizabeth Wroe	981	29.6	
Labour	Amanda Jayne Armstrong	759	22.9	
Labour	Zoe Walsh	716	21.6	
Labour	Mareike Steiner	644	19.4	
Westhoughton First Independents	Jack Speight	393	11.9	
Reform UK & Bolton for Change	Steven Haslam	192	5.8	
Green	Heather Rylance	173	5.2	
Rejected ballots		12		
Turnout		3,312	32.4	
Registered electors		10,209		
Liberal Democrats win (new seat)				
Conservative win (new seat)				
Conservative win (new seat)				

=== Westhoughton South ===
Westhoughton South (3)
Party	Candidate	Votes	%	±%
Labour	David Andrew Chadwick	1,163	36.3	
Liberal Democrats	David Arthur Wilkinson*	1,141	35.6	
Liberal Democrats	Neil Maher	1,021	31.9	
Liberal Democrats	Deirdre Janice McGeown*	1,008	31.5	
Labour	John Stewart McHugh	995	31.0	
Labour	Karen Millington	970	30.3	
Conservative	Rachel Eckersley-Fallon	637	19.9	
Conservative	Carol Kirkman	627	19.6	
Conservative	Anna-Marie Watters	611	19.1	
Westhoughton First Independents	Sharon Ann Gough	349	10.9	
Reform UK & Bolton for Change	Matthew Kemp	231	7.2	
Reform UK & Bolton for Change	Sandy Holt	192	6.0	
Rejected ballots		31		
Turnout		3,205	31.1	
Registered electors		10,292		
Labour win (new boundaries)				
Liberal Democrats win (new boundaries)				
Liberal Democrats win (new boundaries)				

== By-elections ==
=== Kearsley ===
Kearsley: 16 November 2023
Party	Candidate	Votes	%	±%
Farnworth and Kearsley First	Tracey Wilkinson	1,081	66.0	+42.5
Labour	Jackie Schofield	365	22.3	+8.2
Bolton for Change	Dale Gregory	121	7.4	+1.2
Conservative	Malaika Dean	38	2.3	–6.9
Green	Alan Johnson	18	1.1	N/A
Liberal Democrats	Charles Cooper	15	0.9	–0.1
Majority		716	43.7	N/A
Turnout		1,640		
Farnworth and Kearsley First gain from One Kearsley		Swing	▲17.2	

A by-election was held on 16 November 2023 following the resignation of Paul Heslop on 2 October 2023.

=== Westhoughton North and Hunger Hill ===
Westhoughton North and Hunger Hill: 16 November 2023
Party	Candidate	Votes	%	±%
Liberal Democrats	Deirdre McGeown	959	41.5	+11.3
Conservative	Andrea Finney	665	28.8	–0.7
Labour	Karen Millington	440	19.0	–1.2
Westhoughton First Independents	Jack Speight	118	5.1	–5.3
Bolton for Change	Jeff Armstrong	101	4.4	–0.7
Green	Wendy Shepherd	28	1.2	–3.4
Majority		294	12.7	
Turnout		2,315		
Liberal Democrats gain from Conservative		Swing	▲6.0	

A by-election was held on 16 November 2023 following the resignation of Bernadette Eckersley-Fallon on 2 October 2023.
