= Horwich Town Council =

Local authority for Horwich, Greater Manchester, England

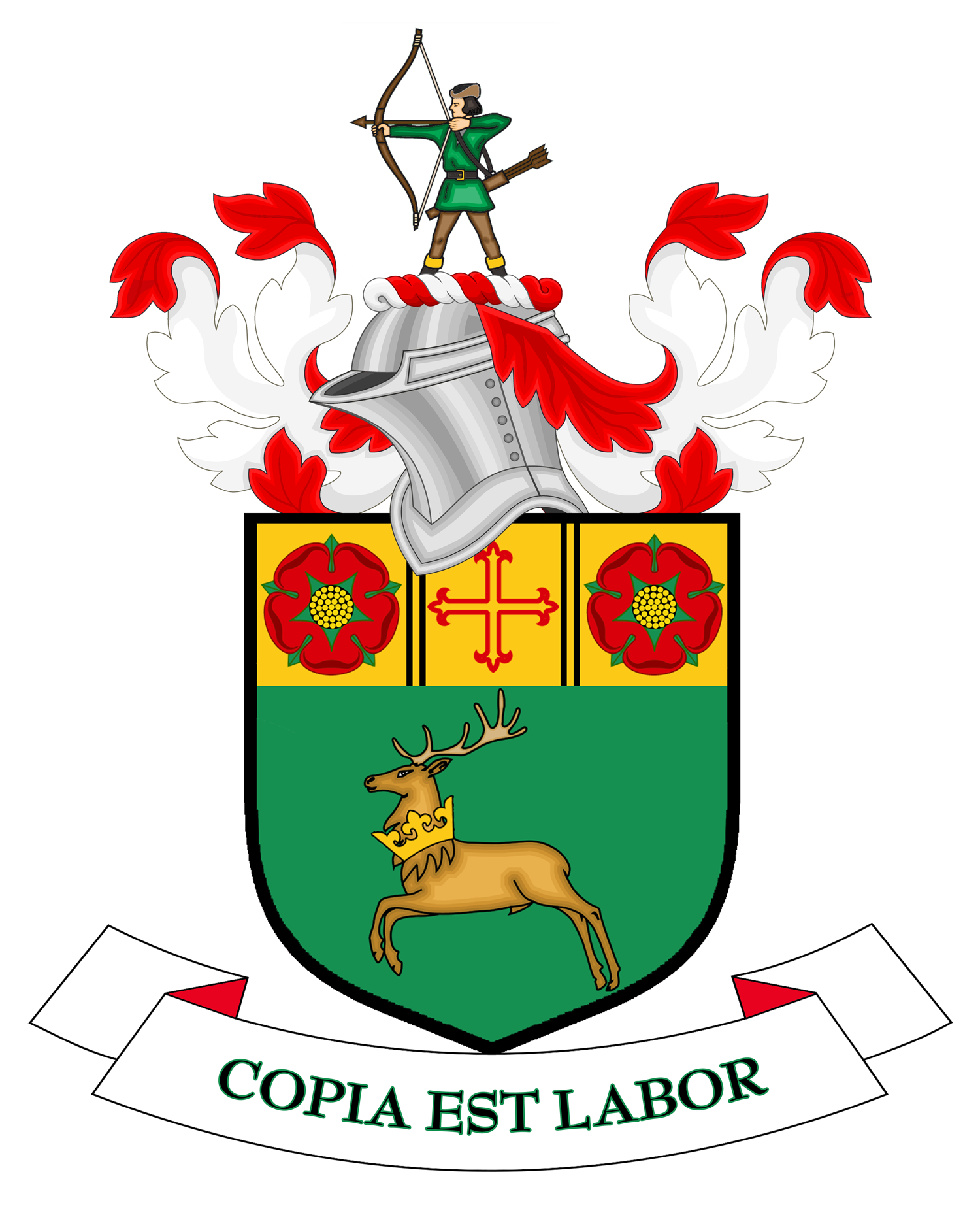

Type
- Type: Town Council of the Civil Parish of Horwich

Leadership
- Town Mayor: Kevin McKeon, Green Party
- Town Clerk: Chloe Morris, Non-political post

Structure
- Seats: 14 Town Councillors
- Political groups: Horwich and Blackrod First (12) Green (1) Independent (1)

Elections
- Voting system: First past the post

Meeting place
- The Public Hall, Lee Lane, Horwich

Website
- www.horwich.gov.uk

Horwich Town Council is a local authority with limited powers and covers the town and civil parish of Horwich in the Metropolitan Borough of Bolton, Greater Manchester, England. It is made up of fourteen elected Town Councillors, representing eight electoral Wards. Six of the Wards elect two Councillors while two other Wards elect one Councillor.

== History ==
Under the Local Government Act 1972, Horwich Urban District Council was abolished in 1974 and its area became a successor parish authority in the Metropolitan Borough of Bolton.

== Letters Patent granting arms to Horwich Town Council ==
The following is the full text of the letters patent issued by the College of Arms granting armorial bearings:

To All and Singular to whom these Presents shall come Sir Anthony Richard Wagner, Knight Commander of the Royal Victorian Order, Garter Principal King of Arms, John Riddell Bromhead Walker, Esquire, Member of the Royal Victorian Order, upon whom has been conferred the Decoration of the Military Cross, Clarenceux King of Arms and Walter John George Verco, Esquire, Commander of the Royal Victorian Order, Norroy and Ulster King of Arms send Greeting!

Whereas, Desmond Smith, Gentleman, Town Mayor of the Town of Horwich did represent unto The Most Noble Bernard Marmaduke, Duke of Norfolk, Knight of the Most Noble Order of the Garter, Knight Grand Cross of the Royal Victorian Order, Knight Grand Cross of the Most Excellent Order of the British Empire, upon whom has been conferred the Territorial Decoration, Earl Marshal and Hereditary Marshal of England and One of Her Majesty's Most Honourable Privy Council, now deceased, that pursuant to the provisions of the Local Government Act 1972, the Council of the Parish of Horwich was established as a successor Parish Authority to the then existing Urban District of Horwich and that in accordance with the said Act the Council of the Parish of Horwich adopted on the Ninth day of January 1974 the status of a Town and accordingly the Parish Council of Horwich is now the Town Council of Horwich. That the Town Council is desirous of having Armorial Bearing duly established with lawful authority and he therefore as Town Mayor of the Town of Horwich and on behalf of the Council thereof did request the favour of His Grace's Warrant for Our granting and assigning such Arms and Crest as We may consider fit and proper to be borne and used by the Town Council of Horwich on its Common Seal or otherwise according to the Laws of Arms. And forasmuch as the said Earl Marshal did by Warrant under his hand and Seal bearing date the Sixth day of December 1974 authorise and direct Us to grant and assign such Arms and Crest accordingly Know Ye therefore that We the said Garter, Clarenceux and Norroy and Ulster in pursuance of His Grace's Warrant and by virtue of the Letters Patent of Our several Offices to each of Us respectively granted do by these Presents grant and assign unto the Town Council of Horwich the Arms following that is to say:

Vert a Hart courant proper gorged with an Ancient Crown on a Chief or a Cross Flory Gules voided of the Chief between four Pallets two and two Sable all between two Roses Gules barbed and seeded proper. And for the Crest on a Wreath Argent and Gules a Huntsman habited and drawing his bow all proper.

== Powers and functions ==
Horwich Town Council acts as a channel of local opinion to Bolton Metropolitan Borough Council, and as such has the right to be informed on any planning decisions affecting the civil parish. The Town Council receives funding by levying a "precept" on the Council Tax paid by the residents of the civil parish. It has the powers to provide crime prevention measures (such as CCTV) and to contribute money towards traffic calming schemes. The Town Council also gives grants to local voluntary organisations, and sponsoring public events, including Horwich in Bloom, a local version of Britain in Bloom. Since 1997, the Town Council awards civic medals every two years to people of Horwich who provided exemplary service to the town.

== Wards and Councillors ==
Since 1974, Horwich is served by a Town Council, which is divided into eight Wards, each represented by one or two Town Councillors.

Current Town Council
Ward	Councillor	Party
Brazley Ward	Kevin McKeon	Green
Brazley Ward	Stephen Rock	Horwich and Blackrod First
Bridge Ward	Tracy Rotheram	Horwich and Blackrod First
Bridge Ward	Peter Wright	Horwich and Blackrod First
Central Ward	John Scoble	Horwich and Blackrod First
Church Ward	Victoria Rigby	Horwich and Blackrod First
Church Ward	Andrea Finney	Horwich and Blackrod First
Claypool Ward	Ian Aldcroft	Horwich and Blackrod First
Claypool Ward	Gordon Stone	Horwich and Blackrod First
Fall Birch Ward	Gordon Campbell	Horwich and Blackrod First
Lever Park Ward	Stewart Burke	Horwich and Blackrod First
Lever Park Ward	Steven Chadwick	Horwich and Blackrod First
Vale Ward	David Grant	Horwich and Blackrod First
Vale Ward	Charlotte Sears	Independent

== Mayors of Horwich ==
Each year the Town Council elects one of the Town Councillors to become the Town Mayor who represents the town over the Municipal year. It is a ceremonial position, and some of the holders have held the position more than once.

List of Mayors of Horwich
Tenure	Name	Party	Notes
1974–1975	Desmond Smith	Labour	
1975–1976	Walter Taylor	Labour	
1976–1977	Ron Parkinson	Conservative	
1977–1978	Michael Foster	Conservative	
1978–1979	Barrie Crumblehulme	Conservative	
1979–1980	Elizabeth McCracken	Labour	1st term.
1980–1981	Stanley Dawson	Conservative	
1981–1982	Thomas Fairhurst	Labour	
1982–1983	Elsie Butterworth	Conservative	
1983–1984	Ernest Seddon	Labour	
1984–1985	John Kevin Kilcoyne	Labour	
1985–1986	Bernard P. Broderick	Conservative	
1986–1987	Albert Swindells	Labour	
1987–1988	Kevan James Helsby	Labour	1st term. Also Mayor of Bolton 2001–2002.
1988–1989	Elizabeth McCracken	Labour	2nd term.
1989–1990	Ian Badon Hamilton	Liberal Democrats	
1990–1991	Alice Kilcoyne	Labour	1st term.
1991–1992	Robert Ronson	Liberal Democrats	1st term.
1992–1992	Ian Carruthers	Labour	
1992–1993	Elizabeth McCracken	Labour	3rd term.
1993–1994	Mark Perks	Conservative	
1994–1995	Madeline Murray	Labour	
1995–1996	John Bragg	Labour	1st term.
1996–1997	Barbara Olwyn Ronson	Liberal Democrats	Also Mayor of Bolton 2007–2008.
1997–1998	Elizabeth McCracken	Labour	4th term.
1998–1999	Alice Kilcoyne	Labour	2nd term.
1999–2000	James Michael Kilcoyne	Labour	
2000–2001	Peter McGeehan	Liberal Democrats	
2001–2002	Joyce Kellett	Labour	1st term.
2002–2003	John Bragg	Labour	2nd term.
2003–2004	Robert Ronson	Liberal Democrats	2nd term.
2004–2005	Kevan James Helsby	Labour	2nd term. Also Mayor of Bolton 2001–2002.
2005–2006	Stephen Michael Rock	Liberal Democrats	1st term.
2006–2007	Bernard McCartin	Liberal Democrats	
2007–2008	Kenneth Malcolm Denton	Liberal Democrats	1st term.
2008–2009	Thomas Farmer	Liberal Democrats	
2009–2010	Susan Denton	Liberal Democrats	1st term.
2010–2011	Kenneth Thompson	Liberal Democrats	
2011–2012	Peter Baxendale	Conservative	
2012–2013	Joyce Kellett	Labour	2nd term.
2013–2014	Christine A. Root	Labour	
2014–2015	Richard E. W. Silvester	Labour Co-op	
2015–2016	Kenneth Malcolm Denton	Labour	2nd term.
2016–2017	James Bullock	Labour	
2017–2018	Stephen Michael Rock	Liberal Democrats	2nd term.
2018–2019	Peter Wright	Labour	
2019–2021	Gordon Stone	Liberal Democrats	While originally only elected for one term, due to the COVID-19 pandemic, it was decided that the Town Mayor would continue in office for a 2nd term.
2021–2022	Susan Denton	Horwich and Blackrod First	2nd term.
2022–2023	Steven Chadwick	Horwich and Blackrod First	
2023–2024	David Grant	Horwich and Blackrod First	
2024–2025	Ian Aldcroft	Horwich and Blackrod First	
2025–2026	Victoria Rigby	Horwich and Blackrod First	
2026–2027	Kevin McKeon	Green	

== Twin town ==
Horwich is twinned with the town of Crowborough in East Sussex. They entered into a unique twinning arrangement when they became the first towns within the United Kingdom to sign a Town Twinning Charter. The charter was signed by the Mayors of Horwich and Crowborough at a ceremony in the Public Hall, Horwich on the 22 March 1990 and in the Town Hall, Crowborough on the 27 March 1990. On the 25th anniversary of the Town Twinning, in March 2015, the Mayor of Horwich, Cllr. Richard E. W. Silvester and the Mayor of Crowborough, Cllr. Ronald G. Reed signed 25th Anniversary celebratory Town Twinning documents in Crowborough Town Hall on Tuesday 10 March 2015 and in Horwich Public Hall on Thursday 19 March 2015, to re-new the twinning agreement. Horwich Cycle Club members travelled down to Crowborough on Friday 15 May 2015 and cycled with members of Wealden Cycle Club over that weekend as part of the celebrations.
