= Blackrod Town Council =

Local authority of Blackrod, Greater Manchester, England

Type
- Type: Town Council of the Civil Parish of Blackrod

Leadership
- Town Mayor: Richard Harrison (Horwich & Blackrod First Independents)
- Town Clerk: Lara Nuttall (non-political post)

Structure
- Seats: 9 Town Councillors
- Political groups: Horwich and Blackrod First (8) Independents (1)

Elections
- Voting system: First past the post

Website
- blackrodtowncouncil.gov.uk

Blackrod Town Council is a local authority with limited powers and covers the town and civil parish of Blackrod in the Metropolitan Borough of Bolton, Greater Manchester, England. It is made up of nine Town Councillors representing three electoral Wards.

== Precursor ==
Blackrod was once a township in the civil parish of Bolton le Moors in the historic County of Lancashire, England.

Under provisions of the Poor Relief Act 1662, townships replaced civil parishes as the main units of local administration in Lancashire. Blackrod became one of the eighteen autonomous townships of the civil parish of Bolton le Moors. The township appointed overseers of the poor who levied a rate to fund the Poor Law. Highway surveyors were also appointed and funded from the rate to maintain the roads. In 1866, Blackrod's status was elevated from a township to a civil parish.

A resolution for the adoption of the Local Government Act 1858 was passed on 9 May 1872 by the owners and ratepayers of the civil parish of Blackrod, and resulted a local board was created to provide for the water supply and drainage of the town. After the Public Health Act 1875 was passed by Parliament in that year, Blackrod Local Board assumed extra duties as an urban sanitary district, although the Local Board's title did not change.

Following the implementation of the Local Government Act 1894, Blackrod Local Board was transformed into an elected urban district Council of nine members. Blackrod Urban District Council had three electoral wards: Central, North, and South, each represented by three Councillors.

Under the Local Government Act 1972, Blackrod Urban District was abolished on 1 April 1974 and its former area became a successor parish in the Metropolitan Borough of Bolton in Greater Manchester.

== Wards and Councillors ==
Since 1974, Blackrod is served by a Town Council, which is divided into three Wards, each represented by three Town Councillors.

== Mayors of Blackrod ==
Each year the Town Council elects one of the Town Councillors to become the Town Mayor who represents the town over the Municipal year. It is a ceremonial position, and some of the holders have held the position more than once.

- 1974–1974: George Arthur Gardiner (Lab)
- 1974–1975: James Kenneth Vickers (Lab)
- 1975–1976: Graham Farrington (Ind) (1st term)
- 1976–1977: Reginald Winstanley (Con)
- 1977–1978: Constance Mary Everin (Con) (1st term)
- 1978–1979: Robert Ratcliffe (Lab) (1st term)
- 1979–1980: Joseph Jolley (Con)
- 1980–1981: John Raymond Birchall Barrow (Con) (1st term)
- 1981–1982: Graham Farrington (Ind) (2nd term)
- 1982–1983: Constance Mary Everin (Con) (2nd term)
- 1983–1984: Robert Ratcliffe (Lab) (2nd term)
- 1984–1985: Josephine Ida Johnson (Lab) (1st term)
- 1985–1986: Lancelot Watkinson (Lab)
- 1986–1987: John Raymond Birchall Barrow (Con) (2nd term)
- 1987–1988: Graham Farrington (Ind) (3rd term)
- 1988–1989: Eric Johnson (Lab) (1st term)
- 1989–1990: Frank Woods (Con)
- 1990–1991: Robert Ratcliffe (Lab) (3rd term)
- 1991–1992: Lucy Patricia Barrow (Con) (1st term)
- 1992–1993: John Monaghan (Lab) (1st term)
- 1993–1994: Eric Johnson (Lab) (2nd term)
- 1994–1995: Josephine Ida Johnson (Lab) (2nd term)
- 1995–1996: Adrian Roy Mather (Ind)
- 1996–1997: Lucy Patricia Barrow (Con) (2nd term)
- 1997–1998: John Monaghan (Lab) (2nd term)
- 1998–1999: Beryl Monaghan (Lab) (1st term)
- 1999–2000: Marlene Winward (Con) (1st term)
- 2000–2001: Beryl Monaghan (Lab) (2nd term)
- 2001–2002: Lucy Patricia Barrow (Con) (3rd term)
- 2002–2003: John William Seddon (Lab)
- 2003–2004: Michael Hollick (Con) (1st term)
- 2004–2005: Beryl Monaghan (Lab) (3rd term)
- 2005–2006: Keith John Edward Bowes (Lab)
- 2006–2007: Isabel Alice Seddon (Lab) (1st term)
- 2007–2008: Ian Badon Hamilton (Lib Dem)
- 2008–2009: Marlene Winward (Con) (2nd term)
- 2009–2010: Andrew Bower (Con)
- 2010–2011: Isabel Alice Seddon (Lab) (2nd term)
- 2011–2012: Pat Senior (Con)
- 2012–2013: Lucy Patricia Barrow (Con) (4th term)
- 2013–2014: Stephen Laycock (Ind)
- 2014–2015: Beryl Monaghan (Lab) (4th term)
- 2015–2016: Michael Hollick (Con) (2nd term)
- 2016–2017: Ann Cunliffe (Lab)
- 2017–2018: Isabel Alice Seddon (Lab) (3rd term)
- 2018–2019: Scott Batchelor (Ind)
- 2019–2020: John Price (Ind) (1st term)
- 2020–2021: John Price (Ind) (2nd term because of the Covid 19 pandemic)
- 2021–2022: Nick Bell (Ind)
- 2022–2023: Susan Baines (Con)
- 2023–2024: John Price (Ind) (3rd term)
- 2024–2025: Derek Snowden (Horwich & Blackrod First Independents)
- 2025–2026: Dr Kathryn Grant (Horwich & Blackrod First Independents)
- 2026–2027: Richard Harrison (Horwich & Blackrod First Independents)
