= 2018 Bolton Metropolitan Borough Council election =

2018 UK local government election

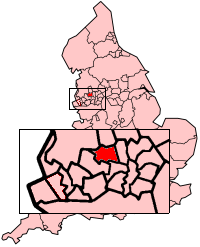
The Metropolitan Borough of Bolton shown within England.

Map showing the results of the 2018 Bolton Metropolitan Borough Council election.

The 2018 Bolton Metropolitan Borough Council election took place on 3 May 2018 to elect members of Bolton Council in Greater Manchester, England. This was on the same day as other local elections. The Labour Party retained overall control of the Council with a majority of 1.

21 seats were contested and the Conservative Party won 9 seats, the Labour Party won 8 seats, the Liberal Democrats won 2 seats, and Farnworth and Kearsley First won 2 seats.

After the election, the total composition of the council was as follows:

- Labour 31
- Conservative 19
- UK Independence Party 3
- Liberal Democrats 4
- Farnworth and Kearsley First 3

== Election results ==
2018 Bolton Metropolitan Borough Council election results
Party	Candidates						Votes		
Party	Stood	Elected	Gained	Unseated	Net	% of total	%	No.	Net %
Labour	21	8	1	5	▼4	38.0	38.5	29,467	▼2.3
Conservative	21	9	2	0	▲2	42.8	34.0	26,084	▲8.4
Liberal Democrats	21	2	1	0	▲1	4.7	13.8	10,583	▲2.7
Farnworth and Kearsley First	3	2	2	0	▲2	9.5	5.8	4,460	N/A
UKIP	7	0	0	1	▼1	0.0	2.9	2,263	▼16.4
Green	13	0	0	0	Steady	0.0	2.7	2,072	▼0.3
Independent	7	0	0	0	Steady	0.0	2.0	1,599	▲1.7
Totals	93	21				100.0	100.0	76,528	▲3,956

== Council Composition ==
Prior to the election the composition of the council was:

↓
35	17	3	4	1
Labour	Conservative	LD	U	FK

After the election the composition of the council was:

↓
31	19	4	3	3
Labour	Conservative	LD	U	FK

LD - Liberal Democrats
U - UKIP
FK - Farnworth and Kearsley First

== Ward results ==
=== Astley Bridge ward ===
Astley Bridge ward
Party	Candidate	Votes	%	±%
Conservative	John Walsh	1,842	42.5	+0.0
Liberal Democrats	Warren Fox	1,564	36.1	+15.6
Labour	Zulfi Jiva	930	21.4	−3.7
Majority		278	6.4	−11.1
Turnout		4,336	42.0	−2.0
Conservative hold		Swing	UKIP to Lib Dem 12.7	

=== Bradshaw ward ===
Bradshaw ward
Party	Candidate	Votes	%	±%
Conservative	Mudasir Dean	1,949	57.1	+6.5
Labour	Tony Shepherd	880	25.8	+1.0
Independent	Eric Hyland	278	8.1	+2.7
Liberal Democrats	Stephen Howarth	173	5.1	+2.4
Green	Laura Diggle	135	3.9	+1.5
Majority		1,069	31.3	+5.5
Turnout		3,415	38.1	−4.8
Conservative hold		Swing	UKIP to Conservative 10.3	

=== Breightmet ward ===
Breightmet ward
Party	Candidate	Votes	%	±%
Conservative	Adele Warren	1,549	47.4	+21.5
Labour	Francesca Platt	1,278	39.1	+3.3
UKIP	Harry Lamb	242	7.4	−25.5
Green	Dan Bolton	138	4.2	+1.6
Liberal Democrats	Richard Bates	61	1.9	−0.8
Majority		271	8.3	
Turnout		3,268	34.4	−2.6
Conservative gain from Labour		Swing	UKIP to Conservative 23.5	

=== Bromley Cross ward ===
Bromley Cross ward (2 seats)
Party	Candidate	Votes	%	±%
Conservative	David Greenhalgh	2,928	73.3	
Conservative	Nadim Muslim	2,257	56.5	
Labour	Steve Sutton	1,023	25.6	
Labour	Deb Whenlock	910	22.8	
Green	Liz Spencer	374	9.4	
Liberal Democrats	Elliott Bermudez-Galton	303	7.6	
Liberal Democrats	David Walsh	196	4.9	
Majority		(Greenhalgh) 1,905		
Majority		(Muslim) 1,234		
Turnout		3,996	38.4	
Conservative hold				
Conservative hold				

=== Crompton ward ===
Crompton ward
Party	Candidate	Votes	%	±%
Labour	Bilkis Ismail	2,258	57.1	−10.4
Conservative	Daniel Wheatley	737	18.6	+9.2
Independent	Siraj Patel	706	17.8	+17.8
Liberal Democrats	Michael Langdon	252	6.4	+2.7
Majority		1,521	38.5	−9.5
Turnout		3,953	36.8	+0.9
Labour hold		Swing	UKIP to Ind 18.6	

=== Farnworth ward ===
Farnworth ward
Party	Candidate	Votes	%	±%
Farnworth and Kearsley First	Maureen Flitcroft	1,699	53.9	+53.9
Labour	Martin McMulkin	1,172	37.3	−11.1
Conservative	Jennifer Kirk	142	4.5	−4.1
UKIP	Dave Harvey	92	2.9	−33.5
Liberal Democrats	David Cooper	44	1.4	−1.6
Majority		522	16.5	
Turnout		3,154	30.0	
Farnworth and Kearsley First gain from Labour		Swing	UKIP to FKF 43.7	

=== Great Lever ward ===
Great Lever ward
Party	Candidate	Votes	%	±%
Labour	Mohammed Ayub	2,422	76.0	+6.5
Conservative	Mohammed Waqas	389	12.2	+4.6
Green	David Figgins	232	7.3	+1.2
Liberal Democrats	Francine Godfrey	143	4.5	+0.6
Majority		2,033	63.8	+7.2
Turnout		3,186	32.9	−1.4
Labour hold		Swing	UKIP to Labour 9.7	

=== Halliwell ward ===
Halliwell ward
Party	Candidate	Votes	%	±%
Labour	Akhtar Zaman	2,181	70.2	+3.6
Conservative	Jolyon Coombs	418	13.6	+5.1
Liberal Democrats	John Falch	120	3.8	−0.2
Green	Ian McHugh	118	3.8	−0.7
Independent	Martin McLoughlin	114	3.7	+3.7
Independent	Sarfraz Nawaz	83	2.7	+2.7
Independent	Anthony Massey	71	2.3	+2.3
Majority		1,767	56.8	+6.6
Turnout		3,110	35.2	−0.3
Labour hold		Swing	UKIP to Conservative 10.7	

=== Harper Green ward ===
Harper Green ward
Party	Candidate	Votes	%	±%
Labour	Hamid Khurram	1,910	53.3	+3.8
Farnworth and Kearsley First	Lisa Weatherby	897	25.1	+25.1
Conservative	Robert Tyler	477	13.4	+1.7
UKIP	Amy Wunderley	157	4.4	−27.9
Green	Matthew Barnes	63	1.8	−1.7
Liberal Democrats	Kevin Walsh	62	1.7	−1.4
Majority		1,013	28.4	+11.2
Turnout		3,566	36.1	+4.3
Labour hold		Swing	UKIP to FKF 26.5	

=== Heaton and Lostock ward ===
Heaton and Lostock ward
Party	Candidate	Votes	%	±%
Conservative	Anne Galloway	3,000	66.4	+10.2
Labour	John Gillatt	1,247	27.6	+0.6
Liberal Democrats	Garry Veevers	269	5.9	+0.4
Majority		1,753	38.8	+9.5
Turnout		4,516	42.3	−3.6
Conservative hold		Swing	UKIP to Conservative 9.3	

=== Horwich and Blackrod ward ===
Horwich and Blackrod ward
Party	Candidate	Votes	%	±%
Conservative	Susan Baines	1,668	47.6	+18.0
Labour	Michael Jarvis	1,437	41.0	−1.5
Liberal Democrats	Rebecca Forrest	231	6.6	+3.1
Green	Keith Cocker	169	4.8	−0.6
Majority		231	6.6	
Turnout		3,505	33.7	−2.0
Conservative gain from Labour		Swing	UKIP to Conservative 18.5	

=== Horwich North East ward ===
Horwich North East ward
Party	Candidate	Votes	%	±%
Labour	Kevin McKeon	1,345	36.0	−4.9
Liberal Democrats	Stephen Rock	1,288	34.5	+14.3
Conservative	Joan Johnson	887	23.8	+3.5
Green	Rod Riesco	213	5.7	+0.8
Majority		57	1.5	−19.1
Turnout		3,733	38.0	−2.7
Labour hold		Swing	UKIP to Lib Dem 14.0	

=== Hulton ward ===
Hulton ward
Party	Candidate	Votes	%	±%
Conservative	Diane Parkinson	1,858	50.2	+17.5
Labour	Rabiya Jiva	1,451	39.2	+2.2
UKIP	Beverley Fletcher	215	5.8	−18.7
Green	Chris Taylor	107	2.9	−0.4
Liberal Democrats	Kevin Mulligan	68	1.8	−0.7
Majority		407	11.0	
Turnout		3,699	37.0	−1.4
Conservative hold		Swing	UKIP to Conservative 18.1	

=== Kearsley ward ===
Kearsley ward
Party	Candidate	Votes	%	±%
Farnworth and Kearsley First	Julie Pattison	1,864	52.3	+52.3
Labour	Stephen Langley	882	24.7	−13.5
UKIP	Will Pilkington	399	11.2	−34.0
Conservative	Kamaran Fathulla	290	8.1	−1.1
Liberal Democrats	Connor Goodwin	131	3.7	−3.7
Majority		982	27.5	
Turnout		3,566	34.1	+2.3
Farnworth and Kearsley First gain from Labour		Swing	UKIP to FKF 43.1	

=== Little Lever and Darcy Lever ward ===
Little Lever and Darcy Lever ward
Party	Candidate	Votes	%	±%
Labour	David Evans	1,249	37.5	+10.1
Conservative	David Meehan	1,000	30.0	+19.3
UKIP	Paul Richardson	926	27.8	−11.5
Liberal Democrats	Christine MacPherson	159	4.8	−15.5
Majority		249	7.5	
Turnout		3,334	34.7	−7.5
Labour gain from UKIP		Swing	Lib Dem to Conservative 17.4	

=== Rumworth ward ===
Rumworth ward
Party	Candidate	Votes	%	±%
Labour	Ismail Ibrahim	2,570	75.7	+3.5
Conservative	Hafiz Butt	379	11.2	+0.7
Green	Alan Johnson	251	7.4	+2.4
Independent	Damien Walsh	111	3.3	+3.3
Liberal Democrats	Duncan MacPherson	55	2.5	+0.2
Majority		2,191	64.5	+2.8
Turnout		3,396	34.4	−2.6
Labour hold		Swing	UKIP to Labour 6.7	

=== Smithills ward ===
Smithills ward
Party	Candidate	Votes	%	±%
Liberal Democrats	Doug Bagnall	2,031	48.9	−1.9
Labour	Ryan Quick	1,260	30.3	+4.7
Conservative	Sam Rimmer	751	18.1	+8.9
Green	Elizabeth McManus	111	2.7	+0.5
Majority		771	18.6	−6.6
Turnout		4,154	40.2	−4.9
Liberal Democrats hold		Swing	UKIP to Conservative 10.5	

=== Tonge with The Haulgh ward ===
Tonge with The Haulgh ward
Party	Candidate	Votes	%	±%
Labour	Nick Peel	1,379	50.4	+4.5
Conservative	Matthew Littler	928	33.9	+19.4
UKIP	Derek Wunderley	232	8.5	−24.9
Liberal Democrats	Rosalind Harasiwka	113	4.1	+0.6
Green	James Tomkinson	82	3.0	+0.3
Majority		451	16.5	+4.0
Turnout		2,734	31.0	−4.3
Labour hold		Swing	UKIP to Conservative 22.1	

=== Westhoughton North and Chew Moor ward ===
Westhoughton North and Chew Moor ward
Party	Candidate	Votes	%	±%
Conservative	Martyn Cox	1,831	42.6	+3.6
Liberal Democrats	Bernadette Eckersley-Fallon	1,386	32.2	+23.4
Labour	Ged Carter	784	18.2	−14.3
Independent	Jack Speight	236	5.5	+5.5
Green	Heather Rylance	61	2.6	−0.2
Majority		445	10.5	+4.1
Turnout		4,300	39.7	+1.2
Conservative hold		Swing	UKIP to Lib Dem 20.2	

=== Westhoughton South ward ===
Westhoughton South ward
Party	Candidate	Votes	%	±%
Liberal Democrats	David Wilkinson	1,934	53.2	+24.2
Labour	Ryan Battersby	899	24.7	−8.0
Conservative	Martin Tighe	804	22.1	+1.8
Majority		1,035	28.4	
Turnout		3,637	37.0	+1.2
Liberal Democrats gain from Labour		Swing	UKIP to Lib Dem 21.1	
