= Farnworth and Kearsley First =

- Leader: Tracey Wilkinson
- Registered: 13 September 2017
- Bolton Council: 3 / 60

Farnworth and Kearsley First is a local political party to represent the views of the towns of Farnworth and Kearsley in the Metropolitan Borough of Bolton, Greater Manchester, England. It currently has three elected councillors.

== History ==
The party received confirmation of its official party status from the Electoral Commission on 13 September 2017. The party won its first seat to Bolton Council by winning a by-election on 8 March 2018. Two months later, the party won two more seats in the 2018 Bolton Council election. In the 2019 Bolton Council election, the party won two further seats.

After the 2019 local election, the incumbent Labour elected 24 elected councillors, losing their majority on the council that they had maintained since 2011, and the leadership that they had maintained since 2006.

Farnworth and Kearsley First agreed with the six Liberal Democrats councillors, three UKIP councillors and two Horwich & Blackrod First Independents councillors, to provide a confidence and supply agreement with the Conservative Party who have 20 elected councillors.

In 2020, one of the party's founding members, Paul Heslop, left the party after "'struggling' with the party's direction", starting a new party called "One Kearsley". In the 2023 Bolton local elections Heslop's party won 3 seats, with Farnworth and Kersley First having been reduced to 2 seats. Paul Heslop resigned on 2 October 2023, and Farnworth and Kearsley First won back the vacant Kearsley seat on 16 November 2023, giving the party three serving councillors covering both Farnworth and Kearsley towns. In the May 2026 election, the party lost in the three seats it contested, leaving it with three seats.
