= Horwich Urban District =

Former local government district in England

Coordinates: 53.5922°N 2.5414°W

- Area
  - 1911: 3,257 acres (13.2 km^{2})
  - 1971: 3,257 acres (13.2 km^{2})
- Population
  - 1891: 12,850
  - 1971: 16,465
- History
  - Created: 1872
  - Abolished: 1974
  - Succeeded by: Metropolitan Borough of Bolton
- Status: Local board (1872–1894); Urban district (1894–1974)
  - HQ: Horwich Public Hall

Horwich was, from 1872 to 1974, a local government district centred on the town of Horwich in the administrative county of Lancashire, England.

== History ==
Horwich was a township and chapelry in the civil and ecclesiastical parish of Deane in the Salford Hundred of Lancashire. The township became part of the Bolton Poor Law Union on 1 February 1837 which took responsibility for funding the Poor Law within that Union area. In 1866, Horwich was given the status of a civil parish.

In 1872, a local board of health was adopted for the civil parish of Horwich. After the Public Health Act 1875 was passed by Parliament in that year, Horwich Local Board of Health assumed extra duties as an urban sanitary district, although the Local Board's title did not change.

Following the implementation of the Local Government Act 1894, Horwich Local Board was replaced by an elected urban district council of twelve members. Horwich Urban District Council had four electoral wards: Central, East, North, and South, each represented by three councillors.

Under the Local Government Act 1972, Horwich Urban District was abolished on 1 April 1974 and its former area became a successor parish in the Metropolitan Borough of Bolton in Greater Manchester.

== See also ==
- Horwich Town Council
