= 2019 Bolton Metropolitan Borough Council election =

Election in Bolton, England

Bolton Metropolitan Council Election 2019
- 2 May 2019

20 Seats up for Election
	First party	Second party	Third party
Party	Labour	Conservative	Liberal Democrats
Seats before	30	19	3
Seats after	24	20	6
Seat change	▼7	▲1	▲3
Popular vote	22,927	20,862	9,283
Percentage	32.8%	29.8%	13.3%
	Fourth party	Fifth party	Sixth party
Party	Farnworth and Kearsley First	UKIP	Horwich and Blackrod First
Seats before	3	3	1
Seats after	5	3	2
Seat change	▲2	Steady	▲1
Popular vote	5,162	7,809	3,059
Percentage	7.4%	11.2%	4.4%
	Seventh party
Party	Independent Politician
Seats before	1
Seats after	1
Seat change	Steady
Popular vote	881
Percentage	1.3%
Leader of the Council before election
Labour
Leader of the Council
Conservative

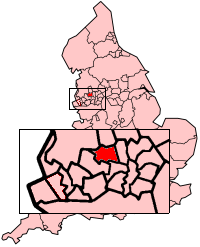
The Metropolitan Borough of Bolton shown within England.

The 2019 Bolton Metropolitan Borough Council election took place on 2 May 2019 to elect members of Bolton Council in Greater Manchester, England. This was on the same day as other local elections. The Labour Party, which had run the council since 2006 and had maintained a majority since 2011, lost overall control of the Council.

20 seats were contested and the Labour Party won 6 seats, the Conservative Party won 6 seats, the Liberal Democrats won 3 seats, Farnworth and Kearsley First won 2 seats, Horwich and Blackrod First won 2 seats, and UKIP won 1 seat.

After the election, the total composition of the council was as follows:

- Labour 24
- Conservative 20
- Liberal Democrats 6
- Farnworth and Kearsley First 5
- UK Independence Party 3
- Horwich and Blackrod First 2

The Conservatives formed an agreement with all the other opposition parties, the Liberal Democrats, Farnworth and Kearsley First, UKIP and Horwich and Blackrod First in order to form a minority administration. For the first time since the period between 2004 and 2006, the Labour Party went into opposition. This was also the first time in history at Bolton Council that the party with the largest number of seats was not in charge of running the council.

== Election results ==
2019 Bolton Metropolitan Borough Council election
Party	This election				Full council			This election		
Party	Candidates	Seats	Net	Seats %	Other	Total	Total %	Votes	Votes %	+/−
Labour	{{{candidates}}}	6	▼7	35.0	18	24	40.0	22,920	31.4	–6.6
Conservative	{{{candidates}}}	6	▲1	35.0	14	20	33.3	20,862	28.6	–5.4
Liberal Democrats	{{{candidates}}}	3	▲2	15.0	3	6	10.0	9,283	12.7	–1.1
Farnworth and Kearsley First	{{{candidates}}}	2	▲2	10.0	3	5	8.3	5,162	7.1	+1.3
UKIP	{{{candidates}}}	1	Steady	5.0	2	3	5.0	7,809	10.7	+7.8
Horwich and Blackrod First	{{{candidates}}}	2	▲2	10.0	0	2	3.3	3,059	4.2	New
Green	{{{candidates}}}	0	Steady	0.0	0	0	0.0	2,237	3.1	+0.4
Independent	{{{candidates}}}	0	Steady	0.0	0	0	0.0	1,607	2.1	+0.1

== Council composition ==
Prior to the election the composition of the council was:

↓
31	19	4	3	3
Labour	Conservative	LD	U	IND

After the election the composition of the council was:

↓
24	20	6	3	7
Labour	Conservative	LD	U	IND

LD - Liberal Democrats
U - UKIP
IND - Independent (politician

== Ward results ==
Winning candidates are highlighted in bold.

=== Astley Bridge ward ===
Astley Bridge ward
Party	Candidate	Votes	%	±%
**Conservative**	**Paul Wild**	**1,732**	**39.4**	**−3.1**
Liberal Democrats	Warren Fox	1,417	32.2	−3.9
Labour	Steve Sutton	597	13.6	−7.8
Independent	Mohammed Tanveer Akhtar	369	8.4	+8.4
UKIP	Paul Gannon	283	6.4	+6.4
Majority		315	7.2	+0.8
Turnout		4,398	43.0	+1.0
Conservative **hold**		Swing	Labour to Independent 8.1	

=== Bradshaw ward ===
Bradshaw ward
Party	Candidate	Votes	%	±%
**Conservative**	**Stuart Haslam**	**1,888**	**55.6**	**−1.5**
Labour	Kirith Ahluwalia	464	13.7	−12.1
Independent	Eric Hyland	333	9.8	+1.7
UKIP	Chris Marcroft	329	9.7	+9.7
Liberal Democrats	Stephen Howarth	200	5.9	+0.8
Green	Laura Diggle	179	5.3	+1.4
Majority		1,424	42.0	+10.7
Turnout		3,393	38.1	+0.0
Conservative **hold**		Swing	Labour to UKIP 10.9	

=== Breightmet ward ===
Breightmet ward
Party	Candidate	Votes	%	±%
**Conservative**	**Beverley Fletcher**	**1,344**	**41.2**	**−6.2**
Labour	John Byrne	1,060	32.5	−6.6
UKIP	Ryan Wood	627	19.2	+11.8
Green	Trish Bolton	138	4.2	+0.0
Liberal Democrats	Elizabeth Turner	95	2.9	+1.0
Majority		284	8.7	+0.4
Turnout		3,264	35.1	+0.7
Conservative **gain** from Labour		Swing	Labour to UKIP 9.2	

=== Bromley Cross ward ===
Bromley Cross ward
Party	Candidate	Votes	%	±%
**Conservative**	**Samantha Connor**	**2,566**	**62.5**	**−10.8**
Labour	James Entwistle-Wilkinson	658	16.0	−9.6
UKIP	William Roger Townshend	342	8.3	+8.3
Green	Liz Spencer	296	7.2	−2.2
Liberal Democrats	Matthew Allen	241	5.9	−1.7
Majority		1,905	46.4	
Turnout		4,103	39.9	
Conservative **hold**				

=== Crompton ward ===
Crompton ward
Party	Candidate	Votes	%	±%
**Labour**	**Martin McMulkin**	**2,078**	**50.5**	**−6.6**
Conservative	Siraj Patel	1,243	30.2	+11.6
UKIP	Jeff Armstrong	470	11.4	+11.4
Green	Dan Bolton	164	4.0	+4.0
Liberal Democrats	Michael Langdon	158	3.8	−2.6
Majority		835	20.3	−18.2
Turnout		4,113	38.1	+1.3
Labour **hold**		Swing	Labour to Conservative 9.3	

=== Farnworth ward ===
Farnworth ward
Party	Candidate	Votes	%	±%
**Farnworth and Kearsley First**	**Lisa Weatherby**	**1,864**	**52.9**	**−1.0**
Labour	Jean Gillies	1,270	36.0	−1.3
UKIP	John Cotter	176	2.9	−2.1
Conservative	Jennifer Kirk	124	4.5	−1.0
Liberal Democrats	Christine McPherson	51	1.4	+0.0
For Britain	Simon Collins	38	1.1	+1.1
Majority		594	16.7	+0.2
Turnout		3,522	33.7	+3.7
Farnworth and Kearsley First **gain** from Labour		Swing		

=== Great Lever ward ===
Great Lever ward
Party	Candidate	Votes	%	±%
**Labour**	**Madeline Murray**	**1,928**	**51.2**	**−24.8**
Conservative	Arfan Khan	1,254	33.6	+21.4
UKIP	Derek R Wunderley	272	7.3	+7.3
Green	David Figgins	169	4.5	−2.8
Liberal Democrats	Duncan McPherson	105	2.8	−1.7
Majority		674	18.1	−45.7
Turnout		3,728	38.5	+5.6
Labour **hold**		Swing	Labour to Conservative 23.1	

=== Halliwell ward ===
Halliwell ward
Party	Candidate	Votes	%	±%
**Labour**	**Linda Thomas**	**1,770**	**63.6**	**−6.6**
Conservative	Yasir Waseem Faisal	370	13.3	−0.3
UKIP	Sandra Harvey	295	10.6	+10.6
Green	Pamela Spurling	140	5.0	+1.2
Liberal Democrats	John Falch	118	4.2	+0.4
Independent	Anthony Massey	89	3.2	+0.9
Majority		1,400	50.3	−6.5
Turnout		2,782	32.0	−3.2
Labour **hold**		Swing	Labour to UKIP 8.6	

=== Harper Green ward ===
Harper Green ward
Party	Candidate	Votes	%	±%
**Labour**	**Susan Haworth**	**1,484**	**46.5**	**−6.8**
Farnworth and Kearsley First	Peter Flitcroft	923	28.9	+3.8
Conservative	Robert Tyler	285	8.9	−4.5
UKIP	David Harvey	266	8.3	+3.9
Green	Matthew Barnes	92	2.9	+1.1
Liberal Democrats	Kevin Walsh	52	1.6	−0.1
Independent	Harun Abdullahi Mohamed	90	2.8	+2.8
Majority		561	17.6	−10.8
Turnout		3,192	32.5	−3.6
Labour **hold**		Swing	Labour to UKIP 5.3	

=== Heaton and Lostock ward ===
Heaton and Lostock ward
Party	Candidate	Votes	%	±%
**Conservative**	**Robert Allen**	**2,324**	**54.2**	**−12.2**
Labour	John Gillatt	1,026	23.9	−3.7
Liberal Democrats	Sue Priest	437	10.2	+4.3
UKIP	Daniel Wheatley	276	6.4	+6.4
Green	Heather Rylance	227	5.3	+5.3
Majority		1,298	30.2	−8.6
Turnout		4,290	40.5	−1.8
Conservative **hold**		Swing		

=== Horwich and Blackrod ward ===
Horwich and Blackrod ward
Party	Candidate	Votes	%	±%
**Horwich and Blackrod First**	**Peter Wright**	**1,482**	**37.4**	**+37.4**
Labour	Stephen Pickup	1,041	26.3	−14.7
Conservative	Michael Baines	978	24.7	−22.9
UKIP	Samantha Jane Chadwick	199	5.0	+5.0
Liberal Democrats	Rebecca Forrest	133	3.3	−3.3
Green	Keith Cocker	130	3.3	−1.5
Majority		441	11.1	
Turnout		3,963	38.2	+4.5
Horwich and Blackrod First **gain** from Labour		Swing	Conservative to HBFI 30.0	

=== Horwich North East ward ===
Horwich North East ward
Party	Candidate	Votes	%	±%
**Horwich and Blackrod First**	**Marie Brady**	**1,577**	**37.5**	**+37.5**
Liberal Democrats	Gordon Stone	984	23.4	−11.1
Labour	Joyce Kellett	926	22.0	−14.0
Conservative	Emily Siddall	370	8.8	−15.0
UKIP	Zak Brown	203	4.8	+4.8
Green	Rod Riesco	140	3.3	−2.4
Majority		593	14.1	
Turnout		4,200	43.1	+5.1
Horwich and Blackrod First **gain** from Labour		Swing		

=== Hulton ward ===
Hulton ward
Party	Candidate	Votes	%	±%
**Conservative**	**Derek Bullock**	**1,617**	**46.6**	**−3.5**
Labour	Shafaqat Shaikh	1,157	33.4	−5.8
UKIP	Amy Wunderley	389	11.2	+5.4
Green	Wendy Shepherd	181	5.2	+2.3
Liberal Democrats	Derek Gradwell	122	3.5	+1.7
Majority		460	13.3	+2.3
Turnout		3,466	35.0	−2.0
Conservative **gain** from Labour		Swing	Labour to UKIP 5.6	

=== Kearsley ward ===
Kearsley ward
Party	Candidate	Votes	%	±%
**Farnworth and Kearsley First**	**Paul Heslop**	**2,376**	**67.8**	**+15.5**
Labour	Kevan Jones	529	15.1	−9.6
UKIP	William Pilkington	283	8.1	−3.1
Conservative	Kamaran Fathulla	192	5.5	−2.6
Liberal Democrats	Connor Goodwin	128	3.6	−0.1
Majority		1,847	52.6	+25.1
Turnout		3,508	34.0	−0.1
Farnworth and Kearsley First **gain** from Labour		Swing	Labour to FKF 12.5	

=== Little Lever and Darcy Lever ward ===
Little Lever and Darcy Lever ward
Party	Candidate	Votes	%	±%
**UKIP**	**Sean Hornby**	**1,395**	**39.3**	**+11.5**
Conservative	David Meehan	1,060	29.8	−0.2
Labour	Kevin Allsop	928	26.1	−11.4
Liberal Democrats	Kevin Mulligan	169	4.7	−0.1
Majority		335	9.4	
Turnout		3,552	37.2	+2.5
UKIP **hold**		Swing	Labour to UKIP 11.4	

=== Rumworth ward ===
Rumworth ward
Party	Candidate	Votes	%	±%
**Labour**	**Ebrahim Adia**	**2,541**	**72.9**	**−2.8**
Conservative	Hafiz Butt	380	11.0	−0.2
Green	Alan Johnson	275	7.9	+0.5
UKIP	Michael Armstrong	221	6.3	+6.3
Liberal Democrats	David Cooper	72	2.1	−0.4
Majority		2,161	61.9	−2.6
Turnout		3,489	35.6	+1.2
Labour **hold**		Swing	Labour to UKIP 4.5	

=== Smithills ward ===
Smithills ward
Party	Candidate	Votes	%	±%
**Liberal Democrats**	**Gary Veevers**	**1,968**	**52.2**	**+3.3**
Labour	Ruth Pitchford	864	22.9	−7.4
UKIP	Joe Harris	479	12.7	+12.7
Conservative	Sam Rimmer	457	12.1	−6.0
Majority		1,104	29.3	+10.7
Turnout		3,768	36.0	−4.2
Liberal Democrats **hold**		Swing	Labour to UKIP 10.0	

=== Tonge with The Haulgh ward ===
Tonge with The Haulgh ward
Party	Candidate	Votes	%	±%
**Labour**	**Elaine Sherrington**	**1,152**	**42.2**	**−8.2**
Conservative	Brian Matthews	760	27.8	−6.1
UKIP	Trevor Jones	663	24.3	+16.3
Liberal Democrats	Rosalind Harasiwka	154	5.6	+1.5
Majority		392	14.4	−2.1
Turnout		2,729	31.3	+0.3
Labour **hold**		Swing	Labour to UKIP 12.2	

=== Westhoughton North and Chew Moor ward ===
Westhoughton North and Chew Moor ward
Party	Candidate	Votes	%	±%
**Liberal Democrats**	**Bernadette Eckersley-Fallon**	**1,565**	**39.0**	**+6.8**
Conservative	Zoe Jennifer Catherine Kirk-Robinson	1,270	31.7	−11.9
Labour	Mike Jarvis	565	14.1	−4.1
Westhoughton First Independent	Jack Speight	319	7.9	+1.2
UKIP	Kieran Boardman	292	7.3	+7.3
Majority		295	7.3	
Turnout		4,011	37.3	−2.4
Liberal Democrats **gain** from Conservative		Swing	Conservative to UKIP 9.6	

=== Westhoughton South ward ===
Westhoughton South ward
Party	Candidate	Votes	%	±%
**Liberal Democrats**	**Deirdre McGeown**	**1,114**	**33.1**	**−20.1**
Labour	David Chadwick	889	26.5	+1.8
Conservative	Martin Tighe	648	19.2	−2.9
UKIP	Jenny Armstrong	349	10.4	+10.4
Majority		225	6.7	−4.5
Turnout		3,369	34.7	+2.3
Liberal Democrats **gain** from Labour		Swing	Liberal Democrats to Independents 15.5	
