= Bolton Council =

English local authority

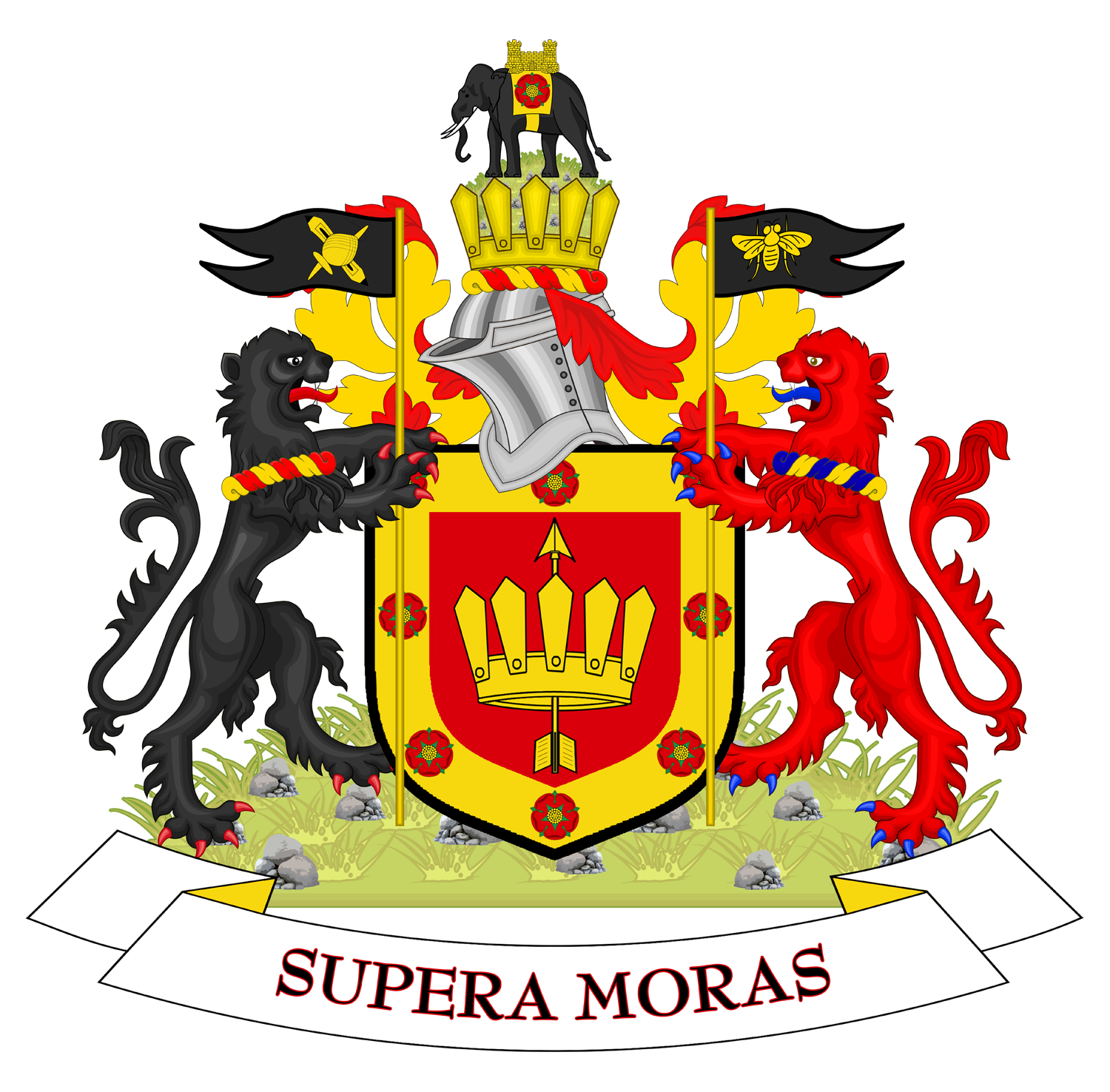

- Council Logo

Type
- Type: Metropolitan borough council

History
- Founded: 1 April 1974

Leadership
- Mayor: Mohammed Iqbal, Labour since 13 May 2026
- Leader: Akhtar Zaman, Labour since 20 May 2026
- Chief Executive: Sue Johnson since 26 September 2022

Structure
- Seats: 60 councillors
- Graph of the party split among 60 seats.
- Political groups: Administration (20) Labour (20) Other parties (40) Conservative (10) Reform (10) Liberal Democrats (6) Horwich and Blackrod First (5) Green (4) Farnworth and Kearsley First (3) Independent (2)
- Joint committees: Greater Manchester Combined Authority; Greater Manchester Police, Fire and Crime Panel
- Length of term: 4 years

Elections
- Voting system: First-past-the-post
- Last election: 7 May 2026
- Next election: 6 May 2027

Meeting place
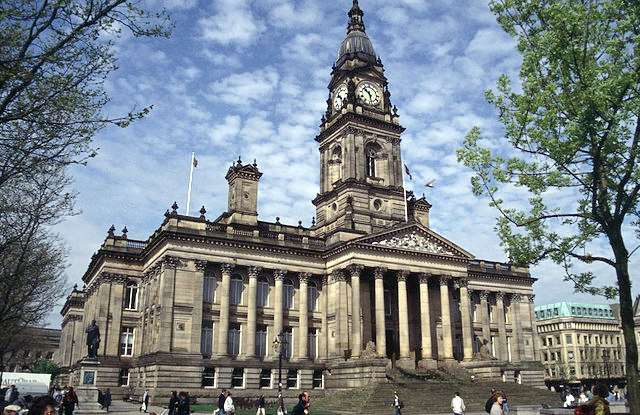
- Town Hall, Victoria Square, Bolton, BL1 1RU

Website
- www.bolton.gov.uk

Bolton Council, or Bolton Metropolitan Borough Council, is the local authority of the Metropolitan Borough of Bolton in Greater Manchester, England. It is a metropolitan borough council and provides the majority of local government services in the borough. The council has been a member of the Greater Manchester Combined Authority since 2011.

The council has been under no overall control since 2019, and has been led by a Labour minority administration since 2023. It is based at Bolton Town Hall.

== History ==
The town of Bolton had been incorporated as a municipal borough in 1838, governed by a body formally called the 'Mayor, Aldermen and Burgesses of the Borough of Bolton', generally known as the corporation, town council or borough council. When elected County Councils were established in 1889, Bolton was considered large enough for its existing council to provide county-level services, and so it was made a county borough, independent from the new Lancashire County Council, whilst remaining part of the geographical county of Lancashire.

The larger Metropolitan Borough of Bolton and its council were created in 1974 under the Local Government Act 1972 as one of ten metropolitan districts within the new metropolitan county of Greater Manchester. The first election was held in 1973. For its first year the Council acted as a shadow authority alongside the area's eight outgoing authorities, being the borough councils of Bolton and Farnworth, and the urban district councils of Blackrod, Horwich, Kearsley, Little Lever, Westhoughton and Turton (the latter in respect of its more built up southern part only, the more rural northern part became the parish of North Turton in Blackburn district). The new metropolitan district and its council formally came into being on 1 April 1974, at which point the old districts and their councils were abolished.

The metropolitan district was awarded borough status from its creation, allowing the chair of the council to take the title of mayor, continuing Bolton's series of mayors dating back to 1838. The council styles itself Bolton Council rather than its full formal name of Bolton Metropolitan Borough Council.

From 1974 until 1986 the council was a lower-tier authority, with upper-tier functions provided by the Greater Manchester County Council. The county council was abolished in 1986 and its functions passed to Greater Manchester's ten borough councils, including Bolton, with some services provided through joint committees.

Since 2011 the council has been a member of the Greater Manchester Combined Authority, which has been led by the directly elected Mayor of Greater Manchester since 2017. The combined authority provides strategic leadership and co-ordination for certain functions across Greater Manchester, notably regarding transport and town planning, but Bolton Council continues to be responsible for most local government functions.

== Governance ==
Bolton Council provides Metropolitan Borough services. Some strategic functions in the area are provided by the Greater Manchester Combined Authority; the leader of Bolton Council sits on the combined authority as Bolton's representative. Blackrod, Horwich and Westhoughton are civil parishes, each with a town council forming an additional tier of local government, the rest of the borough is unparished.

=== Political control ===
Since the 2019 election, Bolton has been under no overall control. Following the 2023 election a Labour minority administration formed to run the council. The minority administration continued following the 2024 election, and the 2026 election.

Political control of the council since the 1974 reforms took effect has been as follows:

Party in control	Years
Conservative	1974–1980
Labour	1980–2003
No overall control	2003–2011
Labour	2011–2019
No overall control	2019–present

=== Leadership ===
The role of Mayor of Bolton is largely ceremonial. Political leadership is instead provided by the leader of the council. The leaders since 1974 have been:

Councillor	Party	From	To
John Hanscomb	Conservative	1 Apr 1974	May 1980
Bob Howarth	Labour	May 1980	Jun 2004
Barbara Ronson	Liberal Democrats	Jun 2004	May 2006
Cliff Morris	Labour	24 May 2006	31 Dec 2017
Linda Thomas	Labour	5 Feb 2018	May 2019
David Greenhalgh	Conservative	22 May 2019	29 Jul 2021
Martyn Cox	Conservative	25 Aug 2021	16 May 2023
Nick Peel	Labour	16 May 2023	May 2026
Akhtar Zaman	Labour	20 May 2026	

=== Composition ===
Following the 2026 election and subsequent changes to July 2026 the composition of the council was:

Party	Seats
Labour	19
Conservative	10
Reform	10
Liberal Democrats	5
Horwich and Blackrod First	5
Green	4
Farnworth and Kearsley First	3
Independent	4
Total	60

Two of the independent councillors form the "Communities First" group. The next election is due in May 2027.

== Elections ==
Since the last boundary changes in 2023, the council has comprised 60 councillors representing 20 Wards, with each Ward electing three councillors. Elections are held three years out of every four, with a third of the council (one councillor for each ward) elected each time for a four-year term of office.

== Wards and Councillors ==
There are 20 wards, each represented by three councillors.

Ward	Councillor	Party	Date first elected	Term of office
Astley Bridge
Astley Bridge	Hilary Fairclough (Note: Deputy Leader of the Conservative Group)	Conservative	4 May 2000	2023–27
Astley Bridge	Toby Hewitt	Conservative	2 May 2024	2024–28
Astley Bridge	Ryan Bailey	Reform	7 May 2026	2026–30
Bradshaw
Bradshaw	James Moller	Conservative	4 May 2023	2023–27
Bradshaw	Jackie Schofield	Labour Co-op	2 May 2024	2024–28
Bradshaw	Les Webb	Conservative	4 May 2023	2026–30
Breightmet
Breightmet	Sean Fielding	Labour Co-op	4 May 2023	2023–27
Breightmet	Robert Morrisey	Labour Co-op	4 May 2023	2024–28
Breightmet	Mike Tucker	Reform	7 May 2026	2026–30
Bromley Cross
Bromley Cross	Samantha Jayne Connor	Conservative	2 May 2019	2023–27
Bromley Cross	Nadim Muslim (Note: Leader of the Conservative Group)	Conservative	3 May 2018	2024–28
Bromley Cross	Charlotte Cadden	Conservative	7 May 2026	2026–30
Farnworth North
Farnworth North	Hamid Kurram	Labour	3 May 2018	2023–27
Farnworth North	Susan Haworth	Reform	16 October 2014	2024–28
Farnworth North	Nadeem Ayub	Labour	5 May 2022	2026–30
Farnworth South
Farnworth South	Maureen Flitcroft	Farnworth and Kearsley First	4 May 2023	2023–27
Farnworth South	Paula Connor-Bennett	Farnworth and Kearsley First	2 May 2024	2024–28
Farnworth South	Julie Pattison	Reform	7 May 2026	2026–30
Great Lever
Great Lever	Mohammed Ayub	Labour	4 May 2006	2023–27
Great Lever	Karen Hon	Labour	4 May 2023	2024–28
Great Lever	Mohammed Iqbal	Labour	1 May 2008	2026–30
Halliwell
Halliwell	Rabiya Jiva	Labour	6 May 2021	2023–27
Halliwell	Hanif Alli	Green	2 May 2024	2024–28
Halliwell	Baggy Khan	Green	7 May 2026	2026–30
Heaton, Lostock and Chew Moor
Heaton, Lostock and Chew Moor	Martyn Cox	Conservative	6 May 2010	2023–27
Heaton, Lostock and Chew Moor	Andrew Morgan	Conservative	7 May 2015	2024–28
Heaton, Lostock and Chew Moor	Anne Galloway	Conservative	3 May 2018	2026–30
Horwich North
Horwich North	Ryan Bamforth	Independent / Communities First (Note: Part of the "Communities First" coalition.)	4 May 2023	2023–27
Horwich North	Victoria Rigby	Horwich and Blackrod First	4 May 2023	2024–28
Horwich North	Andrea Finney	Horwich and Blackrod First	7 May 2026	2026–30
Horwich South and Blackrod
Horwich South and Blackrod	David Grant	Horwich and Blackrod First	6 May 2021	2023–27
Horwich South and Blackrod	Samantha Williamson	Independent / Communities First (Note: Part of the "Communities First" coalition.)	3 May 2018	2024–28
Horwich South and Blackrod	Peter Wright	Horwich and Blackrod First	2 May 2019	2026–30
Hulton
Hulton	Shafaqat Shaikh	Labour	4 May 2023	2023–27
Hulton	Fazeelah Khan	Labour	2 May 2024	2024–28
Hulton	Derek Bullock	Reform	7 May 2026	2026–30
Kearsley
Kearsley	Debbie Newall	Labour (Note: Elected in May 2022 as a One Kearsley candidate and crossed the floor to the Labour Party in October 2023)	5 May 2022	2023–27
Kearsley	Sylvia Crossley	Farnworth and Kearsley First	2 May 2024	2024–28
Kearsley	Roger Pedley	Reform	7 May 2026	2026–30
Little Lever and Darcy Lever
Little Lever and Darcy Lever	Andrea Taylor-Burke	Independent (Note: Represented the Conservative Party until the election on 7 May 2026 then stepped away to serve the rest of her term as an independent.)	6 May 2021	2023–27
Little Lever and Darcy Lever	Liam Barnard	Labour	4 May 2023	2024–28
Little Lever and Darcy Lever	Derek Wunderley	Reform	7 May 2026	2026–30
Queens Park and Central
Queens Park and Central	Akhtar Zaman (Note: Leader of the Labour Group)	Labour	2 May 2002	2023–27
Queens Park and Central	Linda Thomas	Labour Co-op	5 October 1995	2024–28
Queens Park and Central	Zan Arif	Green	7 May 2026	2026–30
Rumworth
Rumworth	Abdul Atcha	Labour	5 May 2022	2023–27
Rumworth	Ayyub Patel	Labour	2 May 2024	2024–28
Rumworth	Zan Arif	Green	7 May 2026	2026–30
Smithills
Smithills	Roger Hayes	Liberal Democrats	7 May 1998	2023–27
Smithills	Garry Veevers (Note: Leader of the Liberal Democrat Group)	Liberal Democrats	2 May 2019	2024–28
Smithills	Susan Priest	Liberal Democrats	5 May 2022	2026–30
Tonge with The Haulgh
Tonge with The Haulgh	Martin Donaghy	Labour Co-op	3 May 2012	2023–27
Tonge with The Haulgh	Emily Mort	Labour Co-op	5 May 2022	2024–28
Tonge with The Haulgh	Trevor Jones (Note: Leader of the Reform UK Group)	Reform	7 May 2026	2026–30
Westhoughton North and Hunger Hill
Westhoughton North and Hunger Hill	Arthur Price	Liberal Democrats	4 May 2023	2023–27
Westhoughton North and Hunger Hill	Deirdre McGeown	Liberal Democrats	16 November 2023 (Note: By-election following the resignation of Bernadette Eckersley-Fallon.)	2024–28
Westhoughton North and Hunger Hill	David Lewis	Reform	7 May 2026	2026–30
Westhoughton South
Westhoughton South	David Chadwick	Labour	4 May 2023	2023–27
Westhoughton South	John McHugh	Labour	2 May 2024	2024–28
Westhoughton South	Glen Clarke	Reform	7 May 2026	2026–30

== Premises ==
The council is based at Bolton Town Hall on Victoria Square in the centre of Bolton. The building was completed in 1873 for the old Bolton Borough Council.
