= Martyn Cox =

British Conservative politician

Leader of Bolton Metropolitan Borough Council
- In office 25 August 2021 – 16 May 2023
- Preceded by: David Greenhalgh
- Succeeded by: Nick Peel

Member of the Greater Manchester Combined Authority
- In office August 2021 – May 2023
- Preceded by: David Greenhalgh
- Succeeded by: Nick Peel

Deputy Leader of Bolton Metropolitan Borough Council
- In office May 2019 – 25 August 2021

Member of Bolton Metropolitan Borough Council for Westhoughton North and Chew Moor
- Incumbent
- Assumed office 6 May 2010
- Majority: 445

Personal details
- Party: Conservative
- Education: University of Plymouth

Martyn Andrew Cox is a British Conservative politician and was Leader of Bolton Council in Greater Manchester between and 2021 and 2023. As Leader he was also a member of the Greater Manchester Combined Authority and was the Combined Authority's portfolio lead for culture.

He was first elected as a Councillor in 2003 as a Liberal Democrat in Horwich & Blackrod Ward but stood down from this role 2007. In 2010 he returned to the Council winning his current seat in the Ward of Westhoughton North and Chew Moor. He was elected as Leader of the Council in August 2021 following the death of David Greenhalgh the previous month.

- He was successful in communicating directly with ministers, which led to the reversal of a decision that brought in £25 million to the town.
- Under his leadership, the council won several other bids worth a combined £149 million, including £20 million of levelling up funds for a new medical college.

Political offices
Preceded by David Greenhalgh	Leader of Bolton Metropolitan Borough Council; 2021–present	Succeeded by Nick Peel
