= Horwich and Blackrod First =

Horwich and Blackrod First Independents
- Abbreviation: HBFI
- Founded: 7 August 2018; 8 years ago
- Registered: 8 February 2019
- Horwich Town Council: 13 / 14
- Blackrod Town Council: 8 / 9
- Bolton Council: 6 / 60

Website
- hbfi.org.uk

Horwich and Blackrod First Independents (HBFI) is a local political party which was formed by Independent Councillors and a group of local residents in the towns of Horwich and Blackrod within the Metropolitan Borough of Bolton, Greater Manchester, England, in the historic County of Lancashire.

== Formation ==
The party was formed on 7 August 2018 at a meeting held at Horwich RMI Cricket Club. The party was formed from two local community groups (Horwich First & Blackrod First), as well as local residents and independent Town Councillors, received confirmation of its official party status from the Electoral Commission on 8 February 2019. It does not operate a whip.

== History ==
In the 2019 Bolton Council election, the party won two seats to Bolton Council and gained another seat in 2021 local elections. And following the 2019 town council elections, the party had eleven of the fourteen seats on Horwich Town Council. In April 2022, the party's Leader, Councillor Marie Brady who was a member of both Bolton Council and Horwich Town Council resigned as Leader and quit the party defecting to the Conservative Party citing major internal differences within the party as the reason for leaving. This left the party holding two Bolton Council seats and ten Horwich Town Council seats.
