= Bolton Metropolitan Borough Council elections =

Local government elections in Greater Manchester, England

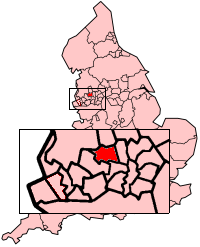
The Metropolitan Borough of Bolton shown within England.

Bolton Metropolitan Borough Council elections are generally held three years out of every four, with a third of the council being elected each time. Bolton Metropolitan Borough Council, generally known as Bolton Council, is the local authority for the metropolitan borough of Bolton in Greater Manchester, England. Since the last boundary changes in 2023, 60 councillors have been elected from 20 wards.

== Council elections ==
Between 1973 and 1980, there were 69 councillors; three seats for each of the 23 wards. Following ward boundary changes for the 1980 election, the number of wards was reduced to 20 and all 60 seats were contested. Further boundary changes were made for the 2004 election and again all council seats were contested.

- 1973 election
- 1975 election
- 1976 election
- 1978 election
- 1979 election
- 1980 election
- 1982 election
- 1983 election
- 1984 election
- 1986 election
- 1987 election
- 1988 election
- 1990 election
- 1991 election
- 1992 election
- 1994 election
- 1995 election
- 1996 election
- 1998 election
- 1999 election
- 2000 election
- 2002 election
- 2003 election
- 2004 election
- 2006 election
- 2007 election
- 2008 election
- 2010 election
- 2011 election
- 2012 election
- 2014 election
- 2015 election
- 2016 election
- 2018 election
- 2019 election
- 2021 election
- 2022 election
- 2023 election
- 2024 election
- 2026 election

== Results maps ==
2004 results map

2006 results map

2007 results map

2008 results map

2010 results map

2011 results map

2012 results map

2014 results map

2015 results map

2016 results map

2018 results map

2019 results map

2021 results map

2022 results map

2023 results map

2024 results map

2026 results map

== By-election results ==
=== 1994-1998 ===
Daubhill ward by-election 10 April 1997 (Triggered by the disqualification of Cllr. Martin Donaghy)
Party	Candidate	Votes	%	±%
Labour	Dennis Barlow	1,402	68.8	
Conservative	Jean Walsh	332	16.3	
Liberal Democrats	Margaret Rothwell	182	8.9	
Socialist Labour	Doris Kelly	120	5.9	
Majority		1,070	52.5	
Turnout		2,036	24.0	
Labour hold				

=== 2002-2006 ===
Daubhill ward by-election 21 November 2002 (Triggered by the death of Cllr. Dennis Barlow)
Party	Candidate	Votes	%	±%
Labour	Paul Fitzpatrick	721	37.3	−18.4
Liberal Democrats	Linden Greensitt	625	32.3	+15.3
Conservative	Yakub Jiva	587	30.4	+3.0
Majority		96	5.0	
Turnout		1,933	21.4	
Labour hold				

=== 2006-2010 ===
Crompton ward by-election 13 July 2006 (Triggered by the resignation of Cllr. Iqbal Patel)
Party	Candidate	Votes	%	±%
Labour	Hanif Darvesh	1,793	57.4	+33.8
Conservative	Donald Fairclough	978	31.3	+11.4
Liberal Democrats	John Cronnelly	224	7.2	−39.8
Green	Rachel Mann	96	3.1	+3.1
Socialist Labour	Lynne Lowe	35	1.1	−3.7
Majority		815	26.1	
Turnout		3,126	30.7	
Labour gain from Liberal Democrats				

Daubhill ward by-election 1 October 2009 (Triggered by the resignation of Cllr. Emma Scowcroft)
Party	Candidate	Votes	%	±%
Labour	Guy Harkin	1,528	47.4	−2.6
Conservative	Kath Kavanagh	935	29.0	+1.0
Independent	Mohmed Alli	377	11.7	+11.7
Liberal Democrats	Anne Warren	284	8.8	−13.2
Green	Angela Tibke	99	3.1	+3.1
Majority		593	18.4	
Turnout		3,223	31.0	
Labour hold				

=== 2010-2014 ===
Harper Green ward by-election 19 December 2013 (Triggered by the death of Cllr. Margaret Clare)
Party	Candidate	Votes	%	±%
Labour	Asha Ali Ismail	744	51.9	−15.2
Conservative	Robert Tyler	325	22.7	+1.1
UKIP	Peter McGeehan	252	17.6	+17.6
Green	Kathy Sykes	60	4.2	+4.2
Liberal Democrats	Wendy Connor	53	3.7	−7.7
Majority		419		
Turnout		1,450		
Labour hold				

=== 2014-2018 ===
Harper Green ward by-election 16 October 2014 (Triggered by the death of Cllr. Asha Ali Ismail)
Party	Candidate	Votes	%	±%
Labour	Susan Haworth	1,176	50.7	−6.3
UKIP	Jeff Armstrong	777	33.5	+9.3
Conservative	Robert Tyler	282	12.2	0.0
Green	James Tomkinson	38	1.6	−2.2
Liberal Democrats	Rebekah Fairhurst	28	1.2	−1.7
Independent	Joseph Holt	19	0.8	+0.8
Majority		399		
Turnout				
Labour hold				

Crompton ward by-election 11 February 2016 (Triggered by the death of Cllr. Sufrana Bashir-Ismail)
Party	Candidate	Votes	%	±%
Labour	Bilkis Bashir-Ismail	1,961	70.9	+7.9
UKIP	Paul Eccles	320	11.6	+11.6
Conservative	Ryan Haslam	302	10.9	−10.8
Liberal Democrats	Garry Veevers	117	4.2	−6.1
Green	Laura Diggle	65	2.4	−2.6
Majority		1,641	28.3	
Turnout				
Labour hold				

Rumworth ward by-election 6 October 2016 (Triggered by the death of Cllr. Rosa Kay)
Party	Candidate	Votes	%	±%
Labour	Shamim Abdullah	2,152	77.1	+4.9
UKIP	Jonathan Baxendale	251	9.0	−1.0
Conservative	Mohammed Waqas	167	6.0	−4.5
Green	Alan Johnson	126	4.5	−0.5
Liberal Democrats	Rebecca Forrest	96	3.4	+1.1
Majority		1,901	68.1	
Turnout			28.4	
Labour hold				

Hulton ward by-election 18 January 2018 (Triggered by the death of Cllr. Darren Whitehead)
Party	Candidate	Votes	%	±%
Conservative	Toby Hewitt	1,455	49.4	+16.7
Labour	Rabiya Jiva	1,179	40.1	+3.0
UKIP	Beverley Fletcher	190	6.5	−18.0
Liberal Democrats	Derek Gradwell	67	2.3	−0.2
Green	James Tomkinson	52	1.8	−1.5
Majority		276		
Turnout				
Conservative gain from Labour				

Farnworth ward by-election 8 March 2018 (Triggered by the resignation of Cllr. Asif Ibrahim)
Party	Candidate	Votes	%	±%
Farnworth and Kearsley First	Paul David Sanders	1,204	47.5	+47.5
Labour	Rebecca Jane Minors	969	38.2	−10.5
UKIP	Dave Harvey	169	6.7	−30.0
Conservative	Matthew Thomas Littler	153	6.0	−2.0
Liberal Democrats	David Andrew Walsh	23	0.9	−2.2
Green	David Figgins	18	0.7	+0.7
Majority		235		
Turnout			24.32	
Farnworth and Kearsley First gain from Labour				

=== 2018-2022 ===
Bromley Cross ward by-election 28 October 2021 (Triggered by the death of Cllr. David Greenhalgh)
Party	Candidate	Votes	%	±%
Conservative	Amy Cowen	1,732	70.0	+7.5
Labour	Emily Mort	409	16.5	+0.5
Green	Liz Spencer	165	6.7	−0.5
Reform UK & Bolton For Change	Laura Armstrong	99	4.0	+4.0
Liberal Democrats	James Haslam	68	2.7	−3.2
Majority		1,323	53.5	
Turnout		2,473		
Conservative hold				

=== 2022-2026 ===
Rumworth ward by-election 15 September 2022 (Triggered by the resignation of Cllr. Ebrahim Adia)
Party	Candidate	Votes	%	±%
Conservative	Ayyub Patel	1,610	55.0	+19.5
Labour	Ismail Patel	1,102	37.6	−17.6
Green	Alan Johnson	156	5.3	−0.9
Liberal Democrats	Charles Cooper	36	1.2	−0.3
Reform UK & Bolton For Change	Rose Makar	23	0.8	−0.9
Majority		508	17.4	
Turnout		2,927		
Conservative gain from Labour				

Kearsley ward by-election 16 November 2023 (Triggered by the resignation of Cllr. Paul Heslop)
Party	Candidate	Votes	%	±%
Farnworth and Kearsley First	Tracey Wilkinson	1,081	66.0	+42.5
Labour	Jackie Schofield	365	22.3	+8.2
Reform UK & Bolton For Change	Dale Gregory	121	7.4	+1.2
Conservative	Malaika Dean	38	2.3	−6.9
Green	Alan Johnson	18	1.1	+1.1
Liberal Democrats	Charles Cooper	15	0.9	−0.1
Majority		716	43.7	
Turnout		1,638		
Farnworth and Kearsley First gain from One Kearsley				

Westhoughton North and Hunger Hill ward by-election 16 November 2023 (Triggered by the resignation of Cllr. Bernadette Eckersley-Fallon)
Party	Candidate	Votes	%	±%
Liberal Democrats	Deirdre McGeown	959	41.5	+11.3
Conservative	Andrea Finney	665	28.8	−0.7
Labour	Karen Millington	440	19.0	−1.2
Westhoughton First Independents	Jack Speight	118	5.1	−5.3
Reform UK & Bolton For Change	Jeff Armstrong	101	4.4	−0.7
Green	Wendy Shepherd	28	1.2	−3.4
Majority		294	12.7	
Turnout		2,311		
Liberal Democrats gain from Conservative				

=== 2026-2030 ===
Horwich North ward by-election 2 July 2026 (Triggered by the resignation of Cllr. Ryan Bamforth)
Party	Candidate	Votes	%	±%
Horwich and Blackrod First	John Scoble	1,186	50.0	+10.7
Reform	Wendy Parkinson	541	22.8	−2.8
Labour	Graham Dawson	343	14.5	+3.5
Green	Nicola Salmon	189	8.0	−4.1
Conservative	Raymond Ndokwo	71	3.0	−2.3
Liberal Democrats	Scott Turner-Preece	27	1.1	−0.4
Independent	Peter Hopkinson	13	0.5	+0.5
Majority		645	27.2	
Turnout		2,370		
Horwich and Blackrod First hold				

Rumworth ward by-election 30 July 2026 (Triggered by the resignation of Cllr. Abdul Atcha)
Party	Candidate	Votes	%	±%
Independent	Yusuf Davda	1,458	42.3	+42.3
Labour	Sajid Pathan	1,054	30.6	−4.5
Green	Alan Johnson	517	15.0	−34.7
Reform	Ghansham Patel	279	8.1	−1.7
Conservative	Marcellus Mbah	60	1.7	−0.8
Independent	Wendy Hopkinson	45	1.3	+1.3
Liberal Democrats	Gillian Wroe	37	1.1	−1.8
Majority		404	11.7	
Turnout		3,450		
Independent gain from Labour				
