= 1987 Bolton Metropolitan Borough Council election =

1987 UK local government election

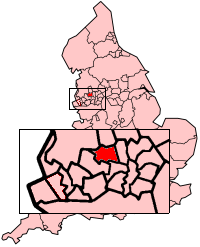
The Metropolitan Borough of Bolton shown within England

The 1987 Bolton Metropolitan Borough Council election took place on 7 May 1987 to elect members of Bolton Metropolitan Borough Council in Greater Manchester, England. One third of the council was up for election and the Labour Party kept overall control of the council.

20 seats were contested in the election: 13 were won by the Labour Party, 6 by the Conservative Party, and 1 by the Liberal Party. After the election, the composition of the council was:

- Labour 38
- Conservative 16
- Liberal Party 5
- Social Democratic Party 1

== Election result ==
Bolton local election result 1987
Party	Seats	Gains	Losses	Net gain/loss	Seats %	Votes %	Votes	+/−
Labour	13	0	0	0		41.1	36,959	-4.5
Conservative	6	0	1	-1		35.8	32,191	+4.4
Alliance	1	1	0	+1		22.3	20,051	-0.4
Other parties	0	0	0	0		0.9	811	+0.9

== Council Composition ==
Prior to the election the composition of the council was:

↓
38	17	5
Labour	Conservative	L

After the election the composition of the council was:

↓
38	16	6
Labour	Conservative	L

LD – Liberal / SDP Alliance

== Ward results ==
=== Astley Bridge ward ===
Astley Bridge ward
Party	Candidate	Votes	%	±%
Conservative	J Walsh	2,752	54.7	+3.1
Labour	S Marsland	1,488	29.6	−4.1
SDP	M Langdon	787	15.7	+1.0
Majority		1,264	25.1	+7.2
Turnout		5,027	48.3	+3.8
Conservative hold		Swing	Labour to Con 3.6	

=== Blackrod ward ===
Blackrod ward
Party	Candidate	Votes	%	±%
Labour	K Helsby	1,646	37.0	−9.0
Conservative	J Barrow	1,533	34.4	−0.9
SDP	C Kay	806	18.1	+5.1
Independent Labour	L Watkinson	467	10.5	+4.8
Majority		113	2.5	−12.5
Turnout		4,452	46.4	+9.2
Labour hold		Swing	Labour to SDP 7.0	

=== Bradshaw ward ===
Bradshaw ward
Party	Candidate	Votes	%	±%
Conservative	E Crook	2,537	55.5	+6.8
Labour	P McFadden	1,068	23.4	−5.0
Liberal	A Steele	966	21.1	−1.9
Majority		1,469	32.1	+11.8
Turnout		4,571	42.0	+1.0
Conservative hold		Swing	Labour to Con 5.9	

=== Breightmet ward ===
Breightmet ward
Party	Candidate	Votes	%	±%
Labour	D Grime	2,185	48.3	−4.8
Conservative	P Jones	1,626	35.9	+3.8
SDP	B Dunning	578	15.8	+1.0
Majority		559	12.3	−8.7
Turnout		4,527	40.9	+6.1
Labour hold		Swing	Labour to Con 4.3	

=== Bromley Cross ward ===
Bromley Cross ward
Party	Candidate	Votes	%	±%
Conservative	A Wilkinson	2,665	54.3	+12.0
Labour	D Doxsey	1,236	25.2	−3.9
SDP	D Poole	1,010	20.6	−8.1
Majority		1,429	29.1	+16.0
Turnout		4,911	46.7	+2.6
Conservative hold		Swing	SDP to Con 10.0	

=== Burnden ward ===
Burnden ward
Party	Candidate	Votes	%	±%
Labour	P Birch	2,041	52.4	−2.1
Conservative	F Hunter	1,299	33.3	+0.9
Liberal	P Howarth	558	14.3	+1.2
Majority		742	19.0	−3.0
Turnout		3,898	43.6	+4.6
Labour hold		Swing	Labour to Liberal 1.6	

=== Central ward ===
Central ward
Party	Candidate	Votes	%	±%
Labour	J Sherrington	2,257	67.7	−7.0
Liberal	S Vickers	682	20.5	+3.3
Conservative	N Baxter	392	11.8	+3.8
Majority		1,575	47.3	−6.9
Turnout		3,331	41.3	+0.9
Labour hold		Swing	Labour to Liberal 5.4	

=== Daubhill ward ===
Daubhill ward
Party	Candidate	Votes	%	±%
Labour	M Donaghy	2,308	56.9	−7.4
Conservative	J Cosgrove	1,234	30.4	+6.2
Liberal	R Ronson	439	10.6	−1.0
Independent	J Hamilton	82	2.0	+2.0
Majority		1,074	26.5	−13.6
Turnout		4,055	44.2	+4.6
Labour hold		Swing	Labour to Con 6.8	

=== Deane-cum-Heaton ward ===
Deane-cum-Heaton ward
Party	Candidate	Votes	%	±%
Conservative	J Hanscomb	3,484	58.4	+4.3
Labour	P Boardman	1,288	21.6	−2.8
SDP	C Macpherson	1,193	20.0	−1.5
Majority		2,196	36.8	+7.1
Turnout		5,965	45.5	+3.5
Conservative hold		Swing	Labour to Con 2.5	

=== Derby ward ===
Derby ward
Party	Candidate	Votes	%	±%
Labour	K Peters	3,123	72.8	−9.7
Conservative	W Ingham	731	17.0	+6.4
SDP	L Easterman	436	10.2	+3.3
Majority		2,392	55.7	−16.2
Turnout		4,290	44.0	+4.4
Labour hold		Swing	Labour to Con 8.0	

=== Farnworth ward ===
Farnworth ward
Party	Candidate	Votes	%	±%
Labour	W Hardman	2,230	65.1	−2.5
Conservative	C Adams	700	20.4	+7.0
Liberal	L Sanderson	493	14.4	−4.7
Majority		1,530	44.7	−3.8
Turnout		3,423	36.0	+6.2
Labour hold		Swing	Liberal to Con 5.8	

=== Halliwell ward ===
Halliwell ward
Party	Candidate	Votes	%	±%
Labour	C Morris	2,282	50.1	+3.1
Liberal	A Halliwell	1,226	26.9	−9.3
Conservative	E Holland	1,049	23.0	+6.2
Majority		1,056	23.2	+12.4
Turnout		4,557	46.3	+2.6
Labour hold		Swing	Liberal to Con 7.7	

=== Harper Green ward ===
Harper Green ward
Party	Candidate	Votes	%	±%
Labour	M Atkinson	2,479	59.3	−10.2
Conservative	L Cosgrave	885	21.2	+2.9
Liberal	G Willis	817	19.5	+7.3
Majority		1,594	38.1	−13.0
Turnout		4,181	40.6	+7.0
Labour hold		Swing	Labour to Liberal 8.7	

=== Horwich ward ===
Horwich ward
Party	Candidate	Votes	%	±%
Labour	E McCracken	2,309	38.8	+2.5
Liberal	I Hamilton	1,916	32.2	−5.7
Conservative	S Dawson	1,725	29.0	+3.1
Majority		393	6.6	
Turnout		5,950	53.0	+5.6
Labour hold		Swing	Liberal to Con 4.4	

=== Hulton Park ward ===
Hulton Park ward
Party	Candidate	Votes	%	±%
Conservative	G Smith	2,267	42.9	+6.1
Liberal	P Cooper	1,961	37.1	−2.6
Labour	P Entwistle	1,053	19.9	−3.7
Majority		306	5.8	
Turnout		5,281	48.3	+8.1
Conservative hold		Swing	Labour to Con 4.9	

=== Kearsley ward ===
Kearsley ward
Party	Candidate	Votes	%	±%
Labour	W Robinson	2,210	49.2	−1.7
Liberal	J Rothwell	1,595	35.5	−3.9
Conservative	N Houlcroft	687	15.3	+5.6
Majority		615	13.7	+2.2
Turnout		4,492	46.2	+6.1
Labour hold		Swing	Liberal to Con 4.7	

=== Little Lever ward ===
Little Lever ward
Party	Candidate	Votes	%	±%
Conservative	D Dziubas	2,229	50.2	+4.3
Labour	S Jones	1,580	35.6	−7.8
SDP	K Banks	632	14.2	+3.6
Majority		649	14.6	+12.1
Turnout		4,441	47.6	+0.8
Conservative hold		Swing	Labour to Con 6.0	

=== Smithills ward ===
Smithills ward
Party	Candidate	Votes	%	±%
Liberal	F Harasiwka	2,376	48.4	−1.4
Conservative	C Shaw	1,899	38.7	+3.8
Labour	J Ward	631	12.9	−0.4
Majority		477	9.7	−4.9
Turnout		4,906	54.9	+8.0
Liberal gain from Conservative		Swing	Liberal to Con 2.6	

=== Tonge ward ===
Tonge ward
Party	Candidate	Votes	%	±%
Labour	D Clare	2,317	53.6	−10.7
Conservative	T Ryle	1,438	33.2	+4.5
SDP	L Shepherd	570	13.2	+6.2
Majority		879	20.3	−17.6
Turnout		4,325	47.3	+1.0
Labour hold		Swing	Labour to Liberal 8.6	

=== Westhoughton ward ===
Westhoughton ward
Party	Candidate	Votes	%	±%
Labour	P Finch	1,228	35.8	−4.3
Liberal	P Mather	1,170	34.1	−3.6
Conservative	J Cowburn	769	22.4	+0.2
Independent	P James	262	7.6	+7.6
Majority		58	1.7	−0.7
Turnout		3,429	50.2	+9.2
Labour hold		Swing	Labour to Con 2.2	
