= 1999 Bolton Metropolitan Borough Council election =

1999 UK local election

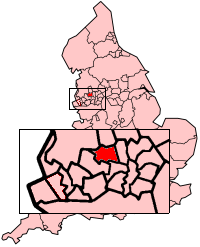
The Metropolitan Borough of Bolton shown within England

Elections to Bolton Metropolitan Borough Council were held on 6 May 1999. One third of the council was up for election and the Labour Party kept overall control of the council.

20 seats were contested in the election, with 11 being won by the Labour Party, 5 by the Liberal Democrats and 4 by the Conservatives.

After the election, the composition of the council was:

- Labour 41
- Conservative 10
- Liberal Democrat 9

== Election result ==
Bolton local election result 1999
| Party | Seats | Gains | Losses | Net gain/loss | Seats % | Votes % | Votes | +/− |
|---|---|---|---|---|---|---|---|---|
| Labour | 11 | 0 | 6 | -6 | 55.0 | 46.4 | 23,459 | -0.8 |
| Liberal Democrats | 5 | 4 | 0 | +4 | 25.0 | 21.0 | 10,634 | +1.5 |
| Conservative | 4 | 2 | 0 | +2 | 20.0 | 30.6 | 15,497 | +0.3 |
| Other parties | 0 | 0 | 0 | +0 | 0 | 2.0 | 999 | -1.0 |

== Council Composition ==
Prior to the election the composition of the council was:

↓
| 47 | 8 | 5 |
| Labour | Conservative | L |

After the election the composition of the council was:

↓
| 41 | 10 | 9 |
| Labour | Conservative | L |

LD – Liberal Democrats

== Ward results ==
=== Astley Bridge ward ===
Astley Bridge ward
| Party | Candidate | Votes | % | ±% |
|---|---|---|---|---|
| Conservative | S Lever | 1,676 | 48.4 | −0.6 |
| Labour | S Murray | 1,546 | 44.5 | +1.6 |
| Liberal Democrats | C Atty | 247 | 7.1 | −0.9 |
| Majority | | 133 | 3.8 | −2.3 |
| Turnout | | 3,472 | 31.0 | −1.6 |
| Conservative gain from Labour | | Swing | LD to Labour 1.2 | |

=== Blackrod ward ===
Blackrod ward
| Party | Candidate | Votes | % | ±% |
|---|---|---|---|---|
| Labour | K Helsby | 1,111 | 45.0 | +6.3 |
| Conservative | R Barrow | 896 | 36.3 | +7.2 |
| Liberal Democrats | D Watts | 462 | 18.7 | +8.2 |
| Majority | | 215 | 8.7 | −8.3 |
| Turnout | | 2,469 | 24.0 | −1.1 |
| Labour hold | | Swing | | |

=== Bradshaw ward ===
Bradshaw ward
| Party | Candidate | Votes | % | ±% |
|---|---|---|---|---|
| Conservative | W Hall | 1,585 | 49.1 | +4.9 |
| Labour | P Fitzpatrick | 1,265 | 39.2 | −4.9 |
| Liberal Democrats | S Howarth | 377 | 11.7 | +0.1 |
| Majority | | 320 | 9.9 | +9.7 |
| Turnout | | 3,227 | 29.0 | +3.2 |
| Conservative gain from Labour | | Swing | Labour to Con 4.9 | |

=== Breightmet ward ===
Breightmet ward
| Party | Candidate | Votes | % | ±% |
|---|---|---|---|---|
| Labour | D Grime | 1,071 | 60.1 | +0.4 |
| Conservative | P Brierley | 468 | 26.3 | −2.9 |
| Liberal Democrats | E Hill | 242 | 13.6 | +2.5 |
| Majority | | 603 | 33.8 | +3.3 |
| Turnout | | 1,781 | 17.0 | −2.2 |
| Labour hold | | Swing | Con to LD 2.7 | |

=== Bromley Cross ward ===
Bromley Cross ward
| Party | Candidate | Votes | % | ±% |
|---|---|---|---|---|
| Conservative | A Wilkinson | 2,870 | 58.3 | −2.1 |
| Labour | A Muscat | 1,172 | 32.7 | +1.7 |
| Liberal Democrats | S Ball | 323 | 9.0 | +0.4 |
| Majority | | 914 | 25.5 | −3.9 |
| Turnout | | 3,581 | 32.0 | +1.0 |
| Conservative hold | | Swing | Con to Labour 1.9 | |

=== Burnden ward ===
Burnden ward
| Party | Candidate | Votes | % | ±% |
|---|---|---|---|---|
| Labour | P Birch | 1,307 | 69.1 | +2.8 |
| Conservative | R Wood | 361 | 19.1 | −0.3 |
| Liberal Democrats | D Connor | 223 | 11.8 | −2.5 |
| Majority | | 946 | 50.0 | +3.2 |
| Turnout | | 1,891 | 20.0 | +0.7 |
| Labour hold | | Swing | LD to Labour 2.6 | |

=== Central ward ===
Central ward
| Party | Candidate | Votes | % | ±% |
|---|---|---|---|---|
| Labour | L Byrne | 1,358 | 67.4 | −1.2 |
| Conservative | L Beresford | 468 | 23.2 | +2.4 |
| Liberal Democrats | M Eidlow | 114 | 5.7 | −0.7 |
| Socialist Labour | L Lowe | 76 | 3.8 | +3.8 |
| Majority | | 890 | 44.1 | −3.7 |
| Turnout | | 2,016 | 24.0 | −1.1 |
| Labour hold | | Swing | Labour to Soc Lab 2.5 | |

=== Daubhill ward ===
Daubhill ward
| Party | Candidate | Votes | % | ±% |
|---|---|---|---|---|
| Labour | D Barlow | 1,123 | 67.9 | +4.7 |
| Conservative | J Walsh | 377 | 22.8 | +0.7 |
| Liberal Democrats | L Greensits | 153 | 9.3 | −1.6 |
| Majority | | 746 | 45.1 | +3.9 |
| Turnout | | 1,653 | 18.0 | −0.9 |
| Labour hold | | Swing | LD to Labour 3.1 | |

=== Deane-cum-Heaton ward ===
Deane-cum-Heaton ward
| Party | Candidate | Votes | % | ±% |
|---|---|---|---|---|
| Conservative | J Hanscomb | 2,150 | 58.1 | +0.9 |
| Labour | A Zaman | 1,035 | 28.0 | −3.1 |
| Liberal Democrats | I Greenhalgh | 517 | 14.0 | +2.3 |
| Majority | | 1,115 | 30.1 | +3.3 |
| Turnout | | 3,702 | 27.0 | −1.8 |
| Conservative hold | | Swing | Labour to LD 2.7 | |

=== Derby ward ===
Derby ward
| Party | Candidate | Votes | % | ±% |
|---|---|---|---|---|
| Labour | R Kay | 1,819 | 77.4 | −1.3 |
| Conservative | F Taylor | 387 | 16.5 | +2.8 |
| Liberal Democrats | L Bale | 143 | 6.1 | −0.6 |
| Majority | | 1432 | 61.0 | −4.0 |
| Turnout | | 2,349 | 24.0 | −0.3 |
| Labour hold | | Swing | Labour to Con 2.0 | |

=== Farnworth ward ===
Farnworth ward
| Party | Candidate | Votes | % | ±% |
|---|---|---|---|---|
| Labour | R Stones | 943 | 65.7 | +2.2 |
| Liberal Democrats | M Rothwell | 210 | 14.6 | +0.8 |
| Conservative | W Woodward | 177 | 12.3 | −0.3 |
| Socialist Labour | W Kelly | 105 | 7.3 | −2.7 |
| Majority | | 733 | 51.1 | +0.5 |
| Turnout | | 1,435 | 15.0 | −0.2 |
| Labour hold | | Swing | Soc Lab to Labour 2.4 | |

=== Halliwell ward ===
Halliwell ward
| Party | Candidate | Votes | % | ±% |
|---|---|---|---|---|
| Labour | C Morris | 1,362 | 58.7 | −5.0 |
| Conservative | J Coombs | 524 | 22.6 | +3.1 |
| Liberal Democrats | A Karen | 319 | 13.7 | −3.1 |
| Socialist Labour | H Broadbent | 117 | 5.0 | +5.0 |
| Majority | | 838 | 36.1 | −8.1 |
| Turnout | | 2,322 | 24.0 | +1.3 |
| Labour hold | | Swing | Labour to Soc Labour 5.0 | |

=== Harper Green ward ===
Harper Green ward
| Party | Candidate | Votes | % | ±% |
|---|---|---|---|---|
| Labour | C Dennis | 1,105 | 65.2 | +1.3 |
| Conservative | S Kesler | 272 | 16.1 | −0.7 |
| Liberal Democrats | W Connor | 211 | 12.5 | +2.8 |
| Socialist Labour | W Kelly | 106 | 6.3 | −3.3 |
| Majority | | 833 | 49.2 | +2.1 |
| Turnout | | 1,694 | 16.0 | +0.5 |
| Labour hold | | Swing | Soc Lab to LD 3.0 | |

=== Horwich ward ===
Horwich ward
| Party | Candidate | Votes | % | ±% |
|---|---|---|---|---|
| Liberal Democrats | P McGeehan | 1,345 | 39.6 | −15.4 |
| Labour | B McCracken | 1,321 | 38.9 | +10.7 |
| Conservative | E Perks | 734 | 21.6 | +4.8 |
| Majority | | 24 | 0.7 | −26.2 |
| Turnout | | 3,400 | 29.0 | −2.0 |
| Liberal Democrats gain from Labour | | Swing | LD to Labour 13.0 | |

=== Hulton Park ward ===
Hulton Park ward
| Party | Candidate | Votes | % | ±% |
|---|---|---|---|---|
| Liberal Democrats | D Gradwell | 1,079 | 35.2 | +25.7 |
| Labour | B Ramsden | 1,051 | 34.3 | −14.1 |
| Conservative | A Walsh | 934 | 30.5 | −0.1 |
| Majority | | 28 | 0.9 | |
| Turnout | | 3,064 | 24.0 | −0.1 |
| Liberal Democrats gain from Labour | | Swing | Labour to LD 19.9 | |

=== Kearsley ward ===
Kearsley ward
| Party | Candidate | Votes | % | ±% |
|---|---|---|---|---|
| Liberal Democrats | J Rothwell | 1,239 | 49.1 | +3.6 |
| Labour | S Keating | 1,120 | 44.4 | −1.5 |
| Conservative | J Tyler | 163 | 6.5 | −2.2 |
| Majority | | 119 | 4.7 | |
| Turnout | | 2,522 | 24.0 | +2.3 |
| Liberal Democrats gain from Labour | | Swing | Con to LD 2.9 | |

=== Little Lever ward ===
Little Lever ward
| Party | Candidate | Votes | % | ±% |
|---|---|---|---|---|
| Labour | R Evans | 1,360 | 51.8 | −6.4 |
| Conservative | D Bailey | 993 | 37.9 | +4.7 |
| Liberal Democrats | W Crook | 270 | 10.3 | +1.9 |
| Majority | | 367 | 14.0 | −11.0 |
| Turnout | | 2,623 | 28.0 | +0.5 |
| Labour hold | | Swing | Labour to Con 5.5 | |

=== Smithills ward ===
Smithills ward
| Party | Candidate | Votes | % | ±% |
|---|---|---|---|---|
| Liberal Democrats | J Higson | 1,516 | 61.0 | −0.5 |
| Labour | S Hynes | 488 | 19.6 | −1.2 |
| Conservative | D Bagnall | 481 | 19.4 | +1.7 |
| Majority | | 1,028 | 41.4 | +0.7 |
| Turnout | | 2,485 | 29.0 | −3.1 |
| Liberal Democrats hold | | Swing | Labour to Con 1.4 | |

=== Tonge ward ===
Tonge ward
| Party | Candidate | Votes | % | ±% |
|---|---|---|---|---|
| Labour | E Sherrington | 1,135 | 46.1 | −20.6 |
| Independent Labour | P Perry | 595 | 24.2 | +24.2 |
| Conservative | D Brierley | 569 | 23.1 | −2.1 |
| Liberal Democrats | M Langdon | 162 | 6.6 | −1.5 |
| Majority | | 540 | 21.9 | −19.5 |
| Turnout | | 2,461 | 30.0 | +1.7 |
| Labour hold | | Swing | Labour to Ind Lab 22.4 | |

=== Westhoughton ward ===
Westhoughton ward
| Party | Candidate | Votes | % | ±% |
|---|---|---|---|---|
| Liberal Democrats | D Wilkinson | 1,482 | 60.6 | +17.3 |
| Labour | P Finch | 767 | 31.4 | −12.9 |
| Conservative | S Wallen | 197 | 8.1 | −4.3 |
| Majority | | 715 | 29.2 | |
| Turnout | | 2,446 | 26.0 | +4.2 |
| Liberal Democrats gain from Labour | | Swing | Labour to LD 15.1 | |

== Sources ==
=== References ===
- Rallings, Colin; Thrasher, Michael. "Bolton Metropolitan Borough Council Election Results 1973–2012" (PDF). The Elections Centre. The Elections Centre, Plymouth University.
