= 2008 Bolton Metropolitan Borough Council election =

2008 UK local government election

Results of the 2008 Bolton Metropolitan Borough Council election

Elections to Bolton Metropolitan Borough Council were held on 1 May 2008. One third of the council was up for election and the council stayed under no overall control.

20 seats were contested with 9 being won by the Conservatives, 7 by the Labour Party and 4 by the Liberal Democrats.

Overall turnout was 35.03%.

After the election, the composition of the council was

- Labour 27
- Conservative 23
- Liberal Democrat 9
- Independent 1

== Election result ==
Bolton local election result 2008
Party	Seats	Gains	Losses	Net gain/loss	Seats %	Votes %	Votes	+/−
Labour	7	1	0	+1		32.4	22,644	-4.1
Conservative	9	2	1	+1		41.9	29,254	+2.1
Liberal Democrats	4	0	2	-2		20.4	14,221	+0.7
Green	0	0	0	0	0	2.5	1,751	-0.7
BNP	0	0	0	0	0	1.2	867	+0.4
You Party	0	0	0	0	0	0.9	637	+0.9
Left Alternative	0	0	0	0	0	0.6	444	+0.6
Independent	0	0	0	0	0	0.1	104	+0.1

== Council Composition ==
Prior to the election the composition of the council was:

↓
26	22	12
Labour	Conservative	Lib Dems

After the election the composition of the council was:

↓
28	23	9
Labour	Conservative	Lib Dems

== Ward results ==
=== Astley Bridge ward ===
Astley Bridge ward
Party	Candidate	Votes	%	±%
Conservative	Hilary Fairclough	2,358	64.4	+6.7
Liberal Democrats	Clive Atty	733	20.0	+1.5
Labour	Muhammad Rafiq	572	15.6	−8.2
Majority		1,625	44.4	+10.6
Turnout		3,663	36.0	+2.5
Conservative hold		Swing	Labour to Con 7.4	

=== Bradshaw ward ===
Bradshaw ward
Party	Candidate	Votes	%	±%
Conservative	Walter Hall	2,535	68.7	+3.2
Labour	Jim Cottam	620	16.8	−0.5
Liberal Democrats	Lauren Alergant	342	9.3	−3.2
Green	Anne Mumberson	195	5.3	+0.6
Majority		1,915	51.9	+3.8
Turnout		3,692	40.7	+1.9
Conservative hold		Swing	LD to Con 3.2	

=== Breightmet ward ===
Breightmet ward
Party	Candidate	Votes	%	±%
Conservative	Arthur Norris	1,696	47.1	+6.2
Labour	William Gallagher	1,182	32.8	−15.5
BNP	Carl Hemmings	350	9.7	+9.7
Liberal Democrats	Stephen Howarth	163	4.5	−2.5
You Party	Norma Armston	137	3.8	+3.8
Green	Lynne Hyland	74	2.1	−1.9
Majority		514	14.3	
Turnout		3,602	36.6	+2.0
Conservative hold		Swing	Labour to BNP 12.6	

=== Bromley Cross ward ===
Bromley Cross ward
Party	Candidate	Votes	%	±%
Conservative	Alan Wilkinson	2,933	68.9	+2.2
Labour	Jeremy Foster	705	16.6	+0.4
Liberal Democrats	David Wibberley	331	7.8	−0.9
Green	Liz Spencer	147	3.5	−4.9
You Party	Andy Openshaw	141	3.3	+3.3
Majority		2,228	52.3	+1.8
Turnout		4,257	40.8	+1.2
Conservative hold		Swing	Green to Con 3.5	

=== Crompton ward ===
Crompton ward
Party	Candidate	Votes	%	±%
Labour	Hanif Darvesh	1,985	50.0	−2.3
Conservative	John Partington	1,113	28.0	−4.6
Liberal Democrats	Yakub Khoda	873	22.0	+6.8
Majority		872	21.9	+2.2
Turnout		3,971	38.8	+8.1
Labour hold		Swing	Labour to LD 5.7	

=== Farnworth ward ===
Farnworth ward
Party	Candidate	Votes	%	±%
Labour	Jim Lord	1,151	41.5	−1.0
Liberal Democrats	Tariq Aziz	955	34.4	−0.9
Conservative	Michelle Ionn	531	19.1	+3.8
You Party	Andy Allen	138	5.0	+5.0
Majority		196	7.1	−0.1
Turnout		2,775	25.4	+1.4
Labour hold		Swing	Labour to Con 2.4	

=== Great Lever ward ===
Great Lever ward
Party	Candidate	Votes	%	±%
Labour	Mohammed Iqbal	1,657	46.3	−0.8
Conservative	Mudasir Dean	1,299	36.3	−1.2
Green	Alan Johnson	374	10.5	+4.1
Liberal Democrats	Mian Akhtar	245	6.9	−2.1
Majority		358	10.0	+0.5
Turnout		3,575	36.5	+1.6
Labour gain from Conservative		Swing	LD to Green 3.1	

=== Halliwell ward ===
Halliwell ward
Party	Candidate	Votes	%	±%
Labour	Cliff Morris	1,875	62.5	−2.3
Conservative	Shahid Mahmood	632	21.1	+2.5
Liberal Democrats	Riaz Gul	494	16.5	−0.1
Majority		1,243	41.4	−4.8
Turnout		3,001	31.6	+3.1
Labour hold		Swing	Labour to Con 2.4	

=== Harper Green ward ===
Harper Green ward
Party	Candidate	Votes	%	±%
Labour	Champak Mistry	1,181	44.7	−6.2
Conservative	Bill Dawson	1,071	40.5	+9.5
Liberal Democrats	David Connor	390	14.8	−3.3
Majority		110	4.2	−15.7
Turnout		2,642	26.7	+3.3
Labour hold		Swing	Labour to Con 7.8	

=== Heaton and Lostock ward ===
Heaton and Lostock ward
Party	Candidate	Votes	%	±%
Conservative	Alan Rushton	3,378	70.6	+1.7
Labour	John Gillatt	831	17.4	−2.1
Liberal Democrats	Jonathan Evans	326	6.8	−4.8
Green	Daniel Mann	249	5.2	+5.2
Majority		2,547	53.2	+9.3
Turnout		4,784	45.3	+1.4
Conservative hold		Swing	LD to Green 5.0	

=== Horwich and Blackrod ward ===
Horwich and Blackrod ward
Party	Candidate	Votes	%	±%
Conservative	Pat Barrow	1,469	43.7	+2.5
Labour	Kevan Jones	1,021	30.4	−5.7
Liberal Democrats	Ian Hamilton	869	25.9	+3.2
Majority		448	13.3	+8.2
Turnout		3,359	35.0	−1.4
Conservative gain from Liberal Democrats		Swing	Labour to LD 4.4	

=== Horwich North East ward ===
Horwich North East ward
Party	Candidate	Votes	%	±%
Liberal Democrats	Barbara Ronson	1,615	44.0	−5.8
Conservative	Stephen Wallen	1,126	30.7	+2.1
Labour	Kevin McKeon	832	22.7	+1.0
You Party	Lucy Openshaw	95	2.6	+2.6
Majority		489	13.3	−7.9
Turnout		3,678	37.2	+0.4
Liberal Democrats hold		Swing	LD to Con 3.9	

=== Hulton ward ===
Hulton ward
Party	Candidate	Votes	%	±%
Conservative	Alan Walsh	1,822	54.2	+1.7
Labour	Paul Fitzpatrick	1,118	33.3	−0.5
Liberal Democrats	Linden Greensitt	421	12.5	−1.2
Majority		704	20.9	+2.2
Turnout		3,361	34.0	+1.8
Conservative hold		Swing	LD to Con 1.4	

=== Kearsley ward ===
Kearsley ward
Party	Candidate	Votes	%	±%
Liberal Democrats	John Rothwell	1,435	46.6	+4.2
Labour	Guy Harkin	1,052	34.2	−7.3
Conservative	Diane Bamber	593	19.3	+2.1
Majority		383	12.4	+11.5
Turnout		3,094	29.8	+1.4
Liberal Democrats hold		Swing	Labour to LD 5.7	

=== Little Lever and Darcy Lever ward ===
Little Lever and Darcy Lever ward
Party	Candidate	Votes	%	±%
Conservative	Mary Woodward	1,726	45.5	+3.2
Labour	Jesamine Kay	1,408	37.1	−6.1
Liberal Democrats	Eric Hyde	418	11.0	+2.6
Green	Alwynne Cartmell	243	6.4	−0.7
Majority		318	8.4	
Turnout		3,795	38.7	−1.1
Conservative hold		Swing	Labour to Con 4.6	

=== Rumworth ward ===
Conservative candidate for Rumworth, Zahid Raja, withdrew before the election.

Rumworth ward
Party	Candidate	Votes	%	±%
Labour	Rosa Kay	1,875	63.2	−1.2
Liberal Democrats	Wendy Connor	647	21.8	+6.9
Left List	Neil McAlister	444	15.0	+15.0
Majority		1,228	41.4	−2.3
Turnout		2,966	29.3	−1.8
Labour hold		Swing		

=== Smithills ward ===
Smithills ward
Party	Candidate	Votes	%	±%
Liberal Democrats	Roger Hayes	1,784	46.6	−1.0
Conservative	Christine Flanigan	1,216	31.8	+3.6
Labour	Christopher Peacock	599	15.6	−2.8
Green	Rachel Mann	136	3.6	−2.3
You Party	Doug Bagnall	94	2.5	+2.5
Majority		568	14.8	−4.6
Turnout		3,829	37.9	+1.2
Liberal Democrats hold		Swing	Labour to Con 3.2	

=== Tonge with the Haulgh ward ===
Tonge with the Haulgh ward
Party	Candidate	Votes	%	±%
Labour	Frank White	1,289	40.3	−4.6
Conservative	Nigel Ford	1,109	34.7	+9.2
BNP	David Wood	517	15.8	−0.3
Liberal Democrats	Paul Harasiwka	194	6.1	−1.1
Green	James Tomkinson	68	2.1	−2.0
You Party	Ryan Barlow	32	1.0	+1.0
Majority		180	5.6	−13.8
Turnout		3,199	34.5	−0.1
Labour hold		Swing	Labour to Con 6.9	

=== Weshoughton North and Chew Moor ward ===
Weshoughton North and Chew Moor ward
Party	Candidate	Votes	%	±%
Conservative	Christine Wild	1,700	47.6	+5.7
Labour	Mike Francis	874	24.5	−9.9
Liberal Democrats	Derek Gradwell	858	24.0	+5.6
Green	Laura Spencer	141	3.9	−1.4
Majority		826	23.1	+15.7
Turnout		3,573	33.2	−0.5
Conservative gain from Liberal Democrats		Swing	Labour to Con 6.9	

=== Weshoughton South ward ===
Weshoughton South ward
Party	Candidate	Votes	%	±%
Liberal Democrats	David Wilkinson	1,128	36.2	+10.7
Conservative	Lynda Winrow	947	30.4	+1.7
Labour	Harry Bowling	817	26.2	−9.8
Green	Eric Hyland	124	4.0	−5.8
Independent	Ainslie Casson	104	3.3	+3.3
Majority		181	5.8	
Turnout		3,120	32.3	+2.3
Liberal Democrats hold		Swing	Labour to LD 10.2	

== Sources ==
=== References ===
- Rallings, Colin; Thrasher, Michael. "Bolton Metropolitan Borough Council Election Results 1973–2012" (PDF). The Elections Centre. The Elections Centre, Plymouth University.
