= 2012 Bolton Metropolitan Borough Council election =

2012 UK local government election

Results of the 2012 Bolton Metropolitan Borough Council election

Elections to Bolton Metropolitan Borough Council were held on 3 May 2012. One third of the council was up for election, with each successful candidate to serve a four-year term of office, expiring in 2016.

22 seats were contested, including all 3 Bradshaw seats, following the resignation of Conservative married couple, Diane and Paul Brierley. The Labour Party won 14 seats, whilst the Conservatives won 7 seats and the Liberal Democrats 1 seat.

After the election, the composition of the council was as follows:

- Labour 41
- Conservative 16
- Liberal Democrats 3

== Election result ==
Bolton local election result 2012
| Party | Seats | Gains | Losses | Net gain/loss | Seats % | Votes % | Votes | +/− |
|---|---|---|---|---|---|---|---|---|
| Labour | 14 | 6 | 0 | +6 | | 50.0 | 34,520 | +0.7 |
| Conservative | 5 | 0 | 4 | -4 | | 31.3 | 21,587 | -1.9 |
| Liberal Democrats | 1 | 0 | 2 | -2 | | 12.2 | 8,431 | -0.7 |
| Green | 0 | 0 | 0 | 0 | | 4.2 | 2,929 | +0.6 |
| English Democrat | 0 | 0 | 0 | 0 | | 0.8 | 588 | +0.8 |
| BNP | 0 | 0 | 0 | 0 | | 0.4 | 260 | -0.0 |
| Independent | 0 | 0 | 0 | 0 | | 1.1 | 754 | +0.2 |

== Council Composition ==
Prior to the election the composition of the council was:

↓
| 35 | 20 | 5 |
| Labour | Conservative | L |

After the election the composition of the council was:

↓
| 41 | 16 | 3 |
| Labour | Conservative | L |

L – Liberal Democrats

== Ward results ==
=== Astley Bridge ward ===
Astley Bridge ward
| Party | Candidate | Votes | % | ±% |
|---|---|---|---|---|
| Conservative | Hilary Constance Fairclough | 1,653 | 46.5 | +0.4 |
| Labour | Stuart William Murray | 1,453 | 40.8 | +6.3 |
| Independent | Neville Mercer | 334 | 9.4 | +4.7 |
| Liberal Democrats | Clive Richard Atty | 116 | 3.3 | −1.4 |
| Majority | | 200 | 5.6 | −6.0 |
| Turnout | | 3,556 | 35.4 | −7.5 |
| Conservative hold | | Swing | LD to Labour 3.8 | |

=== Bradshaw ward ===
All three seats were up for election. Dean stood again for election in 2014, Haslam in 2015, and Hall in 2016.

Bradshaw ward
| Party | Candidate | Votes | % | ±% |
|---|---|---|---|---|
| Conservative | Walter Hall | 1,957 | 20.3 | |
| Conservative | Stuart Haslam | 1,948 | 20.2 | |
| Conservative | Mudasir Dean | 1,584 | 16.5 | |
| Labour | Steve Rigby | 1,035 | 10.8 | |
| Labour | Deborah Susan Newall | 1,031 | 10.7 | |
| Labour | Asha Ali Ismail | 906 | 9.4 | |
| Liberal Democrats | Stephen Frederick Howarth | 447 | 4.6 | |
| Liberal Democrats | Norman Peacock | 424 | 4.4 | |
| Liberal Democrats | Gabrielle McDowall | 291 | 3.0 | |
| Majority | | (Hall) 922 | | |
| Majority | | (Haslam) 913 | | |
| Majority | | (Dean) 549 | | |
| Conservative hold | | | | |
| Conservative hold | | | | |
| Conservative hold | | | | |

=== Breightmet ward ===
Breightmet ward
| Party | Candidate | Votes | % | ±% |
|---|---|---|---|---|
| Labour | Kate Challender | 1,813 | 59.8 | −0.4 |
| Conservative | Arthur Norris | 904 | 29.8 | −4.8 |
| Green | Laura Diggle | 208 | 6.9 | +6.9 |
| Liberal Democrats | Tracey Odessa Kane | 106 | 3.5 | −1.7 |
| Majority | | 909 | 30.0 | +4.6 |
| Turnout | | 3,031 | 32.5 | −3.5 |
| Labour gain from Conservative | | Swing | Con to Green 5.8 | |

=== Bromley Cross ward ===
Bromley Cross ward
| Party | Candidate | Votes | % | ±% |
|---|---|---|---|---|
| Conservative | Alan Wilkinson | 2,207 | 59.0 | −0.7 |
| Labour | Tony Muscat | 1,215 | 32.5 | +6.2 |
| Liberal Democrats | Christopher Nathan Atty | 317 | 8.5 | +1.6 |
| Majority | | 992 | 26.5 | −6.7 |
| Turnout | | 3,739 | 35.6 | −9.4 |
| Conservative hold | | Swing | Con to Labour 3.4 | |

=== Crompton ward ===
Crompton ward
| Party | Candidate | Votes | % | ±% |
|---|---|---|---|---|
| Labour | Hanif Darvesh | 2,375 | 74.9 | +6.2 |
| Conservative | Ryan Patrick Haslam | 523 | 16.5 | −3.9 |
| Liberal Democrats | Anne Sanders Warren | 273 | 8.6 | +3.9 |
| Majority | | 1,852 | 58.4 | +10.4 |
| Turnout | | 3,171 | 31.9 | +4.0 |
| Labour hold | | Swing | Con to Labour 5.0 | |

=== Farnworth ward ===
Farnworth ward
| Party | Candidate | Votes | % | ±% |
|---|---|---|---|---|
| Labour | Asif Ibrahim | 1,557 | 67.2 | −1.6 |
| Conservative | Frederick Taylor | 320 | 13.8 | −0.4 |
| Green | Trevor Bonfield | 263 | 11.3 | +2.7 |
| Liberal Democrats | Wendy Connor | 178 | 7.7 | −0.7 |
| Majority | | 1,237 | 53.4 | −0.6 |
| Turnout | | 2,318 | 21.9 | −3.6 |
| Labour hold | | Swing | Labour to Green 2.1 | |

=== Great Lever ward ===
Great Lever ward
| Party | Candidate | Votes | % | ±% |
|---|---|---|---|---|
| Labour | Mohammed Iqbal | 2,183 | 74.0 | +5.5 |
| Green | David William Collins | 316 | 10.7 | +4.8 |
| Conservative | Albert Brandwood | 307 | 10.4 | −8.0 |
| Liberal Democrats | Philip Andrew Kane | 143 | 4.8 | −2.4 |
| Majority | | 1,867 | 63.3 | +13.8 |
| Turnout | | 2,949 | 30.7 | −4.8 |
| Labour hold | | Swing | Con to Labour 6.7 | |

=== Halliwell ward ===
Halliwell ward
| Party | Candidate | Votes | % | ±% |
|---|---|---|---|---|
| Labour | Cliff Morris | 2,122 | 78.4 | +2.6 |
| Conservative | Jolyon Horton Coombs | 254 | 9.4 | −3.4 |
| Green | Ian David McHugh | 227 | 8.4 | +1.8 |
| Liberal Democrats | Francine Godfrey | 103 | 3.8 | −1.0 |
| Majority | | 1,868 | 69.0 | +6.4 |
| Turnout | | 2,706 | 30.5 | −2.6 |
| Labour hold | | Swing | Con to Labour 3.0 | |

=== Harper Green ward ===
Harper Green ward
| Party | Candidate | Votes | % | ±% |
|---|---|---|---|---|
| Labour | Champak Gulab Mistry | 1,656 | 73.0 | +3.8 |
| Conservative | Robert Edward Tyler | 389 | 17.1 | −5.1 |
| Liberal Democrats | David Arthur Connor | 222 | 9.9 | +1.4 |
| Majority | | 1,267 | 58.9 | +13.7 |
| Turnout | | 2,267 | 23.7 | −6.3 |
| Labour hold | | Swing | Con to Labour 4.4 | |

=== Heaton and Lostock ward ===
Heaton and Lostock ward
| Party | Candidate | Votes | % | ±% |
|---|---|---|---|---|
| Conservative | Alan Rushston | 2,450 | 59.5 | −2.5 |
| Labour Co-op | John William Gillatt | 1,185 | 28.8 | +1.6 |
| Green | Hannah Middleton | 271 | 6.6 | +1.9 |
| Liberal Democrats | Christine Joyce Macpherson | 209 | 5.1 | −1.1 |
| Majority | | 1,265 | 30.7 | −3.9 |
| Turnout | | 4,115 | 39.1 | −9.4 |
| Conservative hold | | Swing | Con to Green 2.2 | |

=== Horwich and Blackrod ward ===
Horwich and Blackrod ward
| Party | Candidate | Votes | % | ±% |
|---|---|---|---|---|
| Labour | Ann Cunliffe | 1,693 | 57.4 | +8.3 |
| Conservative | Christine Deidre Flanigan | 836 | 28.3 | −9.5 |
| Green | Michael John Hillman | 233 | 7.9 | +0.5 |
| Liberal Democrats | Lynne McCartin | 187 | 6.3 | +0.6 |
| Majority | | 857 | 29.1 | +17.9 |
| Turnout | | 2,949 | 30.5 | −9.2 |
| Labour gain from Conservative | | Swing | Con to Labour 8.9 | |

=== Horwich North East ward ===
Horwich North East ward
| Party | Candidate | Votes | % | ±% |
|---|---|---|---|---|
| Labour Co-op | Richard Silvester | 1,495 | 43.6 | −1.1 |
| Liberal Democrats | Stephen Michael Rock | 661 | 19.3 | −10.1 |
| Conservative | Peter Sloan | 640 | 18.7 | −7.2 |
| Green | Graham Chadwick | 341 | 9.9 | +9.9 |
| English Democrat | Anthony Backhouse | 291 | 8.5 | +8.5 |
| Majority | | 834 | 24.3 | |
| Turnout | | 3,428 | 34.9 | |
| Labour Co-op hold | | Swing | Con to Green 10.1 | |

=== Hulton ward ===
Hulton ward
| Party | Candidate | Votes | % | ±% |
|---|---|---|---|---|
| Conservative | Alan Shepherd Walsh | 1,326 | 44.6 | −1.8 |
| Labour | Shafaqat Shaikh | 1,265 | 42.5 | +4.5 |
| Green | James Tomkinson | 322 | 10.8 | +1.2 |
| Liberal Democrats | Jaleh Salari | 61 | 2.0 | −4.0 |
| Majority | | 61 | 2.0 | −6.4 |
| Turnout | | 2,974 | 30.7 | −6.0 |
| Conservative hold | | Swing | LD to Labour 4.2 | |

=== Kearsley ward ===
Kearsley ward
| Party | Candidate | Votes | % | ±% |
|---|---|---|---|---|
| Labour | Carol Ann Burrows | 1,475 | 55.0 | +2.6 |
| Liberal Democrats | Margaret Patricia Rothwell | 909 | 33.9 | +3.3 |
| Conservative | Michelle Laura Ionn | 295 | 11.0 | −6.0 |
| Majority | | 566 | 21.1 | −0.4 |
| Turnout | | 2,679 | 26.0 | −4.2 |
| Labour gain from Liberal Democrats | | Swing | Con to LD 4.6 | |

=== Little Lever and Darcy Lever ward ===
Little Lever and Darcy Lever ward
| Party | Candidate | Votes | % | ±% |
|---|---|---|---|---|
| Labour | David Robert Evans | 1,524 | 44.3 | −5.7 |
| Conservative | Mary Elizabeth Woodward | 910 | 26.4 | −0.2 |
| Liberal Democrats | Eric John Hyde | 723 | 21.0 | +3.0 |
| Green | Alwynne Cartmell | 282 | 8.2 | +2.7 |
| Majority | | 614 | 17.8 | −5.5 |
| Turnout | | 3,439 | 36.0 | −5.2 |
| Labour gain from Conservative | | Swing | Labour to LD 4.3 | |

=== Rumworth ward ===
Rumworth ward
| Party | Candidate | Votes | % | ±% |
|---|---|---|---|---|
| Labour | Rosa Kay | 2,394 | 78.5 | +1.4 |
| Conservative | Jack Heyes | 294 | 9.6 | −1.2 |
| Green | Alan Johnson | 274 | 9.0 | +0.4 |
| Liberal Democrats | David Charles Cooper | 88 | 2.9 | −0.5 |
| Majority | | 2,100 | 68.8 | +2.4 |
| Turnout | | 3,050 | 30.7 | −3.9 |
| Labour hold | | Swing | Con to Labour 1.3 | |

=== Smithills ward ===
Smithills ward
| Party | Candidate | Votes | % | ±% |
|---|---|---|---|---|
| Liberal Democrats | Roger Geoffrey Hayes | 1,588 | 41.2 | +1.2 |
| Labour | Kevin Patrick Morris | 1,542 | 40.0 | +7.2 |
| Conservative | Kath Kavanagh | 535 | 13.9 | −8.4 |
| Green | Alex Shaw | 192 | 5.0 | +0.1 |
| Majority | | 46 | 1.2 | −6.0 |
| Turnout | | 3,857 | 39.4 | −2.2 |
| Liberal Democrats hold | | Swing | Con to Labour 7.8 | |

=== Tonge with the Haulgh ward ===
Tonge with the Haulgh ward
| Party | Candidate | Votes | % | ±% |
|---|---|---|---|---|
| Labour | Martin Donaghy | 1,679 | 63.0 | +7.8 |
| Conservative | Donna Hill | 618 | 23.2 | −6.8 |
| BNP | Dorothee Sayers | 260 | 9.7 | +0.1 |
| Liberal Democrats | Paul Anthony Harasiwka | 108 | 4.0 | −1.2 |
| Majority | | 1061 | 39.8 | +14.8 |
| Turnout | | 2,665 | 30.1 | −5.0 |
| Labour hold | | Swing | Con to Labour 7.3 | |

=== Westhoughton North and Chew Moor ward ===
Westhoughton North and Chew Moor ward
| Party | Candidate | Votes | % | ±% |
|---|---|---|---|---|
| Labour | Sean Francis Harkin | 1,672 | 46.4 | −1.4 |
| Conservative | Christine Wild | 1,264 | 35.0 | −8.1 |
| Independent | Jack Speight | 420 | 11.6 | +11.6 |
| Liberal Democrats | Derek John Gradwell | 250 | 6.9 | −2.3 |
| Majority | | 408 | 11.3 | +6.6 |
| Turnout | | 3,606 | 33.0 | −6.3 |
| Labour gain from Conservative | | Swing | Con to Ind 9.8 | |

=== Westhoughton South ward ===
Westhoughton South ward
| Party | Candidate | Votes | % | ±% |
|---|---|---|---|---|
| Labour | Anne-Marie Watters | 1,250 | 42.4 | −7.1 |
| Liberal Democrats | David Arthur Wilkinson | 1,027 | 34.8 | +10.6 |
| Conservative | Pat Allen | 373 | 12.6 | −11.9 |
| English Democrat | Derek John Bullock | 297 | 10.1 | +10.1 |
| Majority | | 223 | 7.6 | −18.6 |
| Turnout | | 2,947 | 30.8 | −6.3 |
| Labour gain from Liberal Democrats | | Swing | Con to LD 11.2 | |
