= 1991 Bolton Metropolitan Borough Council election =

1991 UK local government election

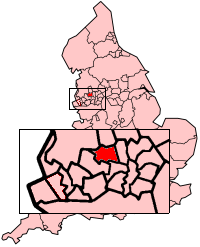
The Metropolitan Borough of Bolton shown within England

The 1991 Bolton Metropolitan Borough Council election took place on 2 May 1991 to elect members of Bolton Metropolitan Borough Council in Greater Manchester, England. One third of the council was up for election and the Labour Party kept overall control of the council.

20 seats were contested in the election: 12 were won by the Labour Party, 6 by the Conservative Party, 1 by the Liberal Democrats, and 1 by an Independent Labour candidate. After the election, the composition of the council was as follows:

- Labour 42
- Conservative 14
- Liberal Democrats 3
- Independent Labour 1

== Election results ==
Bolton local election result 1991
Party	Seats	Gains	Losses	Net gain/loss	Seats %	Votes %	Votes	+/−
Labour	12	0	1	-1		42.9	36,747	-12.4
Conservative	6	0	0	+0		34.9	29,841	+9.7
Liberal Democrats	1	0	0	+0		19.7	16,867	+5.1
Other parties	1	1	0	+1		2.5	2,140	-2.4

== Council composition ==
Prior to the election the composition of the council was:

↓
43	14	3
Labour	Conservative	L

After the election the composition of the council was:

↓
42	14	3	1
Labour	Conservative	L	I

LD – Liberal Democrats
I – Independent

== Ward results ==
=== Astley Bridge ward ===
Astley Bridge ward
Party	Candidate	Votes	%	±%
Conservative	J Walsh	3,072	55.0	+9.4
Labour	M Clare	1,981	35.5	−11.3
Liberal Democrats	C Kay	530	9.5	+1.9
Majority		1,092	19.5	
Turnout		5,583	50.3	−0.7
Conservative hold		Swing	Labour to Con 10.3	

=== Blackrod ward ===
Blackrod ward
Party	Candidate	Votes	%	±%
Labour	K Helsby	2,129	46.8	−18.4
Conservative	J Winnward	1,395	30.6	+7.4
Liberal Democrats	I Hamilton	810	17.8	+6.2
Independent	N Oliphant	220	4.8	+4.8
Majority		734	16.2	−25.8
Turnout		4,554	54.0	−4.2
Labour hold		Swing	Labour to Con 12.9	

=== Bradshaw ward ===
Bradshaw ward
Party	Candidate	Votes	%	±%
Conservative	E Crook	2,598	53.1	+9.6
Labour	J Byrne	1,668	34.1	−6.3
Liberal Democrats	R Steele	623	12.7	+3.7
Majority		930	19.0	+15.8
Turnout		4,889	44.0	+2.3
Conservative hold		Swing	Labour to Con 7.9	

=== Breightmet ward ===
Breightmet ward
Party	Candidate	Votes	%	±%
Labour	D Grime	2,320	55.6	−12.1
Conservative	J Edge	1,385	33.2	+7.9
Liberal Democrats	S Ball	468	11.2	+5.2
Majority		935	22.4	−20.1
Turnout		4,173	38.2	−5.5
Labour hold		Swing	Labour to Con 10.0	

=== Bromley Cross ward ===
Bromley Cross ward
Party	Candidate	Votes	%	±%
Conservative	A Wilkinson	2,637	56.9	+9.4
Labour	R Stones	1,275	27.5	−7.8
Liberal Democrats	C Atty	722	15.6	+8.4
Majority		1,362	29.4	+17.3
Turnout		4,634	44.4	−2.2
Conservative hold		Swing	Labour to Con 8.6	

=== Burnden ward ===
Burnden ward
Party	Candidate	Votes	%	±%
Labour	P Birch	2,277	62.7	+1.2
Conservative	J Cosgrave	890	24.5	+0.9
Liberal Democrats	P Howarth	464	12.8	+2.7
Majority		1,387	38.2	+0.3
Turnout		3,631	38.9	−6.1
Labour hold		Swing		

=== Central ward ===
Central ward
Party	Candidate	Votes	%	±%
Labour	J Sherrington	2,286	67.4	−8.4
Conservative	L Shepherd	620	18.3	+8.6
Liberal Democrats	S Howarth	488	14.4	+8.1
Majority		1,666	49.1	−17.1
Turnout		3,394	42.7	−9.8
Labour hold		Swing	Labour to Con 8.5	

=== Daubhill ward ===
Daubhill ward
Party	Candidate	Votes	%	±%
Labour	M Donaghy	2,316	64.0	−9.5
Conservative	L Waterson	871	24.1	+5.4
Liberal Democrats	L Baron	432	11.9	+4.0
Majority		1,445	39.9	−14.9
Turnout		3,619	41.0	−7.3
Labour hold		Swing	Labour to Con 7.4	

=== Deane-cum-Heaton ward ===
Deane-cum-Heaton ward
Party	Candidate	Votes	%	±%
Conservative	J Hanscomb	3,431	55.5	+5.3
Labour	J Gillatt	1,962	31.7	−5.8
Liberal Democrats	L Easterman	715	11.6	+3.6
Independent	J Strickland	75	1.2	+1.2
Majority		1,469	23.7	+13.0
Turnout		6,183	46.8	−1.2
Conservative hold		Swing	Labour to Con 5.5	

=== Derby ward ===
Derby ward
Party	Candidate	Votes	%	±%
Labour	K Peters	2,889	80.0	+0.9
Conservative	F Tebbutt	436	12.1	+4.8
Liberal Democrats	C McPherson	284	7.9	+4.4
Majority		2,453	68.0	−1.0
Turnout		3,609	38.9	−11.2
Labour hold		Swing		

=== Farnworth ward ===
Farnworth ward
Party	Candidate	Votes	%	±%
Independent Labour	W Hardman	1,644	50.7	+26.0
Labour	A Devlin	927	28.6	−28.6
Conservative	C Adams	480	14.8	+2.4
Liberal Democrats	L Sanderson	191	5.9	+2.6
Majority		717	22.1	
Turnout		3,242	34.8	−14.2
Independent Labour gain from Labour		Swing	Labour to Ind Labour 27.3	

=== Halliwell ward ===
Halliwell ward
Party	Candidate	Votes	%	±%
Labour	C Morris	2,491	59.9	−5.7
Conservative	R Pryce	848	20.4	+6.9
Liberal Democrats	J Radlett	817	19.7	+6.2
Majority		1,643	39.5	−12.6
Turnout		4,156	43.6	−7.0
Labour hold		Swing	Labour to Con 6.3	

=== Harper Green ward ===
Harper Green ward
Party	Candidate	Votes	%	±%
Labour	C Dennis	2,350	64.5	−9.9
Conservative	P Cummins	698	19.2	+3.4
Liberal Democrats	P Barnett	593	16.3	+6.5
Majority		1,652	45.4	−13.3
Turnout		3,641	35.2	−6.8
Labour hold		Swing	Labour to LD 8.2	

=== Horwich ward ===
Horwich ward
Party	Candidate	Votes	%	±%
Labour	B McCracken	2,384	38.7	−6.9
Liberal Democrats	B Ronson	2,192	35.6	+2.7
Conservative	M Perks	1,589	25.8	+7.3
Majority		192	3.1	−9.5
Turnout		6,165	54.0	−1.6
Labour hold		Swing	Labour to Con 7.1	

=== Hulton Park ward ===
Hulton Park ward
Party	Candidate	Votes	%	±%
Conservative	G Smith	2,647	50.8	+11.4
Labour	T Hyams	1,583	30.4	−15.5
Liberal Democrats	D Wilkinson	977	18.8	+4.1
Majority		1,064	20.4	
Turnout		5,207	44.6	−1.1
Conservative hold		Swing	Labour to Con 13.4	

=== Kearsley ward ===
Kearsley ward
Party	Candidate	Votes	%	±%
Labour	P Spencer	2,132	51.3	−10.1
Liberal Democrats	J Rothwell	1,450	34.9	+4.2
Conservative	P Briscoe	570	13.7	+3.7
Majority		682	16.4	
Turnout		4,152	41.9	−5.7
Labour hold		Swing	Labour to LD 7.1	

=== Little Lever ward ===
Little Lever ward
Party	Candidate	Votes	%	±%
Conservative	D Dziubas	2,166	47.9	+13.3
Labour	R Evans	1,849	40.9	−17.9
Liberal Democrats	W Crook	504	11.2	+4.6
Majority		317	7.0	
Turnout		4,519	48.0	−7.4
Conservative hold		Swing	Labour to Con 15.6	

=== Smithills ward ===
Smithills ward
Party	Candidate	Votes	%	±%
Liberal Democrats	J Higson	2,686	55.7	+14.9
Conservative	G Gibson	1,296	26.9	+4.3
Labour	A Page	637	13.2	−10.9
Independent	S Graeme	201	4.2	−2.1
Majority		1,390	28.8	−13.6
Turnout		4,820	55.2	−3.4
Liberal Democrats hold		Swing	Labour to LD 12.9	

=== Tonge ward ===
Tonge ward
Party	Candidate	Votes	%	±%
Labour	P Perry	1,906	46.8	−11.3
Conservative	P Hamer	1,180	29.0	+4.4
Liberal Democrats	B Dunning	987	24.2	+6.9
Majority		726	17.8	−15.7
Turnout		4,073	46.0	−6.4
Labour hold		Swing	Labour to LD 9.1	

=== Westhoughton ward ===
Westhoughton ward
Party	Candidate	Votes	%	±%
Labour	P Finch	1,366	39.9	−11.1
Conservative	G Twist	1,032	30.1	+16.5
Liberal Democrats	P Mather	1,027	30.0	−5.5
Majority		334	9.7	−5.8
Turnout		3,425	44.0	−2.3
Labour hold		Swing	Labour to Con 13.8	
