= 1995 Bolton Metropolitan Borough Council election =

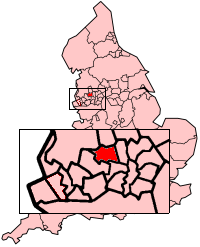
The Metropolitan Borough of Bolton shown within England.

The 1995 Bolton Metropolitan Borough Council election took place on 4 May 1995 to elect members of Bolton Metropolitan Borough Council in Greater Manchester, England. One third of the council was up for election and the Labour Party kept overall control of the council

21 seats were contested in the election, with 18 being won by the Labour Party, 1 by the Liberal Democrats and 2 by the Conservatives. 2 seats were contested in the Kearsley ward.

After the election, the composition of the council was:

- Labour 43
- Conservative 11
- Liberal Democrat 6

== Election results ==
Bolton local election result 1995
Party	Seats	Gains	Losses	Net gain/loss	Seats %	Votes %	Votes	+/−
Labour	18	5	0	+5		54.5	40,791	+2.0
Conservative	2	0	4	-4		23.3	17,392	-1.0
Liberal Democrats	1	0	0	-0		20.0	14,936	-3.0
Other parties	0	0	1	-1		2.2	1,650	+2.2

== Council Composition ==
Prior to the election the composition of the council was:

↓
38	15	6	1
Labour	Conservative	L	I

After the election the composition of the council was:

↓
43	11	6
Labour	Conservative	L

LD – Liberal Democrats
I – Independent

== Ward results ==
=== Astley Bridge ward ===
Astley Bridge ward
Party	Candidate	Votes	%	±%
Labour	S Murray	2,382	49.5	+0.9
Conservative	J Walsh	1,823	37.9	−1.5
Ind. Conservative	W Holt	325	6.8	+6.8
Liberal Democrats	S Howarth	278	5.8	−6.2
Majority		559	11.6	+2.4
Turnout		4,808	44.0	−3.4
Labour gain from Conservative		Swing	LD to Ind Con 6.5	

=== Blackrod ward ===
Blackrod ward
Party	Candidate	Votes	%	±%
Labour	K Helsby	2,261	63.9	+11.7
Conservative	D Mercer	770	21.8	−0.8
Liberal Democrats	D Watts	507	14.3	−10.9
Majority		1,491	42.1	+15.1
Turnout		3,538	36.1	−4.1
Labour hold		Swing	LD to Labour 11.3	

=== Bradshaw ward ===
Bradshaw ward
Party	Candidate	Votes	%	±%
Labour	P Fitzpatrick	2,029	49.2	+2.4
Conservative	E Crook	1,693	41.1	+5.2
Liberal Democrats	I Peacock	400	9.7	−7.6
Majority		336	8.1	−2.7
Turnout		4,121	37.8	−2.5
Labour gain from Conservative		Swing	LD to Con 6.4	

=== Breightmet ward ===
Breightmet ward
Party	Candidate	Votes	%	±%
Labour	D Grime	2,284	73.0	+4.9
Conservative	S Little	487	15.6	−1.4
Liberal Democrats	E Hill	359	11.5	−6.4
Majority		1,797	57.4	+10.2
Turnout		3,130	29.9	−5.9
Labour hold		Swing	LD to Labour 5.6	

=== Bromley Cross ward ===
Bromley Cross ward
Party	Candidate	Votes	%	±%
Conservative	A Wilkinson	1,944	46.8	+5.1
Labour	B Ramsden	1,745	42.0	+3.3
Liberal Democrats	C Atty	461	11.1	−8.5
Majority		199	4.8	+1.9
Turnout		4,150	39.9	−3.3
Conservative hold		Swing	LD to Con 6.8	

=== Burnden ward ===
Burnden ward
Party	Candidate	Votes	%	±%
Labour	P Birch	2,280	75.0	+6.4
Conservative	E Holland	421	13.9	−2.5
Liberal Democrats	R Harasiwka	338	11.1	−3.9
Majority		1,859	61.2	+10.0
Turnout		3,039	31.9	−3.1
Labour hold		Swing	LD to Labour 5.1	

=== Central ward ===
Central ward
Party	Candidate	Votes	%	±%
Labour	M McLoughlin	2,218	77.3	+1.6
Conservative	J Bradley	466	16.2	+0.8
Liberal Democrats	M Khan	185	6.4	−2.5
Majority		1,752	61.1	+0.8
Turnout		2,869	37.7	+3.3
Labour hold		Swing	LD to Labour 2.0	

=== Daubhill ward ===
Daubhill ward
Party	Candidate	Votes	%	±%
Labour	M Donaghy	2,023	75.2	+5.5
Conservative	F Tebbutt	409	14.5	−2.3
Liberal Democrats	L Sullivan	257	9.6	−3.3
Majority		1,614	60.0	+7.8
Turnout		2,689	32.3	−2.9
Labour hold		Swing	LD to Labour 3.9	

=== Deane-cum-Heaton ward ===
Deane-cum-Heaton ward
Party	Candidate	Votes	%	±%
Conservative	J Hanscomb	2,342	52.8	+9.2
Liberal Democrats	C Kay	2,095	47.2	+22.4
Majority		247	5.6	−6.4
Turnout		4,437	33.9	−9.3
Conservative hold		Swing		

=== Derby ward ===
Derby ward
Party	Candidate	Votes	%	±%
Labour	K Peters	2,771	73.5	+12.5
Conservative	Y Patel	840	12.3	−10.6
Liberal Democrats	L Bale	160	4.2	−2.0
Majority		1,931	51.2	+23.1
Turnout		3,771	41.2	−2.8
Labour hold		Swing	Con to Labour 11.5	

=== Farnworth ward ===
Farnworth ward
Party	Candidate	Votes	%	±%
Labour	R Stones	1,496	53.4	−24.3
Independent Labour	W Hardman	990	35.3	+35.3
Conservative	D Bailey	202	7.2	−2.7
Liberal Democrats	A Crook	113	4.0	−8.5
Majority		506	18.1	−47.1
Turnout		2,801	30.4	+2.1
Labour gain from Independent Labour		Swing	Labour to Ind Lab 29.8	

=== Halliwell ward ===
Halliwell ward
Party	Candidate	Votes	%	±%
Labour	C Morris	2,222	66.7	+9.0
Liberal Democrats	A Radlett	770	23.1	−8.5
Conservative	D Price	338	10.2	−0.5
Majority		1,452	43.6	+17.5
Turnout		3,330	35.9	−5.0
Labour hold		Swing	LD to Labour 8.7	

=== Harper Green ward ===
Harper Green ward
Party	Candidate	Votes	%	±%
Labour	C Dennis	2,194	80.5	+7.2
Conservative	S Kesler	295	10.8	−2.9
Liberal Democrats	D Connor	238	8.7	−4.2
Majority		1,899	69.6	+10.0
Turnout		2,727	27.7	−3.5
Labour hold		Swing	LD to Labour 5.7	

=== Horwich ward ===
Horwich ward
Party	Candidate	Votes	%	±%
Labour	B McCracken	2,335	48.1	+11.1
Liberal Democrats	P McGeehan	1,411	29.1	−18.2
Conservative	M Perks	1,030	21.2	+5.5
Independent	I Cooper	80	1.6	+1.6
Majority		924	19.0	
Turnout		4,856	43.5	−9.3
Labour hold		Swing	LD to Labour 14.6	

=== Hulton Park ward ===
Hulton Park ward
Party	Candidate	Votes	%	±%
Labour	B Ramsden	1,865	44.6	+0.4
Conservative	G Smith	1,129	27.0	−8.8
Liberal Democrats	D Cooper	1,122	26.9	+6.9
Independent	P Woodcock	61	1.5	+1.5
Majority		736	17.6	+9.1
Turnout		4,177	35.2	−3.6
Labour gain from Conservative		Swing	Con to LD 7.8	

=== Kearsley ward ===
Kearsley ward
Party	Candidate	Votes	%	±%
Labour	S Keating	1,987	30.3	
Labour	P Spencer	1,931	29.4	
Liberal Democrats	J Rothwell	1,202	18.3	
Liberal Democrats	M Rothwell	1,107	16.9	
Conservative	K Ward	176	2.7	
Conservative	S Jinks	165	2.5	
Majority				
Turnout		6,568	34.8	−3.4
Labour hold		Swing		
Labour hold		Swing		

=== Little Lever ward ===
Little Lever ward
Party	Candidate	Votes	%	±%
Labour	R Evans	2,090	56.3	−5.8
Conservative	D Dziubus	1,382	37.2	+9.4
Liberal Democrats	L Barron	243	6.5	−3.6
Majority		708	19.0	−15.3
Turnout		3,715	40.5	−4.1
Labour gain from Conservative		Swing	Labour to Con 7.6	

=== Smithills ward ===
Smithills ward
Party	Candidate	Votes	%	±%
Liberal Democrats	J Higson	2,233	59.2	+0.1
Labour	A Page	1,030	27.3	+7.7
Conservative	D Bagnall	511	13.5	−4.5
Majority		1,203	31.9	−7.5
Turnout		3,774	44.3	−4.8
Liberal Democrats hold		Swing	Con to Labour 6.1	

=== Tonge ward ===
Tonge ward
Party	Candidate	Votes	%	±%
Labour	P Perry	2,271	71.3	+4.2
Conservative	J Evans	620	19.5	−3.7
Liberal Democrats	S Howarth	296	9.3	−0.5
Majority		1,651	51.8	+7.9
Turnout		3,187	38.8	−6.9
Labour hold		Swing	Con to Labour 3.9	

=== Westhoughton ward ===
Westhoughton ward
Party	Candidate	Votes	%	±%
Labour	P Finch	1,377	44.7	+0.4
Liberal Democrats	E Hill	1,162	37.7	−8.3
Conservative	R Crawford	349	11.3	+0.6
Independent	D Goddard	194	6.3	+6.3
Majority		215	7.0	
Turnout		3,082	38.1	−16.9
Labour hold		Swing	LD to Ind 7.3	
