= 2014 Bolton Metropolitan Borough Council election =

2014 UK local government election

Results of the 2014 Bolton Metropolitan Borough Council election

Elections to Bolton Metropolitan Borough Council were held on 22 May 2014, along with the European Parliament elections, 2014. One third of the council was up for election, with each successful candidate to serve a four-year term of office, expiring in 2018.

21 seats were contested, including 2 seats in the Horwich and Blackrod ward following the resignation of Labour councillor Lindsey Kell. The Labour Party won 13 seats, the Conservatives won 5 seats, UKIP won 2 seats and the Liberal Democrats won 1 seat.

After the election, the total composition of the council was as follows:

- Labour 40
- Conservative 15
- UK Independence Party 2
- Liberal Democrats 3

== Election result ==
Bolton local election result 2014
| Party | Seats | Gains | Losses | Net gain/loss | Seats % | Votes % | Votes | +/− |
|---|---|---|---|---|---|---|---|---|
| Labour | 13 | 0 | 1 | -1 | | 40.3 | 29,891 | -9.7 |
| UKIP | 2 | 2 | 0 | +2 | | 25.3 | 18,770 | +25.3 |
| Conservative | 5 | 0 | 1 | -1 | | 22.4 | 16,642 | -8.9 |
| Liberal Democrats | 1 | 0 | 0 | +0 | | 7.1 | 5,300 | -5.1 |
| Green | 0 | 0 | 0 | 0 | 0 | 3.5 | 2,626 | -0.7 |
| English Democrat | 0 | 0 | 0 | 0 | 0 | 0.1 | 97 | -0.7 |
| BNP | 0 | 0 | 0 | 0 | 0 | 0.1 | 109 | -0.3 |
| Independent | 0 | 0 | 0 | 0 | 0 | 1.0 | 743 | -0.1 |

== Council Composition ==
Prior to the election the composition of the council was:

↓
| 41 | 16 | 3 |
| Labour | Conservative | LD |

After the election the composition of the council was:

↓
| 40 | 15 | 3 | 2 |
| Labour | Conservative | LD | U |

LD - Liberal Democrats
U - UKIP

== Ward results ==
=== Astley Bridge ward ===
Astley Bridge ward
| Party | Candidate | Votes | % | ±% |
|---|---|---|---|---|
| Conservative | John Walsh | 1,481 | 36.3 | −10.2 |
| Labour | Stuart William Murray | 1,279 | 31.4 | −9.5 |
| UKIP | Harry Lamb | 1,039 | 25.5 | +25.5 |
| Green | Ben Deed | 182 | 4.5 | +4.5 |
| Liberal Democrats | Clive Richard Atty | 85 | 2.1 | −1.2 |
| Rejected ballots | | 10 | 0.25 | |
| Majority | | 202 | 5.0 | −0.6 |
| Turnout | | 4,076 | 40.44 | +5.0 |
| Conservative hold | | Swing | Conservative to UKIP 17.8 | |

=== Bradshaw ward ===
Bradshaw ward
| Party | Candidate | Votes | % | ±% |
|---|---|---|---|---|
| Conservative | Mudasir Dean | 1,585 | 43.7 | −13.3 |
| UKIP | Arthur Norris | 932 | 25.7 | +25.7 |
| Labour | Paul Fitzpatrick | 786 | 21.7 | −9.2 |
| Liberal Democrats | Gaby McDowall | 172 | 4.7 | −7.4 |
| Green | Daniel Bolton | 150 | 4.1 | +4.1 |
| Rejected ballots | | 0 | 0.00 | |
| Majority | | 653 | 18.0 | −8.1 |
| Turnout | | 3,625 | 40.95 | +4.6 |
| Conservative hold | | Swing | Conservative to UKIP 19.5 | |

=== Breightmet ward ===
Breightmet ward
| Party | Candidate | Votes | % | ±% |
|---|---|---|---|---|
| Labour | Lynda Jean Byrne | 1,490 | 43.0 | −16.8 |
| UKIP | Kathleen Mary Kavanagh | 1,217 | 35.1 | +35.1 |
| Conservative | Clara Heyes | 577 | 16.7 | −13.1 |
| Green | Laura Diggle | 115 | 3.3 | −3.6 |
| Liberal Democrats | Stephen Frederick Howarth | 51 | 1.5 | −2.0 |
| Rejected ballots | | 13 | 0.38 | |
| Majority | | 273 | 7.9 | −22.1 |
| Turnout | | 3,463 | 37.01 | +4.5 |
| Labour hold | | Swing | Labour to UKIP 29.5 | |

=== Bromley Cross ward ===
Bromley Cross ward
| Party | Candidate | Votes | % | ±% |
|---|---|---|---|---|
| Conservative | David Wells Greenhalgh | 2,312 | 53.6 | −5.4 |
| Labour | Collette Harkin | 957 | 22.2 | −10.3 |
| UKIP | Lynda Rosewell | 878 | 20.3 | +20.3 |
| Liberal Democrats | Chris Atty | 169 | 3.9 | −4.6 |
| Rejected ballots | | 0 | 0.00 | |
| Majority | | 1,355 | 31.4 | +4.9 |
| Turnout | | 4,316 | 40.75 | +5.1 |
| Conservative hold | | Swing | Labour to UKIP 15.3 | |

=== Crompton ward ===
Crompton ward
| Party | Candidate | Votes | % | ±% |
|---|---|---|---|---|
| Labour | Sufrana Bashir-Ismail | 2,363 | 60.0 | −14.9 |
| UKIP | George Stanley Bown | 826 | 21.0 | +21.0 |
| Conservative | Ryan Patrick Haslam | 456 | 11.6 | −4.9 |
| Liberal Democrats | Anne Sanders Warren | 148 | 3.8 | −4.8 |
| Independent | Pam Humphreys | 121 | 3.1 | +3.1 |
| Rejected ballots | | 23 | 0.58 | |
| Majority | | 1,537 | 39.3 | −19.1 |
| Turnout | | 3,937 | 39.31 | +7.4 |
| Labour hold | | Swing | Labour to UKIP 17.9 | |

=== Farnworth ward ===
Farnworth ward
| Party | Candidate | Votes | % | ±% |
|---|---|---|---|---|
| Labour | Noel Spencer | 1,454 | 48.9 | −18.3 |
| UKIP | Jeff Armstrong | 1,108 | 37.3 | +37.3 |
| Conservative | Aidan Meagan | 211 | 7.1 | −6.7 |
| Green | Trevor Bonfield | 115 | 3.9 | −7.4 |
| Liberal Democrats | Doug Bagnall | 73 | 2.5 | −5.2 |
| Rejected ballots | | 12 | 0.40 | |
| Majority | | 346 | 11.7 | −14.7 |
| Turnout | | 2,973 | 28.14 | +6.5 |
| Labour hold | | Swing | Labour to UKIP 27.8 | |

=== Great Lever ward ===
Great Lever ward
| Party | Candidate | Votes | % | ±% |
|---|---|---|---|---|
| Labour | Mohammed Ayub | 2,420 | 68.6 | −5.4 |
| UKIP | Dot Sexton | 505 | 14.3 | +14.3 |
| Conservative | Jay Patel | 338 | 9.6 | −0.8 |
| Green | David William Collins | 127 | 3.6 | −7.1 |
| Liberal Democrats | Rebekah Fairhurst | 64 | 1.8 | −3.0 |
| Independent | Joseph Thomas Holt | 54 | 1.5 | +1.5 |
| Rejected ballots | | 21 | 0.60 | |
| Majority | | 1,915 | 54.6 | −8.7 |
| Turnout | | 3,529 | 36.59 | +5.9 |
| Labour hold | | Swing | Labour to UKIP 9.8 | |

=== Halliwell ward ===
Halliwell ward
| Party | Candidate | Votes | % | ±% |
|---|---|---|---|---|
| Labour | Akhtar Zaman | 2,260 | 66.1 | −12.3 |
| UKIP | Leo Taylor | 607 | 17.8 | +17.8 |
| Conservative | Jolyon Horton Coombs | 223 | 6.5 | −2.9 |
| Green | Ian David McHugh | 173 | 5.1 | −3.3 |
| Liberal Democrats | Francine Godfrey | 95 | 2.8 | −1.0 |
| Independent | Andrew Mckenzie | 42 | 1.2 | +1.2 |
| Rejected ballots | | 17 | 0.50 | |
| Majority | | 1,653 | 48.6 | −20.4 |
| Turnout | | 3,417 | 38.32 | +6.8 |
| Labour hold | | Swing | Labour to UKIP 15.0 | |

=== Harper Green ward ===
Harper Green ward
| Party | Candidate | Votes | % | ±% |
|---|---|---|---|---|
| Labour | Mike Francis | 1,713 | 56.7 | −16.3 |
| UKIP | Geoff Hamlett | 726 | 24.0 | +24.0 |
| Conservative | Rob Tyler | 366 | 12.1 | −5.1 |
| Green | Kathy Sykes | 115 | 3.8 | +3.8 |
| Liberal Democrats | Wendy Connor | 86 | 2.8 | −7.0 |
| Rejected ballots | | 13 | 0.43 | |
| Majority | | 987 | 32.8 | −23.1 |
| Turnout | | 3,019 | 31.40 | +7.7 |
| Labour hold | | Swing | Labour to UKIP 20.1 | |

=== Heaton and Lostock ward ===
Heaton and Lostock ward
| Party | Candidate | Votes | % | ±% |
|---|---|---|---|---|
| Conservative | Colin Shaw | 2,237 | 47.5 | −12.0 |
| Labour Co-op | John William Gillatt | 1,154 | 24.5 | −4.3 |
| UKIP | Stephen Thomas | 933 | 19.8 | +19.8 |
| Liberal Democrats | Christine Joyce Macpherson | 196 | 4.2 | −0.9 |
| Green | Hannah Louise Middleshaw | 179 | 3.8 | −2.8 |
| Rejected ballots | | 14 | 0.30 | |
| Majority | | 1,083 | 23.0 | −7.7 |
| Turnout | | 4,713 | 44.58 | +5.5 |
| Conservative hold | | Swing | Conservative to UKIP 15.9 | |

=== Horwich and Blackrod ward ===
Two seats were up for election. Stephen Pickup will have to stand again for election in 2016 and Alan Bury in 2018.

Horwich and Blackrod ward
| Party | Candidate | Votes | % | ±% |
|---|---|---|---|---|
| Labour | Alan Bury | 1,313 | 21.5 | |
| Labour | Stephen Pickup | 1,310 | 21.5 | |
| UKIP | Bob Horsefield | 1,147 | 18.8 | |
| Conservative | Carol Ann Forshaw | 850 | 13.9 | |
| Conservative | Daniel Clifford Haslam | 708 | 11.6 | |
| Green | Keith Michael Cocker | 401 | 6.6 | |
| Liberal Democrats | Lynne McCartin | 201 | 3.3 | |
| Liberal Democrats | Lynn Natalie Rock | 159 | 2.6 | |
| Rejected ballots | | 8 | 0.13 | |
| Majority | | 3 | | |
| Turnout | | 3,048 | 31.39 | +0.9 |
| Labour hold | | | | |
| Labour hold | | | | |

=== Horwich North East ward ===
Horwich North East ward
| Party | Candidate | Votes | % | ±% |
|---|---|---|---|---|
| Labour | Kevin Peter McKeon | 1,324 | 35.4 | −8.2 |
| UKIP | Peter McGeehan | 888 | 23.7 | +23.7 |
| Conservative | Anne Barbara Galloway | 743 | 19.9 | +1.2 |
| Liberal Democrats | Stephen Michael Rock | 573 | 15.3 | −4.1 |
| Green | Rod Riesco | 203 | 5.4 | −4.5 |
| Rejected ballots | | 9 | 0.24 | |
| Majority | | 436 | 11.7 | −12.6 |
| Turnout | | 3,740 | 37.93 | +3.0 |
| Labour hold | | Swing | Labour to UKIP 15.9 | |

=== Hulton ward ===
Hulton ward
| Party | Candidate | Votes | % | ±% |
|---|---|---|---|---|
| UKIP | Diane Parkinson | 1,291 | 33.7 | +33.7 |
| Conservative | Andy Morgan | 1,150 | 30.0 | −12.5 |
| Labour | Shafaqat Shaikh | 1,140 | 29.8 | −12.7 |
| Green | James Tomkinson | 162 | 4.2 | −6.6 |
| Liberal Democrats | David Charles Cooper | 69 | 1.8 | −0.3 |
| Rejected ballots | | 15 | 0.39 | |
| Majority | | 141 | 3.7 | |
| Turnout | | 3,827 | 39.24 | +8.5 |
| UKIP gain from Conservative | | Swing | Conservative to UKIP 23.1 | |

=== Kearsley ward ===
Kearsley ward
| Party | Candidate | Votes | % | ±% |
|---|---|---|---|---|
| Labour | Derek Burrows | 1,139 | 35.7 | −19.4 |
| UKIP | Mark Joseph Cunningham | 1,096 | 34.4 | +34.4 |
| Liberal Democrats | Margaret Patricia Rothwell | 348 | 10.9 | −23.0 |
| Independent | Simon Paul Colley | 309 | 9.7 | +9.7 |
| Conservative | Sandra Macneill | 278 | 8.7 | −2.3 |
| Rejected ballots | | 18 | 0.56 | |
| Majority | | 43 | 1.3 | −19.8 |
| Turnout | | 3,188 | 30.68 | +4.7 |
| Labour hold | | Swing | Labour to UKIP 26.9 | |

=== Little Lever and Darcy Lever ward ===
Little Lever and Darcy Lever ward
| Party | Candidate | Votes | % | ±% |
|---|---|---|---|---|
| UKIP | Paul Richardson | 1,255 | 33.2 | +33.2 |
| Labour | Maureen Connell | 1,051 | 27.8 | −16.5 |
| Liberal Democrats | Eric John Hyde | 661 | 17.5 | −3.5 |
| Conservative | Rees Gibbon | 657 | 17.4 | −9.1 |
| Green | Alwynne Cartmell | 147 | 3.9 | −4.3 |
| Rejected ballots | | 7 | 0.19 | |
| Majority | | 204 | 5.4 | |
| Turnout | | 3,778 | 39.51 | +3.5 |
| UKIP gain from Labour | | Swing | Labour to UKIP 24.8 | |

=== Rumworth ward ===
Rumworth ward
| Party | Candidate | Votes | % | ±% |
|---|---|---|---|---|
| Labour | Ismail Ibrahim | 2,876 | 72.5 | −6.0 |
| UKIP | Geoffrey David Kay | 492 | 12.4 | +12.4 |
| Conservative | Jack Heyes | 317 | 8.0 | −1.6 |
| Green | Alan Johnson | 200 | 5.0 | −4.0 |
| Liberal Democrats | Jaleh Salari | 66 | 1.7 | −1.2 |
| Rejected ballots | | 16 | 0.40 | |
| Majority | | 2,384 | 60.3 | −8.5 |
| Turnout | | 3,967 | 39.77 | +9.0 |
| Labour hold | | Swing | Labour to UKIP 9.2 | |

=== Smithills ward ===
Smithills ward
| Party | Candidate | Votes | % | ±% |
|---|---|---|---|---|
| Liberal Democrats | Andrew Martin | 1,674 | 37.5 | −3.7 |
| Labour | Kevin Patrick Morris | 1,329 | 29.8 | −10.2 |
| UKIP | Aaron Hepworth | 876 | 19.6 | +19.6 |
| Conservative | Christine Flanigan | 429 | 9.6 | −4.3 |
| Green | Richard Alexander Middleshaw | 139 | 3.1 | −1.9 |
| Rejected ballots | | 16 | 0.36 | |
| Majority | | 345 | 7.7 | +6.5 |
| Turnout | | 4,463 | 45.44 | +6.0 |
| Liberal Democrats hold | | Swing | Labour to UKIP 14.9 | |

=== Tonge with the Haulgh ward ===
Tonge with the Haulgh ward
| Party | Candidate | Votes | % | ±% |
|---|---|---|---|---|
| Labour | Nick Peel | 1,399 | 43.3 | −19.7 |
| UKIP | Derek Fisher | 1,053 | 32.6 | +32.6 |
| Conservative | Zoe Jennifer Catherine Kirk-Robinson | 486 | 15.1 | −8.1 |
| BNP | Dorothee Sayers | 109 | 3.4 | −6.4 |
| Green | Hafsa Patel | 91 | 2.8 | +2.8 |
| Liberal Democrats | Paul Anthony Harasiwka | 66 | 2.0 | −2.1 |
| Left Unity | Eric Thomas Hyland | 14 | 0.4 | +0.4 |
| Rejected ballots | | 10 | 0.31 | |
| Majority | | 346 | 10.7 | −29.1 |
| Turnout | | 3,228 | 36.30 | +6.2 |
| Labour hold | | Swing | Labour to UKIP 26.5 | |

=== Westhoughton North and Chew Moor ward ===
Westhoughton North and Chew Moor ward
| Party | Candidate | Votes | % | ±% |
|---|---|---|---|---|
| Conservative | Martyn Andrew Cox | 1,424 | 34.0 | −1.1 |
| Labour | Anne Graham | 1,278 | 30.5 | −15.9 |
| UKIP | Joan Johnson | 984 | 23.5 | +23.5 |
| Independent | Jack Speight | 203 | 4.8 | −6.8 |
| Liberal Democrats | Derek John Gradwell | 163 | 3.9 | −3.0 |
| Green | Heather Rylance | 127 | 3.0 | +3.0 |
| Rejected ballots | | 8 | 0.19 | |
| Majority | | 146 | 3.5 | |
| Turnout | | 4,187 | 38.24 | +5.2 |
| Conservative hold | | Swing | Labour to UKIP 19.7 | |

=== Westhoughton South ward ===
Westhoughton South ward
| Party | Candidate | Votes | % | ±% |
|---|---|---|---|---|
| Labour | Kevin Jones | 1,268 | 39.3 | −3.1 |
| UKIP | Les Wareing | 917 | 28.4 | +28.4 |
| Conservative | Stephen Wallen | 562 | 17.4 | +4.7 |
| Liberal Democrats | David Arthur Wilkinson | 361 | 11.2 | −23.6 |
| English Democrat | Derek John Bullock | 97 | 3.0 | −7.1 |
| Rejected ballots | | 19 | 0.59 | |
| Majority | | 351 | 10.9 | +3.3 |
| Turnout | | 3,224 | 33.60 | +2.8 |
| Labour hold | | Swing | Lib Dem to UKIP 26.0 | |
