= 2002 Bolton Metropolitan Borough Council election =

2002 UK local government election

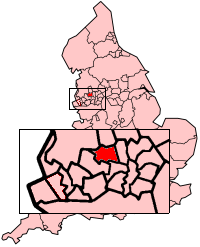
The Metropolitan Borough of Bolton shown within England.

Elections to Bolton Metropolitan Borough Council were held on 2 May 2002. One third of the council was up for election and the Labour party kept overall control of the council.

21 seats were contested in the election with 2 seats being contested in the Burnden ward. 12 were won by the Labour Party, with 5 won by the Conservatives and 4 won by the Liberal Democrats

After the election, the composition of the council was

- Labour 31
- Conservative 16
- Liberal Democrat 13

== Result ==
Bolton local election result 2002
Party	Seats	Gains	Losses	Net gain/loss	Seats %	Votes %	Votes	+/−
Labour	12	0	3	-3	57.1	40.3	27,034	+4.2%
Conservative	5	1	0	+1	23.8	33.7	22,580	-5.6%
Liberal Democrats	4	2	0	+2	19.0	23.2	15,526	+0.4%
Socialist Labour	0	0	0	0	0	1.2	828	+0.2%
Independent	0	0	0	0	0	0.7	459	+0.0%
Socialist Alliance	0	0	0	0	0	0.6	425	+0.6%
Green	0	0	0	0	0	0.3	197	+0.2%

== Council Composition ==
Prior to the election the composition of the council was:

↓
34	15	11
Labour	Conservative	Lib Dems

After the election the composition of the council was:

↓
31	16	13
Labour	Conservative	Lib Dems

== Ward results ==
=== Astley Bridge ward ===
Astley Bridge ward
Party	Candidate	Votes	%	±%
Conservative	J Walsh	2,103	53.7	−10.4
Labour	S Murray	1,358	34.7	+7.4
Liberal Democrats	C McPhearson	452	11.6	+3.0
Majority		745	19.0	−17.8
Turnout		3,913	35.0	+6.0
Conservative hold		Swing	Con to Labour 8.9	

=== Blackrod ward ===
Blackrod ward
Party	Candidate	Votes	%	±%
Labour	I Seddon	1,255	38.1	+3.8
Conservative	M Hollick	1,193	36.3	−2.9
Liberal Democrats	I Hamilton	842	25.6	−0.9
Majority		62	1.8	
Turnout		3,290	31.0	+5.0
Labour hold		Swing	Con to Labour 3.3	

=== Bradshaw ward ===
Bradshaw ward
Party	Candidate	Votes	%	±%
Conservative	P Brierley	2,117	55.5	−2.4
Labour	S Ward	1,110	29.1	−0.4
Liberal Democrats	S Howarth	587	15.4	+2.8
Majority		1,007	26.4	−2.0
Turnout		3,814	35.0	+5.0
Conservative hold		Swing	Con to LD 2.6	

=== Breightmet ward ===
Breightmet ward
Party	Candidate	Votes	%	±%
Labour	M Murray	1,329	46.5	−2.8
Conservative	R Elliott	1,173	41.1	+0.2
Liberal Democrats	S Rock	353	12.4	+2.6
Majority		156	5.4	−3.0
Turnout		2,855	28.0	+7.0
Labour hold		Swing	Labour to LD 2.5	

=== Bromley Cross ward ===
Bromley Cross ward
Party	Candidate	Votes	%	±%
Conservative	D Carr	2,393	59.7	+2.2
Labour	A Muscat	1,050	26.2	−0.4
Liberal Democrats	S Ball	563	14.1	−1.8
Majority		1,343	33.5	+2.6
Turnout		4,006	36.0	−9.0
Conservative hold		Swing	LD to Con 2.0	

=== Burnden ward ===
Burnden ward (2)
Party	Candidate	Votes	%	±%
Labour	P Howarth	1,280	22.3	
Labour	P Spencer	1,159	20.2	
Conservative	M Idrees	1,154	20.1	
Conservative	M Iqbal	1,105	19.3	
Liberal Democrats	D Connor	443	7.7	
Liberal Democrats	R Harasiwka	340	5.9	
Socialist Labour	D Entwistle	133	2.3	
Socialist Alliance	D Sumner	115	2.0	
Turnout		5,729	38.0	+9.0
Labour hold		Swing		
Labour hold		Swing		

=== Central ward ===
Central ward
Party	Candidate	Votes	%	±%
Labour	H Alli	1,270	44.2	−3.7
Conservative	H Simjee	615	21.4	−21.6
Independent	V Patel	459	16.0	+16.0
Liberal Democrats	M Eidlow	278	9.7	+3.1
Socialist Alliance	M Lowe	144	5.0	+5.0
Socialist Labour	M McLoughlin	108	3.8	+1.3
Majority		655	22.8	+17.9
Turnout		2,874	34.0	+10.0
Labour hold		Swing	Con to Ind 18.8	

=== Daubhill ward ===
Daubhill ward
Party	Candidate	Votes	%	±%
Labour	G Harkin	1,404	55.7	+3.2
Conservative	J Groak	690	27.4	−6.7
Liberal Democrats	L Greensit	428	17.0	+3.6
Majority		714	28.3	+9.9
Turnout		2,522	28.0	+7.0
Labour hold		Swing	Con to LD 5.1	

=== Deane-cum-Heaton ward ===
Deane-cum-Heaton ward
Party	Candidate	Votes	%	±%
Conservative	C Shaw	2,607	55.4	−4.8
Labour	J Gillatt	1,199	25.5	+0.1
Liberal Democrats	S Bromley	902	19.2	+4.8
Majority		1,408	29.9	−4.9
Turnout		4,708	34.0	+5.0
Conservative hold		Swing	Con to LD 4.8	

=== Derby ward ===
Derby ward
Party	Candidate	Votes	%	±%
Labour	E Adia	2,553	76.7	+31.7
Conservative	G Peel	384	11.5	−36.2
Liberal Democrats	S McGeehan	228	6.9	+3.0
Socialist Labour	A Entwistle	162	4.9	+1.6
Majority		2,169	65.2	
Turnout		3,327	34.0	+6.0
Labour hold		Swing	Con to Labour 33.9	

=== Farnworth ward ===
Farnworth ward
Party	Candidate	Votes	%	±%
Labour	J Lord	1,141	59.0	+3.1
Conservative	R O'Neill	344	17.8	−4.5
Liberal Democrats	A Higson	317	16.4	+1.0
Socialist Labour	W Kelly	133	6.9	+0.5
Majority		797	41.2	+7.6
Turnout		1,935	20.0	−5.0
Labour hold		Swing	Con to Labour 3.8	

=== Halliwell ward ===
Halliwell ward
Party	Candidate	Votes	%	±%
Labour	A Zaman	1,676	52.8	+4.7
Conservative	J Coombs	724	22.8	−10.8
Liberal Democrats	M Cox	511	16.1	+5.3
Socialist Labour	H Broadbent	169	5.3	+0.6
Green	A Cartmel	96	3.0	+0.1
Majority		952	30.0	+15.5
Turnout		3,176	32.0	+9.0
Labour hold		Swing	Con to LD 8.0	

=== Harper Green ward ===
Harper Green ward
Party	Candidate	Votes	%	±%
Labour	L Williamson	1,295	57.3	+3.8
Conservative	R Tyler	506	22.4	−8.0
Liberal Democrats	W Cooper	338	14.9	+3.5
Socialist Labour	W Kelly	123	5.4	+0.8
Majority		789	34.9	+11.8
Turnout		2,262	21.0	+5.5
Labour hold		Swing	Con to Lab 5.9	

=== Horwich ward ===
Horwich ward
Party	Candidate	Votes	%	±%
Liberal Democrats	R Ronson	2,283	55.2	−1.8
Labour	M Kilcoyne	1,082	26.2	+4.3
Conservative	O Fairhurst	687	16.6	−4.5
Socialist Alliance	R Ince	85	2.1	+2.1
Majority		1,101	29.0	−6.1
Turnout		4,137	36.0	+7.0
Liberal Democrats hold		Swing	Con to Labour 4.4	

=== Hulton Park ward ===
Hulton Park ward
Party	Candidate	Votes	%	±%
Conservative	A Morgan	1,540	36.4	−5.8
Liberal Democrats	J Cronnolley	1,451	34.3	+5.4
Labour	E Hyland	1,236	29.2	+0.4
Majority		89	2.1	−11.2
Turnout		4,227	28.0	+7.0
Conservative gain from Labour		Swing	Con to LD 5.6	

=== Kearsley ward ===
Kearsley ward
Party	Candidate	Votes	%	±%
Liberal Democrats	W Collison	1,357	48.4	−5.3
Labour	D Burrows	1,182	42.2	+5.7
Conservative	S Kesler	263	9.4	−0.4
Majority		175	6.2	−11.0
Turnout		2,802	27.0	+4.0
Liberal Democrats gain from Labour		Swing	LD to Labour 5.5	

=== Little Lever ward ===
Little Lever ward
Party	Candidate	Votes	%	±%
Labour	A Connell	1,550	49.4	+4.5
Conservative	J Tyler	1,153	36.8	−7.1
Liberal Democrats	B Crook	351	11.2	+0.0
Socialist Alliance	D Kemp	81	2.6	+2.6
Majority		397	12.6	+11.6
Turnout		3,135	34.0	+8.0
Labour hold		Swing	Con to Labour 5.8	

=== Smithills ward ===
Smithills ward
Party	Candidate	Votes	%	±%
Liberal Democrats	R Hayes	1,836	59.0	−5.4
Conservative	D Bagnall	605	19.4	−1.0
Labour	S Hynes	572	18.4	+3.2
Green	F Calvert	101	3.2	+3.2
Majority		1,231	39.6	−4.4
Turnout		3,114	36.0	−6.5
Liberal Democrats hold		Swing	LD to Labour 4.3	

=== Tonge ward ===
Tonge ward
Party	Candidate	Votes	%	±%
Labour	F White	1,345	52.4	+3.7
Conservative	N Ford	879	34.3	+7.7
Liberal Democrats	M Langdon	342	13.3	+6.1
Majority		466	18.1	−4.0
Turnout		2,566	32.0	+5.5
Labour hold		Swing		

=== Westhoughton ward ===
Westhoughton ward
Party	Candidate	Votes	%	±%
Liberal Democrats	J Silvester	1,324	49.8	−2.0
Labour	D Chadwick	988	37.2	+3.3
Conservative	J Batley	345	13.0	−1.2
Majority		336	12.6	−5.3
Turnout		2,657	28.0	+6.0
Liberal Democrats gain from Labour		Swing	LD to Labour 2.6	

== Sources ==
=== References ===
- Rallings, Colin; Thrasher, Michael. "Bolton Metropolitan Borough Council Election Results 1973–2012" (PDF). The Elections Centre. The Elections Centre, Plymouth University.
