= 2000 Bolton Metropolitan Borough Council election =

2000 UK local government election

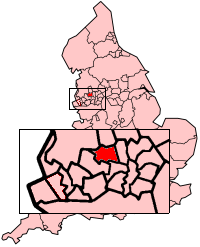
The Metropolitan Borough of Bolton shown within England.

Elections to Bolton Metropolitan Borough Council were held on 4 May 2000. One third of the council was up for election and the Labour Party kept overall control of the council.

20 seats were contested in the election, with 9 being won by the Labour Party, 7 by the Conservatives and 4 by the Liberal Democrats

After the election, the composition of the council was:

- Labour 34
- Conservative 15
- Liberal Democrat 11

== Result ==
Bolton local election result 2000
Party	Seats	Gains	Losses	Net gain/loss	Seats %	Votes %	Votes	+/−
Labour	9	0	7	-7	45.0	36.1	19,621	-10.3
Conservative	7	5	0	+5	35.0	39.3	21,322	+8.7
Liberal Democrats	4	2	0	+2	20.0	22.8	12,381	+1.8
Socialist Labour	0	0	0	0	0	1.0	555	
Independent	0	0	0	0	0	0.7	367	
Green	0	0	0	0	0	0.1	63	

== Council Composition ==
Prior to the election the composition of the council was:

↓
41	10	9
Labour	Conservative	L

After the election the composition of the council was:

↓
34	15	11
Labour	Conservative	L

LD – Liberal Democrats

== Ward results ==
=== Astley Bridge ward ===
Astley Bridge ward
Party	Candidate	Votes	%	±%
Conservative	H Fairclough	2,091	64.1	+15.7
Labour	S Hynes	892	27.3	−17.2
Liberal Democrats	C Macpherson	280	8.6	+1.5
Majority		1,199	36.8	+33.0
Turnout		3,263	29.0	−2.0
Conservative gain from Labour		Swing	Labour to Con 16.4	

=== Blackrod ward ===
Blackrod ward
Party	Candidate	Votes	%	±%
Conservative	J Barrow	1,055	39.2	+2.9
Labour	J Lavin	923	34.3	−10.7
Liberal Democrats	I Hamilton	714	26.5	+7.8
Majority		132	4.9	
Turnout		2,692	26.0	+2.0
Conservative gain from Labour		Swing	Labour to LD 9.2	

=== Bradshaw ward ===
Bradshaw ward
Party	Candidate	Votes	%	±%
Conservative	D Brierley	1,911	57.9	+8.8
Labour	C Whitby	975	29.5	−9.7
Liberal Democrats	S Howarth	416	12.6	+0.9
Majority		936	28.4	+18.5
Turnout		3,302	30.0	+1.0
Conservative gain from Labour		Swing	Labour to Con 9.2	

=== Breightmet ward ===
Breightmet ward
Party	Candidate	Votes	%	±%
Labour	J Byrne	1,065	49.3	−10.8
Conservative	R Elliott	884	40.9	+14.6
Liberal Democrats	P Howarth	212	9.8	−3.8
Majority		171	8.4	−25.4
Turnout		2,161	21.0	+5.0
Labour hold		Swing	Labour to Con 12.7	

=== Bromley Cross ward ===
Bromley Cross ward
Party	Candidate	Votes	%	±%
Conservative	N Critchley	2,870	57.5	−0.8
Labour	A Muscat	1,325	26.6	−6.1
Liberal Democrats	S Ball	794	15.9	+6.9
Majority		1,545	30.9	+5.4
Turnout		4,989	45.0	+13.0
Conservative hold		Swing	Labour to LD 6.5	

=== Burnden ward ===
Burnden ward
Party	Candidate	Votes	%	±%
Labour	D Eastwood	1,050	53.9	−15.2
Conservative	M Woodward	545	28.0	+8.9
Liberal Democrats	D Connor	272	14.0	+2.2
Socialist Labour	D Entwistle	80	4.1	+4.1
Majority		505	25.9	−24.1
Turnout		1,947	29.0	+9.0
Labour hold		Swing	Labour to Con 12.0	

=== Central ward ===
Central ward
Party	Candidate	Votes	%	±%
Labour	R Howarth	1,039	47.9	−19.5
Conservative	F Ahmed	932	43.0	+19.8
Liberal Democrats	M Eidlow	142	6.6	+0.9
Socialist Labour	L Lowe	54	2.5	−1.3
Majority		107	4.9	−39.2
Turnout		2,167	24.0	+0.0
Labour hold		Swing	Labour to Con 19.6	

=== Daubhill ward ===
Daubhill ward
Party	Candidate	Votes	%	±%
Labour	T Anderton	984	52.5	−15.4
Conservative	W Southern	638	34.1	+11.3
Liberal Democrats	L Greensits	251	13.4	+4.1
Majority		346	18.4	−26.7
Turnout		1,873	21.0	+3.0
Labour hold		Swing	Labour to Con 13.3	

=== Deane-cum-Heaton ward ===
Deane-cum-Heaton ward
Party	Candidate	Votes	%	±%
Conservative	F Rushton	2,355	60.2	+2.1
Labour	J Woodrow	993	25.4	−2.6
Liberal Democrats	D Cooper	563	14.4	+0.4
Majority		1,362	34.8	+4.7
Turnout		3,911	29.0	+2.0
Conservative hold		Swing	Labour to Con 2.3	

=== Derby ward ===
Derby ward
Party	Candidate	Votes	%	±%
Conservative	A Hussain	1,317	47.7	+31.2
Labour	J Foster	1,243	45.0	−32.4
Liberal Democrats	S McGeehan	109	3.9	−2.2
Socialist Labour	A Entwistle	91	3.3	+3.3
Majority		74	2.7	2.7
Turnout		2,760	28.0	+4.0
Conservative gain from Labour		Swing	Labour to Con 31.8	

=== Farnworth ward ===
Farnworth ward
Party	Candidate	Votes	%	±%
Labour	A Spencer	1,345	55.9	−9.8
Conservative	J Cottam	536	22.3	+10.0
Liberal Democrats	E Bell	371	15.4	+0.8
Socialist Labour	W Kelly	153	6.4	−0.9
Majority		809	33.6	−17.5
Turnout		1,873	25.0	+10.0
Labour hold		Swing	Labour to Con 9.9	

=== Halliwell ward ===
Halliwell ward
Party	Candidate	Votes	%	±%
Labour	L Thomas	1,053	48.1	−10.6
Conservative	J Coombs	737	33.6	+11.0
Liberal Democrats	A Warren	236	10.8	−2.9
Socialist Labour	H Broadbent	102	4.7	−0.3
Green	A Cartmell	63	2.9	+2.9
Majority		316	14.5	−21.6
Turnout		2,191	23.0	−1.0
Labour hold		Swing	Labour to Con 10.8	

=== Harper Green ward ===
Harper Green ward
Party	Candidate	Votes	%	±%
Labour	M Clare	865	53.5	−11.7
Conservative	R Tyler	492	30.4	+14.3
Liberal Democrats	W Connor	184	11.4	−1.1
Socialist Labour	W Kelly	75	4.6	−1.7
Majority		373	23.1	−26.1
Turnout		1,616	15.5	−0.5
Labour hold		Swing	Labour to Con 13.0	

=== Horwich ward ===
Horwich ward
Party	Candidate	Votes	%	±%
Liberal Democrats	B Ronson	1,884	57.0	+17.4
Labour	B Sharples	725	21.9	−17.0
Conservative	P Baxendale	696	21.1	−0.5
Majority		1,159	35.1	+34.4
Turnout		3,305	29.0	+0.0
Liberal Democrats hold		Swing	Labour to LD 17.2	

=== Hulton Park ward ===
Hulton Park ward
Party	Candidate	Votes	%	±%
Conservative	A Walsh	1,391	42.2	+11.7
Liberal Democrats	J Cronnolley	953	28.9	−6.3
Labour	J Kellett	949	28.8	−5.5
Majority		438	13.3	
Turnout		3,293	26.0	+2.0
Conservative gain from Labour		Swing	LD to Con 9.0	

=== Kearsley ward ===
Kearsley ward
Party	Candidate	Votes	%	±%
Liberal Democrats	M Rothwell	1,257	53.7	+4.6
Labour	D Burrows	854	36.5	−7.9
Conservative	S Kesler	229	9.8	+3.4
Majority		403	17.2	+12.5
Turnout		2,340	23.0	−1.0
Liberal Democrats gain from Labour		Swing	Labour to LD 6.2	

=== Little Lever ward ===
Little Lever ward
Party	Candidate	Votes	%	±%
Labour	M Connell	1,103	44.9	−6.9
Conservative	J Tyler	1,078	43.9	+6.0
Liberal Democrats	W Crook	276	11.2	+0.9
Majority		25	1.0	−13.0
Turnout		2,457	26.0	−2.0
Labour hold		Swing	Labour to Con 6.4	

=== Smithills ward ===
Smithills ward
Party	Candidate	Votes	%	±%
Liberal Democrats	C Swarbrick	2,278	64.4	+3.4
Conservative	D Bagnall	723	20.4	+1.0
Labour	A Zaman	538	15.2	−4.4
Majority		1,555	44.0	+2.6
Turnout		3,539	42.5	+16.2
Liberal Democrats hold		Swing	Labour to LD 3.9	

=== Tonge ward ===
Tonge ward
Party	Candidate	Votes	%	±%
Labour	N Peel	1,021	48.7	+2.6
Conservative	J Maclaren-Whibley	557	26.6	+3.5
Independent	P Perry	367	17.5	−6.7
Liberal Democrats	M Langdon	152	7.2	+0.6
Majority		464	22.1	+0.3
Turnout		2,097	26.5	−3.5
Labour hold		Swing	Ind to Con 5.1	

=== Westhoughton ward ===
Westhoughton ward
Party	Candidate	Votes	%	±%
Liberal Democrats	J Ainscough	1,037	51.8	−8.8
Labour	T Fitzpatrick	679	33.9	+2.5
Conservative	S Wallen	285	14.2	+6.1
Majority		358	17.9	−11.3
Turnout		2,001	22.0	−4.0
Liberal Democrats gain from Labour		Swing	LD to Con 7.4	

== Sources ==
=== References ===
- Rallings, Colin; Thrasher, Michael. "Bolton Metropolitan Borough Council Election Results 1973–2012" (PDF). The Elections Centre. The Elections Centre, Plymouth University.
