= 1975 Bolton Metropolitan Borough Council election =

1975 UK local government election

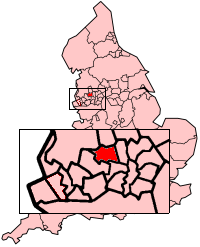
The Metropolitan Borough of Bolton shown within England.

Elections to Bolton Metropolitan Borough Council were held in May 1975. The Conservatives retained control of the Council.

23 seats were contested, with 18 being won by the Conservative Party, 4 by the Labour Party and 1 by the Liberal Party.

After the election, the composition of the Council was:

- Conservative 42
- Labour 23
- Liberal Party 3
- Independent 1

== Election result ==
Bolton local election result 1975
Party	Seats	Gains	Losses	Net gain/loss	Seats %	Votes %	Votes	+/−
Conservative	18	7	0	+7		56.6	37,622	+11.9
Labour	4	0	8	-8		32.6	21,636	-12.0
Liberal	1	1	0	+1		8.4	5,603	-0.5
Other parties	0	0	0	+0		2.3	1,543	+0.2

== Ward results ==
=== Astley Bridge ward ===
Astley Bridge ward (3)
Party	Candidate	Votes	%	±%
Conservative	A Hibbert	2,694	77.2	+9.9
Labour	N Lee	795	22.8	−9.9
Majority		1,899	54.4	
Turnout		3,489	36.0	+2.0
Conservative hold		Swing	Labour to Con 9.9	

=== Bradshaw North and South ward ===
Bradshaw North and South ward (3)
Party	Candidate	Votes	%	±%
Conservative	K Howarth	1,462	50.0	+5.0
Independent	D Hewitt	722	24.7	+24.7
Liberal	J Webster	565	19.3	−23.8
Labour	C Benjamin	173	5.9	−6.1
Majority		740	25.3	
Turnout		2,922	46.0	+5.5
Conservative hold		Swing	Lib to Ind 24.2	

=== Bradford ward ===
Bradford ward (3)
Party	Candidate	Votes	%	±%
Labour	C Skull	1,014	63.1	−13.9
Conservative	S Haslam	593	36.9	+13.9
Majority		421	26.2	
Turnout		1,607	34.0	+3.0
Labour hold		Swing	Labour to Con 13.9	

=== Bromley Cross, Eagley and Egerton ward ===
Bromley Cross, Eagley and Egerton ward (3)
Party	Candidate	Votes	%	±%
Conservative	H Bennett	2,096	57.4	+11.8
Liberal	C Coomer	843	23.1	−13.1
Labour	M Maloney	713	19.5	+1.4
Majority		1,253	34.3	
Turnout		3,652	44.0	+3.7
Conservative hold		Swing	Lib to Con 12.4	

=== Church East and North ward ===
Church East and North ward (3)
Party	Candidate	Votes	%	±%
Conservative	A O'Neil	1,689	62.6	+3.1
Labour	J Perry	791	29.3	−11.3
Liberal	J Walton	217	8.0	+8.0
Majority		898	33.3	
Turnout		2,697	40.0	−1.0
Conservative hold		Swing	Labour to Lib 9.6	

=== Darcy Lever cum Breightmet ward ===
Darcy Lever cum Breightmet ward (3)
Party	Candidate	Votes	%	±%
Conservative	A Chadbond	2,352	60.2	+13.2
Labour	P Johnson	1,674	39.8	−13.2
Majority		858	20.4	
Turnout		4,206	31.0	+0.0
Conservative gain from Labour		Swing	Labour to Con 13.2	

=== Deane cum Lostock ward ===
Deane cum Lostock ward (3)
Party	Candidate	Votes	%	±%
Conservative	R Ward	2,015	77.4	+3.4
Labour	S Walker	590	22.6	−3.4
Majority		1,425	54.7	
Turnout		2,605	37.0	+7.0
Conservative hold		Swing	Labour to Con 3.4	

=== Derby ward ===
Derby ward (3)
Party	Candidate	Votes	%	±%
Labour	S Ward	1,052	61.5	−7.0
Conservative	D Smith	659	38.5	+7.0
Majority		393	23.0	
Turnout		1,711	28.0	−1.0
Labour hold		Swing	Labour to Con 7.0	

=== Farnworth North ward ===
Farnworth North ward (3)
Party	Candidate	Votes	%	±%
Conservative	A Royse	1,266	45.9	+21.2
Labour	G Brown	1,145	41.5	−33.8
Liberal	J Lever	271	9.8	+9.8
Communist	T Hill	77	2.8	+2.8
Majority		121	4.4	
Turnout		2,759	28.0	−4.0
Conservative gain from Labour		Swing	Labour to Con 27.5	

=== Farnworth South ward ===
Farnworth South ward (3)
Party	Candidate	Votes	%	±%
Labour	D Gilligan	1,007	49.7	−23.3
Liberal	J Barrow	513	25.3	+25.3
Conservative	C Gregory	508	25.0	−1.9
Majority		494	24.3	
Turnout		2,028	21.0	−6.0
Labour hold		Swing	Labour to Lib 24.4	

=== Great Lever ward ===
Great Lever ward (3)
Party	Candidate	Votes	%	±%
Conservative	L Huyton	2,031	66.4	+16.4
Labour	A Perry	1,027	33.6	−16.4
Majority		1,004	32.8	
Turnout		3,058	28.0	−1.0
Conservative gain from Labour		Swing	Labour to Con 16.4	

=== Halliwell ward ===
Halliwell ward (3)
Party	Candidate	Votes	%	±%
Conservative	J Walsh	1,804	55.3	+9.5
Labour	G Riley	1,256	38.5	−15.6
National Front	J Walsh	202	6.2	+6.2
Majority		548	16.8	
Turnout		3,262	33.0	+6.0
Conservative gain from Labour		Swing	Labour to Con 12.5	

=== Heaton ward ===
Heaton ward (3)
Party	Candidate	Votes	%	±%
Conservative	B Hurst	2,038	92.2	+4.8
Labour	S Harrison	172	7.8	−4.8
Majority		1,866	84.4	
Turnout		2,210	48.0	+6.0
Conservative hold		Swing	Labour to Con 4.8	

=== Horwich North, Central and East ward ===
Horwich North, Central and East ward (3)
Party	Candidate	Votes	%	±%
Conservative	M Foster	1,434	42.6	+13.6
Labour	E Dobson	1,227	36.5	−8.6
Liberal	E Kay	703	20.9	+0.9
Majority		207	6.1	
Turnout		3,364	33.0	−9.0
Conservative gain from Labour		Swing	Labour to Con 11.1	

=== Horwich South and Blackrod ward ===
Horwich South and Blackrod ward (3)
Party	Candidate	Votes	%	±%
Conservative	J Jolley	1,271	49.2	+20.3
Labour	G Gardiner	779	30.1	−1.2
Liberal	G Farrington	534	20.7	+12.7
Majority		492	19.0	
Turnout		2,584	40.0	−18.0
Conservative gain from Labour		Swing	Labour to Con 10.7	

=== Hulton and Rumworth ward ===
Hulton and Rumworth ward (3)
Party	Candidate	Votes	%	±%
Conservative	R Carr	2,032	54.5	−4.1
Labour	D Vause	1,367	36.7	−3.4
National Front	W Roberts	293	7.9	+7.9
Independent	G Stewart	35	0.9	+0.9
Majority		665	17.8	
Turnout		3,727	37.0	+2.0
Conservative hold		Swing	Con to NF 6.0	

=== Kearsley ward ===
Kearsley ward (3)
Party	Candidate	Votes	%	±%
Liberal	D Bedford	1,188	37.5	−14.8
Labour	R Cornthwaite	1,126	35.5	−12.2
Conservative	T Rothwell	858	27.0	+27.0
Majority		62	1.9	
Turnout		3,172	37.0	−3.6
Liberal gain from Labour		Swing	Lib to Con 20.9	

=== Little Lever ward ===
Little Lever ward (3)
Party	Candidate	Votes	%	±%
Conservative	A Lawton	1,333	46.7	+6.1
Liberal	R Richardson	769	26.9	+0.3
Labour	J Robinson	753	26.4	−6.9
Majority		564	19.7	
Turnout		2,855	38.0	−1.0
Conservative hold		Swing	Labour to Con 6.5	

=== Smithills ward ===
Smithills ward (3)
Party	Candidate	Votes	%	±%
Conservative	S Collier	2,398	76.1	+3.3
Labour	N Morlidge	711	18.4	−8.9
Independent	M Taylor	214	5.5	+5.5
Majority		2,227	57.6	
Turnout		3,863	35.0	+7.0
Conservative hold		Swing	Labour to Con 6.1	

=== Tonge ward ===
Tonge ward (3)
Party	Candidate	Votes	%	±%
Conservative	J Rigby	2,396	64.4	+9.6
Labour	J Knight	1,323	35.6	−9.6
Majority		1,073	28.8	
Turnout		3,719	33.0	−1.0
Conservative hold		Swing	Labour to Con 9.6	

=== West ward ===
West ward (3)
Party	Candidate	Votes	%	±%
Conservative	D Chinn	1,017	51.1	+15.0
Labour	H Devonish	972	48.9	−15.0
Majority		45	2.3	
Turnout		1,989	24.0	
Conservative gain from Labour		Swing	Labour to Con 15.0	

=== Westhoughton East and Hulton ward ===
Westhoughton East and Hulton ward (3)
Party	Candidate	Votes	%	±%
Conservative	J Smith	1,688	74.5	+11.3
Labour	P Jones	579	25.5	−11.3
Majority		1,109	49.0	
Turnout		2,267	39.0	−9.4
Conservative hold		Swing	Labour to Con 11.3	

=== Westhoughton North, Central and South ward ===
Westhoughton North, Central and South ward (3)
Party	Candidate	Votes	%	±%
Labour	P Woodcock	1,390	52.3	−10.8
Conservative	P Hart	1,268	47.7	+25.8
Majority		122	4.6	
Turnout		2,658	37.0	−12.7
Labour hold		Swing	Labour to Con 18.3	
