= 1979 Bolton Metropolitan Borough Council election =

1979 UK local government election

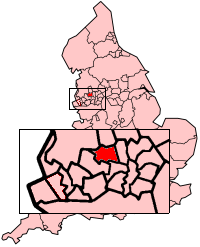
The Metropolitan Borough of Bolton shown within England.

Elections to Bolton Metropolitan Borough Council were held on 3 May 1979 on the same day as the General Election. The Conservatives retained control of the Council by a majority of 1 seat.

24 seats were contested, with 14 being won by the Labour Party, 9 by the Conservatives and 1 by the Liberal Party.

After the election, the composition of the Council was:

- Conservative 35
- Labour 33
- Liberal Party 1

== Election result ==
Bolton local election result 1979
Party	Seats	Gains	Losses	Net gain/loss	Seats %	Votes %	Votes	+/−
Conservative	9	0	10	-10		46.7	70,549	-4.2
Labour	14	10	0	+10		46.4	70,115	+4.3
Liberal	1	1	1	0		6.8	10,279	+2.1

== Ward results ==
=== Astley Bridge ward ===
Astley Bridge ward
Party	Candidate	Votes	%	±%
Conservative	A Hibbert	5,087	66.6	−7.4
Labour	E McCracken	2,546	33.4	+11.5
Majority		2541	33.2	−18.9
Turnout		7,633	78.6	+41.2
Conservative hold		Swing	Con to Labour 9.4	

=== Bradshaw North and South ward ===
Bradshaw North and South ward
Party	Candidate	Votes	%	±%
Conservative	K Howarth	4,099	73.8	−6.2
Labour	C Benjamin	1,457	26.2	+6.2
Majority		2,642	47.6	−12.4
Turnout		5,556	78.9	+47.9
Conservative hold		Swing	Con to Labour 6.2	

=== Bradford ward ===
Bradford ward
Party	Candidate	Votes	%	±%
Labour	C Skull	2,348	79.4	−7.6
Conservative	H Kolia	648	21.6	+11.8
Majority		1,700	56.7	−19.5
Turnout		2,996	74.7	+33.7
Labour hold		Swing	Labour to Con 9.7	

=== Bromley Cross, Eagley and Egerton ward ===
Bromley Cross, Eagley and Egerton ward
Party	Candidate	Votes	%	±%
Conservative	A O'Neil	4,670	36.2	
Conservative	T Mulligan	4,379	33.9	
Labour	J Mason	1,981	15.3	
Labour	M Woodcock	1,878	14.5	
Majority				
Turnout		12,908	72.9	+35.8
Conservative hold		Swing		
Conservative hold		Swing		

=== Church East and North ward ===
Church East and North ward
Party	Candidate	Votes	%	±%
Labour	J Farmer	2,270	58.4	−5.4
Conservative	M Drinkwater	1,618	41.6	+7.8
Majority		652	16.8	−13.2
Turnout		3,888	76.8	+31.8
Labour gain from Conservative		Swing	Labour to Con 6.6	

=== Darcy Lever cum Breightmet ward ===
Darcy Lever cum Breightmet ward
Party	Candidate	Votes	%	±%
Labour	K McIvor	5,203	59.1	+8.5
Conservative	A Chadbond	3,598	40.9	−6.9
Majority		1,605	18.2	+15.4
Turnout		8,801	75.3	+37.8
Labour gain from Conservative		Swing	Con to Labour 7.7	

=== Deane cum Lostock ward ===
Deane cum Lostock ward
Party	Candidate	Votes	%	±%
Conservative	R Ward	3,639	59.4	−12.4
Labour	G Harkin	1,928	31.5	+11.2
Liberal	S Roberts	563	9.2	+4.0
Majority		1,711	27.9	−23.7
Turnout		6,130	78.9	+40.1
Conservative hold		Swing	Con to Labour 11.8	

=== Derby ward ===
Derby ward
Party	Candidate	Votes	%	±%
Labour	S Walsh	3,382	76.7	+2.6
Conservative	J Shore	888	20.1	−2.9
Communist	A Johnson	139	3.2	+0.3
Majority		2,494	56.6	+5.5
Turnout		4,409	73.2	+36.2
Labour hold		Swing	Con to Labour 2.7	

=== Farnworth North ward ===
Farnworth North ward
Party	Candidate	Votes	%	±%
Labour	D Butterfield	3,152	47.8	−4.7
Conservative	D Jones	2,205	33.4	−5.7
Liberal	G Barrow	1,238	18.8	+10.5
Majority		947	14.3	+0.9
Turnout		6,595	71.4	+40.0
Labour gain from Conservative		Swing	Con to Lib 8.1	

=== Farnworth South ward ===
Farnworth South ward
Party	Candidate	Votes	%	±%
Labour	P Johnston	3,689	56.3	−4.0
Conservative	B Coote	1,598	24.4	−6.0
Liberal	L Bale	1,262	19.3	+10.0
Majority		2,091	31.9	+1.9
Turnout		6,549	70.6	+40.6
Labour hold		Swing	Con to Lib 8.0	

=== Great Lever ward ===
Great Lever ward
Party	Candidate	Votes	%	±%
Labour	L Williamson	4,408	55.1	+3.9
Conservative	L Huyton	3,598	44.9	−3.9
Majority		810	10.1	+8.2
Turnout		8,006	76.9	+42.3
Labour gain from Conservative		Swing	Con to Labour 3.9	

=== Halliwell ward ===
Halliwell ward
Party	Candidate	Votes	%	±%
Liberal	J Fish	2,972	43.2	+17.6
Labour	R Johnson	2,171	31.5	−5.6
Conservative	J Walsh	1,743	25.3	−10.2
Majority		801	11.6	
Turnout		6,886	78.0	+37.0
Liberal gain from Conservative		Swing	Con to Lib 13.9	

=== Heaton ward ===
Heaton ward
Party	Candidate	Votes	%	±%
Conservative	B Hurst	3,382	83.0	−4.6
Labour	J Jenkins	691	17.0	+4.6
Majority		2,691	66.0	−9.0
Turnout		4,073	83.6	+37.6
Conservative hold		Swing	Con to Labour 4.6	

=== Horwich North, Central and East ward ===
Horwich North, Central and East ward
Party	Candidate	Votes	%	±%
Labour	A Oakley	4,262	66.0	+18.8
Conservative	S Dawson	2,193	34.0	−18.8
Majority		2,069	32.0	
Turnout		6,455	76.2	+37.3
Labour gain from Conservative		Swing	Con to Labour 18.8	

=== Horwich South and Blackrod ward ===
Horwich South and Blackrod ward
Party	Candidate	Votes	%	±%
Labour	E Johnson	2,760	51.9	+14.0
Conservative	J Jolley	2,560	48.1	−14.2
Majority		200	3.8	N/A
Turnout		5,320	79.4	+36.5
Labour gain from Conservative		Swing	Con to Labour 14.1	

=== Hulton and Rumworth ward ===
Hulton and Rumworth ward
Party	Candidate	Votes	%	±%
Labour	T Anderton	4,046	52.7	+8.1
Conservative	R Carr	3,629	47.3	−3.6
Majority		417	5.4	
Turnout		7,675	78.2	+39.1
Labour gain from Conservative		Swing	Con to Labour 5.8	

=== Kearsley ward ===
Kearsley ward
Party	Candidate	Votes	%	±%
Labour	W Robinson	2,912	43.6	+0.6
Liberal	J Rothwell	2,158	32.3	−2.0
Conservative	J Tomlinson	1,602	24.0	+1.3
Majority		754	11.3	+2.6
Turnout		6,672	77.5	+34.2
Labour gain from Liberal		Swing	Lib to Con 1.6	

=== Little Lever ward ===
Little Lever ward
Party	Candidate	Votes	%	±%
Conservative	A Lawton	2,957	45.5	−17.4
Labour	L Sanderson	2,542	39.2	+8.2
Liberal	W Crook	993	15.3	+9.2
Majority		415	6.4	−25.5
Turnout		6,492	80.5	+41.2
Conservative hold		Swing	Con to Labour 12.8	

=== Smithills ward ===
Smithills ward
Party	Candidate	Votes	%	±%
Conservative	S Collier	4,475	52.6	−18.6
Labour	J Knight	2,932	34.5	+12.0
Liberal	D Walmsley	1,093	12.9	+6.6
Majority		1,543	18.1	−30.5
Turnout		8,500	79.3	+46.2
Conservative hold		Swing	Con to Labour 15.3	

=== Tonge ward ===
Tonge ward
Party	Candidate	Votes	%	±%
Labour	D Eastwood	4,598	53.2	+11.3
Conservative	J Rigby	4,050	46.8	−7.8
Majority		548	6.4	
Turnout		8,648	76.4	+34.7
Labour gain from Conservative		Swing	Con to Lab 9.5	

=== West ward ===
West Ward
Party	Candidate	Votes	%	±%
Labour	G Hart	3,693	66.4	+2.6
Conservative	M Kershaw	1,867	33.6	−0.5
Majority		1,826	32.8	+3.1
Turnout		5,560	70.0	+35.7
Labour gain from Conservative		Swing	Con to Lab 1.5	

=== Westhoughton East and Hulton ward ===
Westhoughton East and Hulton ward
Party	Candidate	Votes	%	±%
Conservative	J Smith	3,624	66.2	−6.1
Labour	P Jones	1,847	33.8	+6.1
Majority		1,777	32.4	−12.2
Turnout		5,471	79.9	+42.1
Conservative hold		Swing	Con to Labour 6.1	

=== Westhoughton North, Central and South ward ===
Westhoughton North, Central and South ward
Party	Candidate	Votes	%	±%
Labour	P Woodcock	3,419	58.4	−1.8
Conservative	A Prince	2,440	41.6	+1.8
Majority		979	16.8	−3.8
Turnout		5,859	75.2	+37.8
Labour hold		Swing	Labour to Con 1.8	
