= 1976 Bolton Metropolitan Borough Council election =

1976 UK local government election

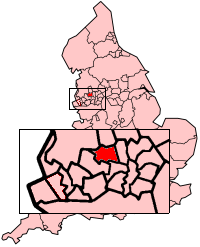
The Metropolitan Borough of Bolton shown within England.

Elections to Bolton Metropolitan Borough Council were held in May 1976. The Conservatives retained control of the Council.

23 seats were contested, with 16 being won by the Conservative Party and 7 by the Labour Party.

Ernie Crook was the sitting Conservative Councillor in the Church East and North Ward, but was re-elected as an Independent Conservative due to an internal selection dispute. However he took the Conservative Party whip soon after. Therefore, this seat is regarded as a Conservative hold rather than a loss.

After the election, the composition of the Council was:

- Conservative 46
- Labour 20
- Liberal Party 2
- Independent 1

== Election result ==
Bolton local election result 1976
Party	Seats	Gains	Losses	Net gain/loss	Seats %	Votes %	Votes	+/−
Conservative	16	4	0	+4		57.9	42,559	+1.3
Labour	7	2	4	-2		37.0	27,230	+4.4
Liberal	0	0	1	-1		3.9	2,902	-4.5
Other parties	0	0	1	-1		1.1	855	-1.2

== Ward results ==
=== Astley Bridge ward ===
Astley Bridge ward (3)
Party	Candidate	Votes	%	±%
Conservative	F Waterworth	2,871	77.5	+0.3
Labour	G Riley	832	22.5	−0.3
Majority		2,039	55.0	+0.6
Turnout		3,703	38.0	+2.0
Conservative hold		Swing	Labour to Con 0.3	

=== Bradshaw North and South ward ===
Bradshaw North and South ward (3)
Party	Candidate	Votes	%	±%
Conservative	T Greenhalgh	2,666	85.7	+35.7
Labour	A Grimes	446	14.3	+8.4
Majority		2,220	71.3	+46.0
Turnout		3,112	34.0	−12.0
Conservative hold		Swing		

=== Bradford ward ===
Bradford ward (3)
Party	Candidate	Votes	%	±%
Labour	T McEwan	1,205	68.5	+5.4
Conservative	A Mills	498	28.3	−8.6
Socialist (GB)	N Duffield	56	3.2	+3.2
Majority		707	40.2	+14.0
Turnout		1,759	37.7	+3.7
Labour hold		Swing	Con to Labour 7.0	

=== Bromley Cross, Eagley and Egerton ward ===
Bromley Cross, Eagley and Egerton ward (3)
Party	Candidate	Votes	%	±%
Conservative	A Poulsom	2,666	81.9	+24.5
Labour	C Benjamin	591	18.1	−1.4
Majority		2,075	63.7	+29.4
Turnout		3,257	38.5	−5.5
Conservative hold		Swing	Lab to Con 12.9	

=== Church East and North ward ===
Church East and North ward (3)
Party	Candidate	Votes	%	±%
Ind. Conservative	E Crook	1,227	41.1	+41.1
Conservative	B Hall	961	32.2	−30.4
Labour	P Johnson	799	26.7	−2.6
Majority		266	8.9	
Turnout		2,987	48.3	+8.3
Ind. Conservative hold		Swing		

=== Darcy Lever cum Breightmet ward ===
Darcy Lever cum Breightmet ward (3)
Party	Candidate	Votes	%	±%
Conservative	M Walsh	2,900	55.5	−4.7
Labour	K McIvor	2,327	44.5	+4.7
Majority		573	11.0	−9.4
Turnout		5,227	39.0	+8.0
Conservative gain from Labour		Swing	Con to Labour 4.7	

=== Deane cum Lostock ward ===
Deane cum Lostock ward (3)
Party	Candidate	Votes	%	±%
Conservative	F Rushton	2,260	77.7	+0.3
Labour	J Walker	648	22.3	−0.3
Majority		1,612	55.4	+0.7
Turnout		2,908	41.0	+4.0
Conservative hold		Swing	Labour to Con 0.3	

=== Derby ward ===
Derby ward (3)
Party	Candidate	Votes	%	±%
Labour	R Lever	1,170	63.8	+2.3
Conservative	D Smith	663	36.2	−2.3
Majority		507	27.6	+4.6
Turnout		1,833	31.0	+3.0
Labour hold		Swing	Con to Labour 2.3	

=== Farnworth North ward ===
Farnworth North ward (3)
Party	Candidate	Votes	%	±%
Labour	R Neary	1,428	47.7	+6.2
Conservative	A Nuttall	1,232	41.2	−4.7
Liberal	M Harmsworth	331	11.1	+1.3
Majority		196	6.5	
Turnout		2,991	31.9	+3.9
Labour hold		Swing	Con to Labour 5.4	

=== Farnworth South ward ===
Farnworth South ward (3)
Party	Candidate	Votes	%	±%
Labour	W Hardman	1,290	55.3	+5.6
Liberal	J Barrow	550	23.6	−1.7
Conservative	L Sharples	493	21.1	−3.9
Majority		740	31.7	+7.4
Turnout		2,333	25.3	+4.3
Labour hold		Swing	Con to Labour 4.7	

=== Great Lever ward ===
Great Lever ward (3)
Party	Candidate	Votes	%	±%
Conservative	S Haslam	2,283	60.3	−6.1
Labour	G Harkin	1,504	39.7	+6.1
Majority		779	20.4	−12.2
Turnout		3,787	36.0	+8.0
Conservative gain from Labour		Swing	Con to Labour 6.1	

=== Halliwell ward ===
Halliwell ward (3)
Party	Candidate	Votes	%	±%
Conservative	W Hall	1,742	55.6	+0.3
Labour	R Johnson	1,389	44.4	+5.9
Majority		353	11.2	−5.6
Turnout		3,131	32.0	−1.0
Conservative gain from Labour		Swing		

=== Heaton ward ===
Heaton ward (3)
Party	Candidate	Votes	%	±%
Conservative	J Hanscomb	1,996	90.4	−1.8
Labour	T Moor	213	9.6	+1.8
Majority		1,783	80.8	−3.6
Turnout		2,210	47.0	−1.0
Conservative hold		Swing	Con to Labour 1.8	

=== Horwich North, Central and East ward ===
Horwich North, Central and East ward (3)
Party	Candidate	Votes	%	±%
Conservative	B Crumblehulme	2,159	52.9	+10.3
Labour	J McBurnie	1,924	47.1	+10.6
Majority		235	5.8	−0.3
Turnout		4,083	40.0	+7.0
Conservative gain from Labour		Swing		

=== Horwich South and Blackrod ward ===
Horwich South and Blackrod ward (3)
Party	Candidate	Votes	%	±%
Conservative	C Everin	1,915	61.6	+12.4
Labour	L Watkinson	1,194	38.4	+7.3
Majority		721	23.2	+4.2
Turnout		3,109	48.0	+8.0
Conservative hold		Swing		

=== Hulton and Rumworth ward ===
Hulton and Rumworth ward (3)
Party	Candidate	Votes	%	±%
Conservative	A Gledhill	2,112	55.1	+0.6
Labour	P Jones	1,381	36.0	−0.7
National Front	J Walsh	341	8.9	+1.0
Majority		731	19.0	+1.2
Turnout		3,834	38.5	+1.5
Conservative hold		Swing	Labour to Con 1.6	

=== Kearsley ward ===
Kearsley ward (3)
Party	Candidate	Votes	%	±%
Labour	T Lewis	1,479	40.4	+4.9
Liberal	E Bell	1,376	37.5	−0.0
Conservative	T Rothwell	810	22.1	−4.9
Majority		103	2.9	
Turnout		3,665	42.6	+5.6
Labour gain from Liberal		Swing	Con to Labour 4.9	

=== Little Lever ward ===
Little Lever ward (3)
Party	Candidate	Votes	%	±%
Conservative	R Hodson	1,192	40.5	−6.2
Labour	E Blackwell	1,105	37.6	+11.2
Liberal	R Richardson	645	21.9	−5.0
Majority		87	2.9	−16.8
Turnout		2,942	38.0	−0.0
Conservative hold		Swing	Con to Labour 8.7	

=== Smithills ward ===
Smithills ward (3)
Party	Candidate	Votes	%	±%
Conservative	M Howarth	3,057	74.5	−1.6
Labour	G Hart	897	21.9	+3.5
Independent	B Langley	151	3.7	−1.8
Majority		2,160	52.6	−5.1
Turnout		4,105	37.9	+2.9
Conservative hold		Swing	Con to Labour 2.5	

=== Tonge ward ===
Tonge ward (3)
Party	Candidate	Votes	%	±%
Conservative	K Knowles	2,631	57.0	−7.4
Labour	Brian Iddon	1,983	43.0	+7.4
Majority		648	14.0	−14.8
Turnout		4,614	42.0	+9.0
Conservative hold		Swing	Con to Labour 7.4	

=== West ward ===
West ward (3)
Party	Candidate	Votes	%	±%
Labour	D Clarke	1,419	54.8	+5.9
Conservative	B Holland	1,171	45.2	−5.9
Majority		248	9.6	
Turnout		2,590	32.0	+8.0
Labour hold		Swing	Con to Labour 5.9	

=== Westhoughton East and Hulton ward ===
Westhoughton East and Hulton ward (3)
Party	Candidate	Votes	%	±%
Conservative	F Walsh	1,870	74.9	+0.4
Labour	C Knowles	625	25.1	−0.4
Majority		1,245	49.8	+0.9
Turnout		2,495	42.8	+3.8
Conservative hold		Swing	Labour to Con 0.4	

=== Westhoughton North, Central and South ward ===
Westhoughton North, Central and South ward (3)
Party	Candidate	Votes	%	±%
Labour	J Clee	1,331	47.2	−5.1
Conservative	J Roden	1,184	42.0	−5.7
Independent	K Brown	307	10.9	+10.9
Majority		147	5.2	+0.6
Turnout		2,822	39.8	+2.8
Labour gain from Independent		Swing	Con to Ind 8.3	
