= Clifford Morris =

British politician (1942–2022)

Leader of Bolton Council
- In office 24 May 2006 – 7 January 2018
- Preceded by: Barbara Ronson
- Succeeded by: Linda Thomas

Mayor of Bolton
- In office 2003–2004
- Preceded by: John Walsh
- Succeeded by: Prentice Howarth

Personal details
- Born: January 1942 Bolton, England
- Died: 23 June 2022 (aged 80) Bolton, England
- Party: Labour
- Spouse: Doreen Eccles
- Children: three

Clifford Morris (January 1942 – 23 June 2022) was a British Labour politician in the Metropolitan Borough of Bolton in Greater Manchester. He was the leader of Bolton Council from 2006 to 2018.

== Early life ==
Morris was born in Bolton in 1942, and married Doreen Eccles at the Hebron Hall, Mayor Street, Bolton in 1964. They have three children (Andrew, David and Helen), six grandchildren and one great grandchild; their names are (from oldest to youngest) Karen, Emma, Andrew, Callum, Rebekah, James and Amiee. Clifford worked at both the Lamplighter and Smithills Coaching House prior to the demise of both.

== Political career ==
He was elected as a Councillor for the Halliwell ward in the Metropolitan Borough of Bolton in 1983. At the 1992 general election, he stood in the Bolton West Constituency. Between 2003 and 2004, he was the ceremonial Mayor of Bolton. He served as the Leader of the Labour Group (2004–2017) and Leader of Bolton Council (2006–2018).
