= 1992 Bolton Metropolitan Borough Council election =

1992 UK local government election

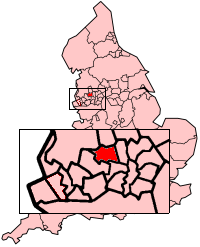
The Metropolitan Borough of Bolton shown within England

The 1992 Bolton Metropolitan Borough Council election took place on 7 May 1992 to elect members of Bolton Metropolitan Borough Council in Greater Manchester, England. One third of the council was up for election and the Labour Party kept overall control of the council.

20 seats were contested in the election: 11 were won by the Labour Party, 7 by the Conservative Party, and 2 by the Liberal Democrats. After the election, the composition of the council was as follows:

- Labour 39
- Conservative 16
- Liberal Democrats 4
- Independent Labour 1

== Election results ==
Bolton local election result 1992
| Party | Seats | Gains | Losses | Net gain/loss | Seats % | Votes % | Votes | +/− |
|---|---|---|---|---|---|---|---|---|
| Labour | 11 | 0 | 3 | -3 | | 39.6 | 27,756 | -3.4 |
| Conservative | 7 | 2 | 0 | +2 | | 42.0 | 29,420 | +7.1 |
| Liberal Democrats | 2 | 1 | 0 | +1 | | 18.3 | 12,848 | -1.4 |

== Council Composition ==
Prior to the election the composition of the council was:

↓
| 42 | 14 | 3 | 1 |
| Labour | Conservative | L | I |

After the election the composition of the council was:

↓
| 39 | 16 | 4 | 1 |
| Labour | Conservative | L | I |

LD – Liberal Democrats
I – Independent

== Ward results ==
=== Astley Bridge ward ===
Astley Bridge ward
| Party | Candidate | Votes | % | ±% |
|---|---|---|---|---|
| Conservative | D Shepherd | 3,005 | 67.3 | +12.3 |
| Labour | O Johnson | 1,155 | 25.9 | −9.6 |
| Liberal Democrats | B Hackney | 302 | 6.8 | −2.7 |
| Majority | | 1,850 | 41.5 | +21.9 |
| Turnout | | 4,462 | 41.4 | −8.5 |
| Conservative hold | | Swing | Labour to Con 12.9 | |

=== Blackrod ward ===
Blackrod ward
| Party | Candidate | Votes | % | ±% |
|---|---|---|---|---|
| Labour | E Johnson | 1,454 | 41.5 | −5.3 |
| Conservative | J Winnward | 1,328 | 37.9 | +7.3 |
| Liberal Democrats | I Hamilton | 718 | 20.5 | +2.7 |
| Majority | | 126 | 3.6 | −12.5 |
| Turnout | | 3,500 | 36.0 | −18.0 |
| Labour hold | | Swing | Labour to Con 6.3 | |

=== Bradshaw ward ===
Bradshaw ward
| Party | Candidate | Votes | % | ±% |
|---|---|---|---|---|
| Conservative | W Hall | 2,752 | 65.0 | +11.9 |
| Labour | D Hamer | 1,110 | 26.2 | −7.9 |
| Liberal Democrats | I Peacock | 374 | 8.8 | −3.9 |
| Majority | | 1,642 | 38.8 | +19.8 |
| Turnout | | 4,236 | 39.0 | −5.0 |
| Conservative hold | | Swing | Labour to Con 9.9 | |

=== Breightmet ward ===
Breightmet ward
| Party | Candidate | Votes | % | ±% |
|---|---|---|---|---|
| Labour | J Byrne | 2,012 | 53.2 | −2.4 |
| Conservative | J Martin | 1,572 | 41.5 | +8.3 |
| Liberal Democrats | S Ball | 201 | 5.3 | −5.9 |
| Majority | | 440 | 11.6 | −10.8 |
| Turnout | | 3,785 | 35.0 | −3.2 |
| Labour hold | | Swing | LD to Con 7.1 | |

=== Bromley Cross ward ===
Bromley Cross ward
| Party | Candidate | Votes | % | ±% |
|---|---|---|---|---|
| Conservative | N Critchley | 2,820 | 67.8 | +10.9 |
| Labour | A Page | 994 | 23.9 | −3.6 |
| Liberal Democrats | C Atty | 344 | 8.3 | −7.3 |
| Majority | | 1,826 | 43.9 | −14.5 |
| Turnout | | 4,158 | 40.8 | −3.6 |
| Conservative hold | | Swing | LD to Con 9.1 | |

=== Burnden ward ===
Burnden ward
| Party | Candidate | Votes | % | ±% |
|---|---|---|---|---|
| Labour | D Eastwood | 1,495 | 52.3 | −10.4 |
| Conservative | S Rae | 721 | 25.2 | +0.7 |
| Liberal Democrats | F Harasiwka | 640 | 22.4 | +9.6 |
| Majority | | 774 | 27.1 | −11.1 |
| Turnout | | 2,856 | 30.0 | −8.9 |
| Labour hold | | Swing | Labour to LD 10.0 | |

=== Central ward ===
Central ward
| Party | Candidate | Votes | % | ±% |
|---|---|---|---|---|
| Labour | R Howarth | 1,601 | 62.6 | −4.8 |
| Conservative | L Shepherd | 735 | 28.8 | +10.5 |
| Liberal Democrats | S Howarth | 220 | 8.6 | −5.8 |
| Majority | | 866 | 33.9 | −15.2 |
| Turnout | | 2,556 | 32.0 | −10.7 |
| Labour hold | | Swing | LD to Con 8.1 | |

=== Daubhill ward ===
Daubhill ward
| Party | Candidate | Votes | % | ±% |
|---|---|---|---|---|
| Labour | T Anderton | 1,515 | 60.2 | −3.8 |
| Conservative | L Waterson | 811 | 32.2 | +8.1 |
| Liberal Democrats | L Baron | 192 | 7.6 | −4.3 |
| Majority | | 704 | 27.9 | −12.0 |
| Turnout | | 2,518 | 28.7 | −12.3 |
| Labour hold | | Swing | LD to Con 6.2 | |

=== Deane-cum-Heaton ward ===
Deane-cum-Heaton ward
| Party | Candidate | Votes | % | ±% |
|---|---|---|---|---|
| Conservative | A Rushton | 3,308 | 65.1 | +9.6 |
| Labour | R Evans | 1,255 | 24.7 | −7.0 |
| Liberal Democrats | L Easterman | 519 | 10.2 | −1.4 |
| Majority | | 2,053 | 40.4 | +16.7 |
| Turnout | | 5,082 | 39.0 | −7.8 |
| Conservative hold | | Swing | Labour to Con 8.3 | |

=== Derby ward ===
Derby ward
| Party | Candidate | Votes | % | ±% |
|---|---|---|---|---|
| Labour | J Foster | 1,962 | 75.4 | −4.6 |
| Conservative | F Tebbutt | 437 | 16.8 | +4.7 |
| Liberal Democrats | M Khan | 203 | 7.8 | −0.1 |
| Majority | | 1,525 | 58.6 | −9.4 |
| Turnout | | 2,602 | 28.4 | −10.5 |
| Labour hold | | Swing | Labour to Con 4.6 | |

=== Farnworth ward ===
Farnworth ward
| Party | Candidate | Votes | % | ±% |
|---|---|---|---|---|
| Labour | N Spencer | 1,261 | 63.4 | +34.8 |
| Conservative | C Adams | 536 | 26.9 | +12.1 |
| Liberal Democrats | M Rothwell | 192 | 9.7 | +3.8 |
| Majority | | 725 | 36.5 | |
| Turnout | | 1,989 | 21.4 | −0.7 |
| Labour hold | | Swing | | |

=== Halliwell ward ===
Halliwell ward
| Party | Candidate | Votes | % | ±% |
|---|---|---|---|---|
| Labour | E Hamer | 1,690 | 54.7 | −5.2 |
| Conservative | R Pryce | 716 | 23.2 | +2.8 |
| Liberal Democrats | J Radlett | 684 | 22.1 | +2.4 |
| Majority | | 974 | 31.5 | −8.0 |
| Turnout | | 3,090 | 32.6 | −11.0 |
| Labour hold | | Swing | Labour to Con 4.0 | |

=== Harper Green ward ===
Harper Green ward
| Party | Candidate | Votes | % | ±% |
|---|---|---|---|---|
| Labour | M Clare | 1,495 | 57.9 | −6.6 |
| Conservative | H Morton | 855 | 33.1 | +13.9 |
| Liberal Democrats | P Barnett | 232 | 9.0 | −7.3 |
| Majority | | 640 | 24.8 | −20.6 |
| Turnout | | 2,582 | 25.0 | −10.2 |
| Labour hold | | Swing | LD to Con 10.6 | |

=== Horwich ward ===
Horwich ward
| Party | Candidate | Votes | % | ±% |
|---|---|---|---|---|
| Liberal Democrats | B Ronson | 2,852 | 50.4 | +14.8 |
| Labour | E Walker | 1,508 | 26.6 | −12.1 |
| Conservative | J Berry | 1,302 | 23.0 | −2.8 |
| Majority | | 1,344 | 23.8 | |
| Turnout | | 5,662 | 50.0 | −4.0 |
| Liberal Democrats gain from Labour | | Swing | Labour to LD 13.4 | |

=== Hulton Park ward ===
Hulton Park ward
| Party | Candidate | Votes | % | ±% |
|---|---|---|---|---|
| Conservative | C Higson | 2,516 | 59.8 | +9.0 |
| Labour | T Hyams | 1,165 | 27.7 | −2.7 |
| Liberal Democrats | C Cooper | 529 | 12.6 | −6.2 |
| Majority | | 1,351 | 32.1 | +11.7 |
| Turnout | | 4,210 | 35.6 | −9.0 |
| Conservative hold | | Swing | LD to Con 7.6 | |

=== Kearsley ward ===
Kearsley ward
| Party | Candidate | Votes | % | ±% |
|---|---|---|---|---|
| Labour | J Alker | 1,514 | 48.4 | −2.9 |
| Liberal Democrats | J Rothwell | 1,199 | 38.3 | +3.4 |
| Conservative | P Briscoe | 415 | 13.3 | −0.4 |
| Majority | | 315 | 10.1 | −6.3 |
| Turnout | | 3,128 | 31.6 | −10.3 |
| Labour hold | | Swing | Labour to LD 3.1 | |

=== Little Lever ward ===
Little Lever ward
| Party | Candidate | Votes | % | ±% |
|---|---|---|---|---|
| Conservative | C Churchman | 1,851 | 51.9 | +4.0 |
| Labour | K Cunliffe | 1,485 | 41.6 | +0.7 |
| Liberal Democrats | W Crook | 233 | 6.5 | −4.7 |
| Majority | | 366 | 10.3 | N/A |
| Turnout | | 3,569 | 33.5 | −14.5 |
| Conservative gain from Labour | | Swing | LD to Con 4.3 | |

=== Smithills ward ===
Smithills ward
| Party | Candidate | Votes | % | ±% |
|---|---|---|---|---|
| Liberal Democrats | R Hayes | 2,075 | 56.8 | +1.1 |
| Conservative | G Gibson | 1,147 | 31.4 | +4.5 |
| Labour | M Hanif | 411 | 11.3 | −1.9 |
| Independent | S Graeme | 20 | 0.5 | −3.7 |
| Majority | | 928 | 25.4 | −3.4 |
| Turnout | | 3,653 | 42.0 | −13.0 |
| Liberal Democrats hold | | Swing | Lab to Con 3.2 | |

=== Tonge ward ===
Tonge ward
| Party | Candidate | Votes | % | ±% |
|---|---|---|---|---|
| Labour | M McFadden | 1,477 | 44.6 | −2.2 |
| Conservative | I Hardman | 1,352 | 40.9 | +11.9 |
| Liberal Democrats | B Dunning | 479 | 14.5 | −9.7 |
| Majority | | 125 | 3.8 | −14.0 |
| Turnout | | 3,308 | 39.0 | −7.0 |
| Labour hold | | Swing | LD to Con 10.8 | |

=== Westhoughton ward ===
Westhoughton ward
| Party | Candidate | Votes | % | ±% |
|---|---|---|---|---|
| Conservative | G Twist | 1,241 | 40.0 | +9.9 |
| Labour | L Thomas | 1,201 | 38.7 | −1.2 |
| Liberal Democrats | D Wilkinson | 660 | 21.3 | −8.7 |
| Majority | | 40 | 1.3 | |
| Turnout | | 3,102 | 38.5 | −5.5 |
| Conservative gain from Labour | | Swing | LD to Con 9.3 | |
