= 2011 Bolton Metropolitan Borough Council election =

2011 UK local government election

Results of the 2011 Bolton Metropolitan Borough Council election

Elections to Bolton Metropolitan Borough Council were held on 5 May 2011, along with the 2011 United Kingdom Alternative Vote referendum. One third of the council was up for election, with each successful candidate to serve a four-year term of office, expiring in 2015.

21 seats were contested, including 2 seats in the Horwich North East ward following Barbara Ronson's resignation. The Labour Party won 15 seats, whilst the Conservatives won 5 and the Liberal Democrats 1.

The Labour Party gained overall control of the council for the first time since 2003.

After the election, the composition of the council was as follows:

- Labour 35
- Conservative 20
- Liberal Democrats 5

== Election result ==
Bolton local election result 2011
Party	Seats	Gains	Losses	Net gain/loss	Seats %	Votes %	Votes	+/−
Labour	15	5	0	+5		49.3	38,148	+9.8
Conservative	5	0	2	-2		33.2	25,745	-0.7
Liberal Democrats	1	0	3	-3		12.7	9,801	-8.7
Green	0	0	0	0	0	3.6	2,762	+1.4
BNP	0	0	0	0	0	0.4	299	-1.1
Independent	0	0	0	0	0	0.9	692	-0.8

== Council Composition ==
Prior to the election the composition of the council was:

↓
30	22	8
Labour	Conservative	Lib Dems

After the election the composition of the council was:

↓
35	20	5
Labour	Conservative	Lib Dems

== Ward results ==
=== Astley Bridge ward ===
Astley Bridge ward
Party	Candidate	Votes	%	±%
Conservative	Paul Vernon Wild	1,982	46.1	−0.4
Labour	Asif Ismail Ibrahim	1,481	34.5	+5.0
Independent	Neville Mercer	430	10.00	+4.3
Astley Bridge First	Stuart Anthony Lever	202	4.7	+4.7
Liberal Democrats	Clive Richard Atty	202	4.7	−13.5
Majority		501	11.6	−5.2
Turnout		4,297	42.9	−26.2
Conservative gain from Ind. Conservative		Swing	LD to Labour 9.2	

=== Bradshaw ward ===
Bradshaw ward
Party	Candidate	Votes	%	±%
Conservative	Diana Brierley	2,328	55.7	+2.0
Labour	Kate Challender	1,567	37.5	+10.6
Liberal Democrats	Stephen Frederick Howarth	285	6.8	−10.1
Majority		761	18.1	−8.6
Turnout		4,209	47.7	−24.4
Conservative hold		Swing	LD to Labour 10.4	

=== Breightmet ward ===
Breightmet ward
Party	Candidate	Votes	%	±%
Labour	John Byrne	2,045	60.2	+10.6
Conservative	Sandra MacNeill	1,176	34.6	−0.1
Liberal Democrats	Tracey Odessa Kane	176	5.2	−10.4
Majority		869	25.4	+10.6
Turnout		3,420	36.0	−23.2
Labour hold		Swing	LD to Labour 10.5	

=== Bromley Cross ward ===
Bromley Cross ward
Party	Candidate	Votes	%	±%
Conservative	Norman Andrew Wilkinson	2,821	59.7	+5.2
Labour	Tony Muscat	1,244	26.3	+3.5
Green	Rosa Sarah Shaw	336	7.1	+3.2
Liberal Democrats	Christopher Atty	327	6.9	−11.6
Majority		1,577	33.2	+1.8
Turnout		4,755	45.0	−29.0
Conservative hold		Swing	LD to Con 8.4	

=== Crompton ward ===
Crompton ward
Party	Candidate	Votes	%	±%
Labour	Guy J. Harkin	2,403	68.7	+6.4
Conservative	Gareth James Morris	713	20.4	−1.6
Green	Alex Shaw	218	6.2	+6.2
Liberal Democrats	Gabrielle McDowall	164	4.7	−10.9
Majority		1,690	48.0	+7.7
Turnout		3,522	35.1	−26.6
Labour hold		Swing	LD to Labour 10.6	

=== Farnworth ward ===
Farnworth ward
Party	Candidate	Votes	%	±%
Labour	Jean Gillies	1,855	68.8	+15.9
Conservative	Ibby Ismail	383	14.2	−6.8
Green	Diana Hayes	231	8.6	+3.3
Liberal Democrats	Wendy Connor	226	8.4	−11.7
Majority		1,472	54.0	+32.0
Turnout		2,726	25.5	−20.4
Labour hold		Swing	LD to Labour 13.8	

=== Great Lever ward ===
Great Lever ward
Party	Candidate	Votes	%	±%
Labour	Madeline Murray	2,282	68.5	+19.0
Conservative	Anjani Kumar	612	18.4	−13.0
Liberal Democrats	Aqeel Akhtar	241	7.2	−6.5
Green	David William Collins	198	5.9	+1.2
Majority		1,670	49.5	−31.3
Turnout		3,375	35.5	−22.8
Labour hold		Swing	Con to Labour 16.0	

=== Halliwell ward ===
Halliwell ward
Party	Candidate	Votes	%	±%
Labour	Linda Carol Thomas	2,235	75.8	+10.7
Conservative	Joylon Horton Greenhalgh	377	12.8	−4.2
Green	Ian David McHugh	195	6.6	+6.6
Liberal Democrats	Francine Godfrey	143	4.8	−13.0
Majority		1,858	62.6	+15.3
Turnout		2,969	33.1	−22.0
Labour hold		Swing	LD to Labour 11.8	

=== Harper Green ward ===
Harper Green ward
Party	Candidate	Votes	%	±%
Labour	Margaret Clare	1,918	69.2	+24.6
Conservative	Jay Patel	616	22.2	+4.8
Liberal Democrats	David Arthur Connor	236	8.5	−14.7
Majority		1,302	45.2	+23.7
Turnout		2,881	30.0	−24.0
Labour hold		Swing	LD to Labour 19.6	

=== Heaton and Lostock ward ===
Heaton and Lostock ward
Party	Candidate	Votes	%	±%
Conservative	Bob Allen	3,175	62.0	+4.7
Labour	John William Gillatt	1,394	27.2	+2.9
Liberal Democrats	Christine Joyce MacPherson	316	6.2	−9.4
Green	Hannah Louisa Middleton	240	4.7	+2.4
Majority		1,781	34.6	+1.5
Turnout		5,149	48.5	−27.1
Conservative hold		Swing	LD to Con 7.0	

=== Horwich and Blackrod ward ===
Horwich and Blackrod ward
Party	Candidate	Votes	%	±%
Labour	Lindsey Ann Kell	1,851	49.1	+11.3
Conservative	John Raymond Birchall Barrow	1,425	37.8	+3.0
Green	Graham Chadwick	281	7.4	+1.3
Liberal Democrats	Philip Andrew Kane	215	5.7	−14.9
Majority		426	11.2	
Turnout		3,804	39.7	−26.2
Labour gain from Conservative		Swing	LD to Labour 13.1	

=== Horwich North East ward ===
Two seats were up for election in this ward.

Horwich North East ward
Party	Candidate	Votes	%	±%
Labour	Joyce Kellett	1,869	24.6	
Labour Co-op	Richard Silvester	1,526	20.2	
Liberal Democrats	Stephen Michael Rock	1,217	16.0	
Conservative	Carol Ann Forshaw	1,135	14.9	
Liberal Democrats	Kenneth Thomson	1,017	13.4	
Conservative	Peter Sloan	837	11.0	
Majority		(Kellett) 652		
Majority		(Silvester) 309		
Labour gain from Liberal Democrats				
Labour Co-op gain from Liberal Democrats				

=== Hulton ward ===
Hulton ward
Party	Candidate	Votes	%	±%
Conservative	Philip John Ashcroft	1,671	46.4	−0.8
Labour	Shafaqat Shaikh	1,369	38.0	+6.3
Green	James Tomkinson	344	9.6	+3.6
Liberal Democrats	Matthew David Tyas Cooper	215	6.0	−8.6
Majority		302	8.4	−7.2
Turnout		3,599	36.7	−25.1
Conservative hold		Swing	LD to Labour 7.4	

=== Kearsley ward ===
Kearsley ward
Party	Candidate	Votes	%	±%
Labour	Liam Irving	1,630	52.4	+6.0
Liberal Democrats	Margaret Patricia Rothwell	953	30.6	−0.2
Conservative	Michelle Ionn	529	17.0	−5.8
Majority		677	21.5	+5.9
Turnout		3,144	30.2	−26.3
Labour gain from Liberal Democrats		Swing	Con to Labour 5.9	

=== Little Lever and Darcy Lever ward ===
Little Lever and Darcy Lever ward
Party	Candidate	Votes	%	±%
Labour	Anthony Connell	1,988	50.0	+18.4
Conservative	Rees Gibbon	1,057	26.6	−1.2
Liberal Democrats	Eric John Hyde	714	18.0	−2.8
Green	Alwynne Cartmell	217	5.5	+3.0
Majority		931	23.3	+19.6
Turnout		3,992	41.2	−24.8
Labour hold		Swing	LD to Labour 10.6	

=== Rumworth ward ===
Rumworth ward
Party	Candidate	Votes	%	±%
Labour	Ebrahim Adia	2,677	77.1	+7.1
Conservative	Ruth Kenny	374	10.8	−3.9
Green	Alan Johnson	300	8.6	+8.6
Liberal Democrats	David Charles Tyas Cooper	119	3.4	−11.8
Majority		2,303	66.4	+11.6
Turnout		3,470	34.6	−21.4
Labour hold		Swing	LD to Green 10.2	

=== Smithills ward ===
Smithills ward
Party	Candidate	Votes	%	±%
Liberal Democrats	Carole R. Swarbrick	1,642	40.0	−0.7
Labour	Sean Francis Harkin	1,344	32.8	+7.6
Conservative	Christine Deidre Porter	913	22.3	−1.9
Green	Rachel Elizabeth Mann	202	4.9	+2.6
Majority		298	7.2	−8.4
Turnout		4,125	41.6	−25.7
Liberal Democrats hold		Swing	Con to Labour 4.7	

=== Tonge with the Haulgh ward ===
Tonge with the Haulgh ward
Party	Candidate	Votes	%	±%
Labour	Elaine Sherrington	1,714	55.2	+7.2
Conservative	Kath Kavanagh	933	30.0	+2.7
BNP	Dorothee Sayers	299	9.6	−0.5
Liberal Democrats	Paul Anthony Harasiwka	160	5.2	−9.3
Majority		781	25.0	+4.3
Turnout		3,124	35.1	−22.6
Labour hold		Swing	LD to Labour 8.2	

=== Westhoughton North and Chew Moor ward ===
Westhoughton North and Chew Moor ward
Party	Candidate	Votes	%	±%
Labour	Christopher Peacock	2,038	47.8	+17.4
Conservative	Patricia Allen	1,837	43.1	+5.1
Liberal Democrats	Patricia Cooper	392	9.2	−18.8
Majority		201	4.7	
Turnout		4,304	39.3	−28.3
Labour gain from Conservative		Swing	LD to Labour 18.1	

=== Westhoughton South ward ===
Westhoughton South ward
Party	Candidate	Votes	%	±%
Labour	David Andrew Chadwick	1,718	49.5	+14.9
Conservative	Michael Baker	851	24.5	−1.8
Liberal Democrats	Derek John Gradwell	841	24.2	−5.1
Independent	Glenn George Kaalman	60	1.7	+1.7
Majority		933	26.2	+20.9
Turnout		3,562	37.1	−26.4
Labour hold		Swing	LD to Labour 10.0	
