= 1998 Bolton Metropolitan Borough Council election =

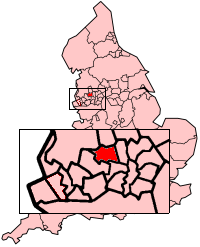
The Metropolitan Borough of Bolton shown within England.

The 1998 Bolton Metropolitan Borough Council election took place on 7 May 1998 to elect members of Bolton Metropolitan Borough Council in Greater Manchester, England. One third of the council was up for election and the Labour Party kept overall control of the council.

20 seats were contested in the election, with 15 being held by Labour, 3 by the Liberal Democrats and 2 by the Conservatives. The three main parties contested all of the 20 seats, with three Socialist Labour Party and four other candidates standing.

The election saw the lowest turnout in at least 30 years at 23.5%, a significant drop from the 36.8% turnout in the 1996 election. Farnworth ward saw the lowest turnout at 15%, while the highest was 32.6% in Astley Bridge. The Conservatives gained 2 seats in the election to become the main opposition party on the council again. They gained Astley Bridge and Bradshaw wards from Labour, having defeated the Labour candidate in Bradshaw by 2 votes after 5 recounts. However Labour held on in Kearsley by 8 votes and won Westhoughton from the Liberal Democrats to remain firmly in control of the council.

After the election, the composition of the council was:

- Labour 47
- Conservative 8
- Liberal Democrat 5

== Election result ==
Bolton local election result 1998
Party	Seats	Gains	Losses	Net gain/loss	Seats %	Votes %	Votes	+/−
Labour	14	1	2	-1	70.0	47.2	23,549	-6.9
Conservative	4	2	0	+2	20.0	30.3	15,127	+5.3
Liberal Democrats	2	0	1	-1	10.0	19.5	9,715	-0.1
Other parties	0	0	0		10.0	3.0	1,503	+3.0

== Council Composition ==
Prior to the election the composition of the council was:

↓
48	6	6
Labour	Conservative	L

After the election the composition of the council was:

↓
47	8	5
Labour	Conservative	L

LD - Liberal Democrats

== Ward results ==
=== Astley Bridge ward ===
Astley Bridge ward
Party	Candidate	Votes	%	±%
Conservative	J Walsh	1,742	49.0	+4.7
Labour	S Hynes	1,576	42.9	−2.7
Liberal Democrats	P Howarth	285	8.0	−2.0
Majority		216	6.1	
Turnout		3,553	32.6	−6.7
Conservative gain from Labour		Swing	Labour to Con 3.7	

=== Blackrod ward ===
Blackrod ward
Party	Candidate	Votes	%	±%
Labour	J Monaghan	987	38.7	−4.4
Conservative	R Barrow	743	29.1	+6.7
Independent Labour	L Watkinson	553	21.7	−1.2
Liberal Democrats	D Watts	267	10.5	−1.1
Majority		434	17.0	−3.3
Turnout		2,550	25.1	−12.0
Labour hold		Swing	Labour to Con 5.5	

=== Bradshaw ward ===
Bradshaw ward
Party	Candidate	Votes	%	±%
Conservative	A Osborn	1,242	44.2	+3.9
Labour	L Byrne	1,240	44.1	−4.0
Liberal Democrats	M Eidlow	327	11.6	−0.1
Majority		2	0.1	
Turnout		2,809	25.8	−8.3
Conservative gain from Labour		Swing	Labour to Con 3.9	

=== Breightmet ward ===
Breightmet ward
Party	Candidate	Votes	%	±%
Labour	M Murray	1,155	59.7	−12.9
Conservative	P Brierley	565	29.2	+12.5
Liberal Democrats	E Hill	214	11.1	+0.4
Majority		590	30.5	−25.4
Turnout		1,934	19.2	−9.3
Labour hold		Swing	Labour to Con 12.7	

=== Bromley Cross ward ===
Bromley Cross ward
Party	Candidate	Votes	%	±%
Conservative	D Carr	2,028	60.4	+11.9
Labour	E Sherrington	1,041	31.0	−10.7
Liberal Democrats	C Atty	287	8.6	−1.2
Majority		987	29.4	−22.5
Turnout		3,356	31.0	−9.7
Conservative hold		Swing	Labour to Con 11.3	

=== Burnden ward ===
Burnden ward
Party	Candidate	Votes	%	±%
Labour	P Howarth	1,223	66.3	−3.7
Conservative	S Jackson	359	19.4	+3.8
Liberal Democrats	D Connor	264	14.3	−0.2
Majority		864	46.8	−7.6
Turnout		1,846	19.3	−9.1
Labour hold		Swing	Labour to Con 3.7	

=== Central ward ===
Central ward
Party	Candidate	Votes	%	±%
Labour	J Noble	1,355	68.6	−9.0
Conservative	L Beresford	411	20.8	+3.9
Liberal Democrats	K Watts	127	6.4	+0.9
Independent	R Allen	81	4.1	+4.1
Majority		944	47.8	−12.9
Turnout		1,974	25.1	−8.9
Labour hold		Swing	Labour to Ind 6.5	

=== Daubhill ward ===
Daubhill ward
Party	Candidate	Votes	%	±%
Labour	G Harkin	1,055	63.2	−13.7
Conservative	F Taylor	368	22.1	+7.6
Liberal Democrats	L Greensitt	181	10.9	+2.3
Socialist Labour	D Kelly	64	3.8	+3.8
Majority		687	41.2	−21.1
Turnout		1,668	18.9	−11.5
Labour hold		Swing	Labour to Con 10.6	

=== Deane-cum-Heaton ward ===
Deane-cum-Heaton ward
Party	Candidate	Votes	%	±%
Conservative	C Shaw	2,184	57.2	+8.6
Labour	J Lavin	1,186	31.1	−7.2
Liberal Democrats	L Greenhalgh	446	11.7	−1.4
Majority		998	26.8	+16.5
Turnout		3,716	28.8	−8.5
Conservative hold		Swing	Labour to Con 7.9	

=== Derby ward ===
Derby ward
Party	Candidate	Votes	%	±%
Labour	G Riley	1,765	78.7	−5.1
Conservative	R Wood	307	13.7	+3.4
Liberal Democrats	L Bale	172	7.7	+1.7
Majority		1458	65.0	−13.5
Turnout		2,244	24.3	−11.3
Labour hold		Swing	Labour to Con 4.2	

=== Farnworth ward ===
Farnworth ward
Party	Candidate	Votes	%	±%
Labour	P Johnston	903	63.5	−18.5
Liberal Democrats	M Rothwell	197	13.8	+4.9
Conservative	P Bonomy	180	12.6	+3.5
Socialist Labour	W Kelly	143	10.0	+10.0
Majority		706	49.6	−23.3
Turnout		1,423	15.2	−9.1
Labour hold		Swing	Labour to Soc Lab 14.2	

=== Halliwell ward ===
Halliwell ward
Party	Candidate	Votes	%	±%
Labour	M Kilcoyne	1,353	63.7	−3.1
Conservative	J Evans	414	19.5	+6.2
Liberal Democrats	S Howarth	356	16.8	−3.1
Majority		939	44.2	−2.7
Turnout		2,123	22.7	−7.3
Labour hold		Swing	Labour to Con 4.6	

=== Harper Green ward ===
Harper Green ward
Party	Candidate	Votes	%	±%
Labour	L Williamson	1,012	63.9	−14.8
Conservative	S Kesler	266	16.8	+4.2
Liberal Democrats	W Connor	154	9.7	+1.0
Socialist Labour	W Kelly	152	9.6	+9.6
Majority		746	47.1	−19.1
Turnout		1,584	15.5	−7.9
Labour hold		Swing	Labour to Soc Lab 12.2	

=== Horwich ward ===
Horwich ward
Party	Candidate	Votes	%	±%
Liberal Democrats	R Ronson	1,963	55.0	−3.4
Labour	S Pasquill	1,005	28.2	+5.5
Conservative	I Cooper	598	16.8	−3.1
Majority		958	26.9	−8.7
Turnout		3,566	31.0	−12.0
Liberal Democrats hold		Swing	LD to Labour 4.4	

=== Hulton Park ward ===
Hulton Park ward
Party	Candidate	Votes	%	±%
Labour	E Hyland	2,156	48.4	+6.5
Conservative	M Perks	1,363	30.6	−4.7
Ind. Conservative	C Higson	511	11.5	+11.5
Liberal Democrats	D Gradwell	421	9.5	−13.3
Majority		793	17.8	+11.2
Turnout		4,451	24.1	−9.4
Labour hold		Swing	LD to Ind Con 12.4	

=== Kearsley ward ===
Kearsley ward
Party	Candidate	Votes	%	±%
Labour	P Spencer	1,023	45.9	−15.8
Liberal Democrats	J Rothwell	1,015	45.5	+13.6
Conservative	J Tyler	193	8.7	+2.3
Majority		8	3.6	−26.1
Turnout		2,231	21.7	−8.0
Labour hold		Swing	Labour to LD 14.7	

=== Little Lever ward ===
Little Lever ward
Party	Candidate	Votes	%	±%
Labour	A Connell	1,498	58.2	−3.7
Conservative	D Bailey	855	33.2	+1.7
Liberal Democrats	W Crook	220	8.6	+2.0
Majority		643	25.0	−5.4
Turnout		2,573	27.5	−9.2
Labour hold		Swing	Labour to LD 2.8	

=== Smithills ward ===
Smithills ward
Party	Candidate	Votes	%	±%
Liberal Democrats	R Hayes	1,676	61.5	+5.4
Labour	M Ord	567	20.8	−3.0
Conservative	D Bagnall	483	17.7	−2.4
Majority		1,109	40.7	+8.4
Turnout		2,726	32.1	−11.8
Liberal Democrats hold		Swing	Labour to LD 4.2	

=== Tonge ward ===
Tonge ward
Party	Candidate	Votes	%	±%
Labour	F White	1,499	66.7	−3.5
Conservative	S Lever	567	25.2	+5.6
Liberal Democrats	M Whittaker	182	8.1	−2.1
Majority		932	41.4	−9.2
Turnout		2,248	28.3	−5.3
Labour hold		Swing	Labour to Con 4.5	

=== Westhoughton ward ===
Westhoughton ward
Party	Candidate	Votes	%	±%
Labour	D Chadwick	924	44.3	−4.1
Liberal Democrats	D Wilkinson	905	43.3	+1.3
Conservative	S Wallen	259	12.4	+2.7
Majority		19	0.9	−5.5
Turnout		2,088	23.6	−13.2
Labour gain from Liberal Democrats		Swing	Labour to Con 3.4	

== Sources ==
=== References ===
- Rallings, Colin; Thrasher, Michael. "Bolton Metropolitan Borough Council Election Results 1973–2012" (PDF). The Elections Centre. The Elections Centre, Plymouth University.
