= 2004 Bolton Metropolitan Borough Council election =

2004 UK local government election

Results of the 2004 Bolton Metropolitan Borough Council election

Elections to Bolton Metropolitan Borough Council were held on 10 June 2004. The whole council was up for election with boundary changes since the last election in 2003. The council stayed under no overall control, with the Liberal Democrats overtaking the Labour Party, by 1 seat, as the largest party and assuming control of the council from Labour. Overall turnout was 43.5%.

== Election result ==
Bolton local election result 2004
Party	Seats	Gains	Losses	Net gain/loss	Seats %	Votes %	Votes	+/−
Liberal Democrats	21			+7	35.0	29.9	68,281	+0.9%
Labour	20			-7	33.3	31.9	72,917	-3.2%
Conservative	19			0	31.7	36.9	84,371	+2.8%
Green	0	0	0	0	0	0.3	770	+0.0%
Socialist Labour	0	0	0	0	0	0.3	675	-0.5%
Respect	0	0	0	0	0	0.2	540	+0.2%
UKIP	0	0	0	0	0	0.2	495	+0.2%
Independent	0	0	0	0	0	0.2	412	+0.2%

|}

== Council Composition ==
Prior to the election the composition of the council was:

↓
27	19	14
Labour	Conservative	Lib Dems

After the election the composition of the council was:

↓
20	19	21
Labour	Conservative	Lib Dems

== Ward results ==
=== Astley Bridge ward ===
Astley Bridge ward (3)
Party	Candidate	Votes	%	±%
Conservative	Hilary Fairclough	2,574	21.4	
Conservative	Stuart Lever	2,377	19.8	
Conservative	John Walsh	2,341	19.5	
Labour	June Crook	997	8.3	
Liberal Democrats	Anne Warren	854	7.1	
Labour	Muhammad Rafiq	791	6.6	
Liberal Democrats	Ronald Halliwell	655	5.5	
Liberal Democrats	Jaleh Salari	627	5.2	
Labour	Christopher White	491	4.1	
Socialist Labour	Howard Broadbent	308	2.6	
Turnout		12,015	40.0	

=== Bradshaw ward ===
Bradshaw ward (3)
Party	Candidate	Votes	%	±%
Conservative	Walter Hall	2,579	20.7	
Conservative	Diana Brierley	2,420	19.4	
Conservative	Paul Brierley	2,418	19.4	
Labour	Janice Sutton	1,011	8.1	
Liberal Democrats	Stephen Howarth	996	8.0	
Labour	Paul Sedgwick	989	7.9	
Liberal Democrats	Tracy Ward	750	6.0	
Liberal Democrats	Frances Thomas	686	5.5	
Labour	Mohammed Ayub	620	5.0	
Turnout		12,469	45.0	

=== Breightmet ward ===
Breightmet ward (3)
Party	Candidate	Votes	%	±%
Conservative	Robert Wilkinson	1,631	15.2	
Labour	John Bryne	1,554	14.5	
Labour	Lynda Byrne	1,492	13.9	
Conservative	James Hinegan	1,471	13.7	
Conservative	Richard Elliott	1,459	13.6	
Labour	Donald Grime	1,419	13.2	
Liberal Democrats	Edward Hill	695	6.5	
Liberal Democrats	Rosalind Harasiwka	510	4.8	
Liberal Democrats	Franko Harasiwka	494	4.6	
Turnout		10,725	35.0	

=== Bromley Cross ward ===
Bromley Cross ward (3)
Party	Candidate	Votes	%	±%
Conservative	Alan Wilkinson	3,315	21.9	
Conservative	Norman Critchley	3,286	21.7	
Conservative	Donald Carr	3,257	21.5	
Labour	Jeremy Foster	1,043	6.9	
Labour	Anthony Muscat Terribile	997	6.6	
Liberal Democrats	Clive Atty	938	6.2	
Labour	Susan Whittle	890	5.9	
Liberal Democrats	Lesley Easterman	782	5.2	
Liberal Democrats	Bernard McCartin	614	4.1	
Turnout		15,122	48.0	

=== Crompton ward ===
Crompton ward (3)
Party	Candidate	Votes	%	±%
Liberal Democrats	Iqbal Patel	2,258	17.9	
Liberal Democrats	Stewart Ball	2,225	17.7	
Liberal Democrats	Valibhai Patel	2,043	16.2	
Labour	R Howarth	1,135	9.0	
Conservative	Donald Fairclough	954	7.6	
Labour	Mohammed Alli	929	7.4	
Conservative	Winifred Wilkinson	902	7.2	
Conservative	Jolyon Coombs	874	6.9	
Labour	Ibrahim Kala	820	6.5	
Socialist Labour	Lynne Lowe	231	1.8	
Independent	Anthony Backhouse	228	1.8	
Turnout		12,599	43.0	

=== Farnworth ward ===
Farnworth ward (3)
Party	Candidate	Votes	%	±%
Labour	James Lord	1,484	17.9	
Labour	Raymond Stones	1,454	17.5	
Labour	Anthony Spencer	1,334	16.1	
Liberal Democrats	Anthony Brooks	899	10.8	
Conservative	Peter Taylor	733	8.8	
Liberal Democrats	David Connor	723	8.7	
Liberal Democrats	Sara McGeehan	616	7.4	
Conservative	Talib Hussain	530	6.5	
Conservative	Mohammed Iqbal	525	6.3	
Turnout		8,298	27.0	

=== Great Lever ward ===
Great Lever ward (3)
Party	Candidate	Votes	%	±%
Conservative	Ansar Hussain	1,487	14.2	
Conservative	Mohammad Idrees	1,439	13.8	
Labour	Prentice Howarth	1,400	13.4	
Labour	Martin Donaghy	1,399	13.4	
Labour	Champak Mistry	1,306	12.5	
Conservative	Neil Germaine	1,275	12.2	
Liberal Democrats	Catherine Toft	765	7.3	
Liberal Democrats	Maria Garcia	734	7.0	
Liberal Democrats	Simon Toft	652	6.2	
Turnout		10,457	38.0	

=== Halliwell ward ===
Halliwell ward (3)
Party	Candidate	Votes	%	±%
Labour	Clifford Morris	2,012	19.6	
Labour	Linda Thomas	1,944	18.9	
Labour	Akhtar Zaman	1,918	18.7	
Liberal Democrats	Martin McLoughlin	831	8.1	
Conservative	Mohammad Hanif	811	7.9	
Liberal Democrats	Asif Vali	740	7.2	
Liberal Democrats	Yakub Patel	726	7.1	
Conservative	Maureen Coombs	678	6.6	
Conservative	Robert Ionn	602	5.9	
Turnout		10,262	35.0	

=== Harper Green ward ===
Harper Green ward (3)
Party	Candidate	Votes	%	±%
Labour	George Dennis	1,272	15.1	
Labour	Margaret Clare	1,196	14.2	
Labour	Laurence Williamson	1,195	14.1	
Conservative	Robert Tyler	860	10.2	
Liberal Democrats	Geoffrey Willis	839	9.9	
Liberal Democrats	Wendy Connor	838	9.9	
Liberal Democrats	Laura Baron	791	9.4	
Conservative	Ethel Kenny	740	8.8	
Conservative	Frederick Taylor	716	8.5	
Turnout		8,447	30.0	

=== Heaton and Lostock ward ===
Heaton and Lostock ward (3)
Party	Candidate	Votes	%	±%
Conservative	Frank Rushton	3,485	21.3	
Conservative	Robert Allen	3,445	21.1	
Conservative	Colin Shaw	3,419	20.9	
Liberal Democrats	David Cooper	1,080	6.6	
Liberal Democrats	Thomas Swarbrick	1,046	6.4	
Labour	Barbara Sharples	1,043	6.4	
Labour	John Gillatt	1,027	6.3	
Liberal Democrats	Christine MacPherson	988	6.0	
Labour	Ghulam Raja	806	4.9	
Turnout		16,339	53.0	

=== Horwich and Blackrod ward ===
Horwich and Blackrod ward (3)
Party	Candidate	Votes	%	±%
Liberal Democrats	Ian Hamilton	1,455	12.9	
Liberal Democrats	Martyn Cox	1,357	12.0	
Liberal Democrats	John Cronnolley	1,324	11.7	
Labour	Isabel Seddon	1,283	11.3	
Conservative	John Barrow	1,266	11.2	
Conservative	Michael Hollick	1,241	11.0	
Labour	Keith Bowes	1,182	10.5	
Labour	Kevan Helsby	1,155	10.2	
Conservative	Thomas Ashton	1,047	9.3	
Turnout		11,310	42.0	

=== Horwich North East ward ===
Horwich North East ward (3)
Party	Candidate	Votes	%	±%
Liberal Democrats	Barbara Ronson	2,720	21.0	
Liberal Democrats	Robert Ronson	2,685	20.8	
Liberal Democrats	Stephen Rock	1,887	14.6	
Conservative	Oliver Fairhurst	1,066	8.2	
Conservative	Peter Baxendale	982	7.6	
Conservative	Stephen Wallen	958	7.4	
Labour	James Kilcoyne	890	6.9	
Labour	Madeline Murray	871	6.7	
Labour	Joyce Kellett	866	6.7	
Turnout		12,925	46.0	

=== Hulton ward ===
Hulton ward (3)
Party	Candidate	Votes	%	±%
Conservative	Alan Walsh	1,827	15.3	
Conservative	Phillip Ashcroft	1,752	14.7	
Conservative	Andrew Morgan	1,711	14.3	
Labour	Thomas Fitzpatrick	1,423	11.9	
Labour	Guy Harkin	1,380	11.6	
Labour	Michael Francis	1,281	10.7	
Liberal Democrats	Linden Greensitt	937	7.8	
Liberal Democrats	Joseph Hayes	862	7.2	
Liberal Democrats	Kieran McGeehan	771	6.5	
Turnout		11,944	41.0	

=== Kearsley ward ===
Kearsley ward (3)
Party	Candidate	Votes	%	±%
Liberal Democrats	John Rothwell	1,807	19.6	
Liberal Democrats	Margaret Rothwell	1,769	19.2	
Liberal Democrats	William Collison	1,616	17.5	
Labour	Derek Burrows	1,144	12.4	
Labour	Maureen Barlow	919	10.0	
Labour	Peter Johnston	905	9.8	
Conservative	George Hardman	379	4.1	
Conservative	Sheila Kesler	352	3.8	
Conservative	Barry Noble	342	3.7	
Turnout		9,233	33.0	

=== Little Lever and Darcy Lever ward ===
Little Lever and Darcy Lever ward (3)
Party	Candidate	Votes	%	±%
Conservative	Mary Woodward	1,671	14.3	
Labour	Anthony Connell	1,642	14.1	
Labour	Maurenn Connell	1,630	14.0	
Conservative	David Broadie	1,536	13.2	
Labour	Sean Hornby	1,532	13.1	
Conservative	Jason Tyler	1,252	10.7	
Liberal Democrats	William Crook	718	6.2	
Liberal Democrats	Christine Goodier	530	4.5	
Green	Alwynne Cartmell	491	4.2	
Liberal Democrats	Pauline Grimshaw	385	3.3	
Green	Alan Johnson	279	2.4	
Turnout		11,666	44.0	

=== Rumworth ward ===
Rumworth ward (3)
Party	Candidate	Votes	%	±%
Labour	Rosa Kay	1,734	15.6	
Labour	Ebrahim Adia	1,706	15.3	
Labour	Ismail Ibrahim	1,683	15.1	
Liberal Democrats	Rashid Jangharia	1,316	11.8	
Liberal Democrats	Gulamali Jiva	1,228	11.0	
Liberal Democrats	James Woodrow	991	8.9	
Conservative	John Heyes	633	5.7	
Conservative	Albert Brandwood	598	5.4	
Conservative	Sydney Palmer	567	5.1	
Respect	Neil McAlister	540	4.9	
Socialist Labour	Dorothy Entwistle	136	1.2	
Turnout		11,132	38.0	

=== Smithills ward ===
Smithills ward (3)
Party	Candidate	Votes	%	±%
Liberal Democrats	Roger Hayes	2,277	18.8	
Liberal Democrats	Carole Swarbrick	2,176	18.0	
Liberal Democrats	Richard Silvester	1,919	15.9	
Conservative	Dennis Bray	995	8.2	
Conservative	Douglas Bagnall	909	7.5	
Conservative	John Batley	846	7.0	
Labour	Andrew Page	766	6.3	
Labour	Robert Bradley	764	6.3	
Labour	Mary Page	753	6.2	
UKIP	Michael Ford	495	4.1	
Independent	James Pendlebury	184	1.5	
Turnout		12,084	42.0	

=== Tonge with The Haulgh ward ===
Tonge with The Haulgh ward (3)
Party	Candidate	Votes	%	±%
Labour	Frank White	1,818	18.0	
Labour	Elaine Sherrington	1,779	17.6	
Labour	Nicholas Peel	1,721	17.0	
Conservative	Nigel Ford	1,282	12.7	
Conservative	David Greenhalgh	1,214	12.0	
Conservative	Kevan Ward	1,168	11.5	
Liberal Democrats	Mary Eidlow	472	4.7	
Liberal Democrats	Michael Langdon	378	3.7	
Liberal Democrats	Tanwir Taj Din	292	2.9	
Turnout		10,124	37.0	

=== Westhoughton North and Chew Moor ward ===
Westhoughton North and Chew Moor ward (3)
Party	Candidate	Votes	%	±%
Liberal Democrats	Derek Gradwell	1,537	13.0	
Liberal Democrats	Arthur Price	1,532	13.0	
Liberal Democrats	James Gilfillan	1,456	12.3	
Conservative	Kay Rushton	1,317	11.1	
Conservative	Jane Frappola	1,279	10.8	
Conservative	Philip Gore	1,277	10.8	
Labour	David Chadwick	1,269	10.7	
Labour	Kevin McManmon	1,154	9.8	
Labour	David Holden-Locke	993	9.4	
Turnout		11,814	43.0	

=== Westhoughton South ward ===
Westhoughton South ward (3)
Party	Candidate	Votes	%	±%
Liberal Democrats	David Wilkinson	1,645	17.3	
Liberal Democrats	John Ainscough	1,468	15.5	
Liberal Democrats	Julia Silvester	1,376	14.5	
Labour	Barbara Ramsden	1,017	10.7	
Labour	Trevor Leese	860	9.1	
Labour	Valerie Leese	829	8.7	
Conservative	Michael Pepper	800	8.4	
Conservative	Betty Joyce	764	8.0	
Conservative	Salvatore Frappola	737	7.8	
Turnout		9,496	36.0	

== Sources ==
=== References ===
- Rallings, Colin; Thrasher, Michael. "Bolton Metropolitan Borough Council Election Results 1973–2012" (PDF). The Elections Centre. The Elections Centre, Plymouth University.
