= Laurence Robertson =

British politician (born 1958)

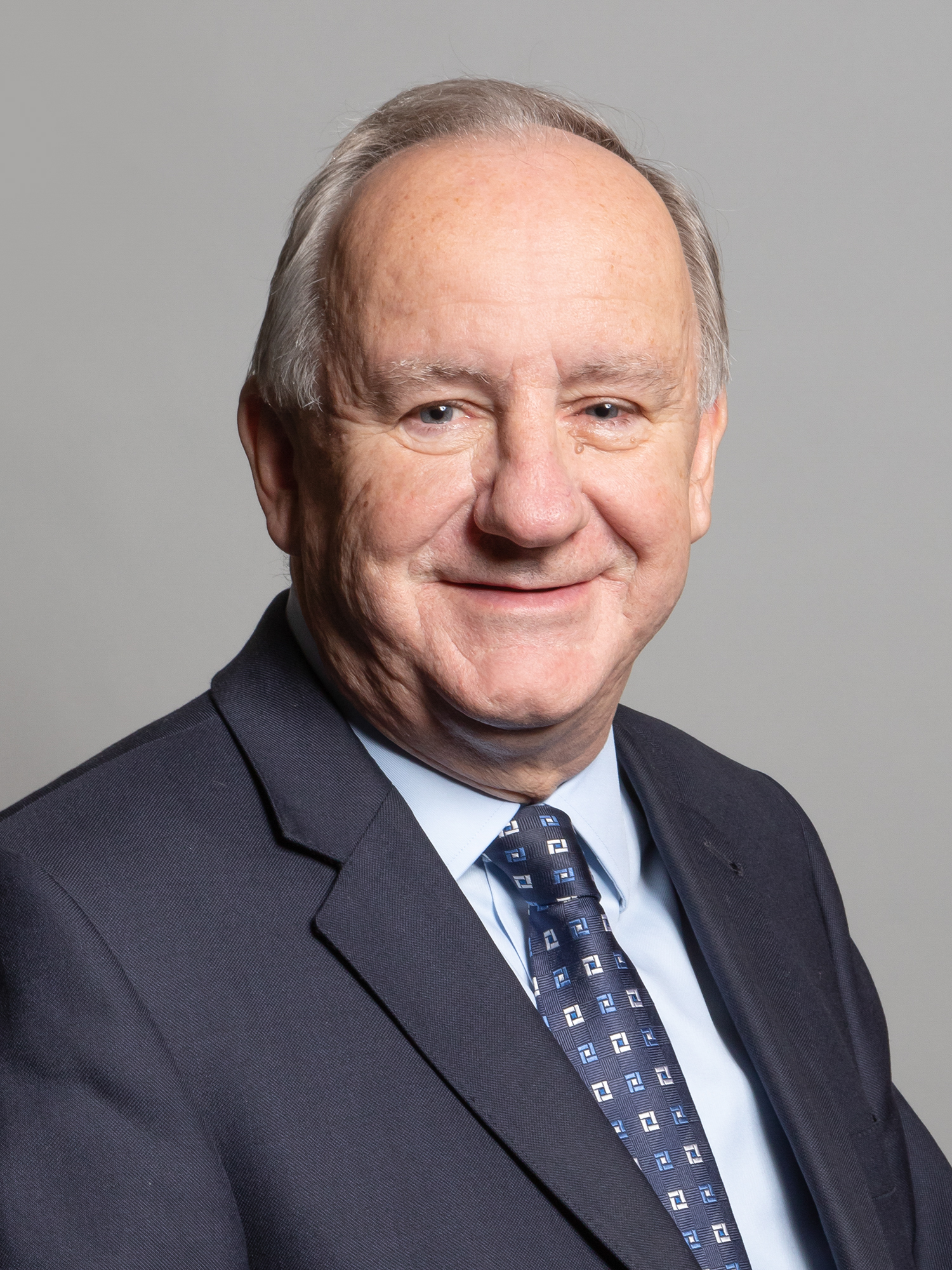
- Official portrait, 2020

Chair of the Northern Ireland Affairs Select Committee
- In office 9 June 2010 – 12 July 2017
- Preceded by: Sir Patrick Cormack
- Succeeded by: Andrew Murrison

Member of Parliament for Tewkesbury
- In office 1 May 1997 – 30 May 2024
- Preceded by: Constituency established
- Succeeded by: Cameron Thomas

Personal details
- Born: 29 March 1958 (age 68) Bolton, Lancashire, England
- Party: Conservative
- Spouses: Susan Lees (m. 1989; div. 2005) Annie Adams (m. 2015)
- Education: Bolton Institute of Higher Education

Laurence Anthony Robertson (born 29 March 1958) is a British politician who served as the Member of Parliament (MP) for Tewkesbury from 1997 to 2024. A member of the Conservative Party, he chaired the Northern Ireland Affairs Committee for seven years, from 2010 to 2017.

== Early life and education ==
Laurence Robertson was born on 29 March 1958 in Bolton, Lancashire. His father was a miner, a postman, a delivery man then a milkman. His mother was an office worker in Manchester.

He was educated at St James's C.E. Secondary Modern School and at Farnworth Grammar School, both located in Farnworth. He the studied at Bolton Institute of Higher Education (now the University of Bolton), gaining a diploma in Management Services.

== Early career ==
Before entering Parliament, Robertson held a number of roles which included working as a charity fundraiser, public relations consultant, company director, factory owner from 1987 to 1988, industrial management consultant from 1983 to 1989, and work study engineer from 1977 to 1983.

From 1988 to 1991, Robertson was Chairman of Governors of a primary school, a visitor for Victim Support Scheme, and the area chairman for the Campaign for Law and Order.

== Political career ==
Robertson was an unsuccessful candidate when he stood for Bolton Council in the Derby ward in 1983 and in the Burnden ward in 1986. At the 1987 general election, Robertson stood unsuccessfully as the Conservative candidate in Makerfield, finishing second with 27.3% of the vote behind the Labour candidate Ian McCartney. Robertson also stood unsuccessfully in Ashfield at the 1992 general election, finishing second with 32.6% of the vote behind the Labour candidate Geoff Hoon.

== Parliamentary career ==
=== 1st parliament (1997–2001) ===
At the 1997 general election, Robertson was elected as the Member of Parliament for Tewkesbury, winning with 45.8% of the vote and a majority of 9,234. Robertson stood on "an unashamedly British ticket, fighting against European federalism and stressing the need for and benefits of preserving the United Kingdom of Great Britain and Northern Ireland." He made his maiden speech on 21 May 1997, during the Referendums (Scotland and Wales) Bill, in which he spoke out against devolution.

In May 2001, Robertson ignored James Cran's advice not to publicly express support for John Townend. Robertson endorsed Townend's controversial remarks about race on BBC's Newsnight saying that Townend's remarks were "basically true" and "having too many people in different multi-racial groups makes society very difficult to manage, especially in certain parts of the country. It is not that easy to manage that kind of society". Robertson was forced to apologise after being given an ultimatum to either apologise, retract his remarks, and promise not to repeat them or to be stripped of the Conservative party whip. He was reported to have told colleagues that he received a lot of support, and was told by the chairman of his Tewkesbury constituency that he should not have backed down.

=== 2nd parliament (2001–2005) ===
At the 2001 general election, Robertson was re-elected as MP for Tewkesbury with an increased vote share of 46.1% and a decreased majority of 8,663 votes. After the election, Robertson was appointed an Opposition Whip.

In June 2003, he was made Shadow Minister for Trade and Industry. In November 2003, Robertson was appointed a Shadow Minister for Economic Affairs and from May 2005, he served as the Shadow Minister for Northern Ireland. He was not given a ministerial position in the 2010 Parliament, but served as chair of the Northern Ireland Affairs Committee until July 2017 when Andrew Murrison succeeded Robertson as chair.

Between 2004 and 2005, Robertson led a successful campaign to save Alderman Knight, a local special education school for children additional learning difficulties, complex needs and Autistic Spectrum Disorders (ASD) from closure.

On 24 March 2005, the Schools Adjudicator ruled that Alderman Knight would close. During a question to the Minister of Education on the matter of special schools in the House of Commons that day, Robertson accused Minister for Children, Young People and Families Margaret Hodge of providing an "inadequate" and "dishonest" answer after failing to mention the school in her figures. When ordered by Speaker Michael Martin to withdraw the remark, Robertson declined, stating: "Mr Speaker, I am here to represent my constituents. I will not withdraw that remark." He was therefore asked to leave the chamber.

=== 3rd parliament (2005–2010) ===
Robertson was again re-elected at the 2005 general election, with an increased vote share of 49.1% and an increased majority of 9,892 votes.

Following the 2007 floods in Tewkesbury, Robertson spoke out against building on flood plains. An issue that Robertson raised once again to Secretary of State for Environment, Food and Rural Affairs in February 2020 following heavy flooding in his constituency. Robertson was Vice Chair of the All-Party Parliamentary Group on Flood Prevention, and continued to lobby the then government on the issue of flooding.

=== 4th parliament (2010–2015) ===
At the 2010 general election, Robertson was again re-elected, with a decreased vote share of 47.2% and a decreased majority of 6,310 votes. After the election, Robertson served as chair of the Northern Ireland Affairs Committee until July 2017.

During the expenses scandal, it was flagged that between 2001 and 2011, Robertson had claimed more than £1 million in MP's expenses and criticised plans to overhaul the system of claims for MPs.

In December 2014, Robertson along with six other male Conservative Party MPs voted against the Equal Pay (Transparency) Bill which would require all companies with more than 250 employees to declare the gap in pay between the average male and average female salaries.

=== 5th parliament (2015–2017) ===
At the 2015 general election, Robertson was again re-elected, with an increased vote share of 54.5% and an increased majority of 21,972 votes.

In March 2016, Robertson was accused of "cash for access" after it was reported that he sponsored a parliamentary pass for a lobbyist, Jennifer Bryant-Pearson, in 2014 whose company paid him £7,500 for consultancy advice in 2009 and 2010. Robertson was paid between £9,000 and £10,000 a year by the environmental services company Veolia, which is among Bryant-Pearson's major clients. Robertson went onto clarify: "I received and registered payments from Westminster Parliamentary Research, the last of which was received by me on 28th May 2010. Jennifer Bryant-Pearson held a Parliamentary pass through me from 6th January 2014 to 30th March 2015. There was therefore a gap of almost four years between the ending of my consultancy work with the company and her obtaining a pass".

=== 6th parliament (2017–2019) ===
At the snap 2017 general election, Robertson was again re-elected with an increased vote share of 60% and an increased majority of 22,574 votes.

In 2019, Robertson along with his colleagues, led a successful campaign to save Cheltenham's Accident and Emergency Department from closure.

=== 7th parliament (2019–2024) ===
At the 2019 general election, Robertson was again re-elected, with a decreased vote share of 58.4% and a decreased majority of 22,410 votes.

As a result of the COVID-19 pandemic, Cheltenham A&E was temporarily closed. On 30 September 2020, Robertson brought the issue to light during Prime Minister's Questions, asking the prime minister to ensure the return of the A&E at Cheltenham General Hospital, to which the Prime Minister confirmed that the closure was a "temporary measure".

In October 2020, Robertson spoke out against the IPSA proposed pay rise for Members of Parliament in a statement on his website.

Robertson began a job at the Betting and Gaming Council in October 2020 as the parliamentary advisor on sport and safer gambling. He is paid £2,000 for 10 hours of work a month, equivalent to £24,000 a year. He lost his Tewkesbury seat at the 2024 general election to the Liberal Democrat candidate, Cameron Thomas.

== Views ==
=== Northern Ireland ===
Robertson notes that although "the events in the Province [Northern Ireland] didn't immediately affect me, they had an impact on my thinking and ended up having an enormous influence on my career."

In Parliament, Robertson was Chairman of the Northern Ireland Affairs Select Committee between 2010 and 2017. The committee contained 13 members, including members from the Conservative and Labour Parties, the DUP, UUP, and SDLP. During his time as chair, the subjects of the inquiries and reports included the Saville Inquiry (Bloody Sunday), the Letters of Comfort Inquiry, Corporation Tax, Banking, Leaving the EU and others.

Robertson was also Chairman of the British Irish Parliamentary Assembly between 2012 and 2016. This group included MPs and Lords, as well as TDs and Senators, from both British and Irish Parliaments, as well as members of the devolved administrations.

In 2017, Robertson received a Metropolitan Police shield for his work championing IRA bomb victims. Robertson continues to lead calls for compensation to be given to victims of IRA attacks that used Libyan explosives.

Robertson created the All-party parliamentary group on the Union in September 2019 which seeks "To promote the economic, social, cultural and constitutional benefits of the union of the United Kingdom of Great Britain and Northern Ireland; To foster good relations between the four countries of the UK and their devolved administrations; and for connected purposes". He is chairman of the group.

=== Brexit ===
A strong Eurosceptic, Robertson campaigned for John Redwood in the Conservative leadership contest in 1995 and as of 2012 was active in the EU pressure group Better Off Out. He is a member of the pressure group The Freedom Association.

In mid-November 2018, following publication of the draft UK Brexit Withdrawal Agreement, Robertson submitted to the Chairman of the 1922 Committee of the Conservative Party a letter confirming he had no confidence in the Conservative Party leader and Prime Minister Theresa May. Robertson became the first of a long list to confirm his letter, after the government announced details of its draft Withdrawal Agreement with the EU.

=== Africa ===
Throughout his life, Robertson has had a particular interest in Africa.

He is a member of multiple All-party parliamentary groups (APPGs) for African nations, including: Chairman of the APPG for Ethiopia and Djibouti, Vice Chairman of the APPG for Angola and Vice Chairman of the APPG for Nigeria.

As Chairman of the APPG for Ethiopia, Robertson has worked with the Ethiopian Embassy, committing to further strengthen Ethio-UK relations in the UK.

=== UK–Africa trade ===
In October 2020, Robertson was appointed as the Prime Minister's Trade Envoy to Angola and Zambia. Robertson is one of 29 trade envoys covering 67 markets who are appointed by the Prime Minister to promote trade and encourage investment within the UK.

Before being appointed, Robertson led trade missions across the African continent. Notable trips include his missions to Nigeria, Rwanda, Uganda and Ethiopia and Djibouti.

Outside of Parliament, Robertson is chairman of the Westminster Africa Business Group, who bring together both business and political activities across Africa to encourage trade relationships.

The group regularly hold events at the House of Commons, including lunches, receptions and other meeting attended by businesses, ministers, MPs, ambassadors and High Commissioners from both the UK and Africa.

== Post-parliamentary career ==
Following his defeat at the 2024 UK General Election, Robertson founded, and has worked as a Director, at public affairs consultancy Theoc Consultancy. In March 2025, Tortoise Media published an investigation which suggested that Robertson has used his parliamentary pass to meet with shadow ministers since the election, linking these meetings to his lobbying work.

== Personal life ==
Robertson is a practising Christian. In May 1989, Robertson married Susan Lees at All Saints Church in Farnworth. By 2011 he was estranged from his wife and with a new partner.

On 7 February 2015, Robertson married Annie Adams, in St Mary Undercroft by the Chaplain to the Speaker of the House of Commons. The couple live in Tewkesbury and own a pair of award-winning Miniature Dachshunds.

In July 2024, Robertson and his wife founded Theoc Consultancy Ltd, a political consultancy company.

Parliament of the United Kingdom
New constituency	Member of Parliament for Tewkesbury; 1997–2024	Succeeded by Cameron Thomas
