= Michael Fidler =

British politician (1916–1989)

Michael M. Fidler (10 February 1916 – 5 September 1989) was a British Conservative Party politician.

Educated at Salford Grammar School, Fidler was Member of Parliament (MP) for Bury and Radcliffe from 1970 until the October 1974 general election, when he lost his seat to Labour's Frank White.

In the 1974 election, Fidler was targeted by the neo-Nazi British Movement.

Fidler was also the first Jewish mayor in Prestwich. Active in the Jewish community for many years, he was president of the Board of Deputies of British Jews from 1967 until 1973. He founded the lobby group Conservative Friends of Israel.

== Sources ==
- Times Guide to the House of Commons October 1974
- Obituary, The Jewish Chronicle, 8 September 1989 p. 18

Parliament of the United Kingdom
Preceded by David Ensor	Member of Parliament for Bury and Radcliffe; 1970–Oct. 1974	Succeeded by Frank White
