= David Ensor (politician) =

Politician and actor (1906–1987)

Alick Charles David Ensor (27 November 1906 – 5 February 1987) was a British lawyer, actor, author and Labour Party politician.

== Legal career ==
Ensor was the son of Charles William Ensor, a surgeon, and his wife Helen Margaret Creighton Ensor. Following education at Westminster School, Ensor was admitted as a solicitor in 1928, finding employment with Newcastle upon Tyne City Council in 1932. His talents as a prosecutor led to his becoming prosecuting solicitor for the Metropolitan Police in 1935 as well as a lecturer at Hendon Police College. In 1938 he was appointed Clerk of the Peace for the County of London.

With the outbreak of the Second World War Ensor was attached to the adjutant general's staff, as part of the British Expeditionary Force. As the force withdrew, Ensor was placed in charge of evacuating wounded soldiers and civilians through the port of Boulogne. On his return to London he was granted sick leave from the army. In September 1940, he was court martialled on twenty-nine charges: he was acquitted of scandalous conduct unbecoming the character of an officer and a gentleman, of absenting himself without leave, and of leaving his pistol and ammunition unguarded; but was found guilty of thirteen charges involving the use of dishonoured cheques leading to "the prejudice of good order and military discipline". During the trial it emerged that while officially on sick leave Ensor had been entertaining a number of women and leading an extravagant lifestyle which he did not have the funds to support. He resigned as clerk of the peace, and the incident effectively ended his legal career in England.

== Broadcaster and actor ==
After the war, Ensor briefly practiced law in Brussels before moving back to England in 1948, taking up farming in Dorset. This led to the publication of his well-received book, Thirty Acres and a Cow (1955) and its follow up, I was a Public Prosecutor (1958). The success of the second book resulted in him being selected to chair Granada Television's The Verdict is Yours programme. Appearing as Mr Justice Ensor he presided over dramatised cases which argued in front of a jury of viewers.

He became a well-known figure on television, taking acting roles in a number of films including The Trials of Oscar Wilde (1960), Information Received (1961) and The Pot Carriers (1962).

== Member of Parliament ==
By the early 1960s, Ensor's acting career had stalled, and he entered politics. He joined the Labour Party and was elected at the 1964 general election as Member of Parliament (MP) for the marginal Bury and Radcliffe constituency and re-elected in the 1966 election. In 1968 he indicated that he would not contest the seat again, standing down at the 1970 general election. In 1972 he joined the Liberal Party, but did not stand for election again.

== Personal life and death ==
Ensor was twice married. The first marriage was to Norah Russell in 1932, with whom he had three children. Following their divorce, he married Vivienne Mason in 1944. He died at his home in Argelès-sur-Mer, France in 1987, aged 80.

Parliament of the United Kingdom
Preceded by John Bidgood	Member of Parliament for Bury and Radcliffe; 1964–1970	Succeeded by Michael Fidler
