= 1986 Bolton Metropolitan Borough Council election =

1986 UK local government election

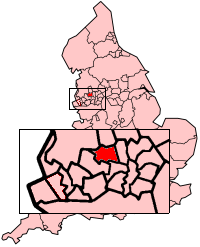
The Metropolitan Borough of Bolton shown within England

The 1986 Bolton Metropolitan Borough Council election took place on 8 May 1986 to elect members of Bolton Metropolitan Borough Council in Greater Manchester, England. One third of the council was up for election and the Labour Party kept overall control of the council.

20 seats were contested in the election: 12 were won by the Labour Party, 5 by the Conservative Party, 2 by the Liberal Party and 1 by the Social Democratic Party After the election, the composition of the council was:

- Labour 38
- Conservative 17
- Liberal Party 4
- Social Democratic Party 1

== Election result ==
Bolton local election result 1986
Party	Seats	Gains	Losses	Net gain/loss	Seats %	Votes %	Votes	+/−
Labour	12	3	1	+2		45.6	36,817	-1.9
Conservative	5	0	3	-3		31.4	25,307	-3.3
Alliance	3	3	2	+1		22.7	18,323	+5.0

== Council Composition ==
Prior to the election the composition of the council was:

↓
36	20	4
Labour	Conservative	L

After the election the composition of the council was:

↓
38	17	5
Labour	Conservative	L

L – Liberal / SDP Alliance

== Ward results ==
=== Astley Bridge ward ===
Astley Bridge ward
Party	Candidate	Votes	%	±%
Conservative	D Shepherd	2,328	51.6	−2.5
Labour	L Lee	1,520	33.7	+1.0
SDP	D Lee	663	14.7	+1.5
Majority		808	17.9	−7.3
Turnout		4,511	44.5	+4.1
Conservative hold		Swing	Con to SDP 2.0	

=== Blackrod ward ===
Blackrod ward
Party	Candidate	Votes	%	±%
Labour	J Monaghan	1,641	46.0	−8.8
Conservative	J Barrow	1,257	35.3	+0.0
SDP	D Boyes	463	13.0	+3.0
Independent Labour	L Watkinson	206	5.7	+5.7
Majority		384	15.0	−4.5
Turnout		3,565	37.2	−1.0
Labour hold		Swing	Labour to SDP 5.9	

=== Bradshaw ward ===
Bradshaw ward
Party	Candidate	Votes	%	±%
Conservative	B Tetlow	2,174	48.7	−4.6
Labour	J Sherrington	1,268	28.4	+0.5
Liberal	A Steele	1,026	23.0	+4.2
Majority		906	20.3	−5.2
Turnout		4,468	41.0	=5.0
Conservative hold		Swing	Con to Liberal 4.4	

=== Breightmet ward ===
Breightmet ward
Party	Candidate	Votes	%	±%
Labour	C Benjamin	2,066	53.1	+1.0
Conservative	G Kearton	1,249	32.1	−4.6
Liberal	D Poole	578	14.8	+3.7
Majority		817	21.0	+5.6
Turnout		3,893	34.8	−3.2
Labour hold		Swing	Con to Liberal 4.1	

=== Bromley Cross ward ===
Bromley Cross ward
Party	Candidate	Votes	%	±%
Conservative	B Hurst	1,988	42.3	−9.2
Labour	D Doxsey	1,369	29.1	+3.5
SDP	C Moore	1,348	28.7	+5.8
Majority		619	13.1	−12.8
Turnout		4,705	45.0	+3.0
Conservative hold		Swing	Con to SDP 7.5	

=== Burnden ward ===
Burnden ward
Party	Candidate	Votes	%	±%
Labour	P Howarth	1,874	54.5	+1.8
Conservative	L Robertson	1,115	32.4	−7.3
Liberal	P Howarth	452	13.1	+5.5
Majority		759	22.0	+8.9
Turnout		3,441	39.0	−2.0
Labour hold		Swing	Con to Liberal 6.4	

=== Central ward ===
Central ward
Party	Candidate	Votes	%	±%
Labour	B Iddon	2,480	74.8	+3.3
Conservative	M Kershaw	569	17.2	−0.8
Liberal	S Vickers	265	8.0	−2.5
Majority		1,911	57.7	+4.3
Turnout		3,314	40.4	+1.1
Labour hold		Swing	Liberal to Labour 2.9	

=== Daubhill ward ===
Daubhill ward
Party	Candidate	Votes	%	±%
Labour	G Harkin	2,387	64.3	+1.0
Conservative	J Cosgrove	897	24.2	−5.7
Liberal	R Ronson	429	11.6	+6.8
Majority		1,490	40.1	+6.5
Turnout		3,713	39.6	−4.9
Labour hold		Swing	Con to Liberal 6.2	

=== Deane-cum-Heaton ward ===
Deane-cum-Heaton ward
Party	Candidate	Votes	%	±%
Conservative	B Allanson	2,963	54.1	−3.9
Labour	G Smith	1,335	24.4	+3.1
SDP	I Hamilton	1,177	21.5	+0.8
Majority		1,628	29.7	−7.0
Turnout		5,475	42.0	+2.5
Conservative hold		Swing	Con to Labour 3.5	

=== Derby ward ===
Derby ward
Party	Candidate	Votes	%	±%
Labour	G Riley	3,175	82.5	+1.4
Conservative	P Small	407	10.6	−2.7
SDP	C Kay	267	6.9	+1.2
Majority		2,768	71.9	+4.1
Turnout		3,849	39.6	+0.9
Labour hold		Swing	Con to Labour 2.0	

=== Farnworth ward ===
Farnworth ward
Party	Candidate	Votes	%	±%
Labour	P Johnston	1,897	67.6	−11.1
Liberal	L Sanderson	536	19.1	−2.2
Conservative	S Windsor	375	13.4	+13.4
Majority		1,361	48.5	−8.8
Turnout		2,808	29.8	+0.9
Labour hold		Swing	Labour to Con 12.2	

=== Halliwell ward ===
Halliwell ward
Party	Candidate	Votes	%	±%
Labour	J Kilcoyne	2,022	47.0	+2.6
Liberal	A Halliwell	1,556	36.2	−1.4
Conservative	A Cole	721	16.8	−1.2
Majority		466	10.8	
Turnout		4,299	43.7	+1.7
Labour gain from Liberal		Swing	Liberal to Labour 2.0	

=== Harper Green ward ===
Harper Green ward
Party	Candidate	Votes	%	±%
Labour	L Williamson	2,442	69.5	+4.4
Conservative	A Hickson	644	18.3	+8.8
Liberal	J Robinson	429	12.2	−13.2
Majority		1,798	51.1	11.4
Turnout		3,515	33.6	−1.6
Labour hold		Swing	Liberal to Con 11.0	

=== Horwich ward ===
Horwich ward
Party	Candidate	Votes	%	±%
SDP	B Ronson	2,000	37.9	+23.5
Labour	P Senior	1,914	36.3	−8.7
Conservative	G Howard	1,366	25.9	−13.0
Majority		86	1.6	
Turnout		5,280	47.4	+3.8
SDP gain from Labour		Swing	Con to SDP 18.2	

=== Hulton Park ward ===
Hulton Park ward
Party	Candidate	Votes	%	±%
Liberal	S Mather	1,690	39.7	+25.4
Conservative	F Rushton	1,567	36.8	−16.2
Labour	C Higgs	1,005	23.6	−9.1
Majority		123	2.9	
Turnout		4,262	40.2	
Liberal gain from Conservative		Swing	Con to Liberal 20.9	

=== Kearsley ward ===
Kearsley ward
Party	Candidate	Votes	%	±%
Labour	F Hampson	1,990	50.9	−5.4
Liberal	J Rothwell	1,541	39.4	+23.7
Conservative	A Longmire	378	9.7	−18.3
Majority		449	11.5	−16.8
Turnout		3,909	40.1	+0.3
Labour gain from Liberal		Swing	Con to Liberal 21.0	

=== Little Lever ward ===
Little Lever ward
Party	Candidate	Votes	%	±%
Conservative	A Lawton	1,991	45.9	+3.4
Labour	S Marsland	1,881	43.4	−6.2
SDP	A Howroft	461	10.6	+2.6
Majority		110	2.5	
Turnout		4,333	46.8	+6.8
Conservative hold		Swing	Labour to Con 4.8	

=== Smithills ward ===
Smithills ward
Party	Candidate	Votes	%	±%
Liberal	Mary Rankine Mason	2,065	49.8	+4.8
Conservative	E Holland	1,449	34.9	−6.5
Labour	P McFadden	633	15.3	+1.7
Majority		606	14.6	+11.0
Turnout		4,147	46.9	−0.1
Liberal gain from Conservative		Swing	Con to Liberal 5.6	

=== Tonge ward ===
Tonge ward
Party	Candidate	Votes	%	±%
Labour	F White	2,774	64.3	+9.9
Conservative	A Chadbond	1,237	28.7	−10.0
SDP	W Woodburn	302	7.0	+0.1
Majority		1,637	37.9	+22.2
Turnout		4,313	46.3	+2.6
Labour gain from Conservative		Swing	Con to Labour 9.9	

=== Westhoughton ward ===
Westhoughton ward
Party	Candidate	Votes	%	±%
Labour	P Jones	1,144	40.0	−9.9
Liberal	P Mather	1,075	37.7	−12.3
Conservative	J Cowburn	632	22.2	+22.2
Majority		68	2.3	
Turnout		2,851	41.0	+3.4
Labour hold		Swing	Liberal to Con -17.2	
