= Bury and Radcliffe =

Parliamentary constituency in the United Kingdom, 1950–1983

- Former borough constituency for the House of Commons
- County: Lancashire, until 1974; Greater Manchester, from 1974
- Major settlements: Bury and Radcliffe

1950–1983
- Seats: One
- Created from: Bury; Heywood and Radcliffe
- Replaced by: Bury North; Bury South

Bury and Radcliffe was a parliamentary constituency centred on the towns of Bury and Radcliffe in North West England. It returned one Member of Parliament (MP) to the House of Commons of the Parliament of the United Kingdom. It was a Conservative seat until the 1964 General Election when Labour won it for the first time.

The constituency was created for the 1950 general election, and abolished for the 1983 general election, when it was split into two new constituencies – Bury North and Bury South.

== Boundaries ==
Bury and Radcliffe in Lancashire, boundaries used 1974–1983

The County Borough of Bury, the Borough of Radcliffe, and the Urban District of Tottington.

== Members of Parliament ==
Election	Member	Party
1950	Walter Fletcher	Conservative
1955	John Bidgood	Conservative
1964	David Ensor	Labour
1970	Michael Fidler	Conservative
Oct 1974	Frank White	Labour
1983	constituency abolished: see Bury North & Bury South	

== Election results ==
=== Elections in the 1950s ===
General election 1950: Bury and Radcliffe
Party	Candidate	Votes	%
Conservative	Walter Fletcher	26,485	45.8
Labour	John Owen	25,705	44.4
Liberal	Colin Hindley	5,662	9.8
Majority		780	1.4
Turnout		57,852	87.0
Conservative win (new seat)			

General election 1951: Bury and Radcliffe
Party	Candidate	Votes	%	±%
Conservative	Walter Fletcher	29,949	51.6	+5.8
Labour	Lewis Wright	28,058	48.4	+4.0
Majority		1,891	3.2	+1.8
Turnout		58,007	86.5	−0.5
Conservative hold		Swing	+0.7	

General election 1955: Bury and Radcliffe
Party	Candidate	Votes	%	±%
Conservative	John Bidgood	28,080	53.6	+2.0
Labour	Thomas Brennan	24,331	46.4	−2.0
Majority		3,749	7.2	+4.0
Turnout		52,411	80.2	−6.3
Conservative hold		Swing	+2.0	

General election 1959: Bury and Radcliffe
Party	Candidate	Votes	%	±%
Conservative	John Bidgood	28,623	53.7	+0.1
Labour	Robert Patrick Walsh	24,715	46.3	−0.1
Majority		3,908	7.4	+0.2
Turnout		53,338	82.2	+2.0
Conservative hold		Swing	+0.1	

=== Elections in the 1960s ===
General election 1964: Bury and Radcliffe
Party	Candidate	Votes	%	±%
Labour	David Ensor	23,865	44.1	−2.2
Conservative	John Bidgood	22,639	41.9	−11.8
Liberal	Charles L. Scholes	7,589	14.0	New
Majority		1,226	2.2	N/A
Turnout		54,093	82.3	+0.1
Labour gain from Conservative		Swing	+4.8	

General election 1966: Bury and Radcliffe
Party	Candidate	Votes	%	±%
Labour	David Ensor	26,769	49.8	+5.7
Conservative	John Bidgood	22,298	41.5	−0.4
Liberal	Charles L. Scholes	4,694	8.7	−5.3
Majority		4,471	8.3	+6.1
Turnout		53,761	81.3	−1.0
Labour hold		Swing	+3.1	

=== Elections in the 1970s ===
General election 1970: Bury and Radcliffe
Party	Candidate	Votes	%	±%
Conservative	Michael Fidler	29,796	52.8	+11.3
Labour	Dennis V. Hunt	26,592	47.2	−2.6
Majority		3,204	5.6	N/A
Turnout		56,388	75.6	−5.7
Conservative gain from Labour		Swing	+7.0	

General election February 1974: Bury and Radcliffe
Party	Candidate	Votes	%	±%
Conservative	Michael Fidler	31,113	50.3	−2.5
Labour	Frank White	30,768	49.7	+2.5
Majority		345	0.6	−5.0
Turnout		61,881	80.2	+4.6
Conservative hold		Swing	−2.5	

General election October 1974: Bury and Radcliffe
Party	Candidate	Votes	%	±%
Labour	Frank White	26,430	42.0	−7.7
Conservative	Michael Fidler	25,988	41.3	−9.0
Liberal	A. Benson	10,463	16.6	New
Majority		442	0.7	N/A
Turnout		62,891	80.8	+0.6
Labour gain from Conservative		Swing	+0.7	

General election 1979: Bury and Radcliffe
Party	Candidate	Votes	%	±%
Labour	Frank White	29,194	45.3	+3.3
Conservative	Peter J. Le Bosquet	29,156	45.2	+3.9
Liberal	S. Vickers	5,711	8.9	−7.7
National Front	J.M. Bridge	414	0.6	New
Majority		38	0.1	−0.6
Turnout		64,475	82.6	+1.8
Labour hold		Swing	−0.3	
