= Cameron Thomas (politician) =

British politician (born 1982)

Cameron Thomas MP
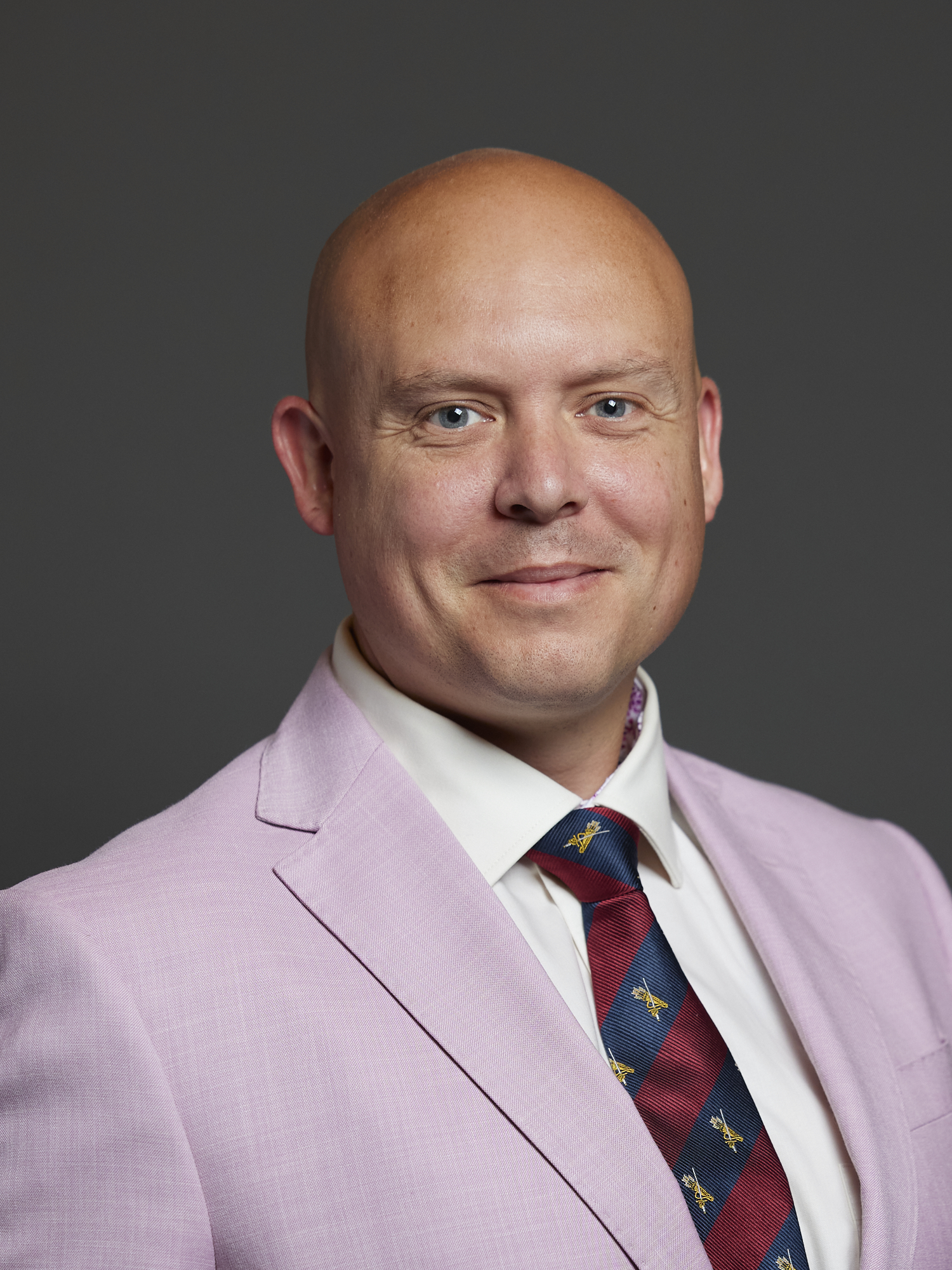
- Official portrait, 2024

Member of Parliament for Tewkesbury
- Incumbent
- Assumed office 4 July 2024
- Preceded by: Laurence Robertson
- Majority: 6,262 (12.9%)

Personal details
- Born: Aaron Cameron Thomas; December 1982 (age 43)
- Party: Independent (since 2026)
- Other party: Liberal Democrats (until 2026) (Note: Suspended since 17 June 2026.)
- Website: cameronthomas.co.uk

Military service
- Allegiance: United Kingdom
- Branch/service: Royal Air Force
- Years of service: 2000–2023
- Rank: Flight lieutenant
- Battles/wars: Iraq War

Aaron Cameron Thomas (born December 1982) is a British politician who has been the Member of Parliament for Tewkesbury since 2024. Elected as a Liberal Democrat, he is currently suspended from the party pending a police investigation.

== Early life ==
Thomas was born in December 1982. He joined the Royal Air Force at the age of 17, initially within the ranks and later served as a commissioned officer. He served several operational tours which included Iraq, the United Arab Emirates and a non operational tour of the Falkland Islands. Thomas also served heavily in the training environment, including a tour as a drill instructor, training 1000 recruits over 3 years, before resigning his commission, as a flight lieutenant, to enter politics.

In August 2021, Thomas's team helped to plan the British withdrawal from Afghanistan. Later that year, Thomas was deployed to East Midlands NHS, where he planned and delivered the rollout of COVID-19 vaccines across Leicestershire and Rutland.

== Political career ==
In the 2024 general election, Thomas stood as the Liberal Democrat candidate for Tewkesbury against the Conservative incumbent Laurence Robertson. He was successfully elected with a majority of 6,262 on a swing of 24.5% from the Conservatives to the Liberal Democrats. Thomas's election marked the first time since 1885 that Tewkesbury has had a non-Conservative MP.

Thomas made his maiden speech in Parliament on 18 July 2024 in the King’s Speech debate. He was the first of the 57 newly elected Liberal Democrat MPs to make a maiden speech. In his maiden speech, Thomas spoke about his experience serving in the Royal Air Force, his family history of military service and his priorities as a member of parliament, including defence, the climate emergency and proportional representation.

Thomas serves on the House of Commons' Committee for Culture, Media and Sport which is responsible for scrutinising the Department for Culture, Media and Sport, including bodies like the BBC. Thomas served as a member of the Environmental Audit Committee which considers the extent to which the policies and programmes of government departments and non-departmental public bodies contribute to environmental protection and sustainable development.

In March 2025, Thomas travelled to Ukraine to deliver aid to areas near the front line. Speaking to BBC Radio Gloucestershire following the trip, Thomas paid tribute to the "resilience and resolve of the Ukrainian people, and their adoration for the British and the support we've been giving them." Thomas’ participation in the aid convoy led to him being sanctioned by Russia for “fabricating anti-Russian narratives”. Two months after the trip, Thomas was accused of sending intimate WhatsApp messages to a Ukrainian translator while on the trip, with the woman claiming to feel uncomfortable regarding the nature of the messages; he denied any wrongdoing.

=== Legal issues ===
On 17 June 2026, Thomas was arrested by officers from Gloucestershire Constabulary on suspicion of controlling and coercive behaviour and assault, and was later released on bail. The following day, the Liberal Democrats stated that his party membership had been suspended while the police inquiry was ongoing.

== Electoral history ==
General election 2024: Tewkesbury
Party	Candidate	Votes	%	±%
Liberal Democrats	Cameron Thomas	20,730	42.7	▲20.7
Conservative	Laurence Robertson	14,468	29.8	▼28.3
Reform	Byron Davis	6,000	12.4	▲12.4
Labour	Damola Animashaun	4,298	8.9	▼6.8
Green	Cate Cody	2,873	5.9	▲1.7
CPA	David Edgar	170	0.4	▲0.4
Majority		6,262	12.9	▲20.7
Turnout		48,539	66.1	▼8.3
Registered electors		73,458		▼12.5
Liberal Democrats gain from Conservative		Swing	▲24.5	

Parliament of the United Kingdom
Preceded by Laurence Robertson	Member of Parliament for Tewkesbury; 2024–present	Incumbent
