= John Bidgood =

British politician

John Claude Bidgood (12 May 1914 – 17 August 2001) was a British Conservative Party politician.

He was elected at the 1955 general election as Member of Parliament (MP) for Bury and Radcliffe. Bidgood was re-elected at the 1959 election, but at the 1964 general election he lost his seat to Labour's David Ensor.

Parliament of the United Kingdom
Preceded by Sir Walter Fletcher	Member of Parliament for Bury and Radcliffe; 1955–1964	Succeeded by David Ensor
