= 1983 Bolton Metropolitan Borough Council election =

1983 UK local government election

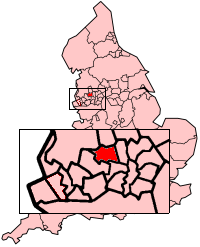
The Metropolitan Borough of Bolton shown within England

The 1983 Bolton Metropolitan Borough Council election took place on 5 May 1983 to elect members of Bolton Metropolitan Borough Council in Greater Manchester, England. One third of the council was up for election and the Labour Party kept overall control of the council.

Twenty seats were contested in the election: 13 were won by the Labour Party and 7 by the Conservative Party. After the election, the composition of the council was:

- Labour 36
- Conservative 22
- Liberal Party 2

== Election result ==
Bolton local election result 1983
Party	Seats	Gains	Losses	Net gain/loss	Seats %	Votes %	Votes	+/−
Labour	13	1	1	0		43.5	37.311	+6.0
Conservative	7	1	0	+1		38.0	32,574	-0.0
Liberal	0	0	1	-1		18.5	15,914	-6.0

== Council Composition ==
Prior to the election the composition of the council was:

↓
36	21	3
Labour	Conservative	L

After the election the composition of the council was:

↓
36	22	2
Labour	Conservative	L

L – Liberal

== Ward results ==
=== Astley Bridge ward ===
Astley Bridge ward
Party	Candidate	Votes	%	±%
Conservative	J Walsh	2,596	59.1	+1.2
Labour	J Haslam	1,231	28.0	+8.7
SDP	D Poole	567	12.9	−9.9
Majority		1,365	31.0	−2.2
Turnout		4,394	44.5	+7.8
Conservative hold		Swing	SDP to Labour 9.3	

=== Blackrod ward ===
Blackrod ward
Party	Candidate	Votes	%	±%
Labour	K Helsby	2,283	52.5	+4.9
Conservative	N Troup	1,592	36.6	+4.4
SDP	R Langley	476	10.9	−9.3
Majority		621	14.3	−1.1
Turnout		4,351	46.2	+6.7
Labour hold		Swing	SDP to Labour 7.1	

=== Bradshaw ward ===
Bradshaw ward
Party	Candidate	Votes	%	±%
Conservative	E Crook	2,546	57.9	+2.3
Labour	D McEneaney	1,051	23.9	+5.3
Liberal	W Steele	804	18.3	−7.4
Majority		1,495	34.0	+4.1
Turnout		4,401	40.7	+4.9
Conservative hold		Swing	Liberal to Labour 6.3	

=== Breightmet ward ===
Breightmet ward
Party	Candidate	Votes	%	±%
Labour	D Grime	2,163	49.2	+6.4
Conservative	I Chesney	1,590	36.2	−0.7
SDP	D Lee	639	14.5	−5.7
Majority		573	13.0	+7.1
Turnout		4,392	39.1	+2.7
Labour hold		Swing	SDP to Labour 6.0	

=== Bromley Cross ward ===
Bromley Cross ward
Party	Candidate	Votes	%	±%
Conservative	A Wilkinson	2,585	54.9	+7.0
SDP	J Hampson	1,209	25.7	−7.7
Labour	F Hampson	916	19.4	+0.7
Majority		1,376	29.2	+14.6
Turnout		4,710	46.6	+7.4
Conservative hold		Swing	SDP to Con 7.3	

=== Burnden ward ===
Burnden ward
Party	Candidate	Votes	%	±%
Labour	P Birch	2,139	47.2	+3.2
Conservative	W Hall	1,859	41.0	−2.9
Liberal	F Harasiwka	534	11.8	−0.3
Majority		280	6.2	+6.1
Turnout		4,532	48.0	+11.3
Labour hold		Swing	Con to Labour 3.0	

=== Central ward ===
Central ward
Party	Candidate	Votes	%	±%
Labour	D Dingwall	2,540	69.3	+1.3
Conservative	S Haslam	632	17.2	+2.0
Liberal	J Hayes	493	13.5	−3.3
Majority		1,908	52.1	+0.9
Turnout		3,665	43.6	+6.9
Labour hold		Swing	Liberal to Con 2.6	

=== Daubhill ward ===
Daubhill ward
Party	Candidate	Votes	%	±%
Labour	M Donaghy	2,768	60.5	+8.2
Conservative	G Ellis	1,515	33.1	−2.6
SDP	P Keveaney	289	6.3	−5.8
Independent	I Hamilton	65	1.4	
Majority		1,253	27.4	+8.3
Turnout		4,572	49.5	+8.4
Labour hold		Swing	SDP to Labour 7.0	

=== Deane-cum-Heaton ward ===
Deane-cum-Heaton ward
Party	Candidate	Votes	%	±%
Conservative	J Hanscomb	3,317	57.1	−5.3
SDP	T Hamilton	1,397	24.0	+3.5
Labour	E Walker	1,096	18.9	+1.8
Majority		1,920	33.0	−8.8
Turnout		5,810	45.7	+5.1
Conservative hold		Swing	Con to SDP 4.4	

=== Derby ward ===
Derby ward
Party	Candidate	Votes	%	±%
Labour	K Peters	3,232	77.9	+7.0
Conservative	L Robertson	568	13.7	+0.0
SDP	D Newman	269	6.5	−6.7
Communist	A Johnson	79	1.9	−0.3
Majority		2,664	64.2	+6.7
Turnout		4,148	40.3	+5.3
Labour hold		Swing	SDP to Labour 6.8	

=== Farnworth ward ===
Farnworth ward
Party	Candidate	Votes	%	±%
Labour	W Hardman	2,077	64.1	+4.0
Conservative	A Royse	750	23.1	+3.3
Liberal	L Bale	414	12.8	−7.4
Majority		1,327	40.9	+16.9
Turnout		3,241	32.6	+8.6
Labour hold		Swing	Liberal to Labour 5.7	

=== Halliwell ward ===
Halliwell ward
Party	Candidate	Votes	%	±%
Labour	C Morris	1,966	43.8	+6.9
Liberal	A Halliwell	1,503	33.5	−3.7
Conservative	W Hall	1,018	22.7	−3.2
Majority		463	10.3	
Turnout		4,487	45.4	+11.6
Labour gain from Liberal		Swing	Liberal to Labour 5.3	

=== Harper Green ward ===
Harper Green ward
Party	Candidate	Votes	%	±%
Labour	M Atkinson	2,388	60.7	+4.7
Conservative	J Cosgrove	969	24.6	+24.6
Liberal	L Sanderson	533	13.7	−27.0
Communist	T McKnight	42	1.1	−2.2
Majority		1,419	36.1	+20.7
Turnout		3,932	37.0	+9.6
Labour hold		Swing	Liberal to Con 25.8	

=== Horwich ward ===
Horwich ward
Party	Candidate	Votes	%	±%
Labour	E McCracken	2,259	42.9	+2.7
Conservative	S Dawson	1,966	37.3	+0.0
SDP	D Morris	1,041	19.8	−2.6
Majority		293	5.6	+2.7
Turnout		5,266	48.5	+6.9
Labour hold		Swing	SDP to Labour 2.6	

=== Hulton Park ward ===
Hulton Park ward
Party	Candidate	Votes	%	±%
Conservative	G Smith	2,123	51.7	−0.4
Labour	A Forrest	1,320	32.2	+8.7
Liberal	H Wise	660	16.1	−8.3
Majority		803	19.6	−8.2
Turnout		4,103	41.0	+6.6
Conservative hold		Swing	Liberal to Labour 8.5	

=== Kearsley ward ===
Kearsley ward
Party	Candidate	Votes	%	±%
Labour	W Robinson	2,095	49.2	+9.7
Liberal	E Bell	1,468	34.5	−10.4
Conservative	A Waterson	695	16.3	+0.7
Majority		627	14.7	
Turnout		4,258	44.0	+6.2
Labour hold		Swing	Liberal to Labour 10.0	

=== Little Lever ward ===
Little Lever ward
Party	Candidate	Votes	%	±%
Conservative	D Dziubas	1,955	47.4	−3.3
Labour	J Marsh	1,648	39.9	+14.3
SDP	K Banks	523	12.7	−11.0
Majority		307	7.4	−17.7
Turnout		4,126	45.6	+3.5
Conservative gain from Labour		Swing	SDP to Labour 12.6	

=== Smithills ward ===
Smithills ward
Party	Candidate	Votes	%	±%
Conservative	M Howarth	1,950	45.1	−9.8
Liberal	R Hayes	1,688	39.1	+10.6
Labour	N Wilde	683	15.8	−0.8
Majority		262	6.1	−20.4
Turnout		4,321	48.3	−8.4
Conservative hold		Swing	Con to Liberal 10.2	

=== Tonge ward ===
Tonge ward
Party	Candidate	Votes	%	±%
Labour	D Clare	1,953	47.3	+11.5
Conservative	G Kearton	1,804	43.7	−3.1
SDP	E West	371	9.0	−8.4
Majority		149	3.6	
Turnout		4,128	44.5	+7.3
Labour hold		Swing	SDP to Labour 9.9	

=== Westhoughton ward ===
Westhoughton ward
Party	Candidate	Votes	%	±%
Labour	P Finch	1,503	48.8	+9.4
Liberal	D Wilkinson	1,036	33.6	−5.7
Conservative	G Martin	544	17.6	−3.7
Majority		467	15.1	+14.3
Turnout		3,083	48.3	+8.0
Labour hold		Swing	Liberal to Labour 7.5	
