= Walter Fletcher (politician) =

British Member of Parliament and businessman (1892-1956)

Sir Walter Fletcher CBE MP
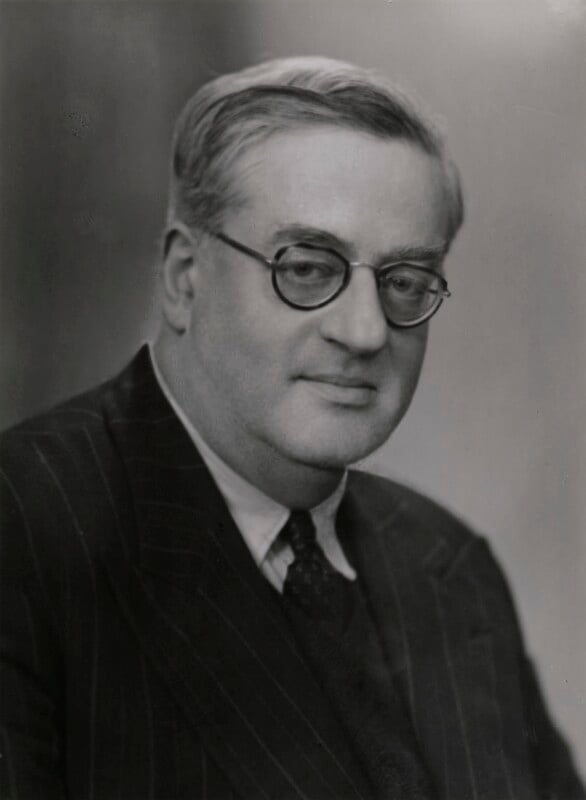
- Fletcher in 1950

Member of Parliament for Bury
- In office 6 July 1945 – 23 February 1950
- Majority: 110

Member of Parliament for Bury and Radcliffe
- In office 24 February 1950 – 26 May 1955
- Majority: 1,891

Personal details
- Born: Walter Fleischl von Marxow; 8 April 1892 Shagbrooke, Reigate, Surrey, England
- Died: 6 April 1956 (aged 63) London, England
- Resting place: Sacombe, near Ware, Hertfordshire
- Party: Conservative
- Spouse: Esme Boyd (married 1928)
- Parents: Paul Fleischl von Marxow (father); Cecile Fleischl von Marxow (née Levis) (mother)
- Relatives: Ernst von Fleischl-Marxow (uncle)
- Education: Charterhouse School; University of Lausanne
- Occupation: Businessman; politician; military officer; secret agent; smuggler; fine art artist

Military service
- Allegiance: United Kingdom, Allied Forces
- Branch/service: British Army, Special Operations Executive
- Years of service: 1914–1918; 1940–1945
- Rank: Major
- Unit: Royal Army Ordnance Corps (WWI); Force 136 (WWII)
- Battles/wars: World War I: East African campaign; World War II: Operation Remorse; Japanese invasion of Malaya; French Indo-China Campaign
- Awards: Commander of the Order of the British Empire

Sir Walter Fletcher CBE MP (8 April 1892 – 6 April 1956) was a British businessman, World War I veteran, Special Operations Executive's secret agent and smuggler, fine art artist and Conservative Party politician.

== Life and military career ==
=== Early life ===
Born Walter Fleischl von Marxow, he was the second son of Paul Fleischl von Marxow and his wife Cecile (née Levis) of Shagbrooke, Reigate, Surrey. His father was an Austrian-born woolbroker, brother of Ernst von Fleischl-Marxow, who became a naturalised British citizen in 1887.

Following education at Charterhouse School and the University of Lausanne, he began training as a manager in the rubber industry.

=== World War I ===
With the outbreak of World War I in 1914 he entered the British Army, obtaining a commission in the Army Ordnance Department. He served in East Africa, and by the end of the war in 1918 had reached the rank of major.

=== Post-WWI ===
In September 1919 he changed his name by deed poll to Walter Fletcher. He returned to Africa, where he managed a large number of rubber plantations. He returned to England, where he subsequently became chairman and managing director of Hecht, Levis and Kahn, a major rubber and commodities company. He held the position for thirty years. In 1928 he married Esme Boyd.

=== World War II ===
In late 1940, Fletcher approached Special Operations Executive and offered them his expertise. He was eventually assigned to Force 136 and ran an operation called Operation Remorse. Originally it was hoped Fletcher could use his contacts to smuggle rubber out of Japanese-occupied Malaya and Indo-China through the Chinese black market. The operation was diversified to include the smuggling of foreign currency, diamonds and machinery to fund SOE's activities.

Colin Mackenzie, the head of Force 136 (SOE in the Far East), said of Fletcher, “He did it very well… even in the early days I had £20,000 of diamonds across my desk in one go. One estimate is that the net profit was worth £77 million.” Mackenzie also commented:

Walter was gloriously fat. It was rumoured that he won the hundred yards at Charterhouse when he was nineteen stone. I didn’t believe it, but when I saw him running for a bus when he was still nineteen stone I began to believe it might be true.

In 1947 Fletcher was made Commander of the Order of the British Empire for his war service.

== Political career ==
Politically, Fletcher was a Conservative, and he was selected as the party's prospective parliamentary candidate for the Birkenhead East seat in 1930. However, with the formation of a National Government prior to the 1931 general election he stood aside to allow Henry Graham White, a Liberal member of the government to hold the seat.

He was elected at the 1945 general election as Member of Parliament (MP) for Bury in Lancashire. When that constituency was abolished for the 1950 election, he was returned for the new Bury and Radcliffe constituency, and held the seat until he retired from the House of Commons at the 1955 general election. In 1953 he was knighted.

== Other works ==
In addition to his business and political interests, Fletcher had extensive farms in Hertfordshire. He was also an accomplished painter, exhibiting at the Royal Academy and in Bond Street galleries.

== Death ==
Fletcher died at his London home in April 1956 aged 63. He was buried in Sacombe, near Ware, Hertfordshire.

== Honours ==
- UK: Mentioned in dispatches (World War I)
- UK: Officer of the Most Excellent Order of the British Empire (OBE) (World War I)
- UK: Commander of the Most Excellent Order of the British Empire (CBE) (1947)
- UK: Knight Bachelor (1953)

Parliament of the United Kingdom
Preceded by Alan Chorlton	Member of Parliament for Bury; 1945–1950	Constituency abolished
New constituency	Member of Parliament for Bury and Radcliffe; 1950–1955	Succeeded by John Bidgood
