= 2003 Bolton Metropolitan Borough Council election =

UK local election

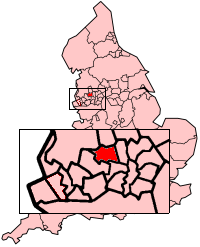
The Metropolitan Borough of Bolton shown within England.

Elections to Bolton Metropolitan Borough Council were held on 1 May 2003. One third of the council was up for election and the Labour party lost overall control of the council to no overall control, for the first time since 1980. The Labour party continued to run the council in a minority administration.

20 seats were contested in the election, with 7 being won by the Labour Party, 7 by the Conservatives and 6 by the Liberal Democrats.

After the election, the composition of the council was

- Labour 27
- Conservative 19
- Liberal Democrat 14

== Election result ==
Bolton local election result 2003
Party	Seats	Gains	Losses	Net gain/loss	Seats %	Votes %	Votes	+/−
Labour	7	0	4	-4	35.0	35.1	27,668	-5.2%
Conservative	7	3	0	+3	35.0	34.1	26,833	+0.4%
Liberal Democrats	6	2	1	+1	30.0	29.0	22,878	+5.8%
Socialist Labour	0	0	0	0	0	0.8	627	-0.4%
Socialist Alliance	0	0	0	0	0	0.7	563	+0.1%
Green	0	0	0	0	0	0.3	218	+0.0%

== Council Composition ==
Prior to the election the composition of the council was:

↓
31	16	13
Labour	Conservative	Lib Dems

After the election the composition of the council was:

↓
27	19	14
Labour	Conservative	Lib Dems

== Ward results ==
=== Astley Bridge ward ===
Astley Bridge ward
Party	Candidate	Votes	%	±%
Conservative	Stuart Lever	2,285	50.0	−3.7
Labour	Christopher White	1,402	30.7	−4.0
Liberal Democrats	Ian Greenalgh	882	19.3	+7.7
Majority		883	19.3	+0.3
Turnout		4,569	41.0	+6.0
Conservative hold		Swing	Labour to LD 5.8	

=== Blackrod ward ===
Blackrod ward
Party	Candidate	Votes	%	±%
Liberal Democrats	Martyn Cox	1,456	36.8	+11.2
Labour	Kevan Helsby	1,362	34.4	−3.7
Conservative	Michael Hollick	1,138	28.8	−7.5
Majority		94	2.4	
Turnout		3,956	42.0	+11.0
Liberal Democrats gain from Labour		Swing	Con to LD 9.3	

=== Bradshaw ward ===
Bradshaw ward
Party	Candidate	Votes	%	±%
Conservative	Walter Hall	2,600	53.7	−1.8
Labour	Eric Hyland	1,302	26.9	−2.2
Liberal Democrats	Stephen Howarth	944	19.5	+4.1
Majority		1,298	26.8	+0.4
Turnout		4,846	44.0	+9.0
Conservative hold		Swing	Labour to LD 3.1	

=== Breightmet ward ===
Breightmet ward
Party	Candidate	Votes	%	±%
Labour	Donald Grime	1,426	41.2	−5.3
Conservative	Richard Elliott	1,370	39.6	−1.5
Liberal Democrats	Edward Hill	666	19.2	+6.8
Majority		56	1.6	−3.8
Turnout		3,462	38.0	+10.0
Labour hold		Swing	Labour to LD 6.0	

=== Bromley Cross ward ===
Bromley Cross ward
Party	Candidate	Votes	%	±%
Conservative	Alan Wilkinson	3,065	61.3	+1.6
Labour	Anthony Muscat Terribile	1,048	20.9	−5.3
Liberal Democrats	Stewart Ball	890	17.8	+3.7
Majority		2,017	40.4	+6.9
Turnout		5,003	46.0	+10.0
Conservative hold		Swing	Labour to LD 4.5	

=== Burnden ward ===
Burnden ward
Party	Candidate	Votes	%	±%
Conservative	Mohammad Idrees	1,453	39.5	
Labour	Martin McMulkin	1,421	38.6	
Liberal Democrats	David Connor	686	18.6	
Socialist Alliance	David Sumner	119	3.2	
Majority		32	0.9	
Turnout		3,679	38.0	+0.0
Conservative gain from Labour				

=== Central ward ===
Central ward
Party	Candidate	Votes	%	±%
Liberal Democrats	Valibhai Patel	1,693	49.8	+40.1
Labour	John Noble	1,191	35.0	−9.2
Conservative	Mohammed Iqbal	319	9.4	−12.0
Socialist Labour	Lynne Lowe	198	5.8	+2.0
Majority		502	14.8	
Turnout		3,401	47.0	+13.0
Liberal Democrats gain from Labour		Swing	Con to LD 26.0	

=== Daubhill ward ===
Daubhill ward
Party	Candidate	Votes	%	±%
Labour	Thomas Fitzpatrick	1,335	41.7	−14.0
Liberal Democrats	Linden Greensitt	1,091	34.0	+17.0
Conservative	John Heyes	779	24.3	−3.1
Majority		244	7.7	−20.6
Turnout		3,205	40.0	+12.0
Labour hold		Swing	Labour to LD 15.5	

=== Deane-cum-Heaton ward ===
Deane-cum-Heaton ward
Party	Candidate	Votes	%	±%
Conservative	John Hanscomb	3,285	54.8	−0.6
Labour	John Gillatt	1,598	26.6	+1.1
Liberal Democrats	Christine Macpherson	1,116	18.6	−0.6
Majority		1,687	28.2	−1.7
Turnout		5,999	45.0	+11.0
Conservative hold		Swing	Con to Labour 0.8	

=== Derby ward ===
Derby ward
Party	Candidate	Votes	%	±%
Labour	Rosa Kay	1,868	49.7	−27.0
Conservative	Yakub Jiva	1,101	29.3	+17.8
Liberal Democrats	Sara McGeehan	500	13.3	+6.4
Socialist Alliance	Neil McAlister	202	5.4	+5.4
Socialist Labour	Dorothy Entwistle	84	2.2	−2.7
Majority		767	20.4	−44.8
Turnout		3,755	44.0	+10.0
Labour hold		Swing	Labour to Con 22.4	

=== Farnworth ward ===
Farnworth ward
Party	Candidate	Votes	%	±%
Labour	Raymond Stones	1,627	59.1	+0.1
Conservative	Stanley Jackson	556	20.2	+2.4
Liberal Democrats	Stephen Rock	402	14.6	−1.8
Socialist Labour	William Kelly	167	6.1	−0.8
Majority		1,071	38.9	−2.3
Turnout		2,752	34.0	+14.0
Labour hold		Swing	LD to Con 2.1	

=== Halliwell ward ===
Halliwell ward
Party	Candidate	Votes	%	±%
Labour	Cliff Morris	1,848	53.2	+0.4
Conservative	James Hinegan	732	21.1	−1.7
Liberal Democrats	Anne Warren	683	19.7	+3.6
Socialist Alliance	John Greenwood	151	4.3	+4.3
Socialist Labour	Howard Broadbent	61	1.8	−3.5
Majority		1,116	32.1	+2.1
Turnout		3,475	41.0	+9.0
Labour hold		Swing	Con to LD 2.6	

=== Harper Green ward ===
Harper Green ward
Party	Candidate	Votes	%	±%
Labour	George Dennis	1,673	50.8	−6.5
Conservative	Robert Tyler	807	24.5	+2.1
Liberal Democrats	Wendy Connor	699	21.2	+6.3
Socialist Labour	William Kelly	117	3.5	−1.9
Majority		866	26.3	−8.6
Turnout		3,296	37.0	+16.0
Labour hold		Swing	Labour to LD 6.4	

=== Horwich ward ===
Horwich ward
Party	Candidate	Votes	%	±%
Liberal Democrats	John Cronnolley	2,284	51.8	−3.7
Labour	Joyce Kellet	1,170	26.5	+0.3
Conservative	Olive Fairhurst	864	19.6	+3.0
Socialist Alliance	Robert Ince	91	2.1	+0.0
Majority		1,114	25.3	−3.7
Turnout		4,409	45.0	+9.0
Liberal Democrats hold		Swing	LD to Con 3.4	

=== Hulton Park ward ===
Hulton Park ward
Party	Candidate	Votes	%	±%
Conservative	Phillip Ashcroft	2,064	38.5	+2.1
Liberal Democrats	Derek Gradwell	1,756	32.8	−1.5
Labour	David Chadwick	1,540	28.7	−0.5
Majority		308	5.7	+3.6
Turnout		5,360	40.0	+12.0
Conservative gain from Liberal Democrats		Swing	LD to Con 1.8	

=== Kearsley ward ===
Kearsley ward
Party	Candidate	Votes	%	±%
Liberal Democrats	John Rothwell	1,863	51.9	+3.5
Labour	Derek Burrows	1,348	37.5	−4.7
Conservative	Sheila Kesler	381	10.6	+1.2
Majority		515	14.4	+8.2
Turnout		3,592	41.0	+14.0
Liberal Democrats hold		Swing	Labour to LD 4.1	

=== Little Lever ward ===
Little Lever ward
Party	Candidate	Votes	%	±%
Conservative	Mary Woodward	1,658	40.4	+3.6
Labour	Robert Evans	1,554	37.9	−11.5
Liberal Democrats	William Crook	669	16.3	+5.1
Green	Alwynne Cartmell	218	5.3	+5.3
Majority		104	2.5	
Turnout		4,099	49.0	+15.0
Conservative gain from Labour		Swing	Labour to Green 8.4	

=== Smithills ward ===
Smithills ward
Party	Candidate	Votes	%	±%
Liberal Democrats	Joe Higson	2,398	64.1	+5.1
Conservative	Douglas Bagnall	705	18.8	−0.6
Labour	Barbara Ramsden	640	17.1	−1.3
Majority		1,693	45.3	+5.7
Turnout		3,743	50.0	+14.0
Liberal Democrats hold		Swing	Labour to LD 3.3	

=== Tonge ward ===
Tonge ward
Party	Candidate	Votes	%	±%
Labour	Elaine Sherrington	1,510	49.7	−2.7
Conservative	Nigel Ford	1,092	35.9	+1.6
Liberal Democrats	Michael Langdon	438	14.4	+1.1
Majority		418	13.8	−4.3
Turnout		3,040	39.0	+7.0
Labour hold		Swing	Labour to Con 2.1	

=== Westhoughton ward ===
Westhoughton ward
Party	Candidate	Votes	%	±%
Liberal Democrats	David Wilkinson	1,762	56.0	+6.2
Labour	James Kilcoyne	805	25.6	−11.6
Conservative	Jane Frappola	579	18.4	+5.4
Majority		957	30.4	+17.8
Turnout		3,146	39.0	+11.0
Liberal Democrats hold		Swing	Labour to LD 8.9	

== Sources ==
=== References ===
- Rallings, Colin; Thrasher, Michael. "Bolton Metropolitan Borough Council Election Results 1973–2012" (PDF). The Elections Centre. The Elections Centre, Plymouth University.
