= Frank White (British politician) =

British politician (1939–2026)

Mayor of Bolton
- In office 2005–2006
- Preceded by: Prentice Howarth
- Succeeded by: Walter Hall

Member of Parliament for Bury and Radcliffe
- In office Oct 1974 – 1983
- Preceded by: Michael Fidler
- Succeeded by: Constituency abolished

Personal details
- Born: Frank Richard White; 11 November 1939
- Died: November 2026 (aged 87)
- Party: Labour
- Spouse: Eileen Crook

Frank Richard White (11 November 1939 – November 2026) was a British politician. A member of the Labour Party, he served as the Member of Parliament for Bury and Radcliffe from October 1974 to 1983, when his seat was abolished by boundary changes for the 1983 general election. He served as a councillor for the Metropolitan Borough of Bolton from 1986 to 2005, and later as the Mayor of Bolton from 2005 to 2006.

== Personal life and death ==
Frank White was born on 11 November 1939. He was the son of Edna Mead, and Arthur Leslie White, a sapper with the Royal Engineers who died in 1943 as a Japanese Prisoner of War while working on the Burma-Siam Railway. Following his education at Folds Road School in Bolton and Bolton Technical School, Frank worked in a mail order distribution firm, becoming an official in the General and Municipal Workers Union.

In 1967, he married Eileen Crook at St Augustine's Church in Bolton, with whom he had three children. White was an occasional amateur boxer, footballer, part-time football referee, and a supporter of Bolton Wanderers.

White died in November 2026 at the age of 87.

== Career ==
His first elected political office was as a councillor to Bolton County Borough council, representing the Tonge ward from 1964 to 1974. On his second attempt, he was elected at the October 1974 general election as the Member of Parliament (MP) for the marginal Bury and Radcliffe constituency. He was an assistant government whip from 1976 to 1978. His Bury and Radcliffe seat was abolished by boundary changes for the 1983 general election. Instead he stood in the newly formed Bury North seat, but lost to the Conservative candidate Alistair Burt. In 1986, he was elected as a councillor to Bolton Metropolitan Borough council, once again representing the Tonge ward. After ward boundary and name changes in 2004, he represented the Tonge with The Haulgh ward. He attempted to re-enter Parliament in the 1987 general election for Bolton North East, but failed by 813 votes.

Between 2005 and 2006, he served as the Mayor of Bolton, with his wife, Eileen, as Mayoress. He was also the Chairman of Lancashire Co-operative Development Agency; a Magistrate, becoming Chairman of Bolton Magistrates Bench; and Chairman of East Bolton Regeneration Partnership.

Parliament of the United Kingdom
Preceded by Michael Fidler	Member of Parliament for Bury and Radcliffe; Oct 1974–1983	Constituency abolished
