= Alderman Knight School =

Location
- Ashchurch Road; Tewkesbury; Gloucestershire, GL20 8JJ; England
- Coordinates: 51.9963°N 2.1277°W

Information
- Type: Community special school
- Local authority: Gloucestershire
- Department for Education URN: 115825 Tables
- Ofsted: Reports
- Head Teacher: Tim Blakey
- Gender: Mixed
- Age: 7 to 19
- Enrolment: 242
- Website: http://www.aldermanknight.gloucs.sch.uk/

Alderman Knight School is a mixed special school located in Tewkesbury in the English county of Gloucestershire.The school is named after Frank Knight, a former Mayor of Tewkesbury.

It is a community school administered by Gloucestershire County Council, and accepts pupils aged four to sixteen from mainly the Tewkesbury and North Cotswolds area but from other areas as the need arises.

Admissions to the school are for pupils with moderate learning difficulties, complex needs and autistic spectrum disorders.

Despite plans from the county council to close the school between 2004 and 2006, the school remained open and has received three ratings of "Outstanding" from Ofsted.
