= Barbara Ronson =

British politician (1942–2018)

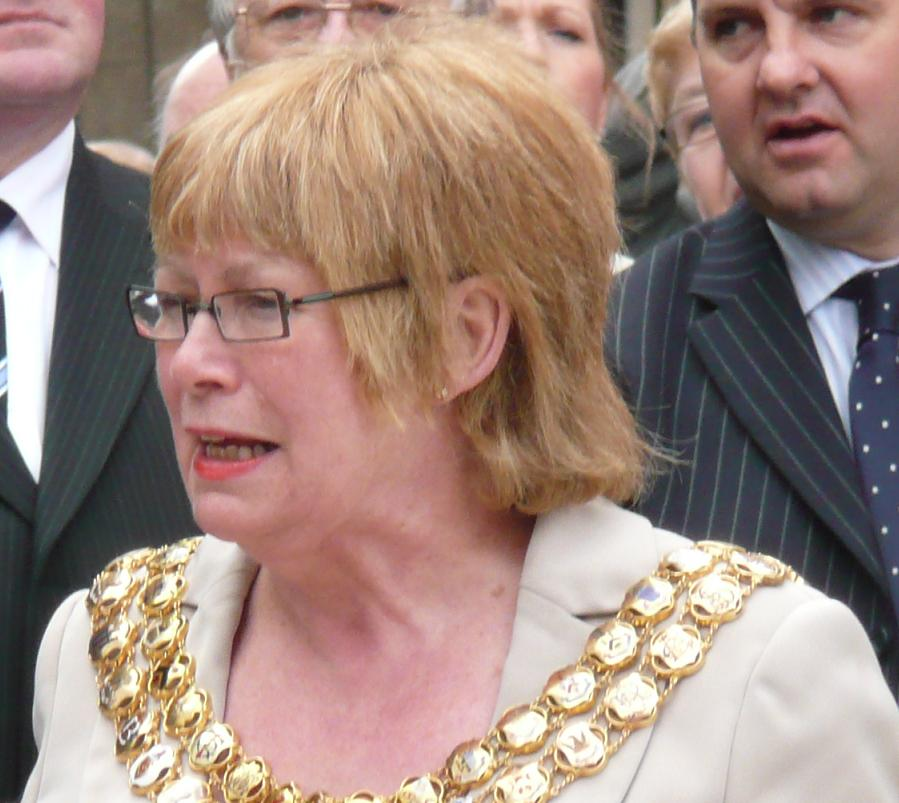
- Cllr. Barbara Ronson as Mayor of Bolton in 2008.

Mayor of Bolton
- In office 2007–2008
- Preceded by: Walter Hall
- Succeeded by: Anthony Connell

Leader of Bolton Council
- In office 2004–2006
- Preceded by: Robert Howarth
- Succeeded by: Clifford Morris

Mayor of Horwich
- In office 1996–1997
- Preceded by: John Bragg
- Succeeded by: Kevan James Helsby

Personal details
- Born: Barbara Olwyn Gettins; 16 December 1942 Bolton, England
- Died: 28 October 2018 (aged 75) Royal Bolton Hospital, England
- Party: Liberal Democrat
- Spouse: Robert Ronson
- Children: 2

Barbara Olwyn Ronson (16 December 1942 – 28 October 2018) was a Liberal Democrat politician from Horwich in the Metropolitan Borough of Bolton in Greater Manchester, England.

== Early life ==
Born as Barbara Olwyn Gettins in Bolton, she was educated at Pikes Lane School, Bolton; Bolton School (Girls Division); Manchester College of Commerce (now Manchester Metropolitan University); and Bolton Institute of Higher Education (now the University of Bolton). In 1964, she married Robert Ronson at Saviour's Church in Bolton.

== Political career ==
Barbara Ronson was elected as a Councillor to Bolton Borough Council in 1986; at first representing the Horwich ward and then, through name and slight boundary changes in 2004, the Horwich North East ward. She was also elected as a Councillor to Horwich Town Council in 1987. Her husband, Robert Ronson, was also a town and Borough Councillor.

In the 1992, 1997 and 2001 General Elections, she was an unsuccessful candidate in the Bolton West Constituency. During her political career, she was Mayor of Horwich 1996–1997, Leader of Bolton Council 2004–2006, and Mayor of Bolton 2007–2008.

Both Barbara and Robert Ronson stood down as town and Borough Councillors in 2011.

== Death ==
Barbara Ronson died in hospital on 28 October 2018, aged 75 years. In the same year, her son Mike died on 13 June 2018, aged 51 years, and her husband Robert (Bob) died on 3 December 2018, aged 83 years.
