= 1980 Bolton Metropolitan Borough Council election =

1980 UK local government election

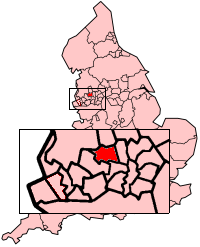
The Metropolitan Borough of Bolton shown within England.

Elections to Bolton Metropolitan Borough Council were held on 3 May 1980. The whole council was up for election, with boundary changes since the last election in 1979. The Labour Party gained control of the council from the Conservatives, who had previously been in control almost continuously since 1966. The overall number of councillors was reduced to 60 compared with 69 in 1979. The Labour Party made a net gain of 6 seats and the Conservatives a net loss of 15. Following this election, Cllr Robert Howarth of Central Ward was elected Leader of the council and was to remain Leader until 2004, one of the longest serving Council leaders in the UK.

== Election result ==
Bolton local election result 1980
Party	Seats	Gains	Losses	Net gain/loss	Seats %	Votes %	Votes	+/−
Labour	39			+6	65.0	48.9	41,394	+2.5
Conservative	20			-15	33.3	42.6	36,034	-4.1
Liberal	1			0	1.7	7.0	5,941	+0.2
Other parties	0			0	0	1.4	1,179	+1.4

== Ward results ==
=== Astley Bridge ward ===
Astley Bridge ward (3)
Party	Candidate	Votes	%	±%
Conservative	D Shepherd	2,745	23.5	
Conservative	A Hibbert	2,576	22.0	
Conservative	D Johnston	2,550	21.0	
Labour	W Wheeler	1,290	11.0	
Labour	P McFadden	1,206	10.3	
Labour	M Woodock	1,188	10.2	
National Front	K Bernal	133	1.1	
Turnout		11,688		

=== Blackrod ward ===
Blackrod ward (3)
Party	Candidate	Votes	%	±%
Labour	E Johnson	2,104	18.4	
Labour	J Clee	1,973	17.3	
Labour	J Monaghan	1,965	17.2	
Conservative	C Everin	1,963	17.2	
Conservative	G Jones	1,725	15.1	
Conservative	F Rushton	1,691	14.8	
Turnout		11,421		

=== Bradshaw ward ===
Bradshaw ward (3)
Party	Candidate	Votes	%	±%
Conservative	K Howarth	2,674	22.0	
Conservative	E Crook	2,603	21.5	
Conservative	B Furlong	2,558	21.1	
Labour	S Bryan	1,502	12.4	
Labour	G Platt	1,425	11.7	
Labour	P Howarth	1,369	11.3	
Turnout		12,131		

=== Breightmet ward ===
Breightmet ward (3)
Party	Candidate	Votes	%	±%
Labour	K McIvor	2,610	19.5	
Labour	D Grime	2,421	18.1	
Labour	C Benjamin	2,359	17.7	
Conservative	A Chadbond	2,156	16.1	
Conservative	R Greenhalgh	1,916	14.3	
Conservative	D Jones	1,898	14.2	
Turnout		13,360		

=== Bromley Cross ward ===
Bromley Cross ward (3)
Party	Candidate	Votes	%	±%
Conservative	A Poulson	2,512	20.2	
Conservative	T Mulligan	2,340	19.5	
Conservative	B Hurst	2,417	19.4	
Labour	D Doxsey	1,708	13.7	
Labour	N Peacock	1,701	13.7	
Labour	R Watson	1,681	13.5	
Turnout		12,449		

=== Burnden ward ===
Burnden ward (3)
Party	Candidate	Votes	%	±%
Labour	D Eastwood	2,524	18.9	
Labour	P Birch	2,368	17.8	
Labour	J Mason	2,362	17.7	
Conservative	M Drinkwater	2,063	15.5	
Conservative	L Hunton	1,953	14.7	
Conservative	R Haslam	1,927	14.5	
National Front	P Salveson	127	1.0	
Turnout		13,324		

=== Central ward ===
Central ward (3)
Party	Candidate	Votes	%	±%
Labour	R Howarth	2,657	26.0	
Labour	D Clark	2,652	25.9	
Labour	B Iddon	2,509	24.5	
Independent Labour	G Hart	934	9.1	
Conservative	J Bailey	738	7.2	
Conservative	J Goudie	731	7.2	
Turnout		10,221		

=== Daubhill ward ===
Daubhill ward (3)
Party	Candidate	Votes	%	±%
Labour	T Anderton	2,886	20.6	
Labour	M Donaghy	2,856	20.4	
Labour	G Harkin	2,722	19.4	
Conservative	R Carr	1,835	13.1	
Conservative	A Gledhill	1,801	12.8	
Conservative	J Walsh	1,683	12.0	
National Front	J Hamilton	238	1.7	
Turnout		14,021		

=== Deane cum Heaton ward ===
Deane cum Heaton ward (3)
Party	Candidate	Votes	%	±%
Conservative	D Berry	4,016	23.8	
Conservative	J Hanscomb	3,962	23.4	
Conservative	M Allanson	3,918	23.2	
Labour	C Morris	1,701	10.1	
Labour	J Jenkins	1,665	9.9	
Labour	J Walker	1,635	9.7	
Turnout		16,897		

=== Derby ward ===
Derby ward (3)
Party	Candidate	Votes	%	±%
Labour	J Foster	3,344	32.3	
Labour	K Peters	3,154	30.5	
Labour	G Riley	3,058	29.6	
Conservative	H Kolia	546	5.3	
Communist	A Johnson	245	2.4	
Turnout		10,347		

=== Farnworth ward ===
Farnworth ward (3)
Party	Candidate	Votes	%	±%
Labour	J Wild	2,207	25.6	
Labour	W Hardman	2,204	25.6	
Labour	P Johnston	2,065	24.0	
Conservative	A Waterson	618	7.2	
Conservative	B Coote	610	7.1	
Conservative	N Sever	570	6.6	
Liberal	L Bale	337	3.9	
Turnout		8,611		

=== Halliwell ward ===
Halliwell ward (3)
Party	Candidate	Votes	%	±%
Labour	E Hamer	2,011	16.9	
Liberal	J Fish	1,856	15.6	
Labour	R Johnson	1,775	14.9	
Labour	J Knight	1,768	14.8	
Liberal	S Roberts	1,227	10.3	
Liberal	E Wood	1,209	10.2	
Conservative	W Hall	1,052	8.8	
Conservative	W Higham	1,008	8.5	
Turnout		11,906		

=== Harper Green ward ===
Harper Green ward (3)
Party	Candidate	Votes	%	±%
Labour	D Butterfield	2,814	23.1	
Labour	M Atkinson	2,806	23.1	
Labour	L Williamson	2,646	21.8	
Conservative	A Royse	1,262	10.4	
Conservative	J Shore	1,100	9.0	
Conservative	E Holland	1,065	8.8	
Liberal	D Hinkley	471	3.9	
Turnout		12,164		

=== Horwich ward ===
Horwich ward (3)
Party	Candidate	Votes	%	±%
Labour	A Oakley	2,867	20.1	
Labour	V Broom	2,481	17.4	
Labour	P Senior	2,452	17.2	
Conservative	R Parkinson	2,202	15.5	
Conservative	S Dawson	2,193	15.4	
Conservative	P Willett	2,044	14.4	
Turnout		14,239		

=== Hulton Park ward ===
Hulton Park ward (3)
Party	Candidate	Votes	%	±%
Conservative	J Smith	2,307	21.5	
Conservative	G Smith	2,260	21.1	
Conservative	M Prince	2,193	20.5	
Labour	A Forrest	1,352	12.6	
Labour	P Start	1,305	12.2	
Labour	A Moon	1,293	12.1	
Turnout		10,710		

=== Kearsley ward ===
Kearsley ward (3)
Party	Candidate	Votes	%	±%
Labour	T Lewis	3,010	25.3	
Labour	W Robinson	2,548	21.4	
Labour	D Dingwall	2,423	20.4	
Liberal	J Rothwell	1,528	12.8	
Liberal	E Bell	1,200	10.1	
Conservative	J Tomlinson	1,194	10.0	
Turnout		11,903		

=== Little Lever ward ===
Little Lever ward (3)
Party	Candidate	Votes	%	±%
Conservative	K Hornby	2,057	17.3	
Labour	J Marsh	2,047	17.2	
Conservative	A Lawton	2,030	17.0	
Labour	L Sanderson	1,844	15.5	
Conservative	A Longmire	1,769	14.8	
Labour	E Walker	1,701	14.3	
Liberal	W Crook	469	3.9	
Turnout		11,917		

=== Smithills ward ===
Smithills ward (3)
Party	Candidate	Votes	%	±%
Conservative	S Collier	2,414	18.8	
Conservative	M Howarth	2,392	18.6	
Conservative	D Priestley	2,340	18.2	
Liberal	F Fish	1,085	8.5	
Labour	G Lever	1,011	7.9	
Labour	E McCracken	995	7.8	
Labour	T Palframan	987	7.7	
Liberal	A Oakes	815	6.3	
Liberal	D Walmsley	799	6.2	
Turnout		12,838		

=== Tonge ward ===
Tonge ward (3)
Party	Candidate	Votes	%	±%
Labour	A Brigg	2,212	17.7	
Labour	D Clare	2,155	17.3	
Labour	C Skull	2,095	16.8	
Conservative	S Harrison	2,032	16.3	
Conservative	K Knowles	2,007	16.1	
Conservative	J Rigby	1,991	15.9	
Turnout		12,492		

=== Westhoughton ward ===
Westhoughton ward (3)
Party	Candidate	Votes	%	±%
Labour	P Woodcock	1,607	25.5	
Labour	P Finch	1,511	23.9	
Labour	P Jones	1,402	22.2	
Liberal	D Wilkinson	969	15.4	
Conservative	T Riley	823	13.0	
Turnout		6,312		
