= 1973 Bolton Metropolitan Borough Council election =

1973 UK local government election

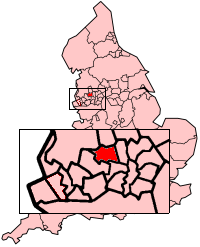
The Metropolitan Borough of Bolton shown within England.

The first elections to Bolton Metropolitan Borough Council were held on Thursday, 10 May 1973, with the entirety of the 69 seat council - three seats for each of the 23 wards - up for vote. It was the first council election as the newly formed metropolitan borough under a new constitution. The Local Government Act 1972 stipulated that the elected members were to shadow and eventually take over from the County Borough of Bolton, the Municipal Borough of Farnworth, the Urban Districts of Blackrod, Horwich, Kearsley, Little Lever, and Westhoughton, and the southern part of Turton Urban District on 1 April 1974. The order in which the councillors were elected dictated their term serving, with third-place candidates serving two years and up for re-election in 1975, second-placed three years expiring in 1976 and 1st-placed five years until 1978.

The Conservative Party took control of the new Council by a majority of 1. The Leader of the council was Councillor John Hanscomb, who held this position until Labour took control in 1980.

== Election result ==
Bolton local election result 1973
Party	Seats	Gains	Losses	Net gain/loss	Seats %	Votes %	Votes	+/−
Conservative	35					44.7	84,702	
Labour	31					44.2	83,729	
Liberal	2					8.9	16,916	
Other parties	1					2.1	3,940	

== Ward results ==
=== Astley Bridge ward ===
Astley Bridge ward (3)
Party	Candidate	Votes	%	±%
Conservative	D Shepherd	2,171	23.4	
Conservative	F Waterworth	2,087	22.5	
Conservative	A Hibbert	1,986	21.4	
Labour	J Walker	1,082	11.7	
Labour	N Lee	1,007	10.9	
Labour	D Jones	938	10.1	
Turnout		9,721	34.0	

=== Bradshaw North and South ward ===
Bradshaw North and South ward (3)
Party	Candidate	Votes	%	±%
Conservative	B Furlong	1,090	15.1	
Conservative	T Greenhalgh	1,077	15.0	
Conservative	K Howarth	1,073	14.9	
Liberal	A Winstanley	1,054	14.6	
Liberal	J Webster	1,037	14.4	
Liberal	M Batth	1,012	14.1	
Labour	A Brigg	300	4.2	
Labour	J Riley	285	4.0	
Labour	C Benjamin	270	3.8	
Turnout		7,198	40.5	

=== Bradford ward ===
Bradford ward (3)
Party	Candidate	Votes	%	±%
Labour	J Foster	1,119	27.1	
Labour	T McEwan	1,046	25.1	
Labour	C Skull	1,011	24.5	
Conservative	D Hall	329	8.0	
Conservative	C Gregory	325	7.9	
Conservative	D Harris	294	7.1	
Turnout		4,124	31.0	

=== Bromley Cross, Eagley and Egerton ward ===
Bromley Cross, Eagley and Egerton ward (3)
Party	Candidate	Votes	%	±%
Conservative	D Carr	1,456	15.5	
Conservative	A Poulson	1,421	15.1	
Conservative	H Bennett	1,412	15.0	
Liberal	P O'Connor	1,175	12.5	
Liberal	T Williams	1,124	12.0	
Liberal	D Charlton	1,095	11.7	
Labour	H Haslam	670	7.1	
Labour	S Chadwick	542	5.8	
Labour	A Uttley	489	5.2	
Turnout		9,384	41.3	

=== Church East and North ward ===
Church East and North ward (3)
Party	Candidate	Votes	%	±%
Conservative	R Halliwell	1,790	20.7	
Conservative	E Crook	1,711	19.8	
Conservative	A O'Neil	1,641	19.0	
Labour	M Johnson	1,290	14.9	
Labour	J Knight	1,140	13.2	
Labour	B Turner	1,081	12.5	
Turnout		8,653	41.0	

=== Darcy Lever cum Breightmet ward ===
Darcy Lever cum Breightmet ward (3)
Party	Candidate	Votes	%	±%
Labour	D Dingwall	2,064	18.6	
Labour	K McIvor	1,913	17.3	
Labour	P Johnson	1,895	17.1	
Conservative	A Chadbond	1,820	16.4	
Conservative	M Walsh	1,699	15.4	
Conservative	P Eckersley	1,677	15.2	
Turnout		11,068	31.0	

=== Deane cum Lostock ward ===
Deane cum Lostock ward (3)
Party	Candidate	Votes	%	±%
Conservative	D Berry	1,406	25.3	
Conservative	F Rushton	1,359	24.4	
Conservative	R Ward	1,351	24.3	
Labour	S Harrison	506	9.1	
Labour	J Brown	483	8.7	
Labour	S Hill	454	8.2	
Turnout		5,559	30.0	

=== Derby ward ===
Derby ward (3)
Party	Candidate	Votes	%	±%
Labour	W Simpson	1,159	23.8	
Labour	J Taylor	1,143	23.5	
Labour	S Walsh	1,030	21.2	
Conservative	John Walsh	598	12.5	
Conservative	J Laycock	533	11.0	
Conservative	M Bleakley	468	9.6	
Turnout		4,866	29.0	

=== Farnworth North ward ===
Farnworth North ward (3)
Party	Candidate	Votes	%	±%
Labour	L Cunliffe	2,010	22.6	
Labour	R Neary	1,904	21.4	
Labour	G Brown	1,842	20.7	
Conservative	A Royse	1,243	14.0	
Conservative	T Rothwell	955	10.7	
Conservative	L Sharples	937	10.5	
Turnout		8,891	32.0	

=== Farnworth South ward ===
Farnworth South ward (3)
Party	Candidate	Votes	%	±%
Labour	J Wild	1,757	25.1	
Labour	W Hardman	1,712	24.5	
Labour	D Gilligan	1,633	23.4	
Conservative	C Shaw	653	9.3	
Conservative	G Waterson	632	9.0	
Conservative	I Torkington	604	8.6	
Turnout		6,991	27.0	

=== Great Lever ward ===
Great Lever ward (3)
Party	Candidate	Votes	%	±%
Conservative	J Shore	1,526	17.3	
Labour	V Urmston	1,492	16.9	
Labour	A Perry	1,471	16.7	
Conservative	G Woosey	1,456	16.5	
Labour	P Lowe	1,444	16.4	
Conservative	L Huyton	1,442	16.3	
Turnout		8,831	29.0	

=== Halliwell ward ===
Halliwell ward (3)
Party	Candidate	Votes	%	±%
Labour	E Hamer	1,533	18.6	
Labour	R Johnson	1,485	18.0	
Labour	G Riley	1,444	17.5	
Conservative	W Hall	1,280	15.5	
Conservative	R Stones	1,252	15.2	
Conservative	J Morris	1,248	15.1	
Turnout		8,242	27.0	

=== Heaton ward ===
Heaton ward (3)
Party	Candidate	Votes	%	±%
Conservative	B Allanson	1,598	30.2	
Conservative	J Hanscomb	1,524	28.8	
Conservative	B Hurst	1,504	28.4	
Labour	P Cunliffe	258	4.9	
Labour	N Morlidge	208	3.9	
Labour	T Hill	201	3.8	
Turnout		5,293	42.0	

=== Horwich North, Central and East ward ===
Horwich North, Central and East ward (3)
Party	Candidate	Votes	%	±%
Labour	A Oakley	1,947	16.6	
Labour	J McBurnie	1,680	14.3	
Labour	E Dobson	1,665	14.2	
Conservative	G Hind	1,377	11.8	
Liberal	E Kay	1,314	11.2	
Conservative	R Winstanley	1,076	9.2	
Liberal	A Ratcliffe	1,033	8.8	
Conservative	J Foster	942	8.0	
Communist	J Kay	676	5.8	
Turnout		11,710	42.0	

=== Horwich South and Blackrod ward ===
Horwich South and Blackrod ward (3)
Party	Candidate	Votes	%	±%
Independent	L Fearnhead	1,395	14.1	
Conservative	C Everin	1,200	12.1	
Labour	G Gardiner	1,173	11.8	
Labour	D Smith	1,017	10.2	
Conservative	J Jolley	964	9.7	
Labour	E Bracegirdle	926	9.3	
Independent	F Isherwood	891	9.0	
Independent Labour	L Watkinson	856	8.6	
Liberal	G Farrington	797	8.0	
Conservative	M Carrie	705	7.1	
Turnout		9,924	58.0	

=== Hulton and Rumworth ward ===
Hulton and Rumworth ward (3)
Party	Candidate	Votes	%	±%
Conservative	J Parkinson	1,991	20.3	
Conservative	A Gledhill	1,880	19.2	
Conservative	R Carr	1,872	19.1	
Labour	D Vause	1,362	13.9	
Labour	H Glynn	1,313	13.4	
Labour	T Regan	1,250	12.8	
Socialist (GB)	J O'Hara	122	1.2	
Turnout		9,790	35.0	

=== Kearsley ward ===
Kearsley ward (3)
Party	Candidate	Votes	%	±%
Liberal	J Rothwell	1,926	19.1	
Liberal	E Bell	1,700	16.9	
Labour	R Cornthwaite	1,668	16.5	
Liberal	K Holt	1,647	16.3	
Labour	B Molyneux	1,578	15.7	
Labour	T Lewis	1,564	15.5	
Turnout		10,083	40.6	

=== Little Lever ward ===
Little Lever ward (3)
Party	Candidate	Votes	%	±%
Conservative	K Hornby	1,111	14.6	
Conservative	J Lees	993	13.0	
Conservative	A Lawton	991	13.0	
Labour	J Robinson	938	12.3	
Liberal	N Narayan	886	11.6	
Labour	W Worthington	842	11.0	
Labour	C Lucas	752	9.9	
Liberal	J Waites	600	7.9	
Liberal	R Pemberton	516	6.8	
Turnout		7,629	39.0	

=== Smithills ward ===
Smithills ward (3)
Party	Candidate	Votes	%	±%
Conservative	D Priestly	2,209	24.5	
Conservative	M Howarth	2,204	24.4	
Conservative	S Collier	2,154	23.9	
Labour	T Hall	845	9.4	
Labour	N Spencer	816	9.0	
Labour	B Corless	799	8.9	
Turnout		9,027	28.0	

=== Tonge ward ===
Tonge ward (3)
Party	Candidate	Votes	%	±%
Conservative	S Harrison	2,129	19.4	
Conservative	K Knowles	1,950	17.8	
Conservative	J Rigby	1,929	17.6	
Labour	A Hooton	1,689	15.4	
Labour	A Grime	1,637	14.9	
Labour	Rigby	1,637	14.9	
Turnout		10,971	34.0	

=== West ward ===
West ward (3)
Party	Candidate	Votes	%	±%
Labour	R Howarth	1,376	21.6	
Labour	D Clarke	1,358	21.3	
Labour	H Devonish	1,341	21.0	
Conservative	M Foster	802	12.6	
Conservative	E Smith	756	11.9	
Conservative	J Wrench	741	11.6	
Turnout		6,374		

=== Westhoughton East and Hulton ward ===
Westhoughton East and Hulton ward (3)
Party	Candidate	Votes	%	±%
Conservative	G Smith	1,775	21.3	
Conservative	A Glover	1,750	21.0	
Conservative	J Smith	1,744	20.9	
Labour	P Jones	1,075	12.9	
Labour	C Knowles	1,015	12.2	
Labour	A Fairhurst	971	11.7	
Turnout		8,330	48.4	

=== Westhoughton North, Central and South ward ===
Westhoughton North, Central and South ward (3)
Party	Candidate	Votes	%	±%
Labour	W Kettle	2,273	23.2	
Labour	K Brown	1,971	20.1	
Labour	P Woodcock	1,940	19.8	
Independent	T Riley	1,465	15.0	
Conservative	J Roden	1,131	11.6	
Conservative	P Smith	1,009	10.3	
Turnout		9,789	49.7	
