= Muslim Engagement and Development =

British non-governmental organisation

Muslim Engagement and Development (MEND) (formerly iENGAGE) is a United Kingdom-based non-profit company and religious advocacy group. It focuses on media monitoring, lobbying in Westminster and improving the media and political literacy of British Muslims. The aim of the organisation is to tackle Islamophobia and to encourage political, civic and social engagement within British Muslim communities. Since 2021, it operates from Skelmersdale in Lancashire.

== Leadership ==
MEND was founded by Sufyan Ismail in June 2014 as a private company limited by shares, building on his previous work through iEngage (started in November 2008).

Ismail was replaced as MEND's chief executive officer by Shazad Amin in 2016 but retained significant control over the organisation until March 2018.

After Ismail's brief return as CEO in June 2024, Linsay Taylor was appointed his successor in January 2025.

== Activities ==
=== Media monitoring ===
MEND monitors daily media coverage pertaining to British Muslims and provides commentary on stories where it believes Islamophobic narratives are present. MEND is a recognised as a 'representative body' for British Muslims with the Independent Press Standards Organisation (IPSO).

=== Political advocacy ===
Over the years, MEND has extensively featured at fringe events in mainstream political party conferences. In 2014, prior to the upcoming general election, MEND's panel at the Conservative Party Conference featured the party's election strategist Lynton Crosby and Peter Oborne. MEND's panel at the Labour Party conference the same year featured Owen Jones and Keith Vaz, amongst others.

At the 2017 party conferences, MEND ran a fringe event at the Labour Party conference focussing on the empowerment of Muslim women with speakers including the politicians Diane Abbott, Kate Green, Rushanara Ali, and Naz Shah. At the 2017 Conservative Party conference, MEND ran a fringe event with speakers Nazir Afzal and Peter Oborne on the topic of the Conservative Party's relationship with Muslim communities.

In November 2017, MEND launched its annual Islamophobia Awareness Month (IAM) in Parliament. IAM is an inter-community campaign which runs throughout November each year in partnership with Police and Crime Commissioners (PCC), local councils, journalists and local media, councillors and local MPs, mosques, universities, schools, community organisations and others, in order to highlight the positive contributions of British Muslims and raise awareness of Islamophobia. At the parliamentary launch in 2017, the event was chaired by Stephen Kinnock, while speakers included Labour's Jeremy Corbyn, Wes Streeting, Naz Shah, Afzal Khan, Kate Green and the Liberal Democrat Lord Brian Paddick, as well as representatives from the NUS, Byline Media, Spinwatch and Hacked Off. Other speakers included the barrister Hashi Mohammed, as the representative to Max Hill QC, Independent Reviewer of Terrorism, Dr Rimla Akhtar, Chair of the Muslim Women's Sports Foundation, and the Reverend Steven Saxby.

The organisation has also produced dozens of briefing papers on concerns for British Muslims, including hate crime, press regulation, Stop and Search, Schedule 7, police and crime commissioners, halal slaughter, counter terror law, and more.

MEND is opposed to governmental anti-extremism programmes: MEND and Shakeel Begg stated its opposition to the appointment of British Muslim human rights activist Sara Khan as the anti-extremism coordinator, as she supports the government's Prevent anti-extremism programme. MEND has attacked Fiyaz Mughal, the founder of Faith Matters, as being islamophobic.

In 2018, a governor of St Stephen’s Primary School in east London said MEND had exerted pressure on him. MEND said it had helped parents to engage in a constructive dialogue with the school.

=== Advocacy ===
MEND operates an extensive grassroots community engagement programme whereby it seeks to improve the media and political literacy of British Muslims. Its objective is achieved via national awareness seminars on Islamophobia coupled with masterclasses on media and political engagement. MEND has local working groups nationally in cities and towns across the United Kingdom who work with their local Muslim and non-Muslim communities to tackle Islamophobia.

In 2014, with only the Met Police in London recording Islamophobic hate crime as a separately category of crime, MEND started working with UK constabularies to encourage them to record Islamophobia as a separate category of crime, similar to the treatment offered to racist and anti-Semitic hate crimes. Such a proposal was already a flagship demand in their Police and Crime Commissioner election manifesto published years prior. By 2015, MEND had successfully secured a commitment from a quarter (10 out of 43) of forces across England and Wales to record Islamophobic hate crime as a separate category of crime. In late 2015, the UK Government, building on MEND's work, announced that all UK forces will be required to record Islamophobic hate crimes in a separate category. The change came into force on the 1 April 2016.

In its approach to both general and local elections, MEND produces manifestos to advise candidates on the issues that are of interest to Muslims within their constituencies. In addition to this, MEND also provides summaries of major party manifestos in order to help British Muslims to understand the main issues that may concern them and opposing parties' positions on them. Leading up to the 2015 general election, Andrew Gilligan in The Daily Telegraph claimed that MEND saw itself as kingmaker in the upcoming election. MEND disputed the allegation and said that Andrew Gilligan had selectively quoted the comments made in reference to the importance of Muslims voting in the general election.

== Assessments ==
MEND's director of engagement Azad Ali has stated that the jihadist 2017 Westminster attack, in which Khalid Masood killed five people, was by a "lone wolf" and therefore "not terrorism".

A 2017 report by Henry Jackson Society (HJS) alleged the group had legitimised the killing of British troops and promoted conspiracy theories. Shortly after the HJS report was published, the chair of the All-Party Parliamentary Group on British Muslims plus three other MPs pulled out of a House of Commons event with MEND. Another MP, Wes Streeting, did not pull out, highlighting the group's explicit opposition to antisemitism and homophobia.

MEND responded to allegations of extremism with a rebuttal stating they are not 'anti-Government' or 'Extremists', they do not support or sympathise with terrorism, and they are not antisemitic. MEND responded to allegations of homophobia by stating that their 2015 and 2017 Manifestos both explicitly called for better legal protections against homophobic hate crime. The organisation stated that they unequivocally attest that hatred on the basis of religious, sexual, ethnic or gendered identity is categorically unacceptable and should be resisted wherever it is found. They also pointed to their work in developing a series of educational resources and training programs to aid in the teaching of Islamophobia, antisemitism and all forms of hatred.

On 14 March 2024, Michael Gove, then Secretary of State for Levelling Up, Housing and Communities, speaking in Parliament, accused MEND of having an "Islamist orientation and views". He further announced that MEND was one of five organisations that would be assessed against the UK Government's new non-statutory definition of extremism. MEND strongly rejected the allegations, and criticised the definition as a "blatant attack on civil liberties and free speech", though did not pursue a defamation lawsuit due to parliamentary privilege. No formal designations or sanctions were applied to any group before the dissolution of Parliament in May 2024.

== Accolades ==
In 2014, MEND (formerly iENGAGE)'s work was commended as "best practice" in "Human Rights Promotion and Protection" in a World Economic Forum report entitled Why Care about Faith?.

The Office for Democratic Institutions and Human Rights rated MEND the “best example for civil society organisations”.

Writing in The Parliament Magazine, Sajjad Karim stated that the EU could learn from MEND’s work on counter-radicalisation through engagement.

== See also ==
- Muslim Council of Britain
- Civil Service Islamic Society
- Islamic Forum of Europe
- Muslim Safety Forum
- The Muslim Vote
