= Yasmin Qureshi =

British politician and barrister (born 1963)

Yasmin Qureshi MP
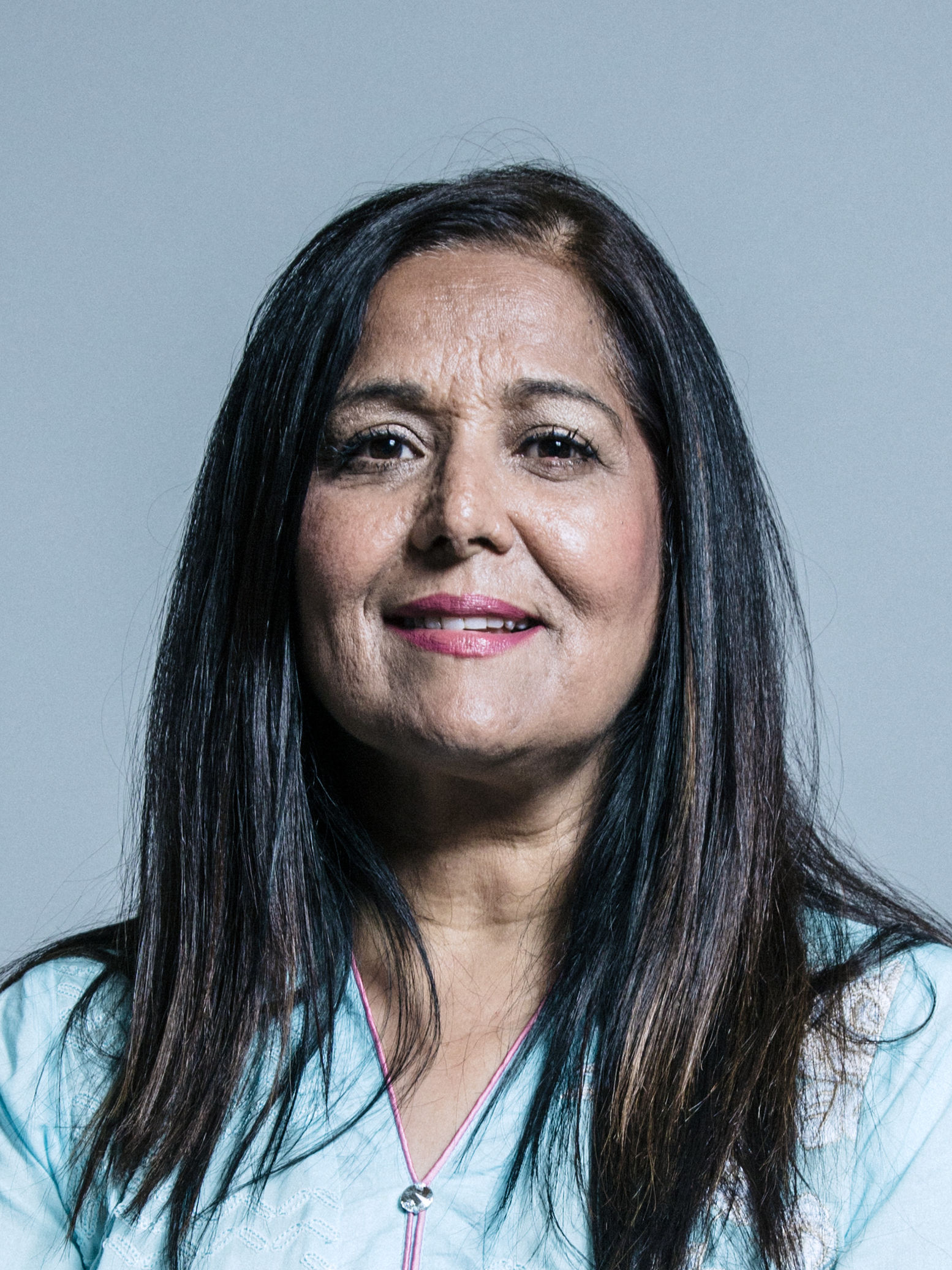
- Official portrait, 2017

Member of Parliament for Bolton South and Walkden Bolton South East (2010–2024)
- Incumbent
- Assumed office 6 May 2010
- Preceded by: Brian Iddon
- Majority: 6,743 (18.3%)
Shadow portfolios
2022–2023	Women and Equalities
2020–2021	International Development
2016–2020	Justice

Personal details
- Born: 5 July 1963 (age 63) Gujrat, Punjab, West Pakistan
- Party: Labour
- Education: London South Bank University (BA); University College London (LLM)
- Website: www.yasminqureshi.org.uk

Yasmin Qureshi (Punjabi: یاسمین قریشی; born 5 July 1963) is a British politician and barrister. She has been the Member of Parliament (MP) for Bolton South and Walkden since 2024, previously representing Bolton South East from 2010 to 2024. A member of the Labour Party, she headed the criminal legal section of the UN Mission in Kosovo, where she was later Judicial Administration Department Director.

== Early life ==
Qureshi was born on 5 July 1963 in Gujrat City, Pakistan, and moved to Britain when she was nine. Her father was an engineer, and the family lived in Watford. She is the youngest of three children.

She attended what is now London South Bank University, and graduated with a BA (Hons) Law degree before studying for and sitting her examinations for the Bar at the Council of Legal Education. She gained a Master of Laws at University College London.

== Legal career ==
Qureshi began her legal career with the Crown Prosecution Service as an in-house barrister, prosecuting on behalf of the Crown in numerous criminal cases.

She headed the criminal legal section of the UN Mission in Kosovo, and was selected as co-ordinator of the Criminal Legal Unit from 2000 to 2001. This role involved analysing legal systems in Kosovo to identify their limitations, with a focus on issues including people trafficking, domestic violence etc. She was then appointed Director of the Department of Judicial Administration in Kosovo.

She then worked as a human rights advisor to the former London mayor Ken Livingstone, a position she held from 2004 to 2008. Qureshi also chaired the Human Rights and Civil Liberties Working Group of the Association of Muslim Lawyers and was President of the Pakistan Club (UK).

Qureshi has undertaken community work for over 20 years, working with local law centres and the Citizen Advice Bureau alongside her legal career.

== Political career ==
At the age of 16, Qureshi joined the Labour Party and became active in local politics. She stood, unsuccessfully, for Labour in the London constituency of Brent East in 2005. She was elected at the 2010 general election in the safe Labour seat of Bolton South East.

She was elected in 2010 with 18,782 votes and 47.4% of the vote and has since achieved higher vote tallies and vote proportions in the following elections with an improved 25,676 votes and 60.7% vote share in 2017. In 2010, Qureshi, Rushanara Ali and Shabana Mahmood, elected at the same time, became Britain's first female Muslim MPs. Qureshi is also the first woman to be elected as the Member of Parliament for Bolton South East.

Qureshi has served on a number of Committees in her time in parliament. From her entry into parliament in 2010 until 2015 she was on the Justice Committee. From 2013 to 2015 she was part of the Home Affairs Committee. Following the 2015 election she was on the Foreign Affairs Committee. In early October 2016, Qureshi was appointed as a Shadow Minister for Justice by Labour leader Jeremy Corbyn.

From 2014 to 2015 Qureshi was on the Committee scrutinising the High Speed Rail (HS2) project. She sought to scrutinise impacts and costing of the controversial project in light of concerns over its slow progress and high cost. She stated that "it is important that the Department for Transport and the Secretary of State address these concerns fully in order that people can have confidence in the HS2 project", and highlighted how the benefits of HS2 needed to be felt by those in the North as well as the South: “there needs to be clarity and transparency over value for money and the benefits to the rest of the country, not just London".

Following Keir Starmer's election as Labour leader, Qureshi was appointed as Shadow Minister for International Development. On 15 November 2023, she resigned from the frontbench to vote for an SNP motion demanding a ceasefire in Gaza.

In 2024, Qureshi was appointed as Chair of the Westminster Foundation for Democracy. Qureshi was also appointed to the NATO Parliamentary Assembly and was given the role of UK Trade Envoy to Egypt.

=== Select committees ===
Prior to taking up her position as Shadow Justice Minister, Qureshi sat on a variety of select committees. These included:

Select committee	House	Date
Foreign Affairs Sub-Committee	Commons	Jan 2016 – Oct 2016
Foreign Affairs Committee	Commons	Jul 2015 – Oct 2016
High Speed Rail (London – West Midlands) Bill	Commons	Apr 2014 – Jul 2015
Home Affairs Committee	Commons	Nov 2013 – Mar 2015
Privacy and Injunctions	Joint	Jul 2011 – Mar 2012
Political and Constitutional Reform Committee	Commons	Jul 2011 – Dec 2011
Justice Committee	Commons	Jul 2010 – Mar 2015

=== All-party Parliamentary Groups ===
Qureshi is involved in a number of All-party Parliamentary Groups (APPGs). These include the APPGs on:

- Pakistan, which she chairs;
- Turkish Republic of Northern Cyprus;
- Dalits;
- Dyslexia and Other Specific Learning Disabilities;
- Greater Manchester;
- Hajj and Umrah, which she chairs;
- Religion in the Media;
- Srebrenica;
- Taxis;
- Dentistry and Oral Health, which she chairs;
- Primodos, which she chairs;
- Obesity, where she is the vice chair.

== Parliamentary campaigns ==
=== Primodos campaign ===
Since 2011, Qureshi has been campaigning for justice for the parents and children of those affected by Primodos, a historic hormone pregnancy test used in the 1960s and 1970s which significant evidence indicates leads to birth defects in children. She has worked to bring about an inquiry into a purported cover-up of information on the drug which may have taken place in the 1970s and 1980s. In 2017 she stated in the House of Commons that a Report into Primodos had been "condemned by MPs across the House as being a whitewash and misleading", and called for a formal inquiry.

=== Community pharmacies ===
Qureshi has also campaigned against cuts to community pharmacies. Speaking in 2016 she stated that “cutting funding for community pharmacies threatens patient care and safety" and that "pharmacies are vital local assets and these cuts are totally short-sighted".

=== Rohingya crisis ===
In response to the Myanmar's Rohingya crisis Qureshi has called for the government to condemn the crisis and work more with the international community to seek a rapid end to it. She commented that "this is one of the worst outbreaks of violence in decades, yet the international community is effectively remaining silent as we watch another Srebrenica and Rwanda unfold before our eyes".

=== Upskirting bill ===
Qureshi campaigned extensively to have 'upskirting' criminalised as a specific sexual offence, arguing that such legislation was long overdue. In response to Conservative MP Christopher Chope's blocking the progress of a bill to outlaw upskirting, Qureshi spoke frequently in the House of Commons in criticism of this action, stating "delays in getting to this point were totally unnecessary and have caused needless suffering".

=== Labelling of meat ===
In May 2014, Qureshi opposed mandatory labelling of meat coming from animals killed by halal and kosher methods. Despite significant evidence to the contrary, she drew attention to studies which indicated that halal methods of slaughtering may not be more painful than stunning, saying "a myth is being perpetuated that somehow kosher and halal methods, carried out as they should be, are more painful and cause more suffering to the animal, but that is incorrect".

=== Other campaigns ===
Qureshi has also supported a number of other campaigns while in parliament. These include seeking to reduce the impacts of changes in State Pension Age, calls for citizens to be able to opt-out of unsolicited phone calls from companies, and questioning the pace of government cuts and the effect this is having on crime and local communities.

== Political positions ==
=== Court building sales ===
Qureshi has been a stringent critic of the widespread closure of courts and sales of court buildings throughout her time as an MP. She argues that doing so without due process and in a rushed manner "piles yet more pressure on the remaining courts and risks hearings being further delayed and rescheduled", with the impact of "distressing victims and witnesses, many of whom are now forced to travel much greater distances".

=== Prison system ===
Qureshi has been a consistent critic of Conservative governments' running of the prison system. In the Huffington Post, she argued that the 14% rate of prison officers leaving after a year, the record rates of prisoner suicides and the increasing safety crisis as noted by inspections indicate that prison funding and staff numbers had been cut too rapidly.

=== Syrian bombing ===
Qureshi was strongly against the dropping of bombs in Syria; after travelling on a fact-finding mission with the Foreign Affairs Committee, she argued that while the bombs would certainly cause "many innocent civilian deaths", the evidence that the strikes would significantly weaken ISIS was unclear.

=== General Election Recall ===
In January 2025, Qureshi spoke against the petition to hold a new General Election, describing those who had signed the petition, over 3 million signatures, as responding to "disinformation" and "foreign interference".

== Awards and nominations ==
In January 2013 and 2015, Qureshi was nominated for the Politician of the Year award at the British Muslim Awards. In January 2014, she was awarded the Politician of the Year award at the British Muslim Awards.

In July 2021, Qureshi received an honorary doctorate from the University of Bolton. Qureshi was awarded a Doctor of Social Science for her outstanding contribution to politics and the local community.

== Controversies ==
In 2010, Qureshi was banned from driving for 6 months for driving without insurance and using a mobile phone, whilst already having 9 points.

In February 2014, during a parliamentary debate on the Palestine crisis, she said of the persecution of Jewish people in the Holocaust: "Their properties, homes, and land—everything—were taken away, and they were deprived of rights. Of course, many millions perished", before going on to say that "It is quite strange that some of the people who are running the state of Israel seem to be quite complacent and happy to allow the same to happen in Gaza". In response, Karen Pollock of the Holocaust Educational Trust said: "We expect our politicians to speak responsibly and sensitively about the past and about events today. These lazy and deliberate distortions have no place in British politics". Qureshi apologised to any who were offended by her words, and stated that "the debate was about the plight of the Palestinian people, and in no way did I mean to equate events in Gaza with the Holocaust", adding that "I know the Holocaust was the most brutal act of genocide of the 20th century, and no one should seek to underestimate its impact".

In 2017, The Times stated that Qureshi accepted a £5,000 donation from Sufyan Ismail but failed to declare it; it was found that the donation was in fact declared on time and in keeping with parliamentary procedure, it was declared through Ismail's company name 'One Group' and can be found on public parliamentary donation records.

== Personal life ==
Qureshi is married to Nadeem Ashraf, whom she employs as Constituency Caseworker and Administrative Officer.

In October 2020, Qureshi tested positive for COVID-19, and was admitted to Royal Bolton Hospital with pneumonia, after nearly two weeks.

Parliament of the United Kingdom
Preceded by Brian Iddon	Member of Parliament for Bolton South East; 2010–2024	Constituency abolished
New constituency	Member of Parliament for Bolton South and Walkden; 2024–present	Incumbent
