= 1960 Bolton East by-election =

UK parliamentary by-election

The 1960 Bolton East by-election was a by-election held for the British House of Commons constituency of Bolton East in Lancashire on 16 November 1960. It was won by the Conservative Party candidate Edwin Taylor.

== Vacancy ==
The seat became vacant when the sitting Conservative Member of Parliament Philip Bell, QC, was appointed as a County Court Judge. He had held the seat since the 1951 general election.

The by-election saw the decision of the Liberal Party to field a candidate, which broke a local pact which had held for 10 years whereby the Liberals left the Bolton East seat alone, and in return the Conservatives did not stand in Bolton West; the pact had achieved its objective of preventing the Labour Party from winning either.

== Result ==
Taylor was elected by a margin of 641 votes over Labour candidate Robert Howarth, with the Liberal candidate Frank Byers securing a quarter of the vote. Dissension within the Labour Party over nuclear disarmament was thought to have helped Taylor win.

At the 1964 general election, a more organised Labour campaign in Bolton East saw Taylor voted out by a margin of more than 3,000 votes. A Conservative stood in Bolton West for the first time since 1950, resulting in a Labour gain from the Liberal Arthur Holt by roughly the same margin.

Bolton East by-election, 1960
Party	Candidate	Votes	%	±%
Conservative	Edwin Taylor	15,499	37.8	−15.0
Labour	Robert Howarth	14,858	36.2	−11.0
Liberal	Frank Byers	10,173	24.8	New
New Conservative	John E. Dayton	493	1.2	New
Majority		641	1.6	−4.0
Turnout		41,023		
Conservative hold		Swing	-2.0	

== Previous result ==
1959 general election: Bolton East
Party	Candidate	Votes	%	±%
Conservative	Philip Bell	25,885	52.8	−0.8
Labour	R. Hains	23,153	47.2	+0.8
Majority		2,732	5.6	−1.6
Turnout		49,038	80.1	
Conservative hold		Swing	-0.8	
