= Sufyan Ismail =

British entrepreneur and philanthropist (born 1975)

Sufyan Gulam Ismail
- Born: 2 September 1975 (age 50); Gujarat, India
- Citizenship: British
- Education: University of Manchester
- Occupations: Entrepreneur and philanthropist
- Years active: 2001–
- Employer: Deloitte (1998–2000)
- Successor: Shazad Amin (2016–2024), Linsay Taylor (2025–)
- Children: 4
- Website: www.sufyanismail.com

Sufyan Gulam Ismail (born 2 September 1975) is a British serial entrepreneur and philanthropist, who has been ranked amongst the 500 most influential Muslims in the world on five occasions. He is the founder of 1st Ethical, a UK FSA-authorised, Shariah-compliant investment firm, of the tax consultancy OneE, and of the Muslim Engagement and Development (MEND) advocacy group that aims to combat Islamophobia and champion Muslim involvement in media, politics and civic engagement.

== Early life and education ==
Ismail was born as one of eight children of Rabia and Gulam Khonat, and grew up in a working class neighbourhood of Blackburn. He studied economics and corporate finance at the University of Manchester, graduating in 1998. He was involved in fundraising efforts directed at Muslim businesses on behalf of Islamic student societies. During his final exams his father died in a car accident. Ismail worked for the accountancy firm Deloitte Touche from 1998 to 2000. He received an advanced financial planning qualification (AFPC) in the summer of 2001.

== Business ==
=== 1st Ethical ===
In September 2001, he launched 1st Ethical Ltd. The company became the UK's first FSA-authorized financial services company aimed at the Muslim community. It specialized in regulated investments and pensions advice with a strong focus on property investment. From 2002 to 2006, the company operated out of Preston, Lancashire.

By 2003, the firm had become a national brand and was among the UK's fastest growing companies. It was reported to have had 18 employees and a commission income of £500,000 in its first year of operation. In 2004, 1st Ethical staff advocated for Islamic inheritance planning opportunities on the Walsall-based Radio Ramadhan. As of 2005, Ismail coordinated his plans for Islamic child trust funds with the Business and Economics Committee of the Muslim Council of Britain, and aimed to set up an Islamic venture capital fund. His private equity firm business was eventually launched as the 1st Ethical Musharaka Fund, which invested in start up businesses by young Muslims.

In June 2006, Ismail founded 1st Ethical Tax Consulting Ltd and in January 2007, 1st Ethical Group Ltd, renamed in January 2008 to OneE Tax Ltd (a tax consultancy) and OneE Group Ltd (a holding company) respectively. The new company was a specialist wealth advisory service which offered the facilitation of tax breaks through R&D investment and other UK tax reliefs. OneE Group operated out of offices in Greater Manchester, and London employing approximately 80 staff. The company's growth resulted in it being ranked 57th in the Sunday Times Fast Track listing in 2011 and 53rd in the Sunday Times Profit Track Listing in 2012.

In 2014, Ismail exited OneE Tax to focus on humanitarian relief and philanthropy.

== Philanthropy ==
In 2003, Ismail set up 1st Ethical Charitable Trust, a faith-based educational charity that worked with mosques, darul ulooms and Muslim primary, secondary and supplementary faith schools in the UK to establish curricula on financial literacy (mu‘āmalāt) and social responsibility. The Trust was among the first supporters of the Curriculum for Cohesion initiative, launched in 2011 by Matthew Wilkinson and principally sponsored by Mohammed Amin. Ismail and the Trust donated over £5 million to humanitarian causes globally, including in Zambia, Malawi, Philippines and India. . In 2016, the Trust was among the key organisations involved in the successful campaign for the British government to provide Sharia-compliant loans to Muslim students.

In 2014, Ismail founded Muslim Engagement and Development (MEND), a specialist initiative geared towards tackling Islamophobia by advocacy work with the media and the British parliament. Its work on improving the media and political literacy of grassroots British Muslims was recognised by the World Economic Forum in 2014, and later also by the Office for Democratic Institutions and Human Rights. MEND has trained over 40,000 Muslim on tackling Islamophobia and played a critical role on legally defending UK Muslims against attacks. MEND has worked to put prayer and ablution facilities in place in numerous schools and workplaces in the UK. Ismail spoke alongside the local police and crime commissioner at a conference on Islamophobia organised by MEND in Blackburn in 2015. In 2016, he stepped down from the position of MEND's chief executive officer. Ismail is no longer involved in MEND which operates via an independent Board.

== Publications ==
As a proponent of non-interest based finance, Ismail wrote on Islamic financing models. His papers covered the prohibition of interest in Islamic law, Islamic inheritance laws and UK wills, zakat and insurance in Islam. His company published and he contributed to a university textbook on Islamic finance published by the 1st Ethical Charitable Trust in 2010.

== Political involvement ==
In a comment preceding the 2015 United Kingdom general election, Ismail observed that the heavy concentration of Muslim vote in Britain has the potential to enable the Muslim community to influence the balance of political power in hung parliament situations.

== Awards ==
- North West Entrepreneur of the Year, awarded by Shell Livewire (2003)
- Mayor of Bolton award for contribution to the town's economy (2003)
- Ethnic Business section award of the North Manchester Business Awards, granted by the Bolton Evening News (2004)
- New Business of the Year award from the North West Institute of Chartered Accountants (2004)
- nominated for the Entrepreneur of the Future Growing Business Award by the Confederation of British Industry (2005)
- Lloyds TSB Professional Excellence Award
- Finalist in Ernst and Young Entrepreneur of the Year
- 57th place in Sunday Times Fast Track Top 100, 2011
- 53rd Place in Sunday Times Profit Track Top 100, 2012
- 2015 – 500 Most influential Muslims in the World on 5 separate occasions

== Personal life ==
Sufyan lives in Greater Manchester and is married, with four children.

== Bibliography ==
- Housby, Elaine S. (2005). The development of the Islamic financial tradition in contemporary Britain (PDF) (PhD thesis). Open University.
- O'Toole, Therese; Braginskaia, Ekaterina (2016), Public Faith and Finance: Faith Responses to the Financial Crisis (PDF), Bristol: University of Bristol
