= Bolton South and Walkden =

UK Parliament constituency (since 2024)

- County constituency for the House of Commons
- Interactive map of boundaries since 2024
- Location within North West England
- County: Greater Manchester
- Electorate: 79,622 (2024)
- Major settlements: Bolton, Walkden, Great Lever, Kearsley, Little Hulton

Current constituency
- Created: 2024
- Member of Parliament: Yasmin Qureshi (Labour)
- Seats: One
- Created from: Bolton South East (part); Worsley and Eccles South (part)

Bolton South and Walkden is a constituency of the House of Commons in the UK Parliament. Created as a result of the 2023 review of Westminster constituencies, it was first contested at the 2024 general election. Since 2024, it has been represented by Labour's Yasmin Qureshi, who was MP for the predecessor seat of Bolton South East from 2010 to 2024.

== Constituency profile ==
The constituency is located in Greater Manchester and covers parts of the City of Salford and the Metropolitan Borough of Bolton. It is almost entirely urban or suburban and includes the southern areas of the large town of Bolton and the smaller towns of Walkden, Farnworth and Kearsley. Like much of Greater Manchester, the area has a history of textile manufacturing. Bolton was once a world centre for cotton spinning, and the area also has a history of coal mining.

Compared to national averages, deprivation in the constituency is high and residents have low levels of education and professional employment. The constituency is more ethnically diverse than the rest of Greater Manchester and the rest of the country; 65% of residents are White, 24% are Asian (mostly Pakistani) and 6% are Black. White people make up over 90% of residents in Walkden and Kearsley, whilst Asians are a majority of the population in parts of Bolton.

At the most recent local council elections in 2024, most areas in the constituency elected Labour Party councillors, although independents were elected in Farnworth and Kearsley. Voters in the constituency strongly supported leaving the European Union in the 2016 referendum, with an estimated 63% voting in favour of Brexit.

== Boundaries ==
Further to the 2023 boundary review, the constituency was defined as comprising the following (as they existed on 1 December 2020):

- The Metropolitan Borough of Bolton wards of Farnworth, Great Lever, Harper Green, Kearsley, and Rumworth.
- The City of Salford wards of Little Hulton, Walkden North, and Walkden South.

The Bolton Borough wards were formerly part of Bolton South East and the Salford City wards part of Worsley and Eccles South - with both constituencies being abolished as a result of the 2023 review.

Following a local government boundary review in Bolton which came into effect in May 2023, the constituency now comprises the following from the 2024 general election:

- The Metropolitan Borough of Bolton wards of: Farnworth North; Farnworth South; Great Lever; Kearsley; Queens Park & Central (part); Rumworth (nearly all); and a very small part of Hulton.
- The City of Salford wards of: Little Hulton; Walkden North; Walkden South.

== Members of Parliament ==
Election	Member	Party
2024	Yasmin Qureshi	Labour

== Elections ==
=== Elections in the 2020s ===
General election 2024: Bolton South and Walkden
Party	Candidate	Votes	%	±%
Labour	Yasmin Qureshi	15,093	40.9	−15.7
Reform	Julie Pattison	8,350	22.6	+17.2
Workers Party	Jack Khan	4,673	12.7	N/A
Conservative	Mohammed Afzal	4,170	11.3	−20.4
Green	Philip Kochitty	2,827	7.7	+5.3
Liberal Democrats	Gemma-Jane Bowker	1,384	3.7	−0.2
Independent	Reis Halliwell	433	1.2	N/A
Majority		6,743	18.3	−6.6
Turnout		36,930	46.4	−11.9
Registered electors		79,622		
Labour hold		Swing	−16.5	

=== Elections in the 2010s ===
2019 notional result
Party	Vote	%
Labour	24,890	56.6
Conservative	13,961	31.7
Brexit Party	2,361	5.4
Liberal Democrats	1,695	3.9
Green	1,077	2.4
Turnout	43,984	58.1
Electorate	75,716	
