= Bolton East =

Parliamentary constituency in the United Kingdom, 1950–1983

- Former borough constituency for the House of Commons
- County: Lancashire, until 1974; Greater Manchester from 1974
- Major settlements: Bolton

1950–1983
- Seats: One
- Created from: Bolton
- Replaced by: Bolton North East and Bolton South East

Bolton East was a borough constituency in the town of Bolton in Greater Manchester (formerly in Lancashire). It returned one Member of Parliament (MP) to the House of Commons of the Parliament of the United Kingdom.

The constituency was created for the 1950 general election. It was abolished in boundary changes for the 1983 general election, when most of Bolton East became part of the new constituency of Bolton South East.

== Boundaries ==
Bolton East in Lancashire, boundaries used 1974-83

The County Borough of Bolton wards of Astley Bridge, Bradford, Church, Darcy Lever-cum-Breightmet, East, Great Lever, Hulton, North, and Tonge.

== Members of Parliament ==
Election	Member	Party
1950	Alfred Booth	Labour
1951	Philip Bell	Conservative
1960 by-election	Edwin Taylor	Conservative
1964	Robert Howarth	Labour
1970	Laurance Reed	Conservative
Feb 1974	David Young	Labour
1983	constituency abolished: see Bolton North East and Bolton South East	

== Election results ==
=== Elections in the 1950s ===
General election 1950: Bolton East
Party	Candidate	Votes	%	±%
Labour	Alfred Booth	24,826	45.48	
Conservative	Philip Bell	21,117	38.68	
Liberal	Arthur Holt	8,647	15.84	
Majority		3,709	6.80	
Turnout		54,590	87.46	
Labour win (new seat)				

General election 1951: Bolton East
Party	Candidate	Votes	%	±%
Conservative	Philip Bell	27,106	50.33	+11.6
Labour	Alfred Booth	26,751	49.7	+4.2
Majority		355	0.66	N/A
Turnout		53,857	84.75	−2.71
Conservative gain from Labour		Swing	+3.8	

General election 1955: Bolton East
Party	Candidate	Votes	%	±%
Conservative	Philip Bell	26,145	53.60	+3.3
Labour	Alfred Booth	22,634	46.40	−3.3
Majority		3,511	7.20	+6.5
Turnout		58,779	79.19	−5.5
Conservative hold		Swing	+3.3	

General election 1959: Bolton East
Party	Candidate	Votes	%	±%
Conservative	Philip Bell	25,885	52.8	−0.8
Labour	Ronald Haines	23,153	47.2	+0.8
Majority		2,732	5.6	−1.6
Turnout		59,038	80.95	+1.7
Conservative hold		Swing	−0.8	

=== Elections in the 1960s ===
1960 Bolton East by-election
Party	Candidate	Votes	%	±%
Conservative	Edwin Taylor	15,499	37.8	−15.0
Labour	Robert Howarth	14,858	36.2	−11.0
Liberal	Frank Byers	10,173	24.8	New
New Conservative	John E. Dayton	493	1.2	New
Majority		641	1.6	−4.0
Turnout		41,023		
Conservative hold		Swing	-2.0	

General election 1964: Bolton East
Party	Candidate	Votes	%	±%
Labour	Robert Howarth	21,937	46.09	
Conservative	Edwin Taylor	18,785	39.47	
Liberal	A. Cooper	6,873	14.44	
Majority		3,152	6.62	N/A
Turnout		47,595	80.36	
Labour gain from Conservative		Swing		

General election 1966: Bolton East
Party	Candidate	Votes	%	±%
Labour	Robert Howarth	26,613	59.21	
Conservative	Edwin Taylor	18,331	40.79	
Majority		8,282	18.42	
Turnout		44,944	76.96	
Labour hold		Swing		

=== Elections in the 1970s ===
General election 1970: Bolton East
Party	Candidate	Votes	%	±%
Conservative	Laurance Reed	22,769	50.52	
Labour	Robert Howarth	22,298	49.48	
Majority		471	1.04	N/A
Turnout		45,067	73.50	
Conservative gain from Labour		Swing		

General election February 1974: Bolton East
Party	Candidate	Votes	%	±%
Labour	David Young	19,833	41.28	
Conservative	Laurance Reed	18,220	37.93	
Liberal	Tim J. Akeroyd	8,728	18.17	
National Front	G. Booth	1,259	2.62	New
Majority		1,613	3.35	N/A
Turnout		48,040	80.58	
Labour gain from Conservative		Swing		

General election October 1974: Bolton East
Party	Candidate	Votes	%	±%
Labour	David Young	21,569	46.77	
Conservative	John Heddle	17,504	37.95	
Liberal	Tim J. Akeroyd	5,792	12.56	
National Front	G. Booth	1,106	2.40	
More Prosperous Britain	Harold Smith	149	0.32	New
Majority		4,065	8.82	
Turnout		46,120	76.64	
Labour hold		Swing		

General election 1979: Bolton East
Party	Candidate	Votes	%	±%
Labour	David Young	21,920	47.60	
Conservative	R. Baldwin	20,068	43.58	
Liberal	S. B. Lawrence	3,603	7.82	
National Front	J. Hamilton	457	0.99	
Majority		1,852	4.02	
Turnout		46,048	78.74	
Labour hold		Swing		

== See also ==
- List of parliamentary constituencies in Greater Manchester
