= Laurance Reed =

Member of Parliament for Bolton East
- In office 1970–1974
- Preceded by: Robert Howarth
- Succeeded by: David Young
- Constituency: Bolton East

Personal details
- Born: Laurance Douglas Reed; July 24, 1937
- Party: Conservative
- Education: University College, Oxford

Laurance Douglas Reed (born 4 December 1937) is a former British Conservative Party politician and political writer.

== Early life ==
The son of Douglas Austin Reed and his wife Mary Ellen Philpott, he was educated at Gresham's School in Norfolk and University College, Oxford. Reed served his National Service with the Royal Navy from 1956 to 1958, and from 1963 to 1966 worked and studied the EEC at Brussels, Bruges, Leiden, Luxembourg, Strasbourg, Paris, Rome, Bologna and Geneva.

Reed joined the Royal Navy for his National Service and as a young naval officer he took part in Operation Grapple, Britain's first series of thermonuclear tests held in the Central Pacific in 1957. His ship was 26 miles from ground zero. He wore a hood, dark goggles and protective clothing, but still saw the flash and felt the heat on his back and shoulders. Looking back, he always used to say that the tests were fascinating to observe, but that it was terrifying to think what such weapons could do to a city and its inhabitants.

In 1960, he went up to University College Oxford to read Law. During his time as an undergraduate he joined the editorial staff of the magazine Isis, campaigned for the abolition of capital punishment and held office in the Oxford University Conservative Association. He also became the Treasurer of the Oxford Union debating society, but resigned from that position in protest when the Oxford Union refused to accept women as full members.

Immediately after graduating, Reed went to Europe for two years to study the workings and the institutions of the EEC, or the Common Market, as it was then called. He visited each of the six member states but spent most of his time in Brussels and Strasbourg. He met politicians, diplomats, civil servants, businessmen, economists, lawyers and academics. They were all keen that Britain should join. On his return home he wrote a book on the subject, 'Europe in a Shrinking World', which put the economic and political case for British membership. It was only in 1969 that the green light was given to negotiations for British membership. The United Kingdom joined the European Economic Community (as it then was) on 1 January 1973, with Denmark and Ireland.

This was the first of a number of books which Reed researched and wrote over the years. One of them was about marine pollution, which was written when he was a director of the Association Européenne Océanique (Eurocean), an organisation founded to promote European cooperation in the exploration of the deep sea. Another book told the history of Soay, an island just off Skye in the Inner Hebrides of Scotland, where he owned a house and lived for fourteen years.

== Political career ==
Reed worked at the Public Sector Research Unit from 1967 to 1970, and was elected as Member of Parliament for Bolton East in 1970, serving until 1974.

In September, 1971, in a telegram to the prime minister of the day, Edward Heath, Reed proposed the forcible repatriation of citizens of the Republic of Ireland living in the UK as a means of persuading the Irish premier, Jack Lynch, to act against terrorists. Part of his telegram read: "Bolton and Lancashire would take a poor view of any show of weakness over the continuing use of the Republic as a base for the IRA gunmen."

Reed was elected to Parliament in June 1970, winning the seat from Labour. The following year he became Secretary of the Conservative Backbench Committee on the Environment and persuaded the Government to finance an environmental improvement scheme in Britain's old industrial cities. On Britain's accession to the EEC he was made the Parliamentary Private Secretary to the Minister for Europe. He lost his seat at the election of February 1974, when Ted Heath's Government was defeated by Harold Wilson's Labour Party. Reed wrote a brief account of his time in Parliament.

Among notable people whom Reed met and got to know in the course of his life were John Inman, also known as Mr Humphries in Are You Being Served?, with whom he worked in the display department at Austin Reed of Regent Street; Jacques Cousteau, the French underwater explorer who was the driving force behind Eurocean; and Fred Dibnah, the steeplejack and engineer who lived in Bolton East, his former UK Parliament constituency.

== Personal life ==
Reed lives in Beaconsfield, Buckinghamshire.

== Publications ==
- Planning for Survival, by Garth Collyer, Richard Britten, Ian Mackeson-Sandback, Lawrance Reed, and Ann Retallack (London, 1961)
- Europe in a Shrinking World: a Technological Perspective, by Laurance Douglas Reed (Oldbourne & Co., London, 1967)
- Ocean-Space: Europe's New Frontier by Laurance Reed (London, 1969)
- An Ocean of Waste: some proposals for clearing the seas around Britain, by Laurance Reed (London, 1972)
- Political Consequences of North Sea Oil (1973)
- The Soay of Our Forefathers (1986)
- Philpott of Fordingbridge (1994)

== Sources ==
- Who's Who 2003 (A. & C. Black, London, 2003) page 1799
- Bolton Evening News, 6 September 1971.
- Famous Boltonians
- Find in a Library

Parliament of the United Kingdom
Preceded by Robert Howarth	Member of Parliament for Bolton East; 1970–Feb 1974	Succeeded by David Young
