= David Young (Labour politician) =

British politician

Member of Parliament for Bolton East
- Preceded by: Laurance Reed
- Succeeded by: Constituency abolished

Member of Parliament for Bolton South East
- Preceded by: Constituency established
- Succeeded by: Brian Iddon

Personal details
- Born: 12 October 1930
- Died: 1 January 2003 (aged 72)

David Wright Young (12 October 1930 – 1 January 2003), was a British Labour politician.

Born on 12 October 1930 in Greenock, Young attended the Greenock Academy, St Paul's College in Cheltenham, and the University of Glasgow. At first he was a teacher, becoming head of the History department, but he later became an insurance executive in Coventry.

Young joined the Labour Party in 1955, and he was Chair of Coventry East Constituency Labour Party from 1964 to 1968. The Labour MP for the constituency at this time was Richard Crossman, a senior figure on the left of the party. In 1973 he was elected to Nuneaton Borough Council, serving for three years.

After a succession of candidacies in unwinnable seats (South Worcestershire in 1959, Banbury in 1966, and Bath in 1970), Young was elected to the House of Commons on his fourth attempt for Bolton East in February 1974. He served as Parliamentary Secretary to Fred Mulley from 1977 to 1979.

Following boundary changes, he became MP for Bolton South East in 1983. Although willing to continue, he was replaced as Labour candidate for the seat by Brian Iddon before the 1997 general election.

Young died on the New Year's Day of 2003, at the age of 72.

Parliament of the United Kingdom
Preceded by Laurance Reed	Member of Parliament for Bolton East; Feb 1974–1983	Constituency abolished
New constituency	Member of Parliament for Bolton South East; 1983–1997	Succeeded by Brian Iddon
