= Alfred Booth =

British Congregational lay preacher and politician

Mayor of Bolton
- In office 1941–1942
- Preceded by: Walter Wharton Tong
- Succeeded by: James Bleakley

Member of Parliament for Bolton East
- In office 23 February 1950 – 25 October 1951
- Preceded by: Constituency created
- Succeeded by: Philip Bell

Personal details
- Born: 24 February 1893
- Died: 19 December 1965 (aged 72)
- Party: Labour

Military service
- Allegiance: United Kingdom
- Service: British Army
- Years of service: 1914–1918
- Unit: Lancashire Fusiliers

Alfred Booth (24 February 1893 – 19 December 1965) was a British Congregational lay preacher and politician.

Booth served with the Lancashire Fusiliers during World War I. In 1933, he was elected to Bolton Borough Council, and he was Mayor of Bolton in 1941–42. He was also vice-president of the Cremation Society, and chair of the Bolton National Savings Committee.

Booth was elected as the Labour Member of Parliament (MP) for Bolton East in 1950, but lost the seat in 1951, and failed to retake it in 1955.

Parliament of the United Kingdom
New constituency	Member of Parliament for Bolton East; 1950 – 1951	Succeeded by Philip Bell
