= Philip Ingress Bell =

British barrister and judge

His Honour Philip Bell TD QC

Member of Parliament for Bolton East
- In office 25 October 1951 – 16 November 1960
- Preceded by: Alfred Booth
- Succeeded by: Edwin Taylor

Personal details
- Born: 10 January 1900 Kingston upon Thames, Surrey, England
- Died: 12 September 1986 (aged 86) Uckfield, East Sussex, England
- Party: Conservative
- Education: Queen's College, Oxford
- Occupation: Barrister

Military service
- Allegiance: United Kingdom
- Service: Royal Navy (1918–1920); British Army (1939–1945)
- Years of service: 1918–1920; 1939–1945
- Rank: Major
- Unit: East Lancashire Regiment
- Awards: Territorial Decoration

Philip Ingress Bell, TD, QC (10 January 1900 – 12 September 1986) was a British barrister and judge, who also had a political career.

== Early life ==
Bell, whose father Geoffrey Vincent Bell was a sculptor, was educated at Stonyhurst College. While at school he wrote a book called Idols and Idylls, subtitled "Essays by a Public School Boy"; it was published by Burns & Oates in 1918. When he came to the age of 18 during the First World War, he entered the Royal Navy as a Cadet, and attended the Royal Naval College in Keyham, Plymouth. He was a midshipman from 1918 to 1920 when he was discharged. Bell then went up to Queen's College, Oxford where he studied jurisprudence and obtained a Bachelor of Civil Law degree. While at Oxford he was captain of the Oxford University Boxing Club.

== Legal career ==
In 1925 Bell was called to the Bar by the Inner Temple, and went into practice on the Northern circuit, based in Lancashire. He enjoyed a good practice at the bar, and in 1933 married the daughter of the High Sheriff of Lancashire. In 1939 he enlisted again in the Territorial Army as a lieutenant, and was posted to the East Lancashire Regiment in France. After making a successful return to England from Dunkirk, he joined the Judge Advocate General to the Forces' staff, and was an acting major serving through Normandy and in the team at the Belsen Trial.

== Political involvement ==
At the end of the war, Bell returned to his practice. In 1950 he was adopted as Conservative Party candidate for Bolton East, the more Conservative constituency in Bolton. He was defeated by 3,709 votes, but a Liberal candidate won more than twice that. Given the Liberal strength in Bolton West, the Bolton Conservative and Liberal associations adopted the "Huddersfield formula" which had been negotiated in the two Huddersfield constituencies for 1950, whereby each agreed to contest one seat only, and to support the other's campaign.

== Parliamentary career ==
With this help, in the 1951 general election, Bell was elected by 355 votes. His maiden speech in March 1952 concerned the National Health Service Bill which allowed the NHS to charge for medical appliances; he called for pensioners to be exempt from charges. In 1952 he was made a Queen's Counsel. He introduced a private members' bill a few days later to allow law cases to be transferred from the Crown Court to the Court of Chancery of the County Palatine of Lancaster. He often commented on foreign and colonial affairs, and supported the Television Bill of 1954, arguing that advertisers were not evil. He specifically advocated that religious bodies be able to become television contractors.

In the 1955 general election Bell improved his majority to 3,511. He supported retention of capital punishment in the most extreme cases, and also signed an amendment which would allow Judges to sentence murderers to whipping in addition to any other punishment. In February 1958 he opposed the government's Recreational Charities Bill, arguing that it extended the definition of charitable purposes too widely. He also opposed the Litter Bill introduced by fellow Conservative MP Rupert Speir, saying that it criminalised those who dropped litter but did not realise it. Bell also opposed the Legitimacy Bill in 1959, contending that removing the legal disabilities of illegitimate children would be a risk against the institution of marriage.

== Judgeship ==
Bell, who had continued his legal practice while in Parliament, was made a County Court Judge in 1960, thereby giving up his seat. He was already intending to finish his political career. At the end of 1971 he was made a Circuit Judge, retiring in 1975 on reaching the age of 75.

== Sources ==
- M. Stenton and S. Lees, Who's Who of British MPs, Vol. IV (Harvester Press, 1981)

Parliament of the United Kingdom
Preceded by Alfred Booth	Member of Parliament for Bolton East; 1951–1960	Succeeded by Edwin Taylor
