= Bolton South East =

UK Parliament constituency (1983–2024)

Coordinates: 53.566°N 2.400°W

- Former borough constituency for the House of Commons
- Boundary of Bolton South East in Greater Manchester

- Location of Greater Manchester within England
- County: Greater Manchester
- Population: 101,747 (2011 census)
- Electorate: 69,088 (December 2010)
- Major settlements: Bolton, Farnworth, Kearsley, Moses Gate

1983–2024
- Seats: One
- Created from: Bolton East; Bolton West; Farnworth
- Replaced by: Bolton South and Walkden

Bolton South East was a constituency in the House of Commons (Note: A borough constituency (for the purposes of election expenses and type of returning officer)). (Note: As with all constituencies, the constituency elects one Member of Parliament (MP) by the first past the post system of election at least every five years.)

Further to the completion of the 2023 review of Westminster constituencies, the seat was subject to boundary changes which incorporated the community of Walkden in the City of Salford. As a consequence, it was replaced with the constituency of Bolton South and Walkden, which was first contested at the 2024 general election.

== Constituency profile ==
The seat covered the southern part of Bolton town and its suburbs around the M61 motorway. Towns such as Farnworth and Kearsley are former mining areas. Residents were generally poorer than the UK average, though the Hulton ward is more Conservative, and there were smaller villages and suburban areas such as Ringley, as well as green spaces such as the 750-acre Moses Gate Country Park.

== Boundaries ==
Map of boundaries 2010-2024

1983–2010: The Metropolitan Borough of Bolton wards of Burnden, Daubhill, Derby, Farnworth, Harper Green, Kearsley, and Little Lever.

2010–2024: The Metropolitan Borough of Bolton wards of Farnworth, Great Lever, Harper Green, Hulton, Kearsley, Little Lever and Darcy Lever, and Rumworth.

Following a boundary reorganization in the early 1980s, parts of the former constituencies of Bolton East and Farnworth were combined to create this constituency, with effect from the 1983 general election.

== Members of Parliament ==
Election	Member	Party
1983	David Young	Labour
1997	Dr Brian Iddon	Labour
2010	Yasmin Qureshi	Labour

== Elections ==
This area has elected Labour candidates to be MP since its creation in 1983, with majorities of more than 15%; therefore, until 2019, it could have been seen as a safe seat. Unlike the other two Bolton seats, it has remained safely Labour. This is also reflected by the majority of wards returning councillors for Labour; a notably stronger ward for the Conservative Party to date has been Hulton, which has often returned Conservative councillors.

=== Elections in the 2010s ===
General election 2019: Bolton South East
Party	Candidate	Votes	%	±%
Labour	Yasmin Qureshi	21,516	53.0	―7.7
Conservative	Johno Lee	13,918	34.3	+4.6
Brexit Party	Mark Cunningham	2,968	7.3	New
Liberal Democrats	Kev Walsh	1,411	3.5	+1.7
Green	David Figgins	791	1.9	+0.6
Majority		7,598	18.7	―12.3
Turnout		40,604	58.7	―2.7
Labour hold		Swing	-6.2	

General election 2017: Bolton South East
Party	Candidate	Votes	%	±%
Labour	Yasmin Qureshi	25,676	60.7	+10.2
Conservative	Sarah Pochin	12,550	29.7	+9.4
UKIP	Jeff Armstrong	2,779	6.6	―17.0
Liberal Democrats	Frank Harasiwka	781	1.8	―0.8
Green	Alan Johnson	537	1.3	―1.6
Majority		13,126	31.0	+4.1
Turnout		42,323	61.4	+2.9
Labour hold		Swing	+0.5	

General election 2015: Bolton South East
Party	Candidate	Votes	%	±%
Labour	Yasmin Qureshi	20,555	50.5	+3.1
UKIP	Jeff Armstrong	9,627	23.6	+19.7
Conservative	Mudasir Dean	8,289	20.3	―5.3
Green	Alan Johnson	1,200	2.9	+1.3
Liberal Democrats	Darren Reynolds	1,072	2.6	―13.3
Majority		10,928	26.9	+4.9
Turnout		40,743	58.5	+1.9
Labour hold		Swing		

General election 2010: Bolton South East
Party	Candidate	Votes	%	±%
Labour	Yasmin Qureshi	18,782	47.4	―8.3
Conservative	Andy Morgan	10,148	25.6	+2.9
Liberal Democrats	Donal O'Hanlon	6,289	15.9	―2.2
BNP	Sheila Spink	2,012	5.1	New
UKIP	Ian Sidaway	1,564	3.9	+1.4
Green	Alan Johnson	614	1.6	New
CPA	Navaid Syed	195	0.5	New
Majority		8,634	21.8	+11.2
Turnout		39,604	56.6	
Labour hold		Swing	―5.6	

=== Elections in the 2000s ===
General election 2005: Bolton South East
Party	Candidate	Votes	%	±%
Labour	Brian Iddon	18,129	56.9	―5.0
Conservative	Deborah Dunleavy	6,491	20.4	―3.8
Liberal Democrats	Frank Harasiwka	6,047	19.0	+7.5
UKIP	Florence Bates	840	2.6	New
Veritas	David Jones	343	1.1	New
Majority		11,638	36.5	―1.2
Turnout		31,850	50.0	―0.1
Labour hold		Swing	―0.6	

General election 2001: Bolton South East
Party	Candidate	Votes	%	±%
Labour	Brian Iddon	21,129	61.9	―7.0
Conservative	Haroon Rashid	8,258	24.2	+4.5
Liberal Democrats	Frank Harasiwka	3,941	11.5	+2.7
Socialist Labour	John Kelly	826	2.4	New
Majority		12,871	37.7	―11.5
Turnout		34,154	50.1	―15.1
Labour hold		Swing	―5.8	

=== Elections in the 1990s ===
General election 1997: Bolton South East
Party	Candidate	Votes	%	±%
Labour	Brian Iddon	29,856	68.9	+14.6
Conservative	Paul Carter	8,545	19.7	―9.0
Liberal Democrats	Frank Harasiwka	3,805	8.8	―1.8
Referendum	William Pickering	973	2.3	New
Natural Law	Lewis Walch	170	0.4	―0.2
Majority		21,311	49.2	+23.6
Turnout		43,349	65.2	―10.3
Labour hold		Swing	+11.8	

General election 1992: Bolton South East
Party	Candidate	Votes	%	±%
Labour	David Young	26,906	54.3	0.0
Conservative	Nicholas Wood-Dow	14,215	28.7	―2.5
Liberal Democrats	Dennis Lee	5,243	10.6	―3.9
Independent Labour	William Hardman	2,894	5.8	New
Natural Law	Lewis Walch	290	0.6	New
Majority		12,691	25.6	+2.5
Turnout		49,548	75.5	+0.6
Labour hold		Swing	+1.3	

=== Elections in the 1980s ===
General election 1987: Bolton South East
Party	Candidate	Votes	%	±%
Labour	David Young	26,791	54.3	+6.0
Conservative	Stanley Windle	15,410	31.2	+0.5
Liberal	Frank Harasiwka	7,161	14.5	―6.0
Majority		11,381	23.1	+5.5
Turnout		49,362	74.9	+1.3
Labour hold		Swing	+2.8	

General election 1983: Bolton South East
Party	Candidate	Votes	%	±%
Labour	David Young	23,984	48.3	
Conservative	John Walsh	15,231	30.7	
Liberal	Margaret Rothwell	10,157	20.5	
Independent	Tom Keen	296	0.6	
Majority		8,753	17.6	
Turnout		49,668	73.6	
Labour win (new seat)				

== See also ==
- List of parliamentary constituencies in Greater Manchester
