= Edwin Taylor (British politician) =

British master baker and politician

Edwin Taylor JP

Mayor of Bolton
- In office 1959–1960
- Preceded by: Elizabeth Ann Ashmore
- Succeeded by: James Gradwell

Member of Parliament for Bolton East
- In office 16 November 1960 – 15 October 1964
- Preceded by: Philip Bell
- Succeeded by: Robert Howarth

Personal details
- Born: 13 February 1905
- Died: 25 September 1973 (aged 68)
- Party: Conservative

Edwin Taylor, JP (13 February 1905 – 25 September 1973) was a British master baker and politician from Bolton.

== Bakery and career ==
Taylor was educated at St John's School, Wingates, and Bolton Technical College. He left school when he was 13 and later on (30), he went into the bakery business and eventually opened his own bakery and confectioners' shop in his home town; keen to promote the business, he founded the Bolton and District Master Bakers' Association of which he became Chairman and eventually President. He was known locally as "the pie-man", or sometimes "The Dancing Pieman" because of his proficiency as a ballroom dancing champion. During the Second World War, Taylor served in the Auxiliary Fire Service.

== Municipal service ==
In 1940 Taylor was co-opted onto Bolton Town Council as a Conservative for Tonge Ward (elections having been suspended due to the outbreak of war). He lost his seat in 1945 but regained it in 1947. In 1952 he was made a Justice of the Peace, and in 1955 he was elected as an Alderman of Bolton. He was chosen as Mayor of Bolton in 1959-60 and served as Deputy Mayor the following year.

== Byelection campaign ==
Philip Bell QC, the Conservative Member of Parliament for Bolton East, was appointed as a County Court Judge in the summer of 1960, which required a byelection to replace him. Taylor was chosen as the new candidate. The byelection saw the decision of the Liberal Party to field a candidate, which broke a local pact which had held for 10 years whereby the Liberals left the Bolton East seat alone, and in return the Conservatives did not stand in Bolton West; the pact had achieved its objective of preventing the Labour Party from winning either.

== Parliament ==
Taylor was elected by a margin of 641 votes over Labour candidate Robert Howarth, with the Liberal candidate Frank Byers securing a quarter of the vote. Dissension within the Labour Party over nuclear disarmament was thought to have helped Taylor win. On taking his seat, one Labour MP immediately recommended that Taylor should be put on the Kitchen Committee of the House of Commons.

In his first year in Parliament, Taylor was much concentrated on fire safety after a fire in a club in Bolton killed 19 people. In 1962 he tabled an amendment calling on limits on the importation of cloth and yarn to prevent dumping by foreign competitors. He also joined the 1964 rebellion against the abolition of resale price maintenance. At the 1964 general election, a more organised Labour campaign in Bolton East saw Taylor voted out by a margin of more than 3,000 votes (with the Liberals simultaneously losing Bolton West by roughly the same margin).

== Subsequent career ==
Taylor subsequently fought the 1966 general election attempting to regain his seat. In May 1973 he was elected to Greater Manchester County Council, but died four months later.

Parliament of the United Kingdom
Preceded by Philip Bell	Member of Parliament for Bolton East; 1960–1964	Succeeded by Robert Howarth
