= List of mayors of Bolton =

This is a list of the Mayors of Bolton in the north west of England. The office of Mayor is a ceremonial, non-political post. As the Borough's First Citizen, the Mayor serves as the civic representative at a wide range of functions and events throughout the local authority.

The Mayors of Bolton have represented three types of local government districts. The Mayors of the Municipal Borough of Bolton 1838–1889, the Mayors of the County Borough of Bolton 1889–1974, and the present Mayors of the Metropolitan Borough of Bolton since 1974.

There was also a transitional Mayor / Chairman in 1973–1974 who saw over the dissolution of the County Borough of Bolton and the foundation of the Metropolitan Borough of Bolton.

== Mayors of Bolton ==
=== Municipal Borough Mayors ===
No.	Mayor	Party	Tenure	Terms	Notes
1	Charles James Darbishire	Liberal	1838–1839	1	b.1797 – d.1874. The first Mayor of the Municipal Borough of Bolton.
2	Robert Heywood	Liberal	1839–1840	1	b.1786 – d.1868. Father of John Heywood, Mayor of Bolton 1903–05.
3	James Arrowsmith	Liberal	1840–1841	1	b.1791 – d.1870. Father of Peter Rothwell Arrowsmith, Mayor of Bolton 1853–55.
4	Thomas Cullen	Liberal	1841–1842	1	b.1782 – d.1859.
5	Robert Walsh	Liberal	1842–1843	1	b.1791 – d.1873.
6	Thomas Gregson	Liberal	1843–1844	1	b.1795 – d.1865.
7	John Slater	Liberal	1844–1845	1	b.1798 – d.1861.
8	Stephen Blair	Conservative	1845–1846	1	b.1804 – d.1870. Conservative MP for Bolton 1848–52.
9	James Scowcroft	Conservative	1846–1847	1	b.1788 – d.1865.
10	Thomas Ridgeway Bridson	Conservative	1847–1848	1	b.1795 – d.1863.
11	Thomas Lever Rushton	Conservative	1848–1850	2	b.1811 – d.1883.
12	William Gray	Conservative	1850–1852	2	b.1814 – d.1895. Conservative MP for Bolton 1857–1874.
13	John Stones	Conservative	1852–1853	1	b.c.1804 – d.1859.
14	Peter Rothwell Arrowsmith	Liberal	1853–1855	2	b.1816 – d.1890. Son of James Arrowsmith, Mayor of Bolton 1840–41.
15	James Knowles	Liberal	1855–1857	2	b.1813 – d.1886.
16	William Makant	Liberal	1857–1859	2	b.1807 – d.1880.
17	John Orton	Liberal	1859–1860	1	b.1804 – d.1870.
18	John Harwood	Liberal	1860–1861	1	b.1802 – d.1875. Brother of Richard Harwood, Mayor of Bolton 1863–64.
19	James Rawthorne Wolfenden	Liberal	1861–1863	2	b.1811 – d.1886. Brother of Charles Wolfenden, Mayor of Bolton 1875–77.
20	Richard Harwood	Liberal	1863–1864	1	b.1802 – d.1875. Brother of John Harwood, Mayor of Bolton 1860–61, and father of George Harwood, Liberal MP for Bolton 1895–1912.
21	Richard Stockdale	Liberal	1864–1866	2	b.1809 – d.1886.
22	Dr Fergus Ferguson	Liberal	1866–1867	1	b.1805 – d.1887.
23	James Barlow	Liberal	1867–1869	2	b.1821 – d.1887.
24	Thomas Walmsley	Conservative	1869–1871	2	b.1812 – d.1890.
25	William Walter Cannon	Conservative	1871–1873	2	b.1822 – d.1903. Brother in law of Richard Stockdale, Mayor of Bolton 1864–66.
26	Jeremiah Marsden	Conservative	1873–1875	2	b.1820 – d.1877.
27	Charles Wolfenden	Conservative	1875–1877	2	b.1826 – d.1884. Brother of James Rawthorne Wolfenden, Mayor of Bolton 1861–1863.
28	James Greenhalgh	Conservative	1877–1878	1	b.1822 – d.1881.
29	Peter Crook Marsden	Conservative	1878–1879	1	b.1838 – d.1913.
30	Henry Marriott Richardson	Conservative	1879–1880	1	b.c.1816 – d.1893.
31	Joseph Musgrave	Conservative	1880–1881	1	b.1812 – d.1891.
32	Thomas Glaister	Conservative	1881–1882	1	b.1829 – d.1891. Grandfather of Thomas Glaister, Mayor of Bolton 1949–48.
33	Ebenezer Green Harwood	Conservative	1882–1884	2	b.1833 – d.1902.
34	Thomas Fletcher	Conservative	1884–1887	3	b.1832 – d.1914.
35	Thomas Moscrop	Conservative	1887–1888	1	b.1811 – d.1889.
36	John Barrett	Conservative	1888–1889	1	b.1842 – d.1908.

=== County Borough Mayors ===
No.	Mayor	Party	Tenure	Terms	Notes
1	John Barrett	Conservative	1889–1890	1	b.1842 – d.1908. The first Mayor of the County Borough of Bolton.
2	Matthew Fielding	Conservative	1890–1891	1	b.1848 – d.1915.
3	William Nicholson	Conservative	1891–1894	3	b.1825 – d.1915.
4	Lt Col. Sir Benjamin Alfred Dobson	Conservative	1894–1898	4	b.1847 – d.1898. Knighted on the 21 July 1897. Died in office.
5	William Nicholson	Conservative	1898–1899	2	b.1825 – d.1915. Acted as caretaker Mayor in 1898, and re-elected the same year.
6	John Edwin Scowcroft	Conservative	1899–1901	2	b.1845 – d.1901. Died in office.
7	William Nicholson	Conservative	1901	1	b.1825 – d.1915. Acted again as caretaker Mayor in 1901.
8	John Miles	Conservative	1901–1903	2	b.1841 – d.1917.
9	John Heywood	Conservative	1903–1905	2	b.1849 – d.1910. Son of Robert Heywood, Mayor of Bolton 1839–40.
10	Colonel George Hesketh	Conservative	1905–1906	1	b.1853 – d.1930. Appointed High Sheriff of Lancashire in 1918.
11	Thomas Barlow Tong	Conservative	1906–1908	2	b.1850 – d.1917. Uncle of Walter Wharton Tong, Mayor of Bolton 1940–41.
12	William Henry Brown	Conservative	1908–1909	1	b.1850 – d.1931.
13	Joseph Tyas Cooper	Liberal	1909–1911	2	b.1852 – d.1929.
14	James Young	Conservative	1911–1913	2	b.1861 – d.1917.
15	John Turner Brooks	Conservative	1913–1914	1	b.1836 – d.1918.
16	James Seddon	Conservative	1914–1916	2	b.1856 – d.1923.
17	Sir Knowles Edge	Liberal	1916–1918	2	b.1854 – d.1931. Knighted on the 12 August 1919. Father of Sir William Edge, Liberal MP for Bolton 1916–23.
18	William Lever, 1st Viscount Leverhulme	Independent	1918–1919	1	b.1851 – d.1925. Created Baron Leverhulme in 1917, and Viscount Leverhulme in 1922. He is the only Mayor who was not a Councillor.
19	Robert Parkinson	Conservative	1919–1921	2	b.1862 – d.1936.
20	William Russell	Conservative	1921–1922	1	b.1859 – d.1937. Conservative MP for Bolton 1922–23.
21	Alfred Potts	Labour	1922–1923	1	b.1867 – d.1945.
22	Edmund Aspinall	Conservative	1923–1924	1	b.1858 – d.1940.
23	John Fletcher Steele	Liberal	1924–1925	1	b.1867 – d.1941.
24	Percy Knott	Conservative	1925–1926	1	b.1865 – d.1943.
25	Sir Thomas Evans Flitcroft	Liberal	1926–1928	2	b.1861 – d.1938. Knighted in the King's Birthday Honours list 1913.
26	Frank Cheadle	Labour	1928–1929	1	b.1885 – d.1940.
27	Robert Edwards Roberts	Conservative	1929–1930	1	b.1876 – d.1944.
28	Henry Warburton	Liberal	1930–1931	1	b.1865 – d.1936. Nephew of Thomas Warburton, founder of Warburtons the bakers.
29	George Sykes	Conservative	1931–1932	1	b.c.1874 – d.1958.
30	Samuel Lomax	Labour	1932–1933	1	b.1871 – d.1944.
31	Dr Ernest Monks	Conservative	1933–1934	1	b.1871 – d.1941. Father of Dr John Richard Monks, Mayor of Bolton 1970–71.
32	John Percy Taylor	Liberal	1934–1935	1	b.1868 – d.1945. Appointed High Sheriff of Lancashire in 1926.
33	Benjamin Kirkman	Labour	1935–1936	1	b.c.1864 – d.1953.
34	James Alfred Russell	Conservative	1936–1937	1	b.1873 – d.1948.
35	Thomas Halstead	Labour	1937–1938	1	
36	James Entwistle	Conservative	1938–1939	1	
37	Charles Harold Beswick	Liberal	1939–1940	1	b.1874 – d.1945.
38	Walter Wharton Tong	Conservative	1940–1941	1	b.1890 – d.1978. Nephew of Thomas Barlow Tong, Mayor of Bolton 1906–08. Knighted on the 11 February 1955.
39	Alfred Booth	Labour	1941–1942	1	b.1893 – d.1965. Labour MP for Bolton East 1950–1951.
40	James Bleakley	Conservative	1942–1943	1	b.1893 – d.1993.
41	Fred Bentley	Liberal	1943–1944	1	
42	Walter Bradley	Conservative	1944–1945	1	
43	Robert Demaine	Labour	1945–1946	1	b.1874 – d.1948.
44	Dr Horace Wilfred Taylor	Conservative	1946–1947	1	
45	John Henry Hampson	Labour	1947–1949	2	
46	Thomas Glaister	Conservative	1949–1950	1	b.1886 – d.1974. Grandson of Thomas Glaister, Mayor of Bolton 1881–82, and brother-in-law of William Wharton Tong, Mayor of Bolton 1940–41.
47	Helen Wright	Labour	1950–1951	1	b.1892 – d.1970. The first female Mayor of Bolton.
48	Thomas Parry Dunning	Conservative	1951–1952	1	b.1893 – d.1973.
49	James Vickers	Labour	1952–1953	1	b.1895 – d.1972.
50	James Parkes,	Conservative	1953–1954	1	b.1893 – d.1980.
51	Peter Flanagan	Labour	1954–1955	1	b.1887 – d.1964.
52	Stanley Entwistle	Conservative	1955–1956	1	died 1978.
53	Peter Lowe	Labour	1956–1957	1	b.1904 – d.1986.
54	Frank Young	Conservative	1957–1958	1	b.1904 – d.1977.
55	Elizabeth Ann Ashmore	Labour	1958–1959	1	b.1895 – d.1972.
56	Edwin Taylor	Conservative	1959–1960	1	b.1905 – d.1973. Conservative MP for Bolton East 1960–64.
57	James Gradwell	Labour	1960–1961	1	b.1891 – d.1972.
58	William Harold Bateson	Conservative	1961–1962	1	b.1897 – d.1967.
59	John Arthur Childs	Labour	1962–1963	1	b.1899 – d.1965.
60	Thomas Connor	Liberal	1963–1964	1	
61	Harry Wood	Conservative	1964–1965	1	
62	Charles Henry Lucas	Labour	1965–1966	1	Awarded a CBE in 1970.
63	Nora Vickers	Conservative	1966–1967	1	
64	Clarence Leat	Labour	1967–1968	1	b.1892 – d.1973.
65	Ethel Maisie Ryley	Conservative	1968–1969	1	
66	Herbert Glynn	Labour	1969–1970	1	b.1908 – d.1995.
67	Dr John Richard Monks	Conservative	1970–1971	1	b.1911 – d.1985. Son of Dr Ernest Monks, Mayor of Bolton 1933–34.
68	Arnold Townend	Labour	1971–1972	1	
69	Alan Ellis Clarke	Labour	1972–1973	1	b.1931. Triplet brother of Donald Stewart Clarke, Mayor of Bolton 1977–78.
70	Henry Devenish	Labour	1973–1974	1	b.1926 – d.2010.

=== Transitional Mayor ===
No.	Mayor	Party	Tenure	Terms	Notes
1	John Collins Hanscomb	Conservative	1973–1974	1	Councillor for Deane cum Heaton Ward. Chairman (1973–1974) and Transitional Mayor (1974) during the dissolution of the County Borough and the foundation of the Metropolitan Borough.

=== Metropolitan Borough Mayors ===
No.	Mayor	Party	Tenure	Terms	Notes
1	Doris Berry	Conservative	1974–1975	1	b.1912 – d.1992. The first Mayor of the Metropolitan Borough of Bolton.
2	John Arthur Foster	Labour	1975–1976	1	b.1927 – d.2010.
3	James Rigby	Conservative	1976–1977	1	b.1918 – d.1998.
4	Donald Stewart Clarke	Labour	1977–1978	1	b.1931 – d.2005. Triplet brother of Alan Ellis Clarke, Mayor of Bolton 1972–73.
5	Adam Hibbert	Conservative	1978–1979	1	b.1910 – d.1992.
6	Elizabeth Olwen Hamer	Labour	1979–1980	1	b.1928 – d.1995.
7	James Smith	Conservative	1980–1981	1	b.1912 – d.1994.
8	Joseph Wild	Labour	1981–1982	1	b.1916 – d.1994.
9	John Collins Hanscomb	Conservative	1982–1983	1	Councillor for Deane cum Heaton Ward b.1924 – d.2019. Previously Chairman / Transitional Mayor 1973–74. Appointed a CBE in December 1980.
10	Alan Samuel Brigg	Labour	1983–1984	1	b.1911 – d.1988.
11	Barbara Annette Hurst	Conservative	1984–1985	1	b.1919 – d.2001. Awarded an MBE in 1993.
12	William Hardman	Labour	1985–1986	1	b.1939 – d.1999.
13	Arthur Poulsom	Conservative	1986–1987	1	b.1913 – d.1988.
14	William Arthur Robinson	Labour	1987–1988	1	b.1923 – d.1990.
15	Brian Melvyn Allanson	Conservative	1988–1989	1	b.1927.
16	Kenneth MacIvor	Labour	1989–1990	1	b.1925 – d.2004.
17	Geoffrey Smith	Conservative	1990–1991	1	b.1945.
18	Gerald Riley	Labour	1991–1992	1	b.1929.
19	Ernest Crook	Conservative	1992–1993	1	b.1927.
20	Campbell Jocelyn H Benjamin	Labour	1993–1994	1	b.1914 – d.2004. The first black Mayor of Bolton. Appointed an OBE in 1996.
21	Thomas Anderton	Labour	1994–1995	1	Councillor for Daubhill Ward b.1924.
22	Frank Alan Rushton	Conservative	1995–1996	1	Councillor for Deane cum Heaton Ward and later for Heaton and Lostock Ward b.1934.
23	Eric Johnson	Labour	1996–1997	1	b.1923. Also was Mayor of Blackrod 1988–89 and 1993–94.
24	Peter Gareth Birch	Labour	1997–1998	1	b.1948 – d.2001.
25	Peter Louis Finch	Labour	1998–1999	1	Councillor for Westhoughton Ward b.1937. Also was Mayor of Westhoughton 1986–87.
26	John Monaghan	Labour	1999–2000	1	Councillor for Blackrod Ward b.1936 – d.2008. Also was Mayor of Blackrod 1992–93 and 1997–98.
27	Alan Wilkinson	Conservative	2000–2001	1	Councillor for Bromley Cross Ward b.1948.
28	Kevan James Helsby	Labour	2001–2002	1	Councillor for Horwich Ward b.1950. Received an MBE in the Millennium honours list. Also was Mayor of Horwich 1987–88 and 2004–05.
29	John Walsh	Conservative	2002–2003	1	Councillor for Astley Bridge Ward b.1952. Appointed an OBE in 1994.
30	Clifford Morris	Labour	2003–2004	1	Councillor for Halliwell Ward.
31	Prentice Howarth	Labour	2004–2005	1	Councillor for Great Lever Ward b.1936.
32	Frank Richard White	Labour	2005–2006	1	Councillor for Tonge with the Haulgh Ward b.1940. Labour MP for Bury and Radcliffe 1979–1983.
33	Walter Hall	Conservative	2006–2007	1	Councillor for Bradshaw Ward b.1935.
34	Barbara Olwyn Ronson	Liberal Democrats	2007–2008	1	Councillor for Horwich North East Ward b.1942. Also was Mayor of Horwich 1996–97.
35	Anthony Connell	Labour	2008–2009	1	Councillor for Little Lever and Darcy Lever Ward b.1941.
36	Norman Critchley	Conservative	2009–2010	1	Councillor for Bromley Cross Ward b.1938.
37	John Byrne	Labour	2010–2011	1	Councillor for Breightmet Ward.
38	Anthony Noel Spencer	Labour	2011–2012	1	Councillor for Farnworth Ward.
39	Guy Harkin	Labour	2012–2013	1	Councillor for Crompton Ward.
40	Colin Shaw	Conservative	2013–2014	1	Councillor for Heaton and Lostock Ward.
41	Martin Donaghy	Labour	2014–2015	1	Councillor for Tonge with the Haulgh Ward.
42	Carole Swarbrick	Liberal Democrats	2015–2016	1	Councillor for Smithills Ward.
43	Lynda Byrne	Labour	2016–2017	1	Councillor for Breightmet Ward.
44	Roger Hayes	Liberal Democrats	2017–2018	1	Councillor for Smithills Ward.
45	Elaine Sherrington	Labour	2018–2019	1	Councillor for Tonge with the Haulgh Ward.
46	Hilary Fairclough	Conservative	2019–2020	1	Councillor for Astley Bridge Ward.
47	Linda Thomas	Labour	2020–2022	2	Councillor for Halliwell Ward. Served a two-year term of office due to the COVID-19 pandemic. Also was Mayor of Westhoughton 1995–96.
48	Akhtar Zaman	Labour	2022–2023	1	Councillor for Halliwell Ward. The first Asian and Muslim Mayor of Bolton.
49	Mohammed Ayub	Labour	2023–2024	1	Councillor for Great Lever Ward.
50	Andrew Morgan	Conservative	2024–2025	1	Councillor for Heaton, Lostock & Chew Moor Ward.
51	David Chadwick	Labour	2025–2026	1	Councillor for Westhoughton South Ward.
