= Brian Iddon =

British politician

Member of Parliament for Bolton South East
- In office 1 May 1997 – 12 April 2010
- Preceded by: David Young
- Succeeded by: Yasmin Qureshi

Personal details
- Born: 5 July 1940 (age 86) Tarleton, Lancashire
- Party: Labour
- Spouse(s): Merrilyn Muncaster, Eileen Harrison
- Education: University of Hull

Brian Iddon (born 5 July 1940) is a British organic chemist and Labour Party politician, who was the Member of Parliament (MP) for Bolton South East from 1997 to 2010.

== Early life ==
Born in Tarleton, Lancashire and attended the village's Church of England Primary School, Christ Church Boys' School, Southport and the Southport Technical College (now Southport College). He went on to study at the University of Hull where he was awarded a BSc degree in Chemistry in 1961 and a PhD in organic chemistry in 1964. Later in 1981, he was awarded a DSc for his work in Heterocyclic Organic Chemistry.

He joined the staff of Durham University as a temporary organic chemistry lecturer in 1964 before becoming a demonstrator in organic chemistry in 1965. In 1966, he became an organic chemistry lecturer at the University of Salford until he became a senior lecturer at the university in 1978. In 1986, he became a reader and left the university on his election to the House of Commons in 1997.

== Parliamentary career ==
From 1976 until 1998 he served on the Bolton Borough Council. He was first returned to Parliament in the 1997 election as the MP for Bolton South East following the retirement of David Young. He served on the Environmental Audit United Kingdom from 1997 until 2001, was a member of the science and technology committee 2000–07 and a member of the Innovation, Universities, Science and Skills committee since 2007. He also known as a campaigner for the legalisation of cannabis. In October 2006, he announced that he would not seek re-election at the next general election.

== Personal life ==
He married Merrilyn Muncaster in 1965 in Leeds and they had two daughters before they divorced in 1989. In 1995 he later married Eileen Harrison, and he has two step sons. In 2009, Iddon was appointed an Honorary Fellow of the Institution of Chemical Engineers (IChemE) in recognition of his long-standing support of the chemistry using industries.

== Bibliography ==
- Opinion: Government seeks more impact from its research investment by B Iddon, Future Medicinal Chemistry, June 2009, Volume 1, Number 3 (http://www.future-science.com/doi/pdf/10.4155/fmc.09.44)
- Radiation Chemistry of Aqueous Solutions of Indole and its Derivatives by B Iddon, GO Phillips, KE Robbins, JV Davies (University of Salford, 1971)
- Radiation Sterilization of Pharmaceuticals and Biomedical Products by R Blackburn, B Iddon, JS Moore, GO Phillips, DM Power, TW Woodward (International Atomic Energy Agency, Vienna, 1975)
- The Magic of Chemistry by Brian Iddon (BDH, 1985) ISBN 0-9500439-6-6
- Bromine Compounds: Chemistry and Applications Edited by D.Price, B. Iddon and B.J. Wakefield (Elsevier, 1998) ISBN 0-444-42982-4
- What Is Science Education For? By David Perks, R Sykes, M Reiss, S Singh, Mary Warnock. A Hunt, E Forster, B Iddon, H Teare, G Lawless and Tony Gilland (Academy of Ideas Ltd, 2006) ISBN 1-904025-05-6
