= Civil Service Islamic Society =

British voluntary society

- Abbreviation: CSIS
- Formation: February 2005
- Type: Non-political, voluntary, civil service
- Purpose: Islamic opinion, Interfaith dialogue
- Region served: United Kingdom
- President: Azad Ali
- Ambassador: Gus O'Donnell
- Website: www.csislamicsociety.wordpress.com

Civil Service Islamic Society (CSIS) is a British non-political, voluntary society, representative of mainstream Islamic opinion.

== Premise ==
The Civil Service Islamic Society was launched in February 2005. It is a non-political, voluntary society, representative of mainstream Islamic opinion in central government, it is based in the United Kingdom.

The organisation aims to build on common shared inter-faith values for the benefit of the Civil Service. The mission is to raise awareness of Islam, influence areas of interests and empower its Muslim staff by acting as a representative body of mainstream Islamic affairs.

The patron and ambassador of the organisation is Gus O'Donnell and the president of the organisation is Azad Ali.
