= New Conservative Party (UK) =

Minor party of early 1960s

- Founder: John E. Dayton
- Founded: March 1960
- Dissolved: Autumn 1961
- Ideology: British Nationalism

The New Conservative Party was a minor nationalist political party in the United Kingdom.

The party was founded in March 1960 by John E. Dayton, a civil engineer living in Dorking, Surrey. He described it as a party "neither of the extreme right nor left", although The History of British Political Parties describes its main policy as British nationalism.

Dayton stood as a candidate first in the 1960 Harrow West by-election, at which he took 4.7% of the vote – which proved to be the party's highest ever share. Following this, he launched a party newsletter, Watching Brief, and then in November stood in the Bolton East by-election. He took only 1.2% of the vote in Bolton East, while fellow party member C. F. H. Gilliard fared even worse in the 1960 Mid Bedfordshire by-election, with 0.6% of the votes cast.

In May 1961, the party was renamed as the True Conservative Party, but this change did not revive its fortunes, and it was dissolved in the autumn. However, Dayton founded the Patriotic Front for Political Action and stood in the 1961 Oswestry by-election, at which he took a 2.8% share. He soon ceased publishing Watching Brief, and dissolved the new party in February 1962, joining the Labour Party, and standing for the party in Westmorland at the 1966 general election.
