= John Hanscomb =

British politician (1924–2019)

John Hanscomb C.B.E., M.A.

Mayor of Bolton
- In office 1982–1983
- Preceded by: Joseph Wild
- Succeeded by: Alan Samuel Brigg

Leader of Bolton Council
- In office 1973–1980
- Succeeded by: Robert Howarth

Chairman and Transitional Mayor of Bolton
- In office 1973–1974

Personal details
- Born: John Collins Hanscomb; 7 October 1924 Bolton, England, UK
- Died: 14 February 2019 (aged 94)
- Party: Conservative
- Spouse(s): (1) Joan Ryder (2) Norma Gibbons

John Collins Hanscomb CBE (7 October 1924 – 14 February 2019) was a British Conservative politician from the Metropolitan Borough of Bolton in Greater Manchester, England.

== Early life and family ==
Born in Bolton, he was educated at Bolton School, and Oundle School near Peterborough. After leaving school he served as a fighter pilot in the Royal Air Force until 1953. He graduated from Emmanuel College, Cambridge with an M.A. degree in modern languages. He married twice, firstly Joan Ryder at Christ Church, Heaton in 1950, and secondly Norma Gibbons at Bolton Register Office in 1976. His son, Dr Nicholas Hanscomb, a scientist who helped to develop DNA testing, was murdered after attending Notting Hill Carnival in 1991, aged 38.

== Political career ==
Hanscomb was first elected as a Councillor for the Heaton Ward in the County Borough of Bolton in 1964. He became the Leader of the Conservative group and the Council Leader in 1972.

Following the provisions of the Local Government Act 1972, the County Borough was amalgamated with other local authorities to form the Metropolitan Borough of Bolton and Hanscomb became a Councillor for the Deane-cum-Heaton Ward. At the same time, he became the chairman of the new local authority in 1973 and transitional Mayor of Bolton the following year.

After the 1980 local elections, he resigned as the Leader of Bolton Council, but continued as the Leader of the Conservative group. He was awarded a Commander of the Order of the British Empire (C.B.E.) in December 1980. In 1982, he became the ceremonial Mayor of Bolton, with his wife, Norma, as Mayoress.

He stood down as Leader of the Conservative group in 1994, and retired as Councillor for the Deane-cum-Heaton Ward when boundary changes took place in 2004. Hanscomb died in February 2019 at the age of 94.
