= Robert Howarth =

British politician (1927–2021)

Leader of Bolton Council
- In office 1980–2004
- Preceded by: John Hanscomb
- Succeeded by: Barbara Ronson

Member of Parliament for Bolton East
- In office 15 October 1964 – 29 May 1970
- Preceded by: Edwin Taylor
- Succeeded by: Laurance Reed

Personal details
- Born: Robert Lever Howarth; 31 July 1927 Bolton, England
- Died: 2 April 2021 (aged 93)
- Party: Labour
- Spouse: Josephine Mary Doyle
- Children: 2

Robert Lever Howarth (31 July 1927 – 2 April 2021) was a British politician from Bolton who was a Member of Parliament (MP) for Bolton East from 1964 to 1970.

== Early life and career ==
Howarth was born in July 1927, the son of James Howarth and Bessie (née Pearson). He attended Bolton County Grammar School and then went to Bolton Technical College, where he trained as a draughtsman. He joined the Amalgamated Engineering Union in 1943 and the Labour Party in 1945. The following year, he became a member of the trade union Draughtsmen and Allied Technicians Union (DATA). He was a draughtsman with Hawker Siddeley Dynamics.

== Local government ==
Popular within the local party, Howarth was elected President of Bolton Labour Party. He was made a School and Technical College Governor in 1955 and served on Bolton Town Council from 1958 to 1960, being Vice-Chairman of the Housing Committee. He was the Labour candidate for the Conservative-held seat of Bolton East at the 1960 by-election, but lost by 641 votes. However, he was reselected to fight the following general election. In 1963 he was again elected to Bolton Town Council, serving until 1966 and becoming Vice-Chairman of the Planning Committee.

== Parliament ==
Howarth won the Bolton East constituency at the 1964 general election, gaining the seat for Labour from the Conservatives, in an election which saw his party return to power nationally. He was re-elected in 1966. Howarth did not rebel against the Labour Party whip, but was not appointed to government. He was Chairman of the Parliamentary Labour Party Aviation Committee.

== After Parliament ==
At the 1970 general election, Howarth unexpectedly lost his seat by 471 votes. He became a Lecturer in Liberal Studies at Leigh Technical College that year, remaining in the post until 1976. From 1977 to 1987, when he retired, Howarth was Senior Lecturer in General Studies at Wigan College of Technology. He did not stand for Parliament again, although his old seat was again gained by Labour at the subsequent general election in February 1974.

Howarth remained involved in local politics in Bolton, and was elected to Bolton Metropolitan Borough Council in 1973 for Ward No. 7 (West). He was re-elected to this Ward in 1978, before standing for the Central Ward in 1980, where he was comfortably elected and remained a councillor for the rest of his tenure on the borough. Howarth was Leader of the Labour Group from 1975 to 2004, and Leader of the Council from 1980 to 2004. In the 2004 election, following boundary changes, Howarth was selected for the new Crompton Ward, but along with the other Labour candidates in the Ward, he was defeated by the Liberal Democrats.

Howarth was Deputy Chairman of Manchester Airport from 1986 to 1987, becoming Chairman from 1987 to 1988, and again from 2002 to 2003. In 2001, Howarth was made a Freeman of Bolton Metropolitan Borough Council, and in 2004, he was made an Honorary Alderman of the Borough.

== Personal life and death ==
In 1952, Howard married Josephine Mary Doyle; the couple had a son and daughter. He listed his recreations in Who's Who as "gardening, reading, walking, films".

Howarth died in April 2021 at the age of 93, after suffering from dementia.

== Sources ==
- M. Stenton and S. Lees, Who's Who of British MPs (Harvester Press, 1981)
- Famous Boltonians

Parliament of the United Kingdom
Preceded by Edwin Taylor	Member of Parliament for Bolton East; 1964–1970	Succeeded by Laurance Reed
