= Sharples, Greater Manchester =

Coordinates: 53°35′57″N 2°25′59″W

Sharples
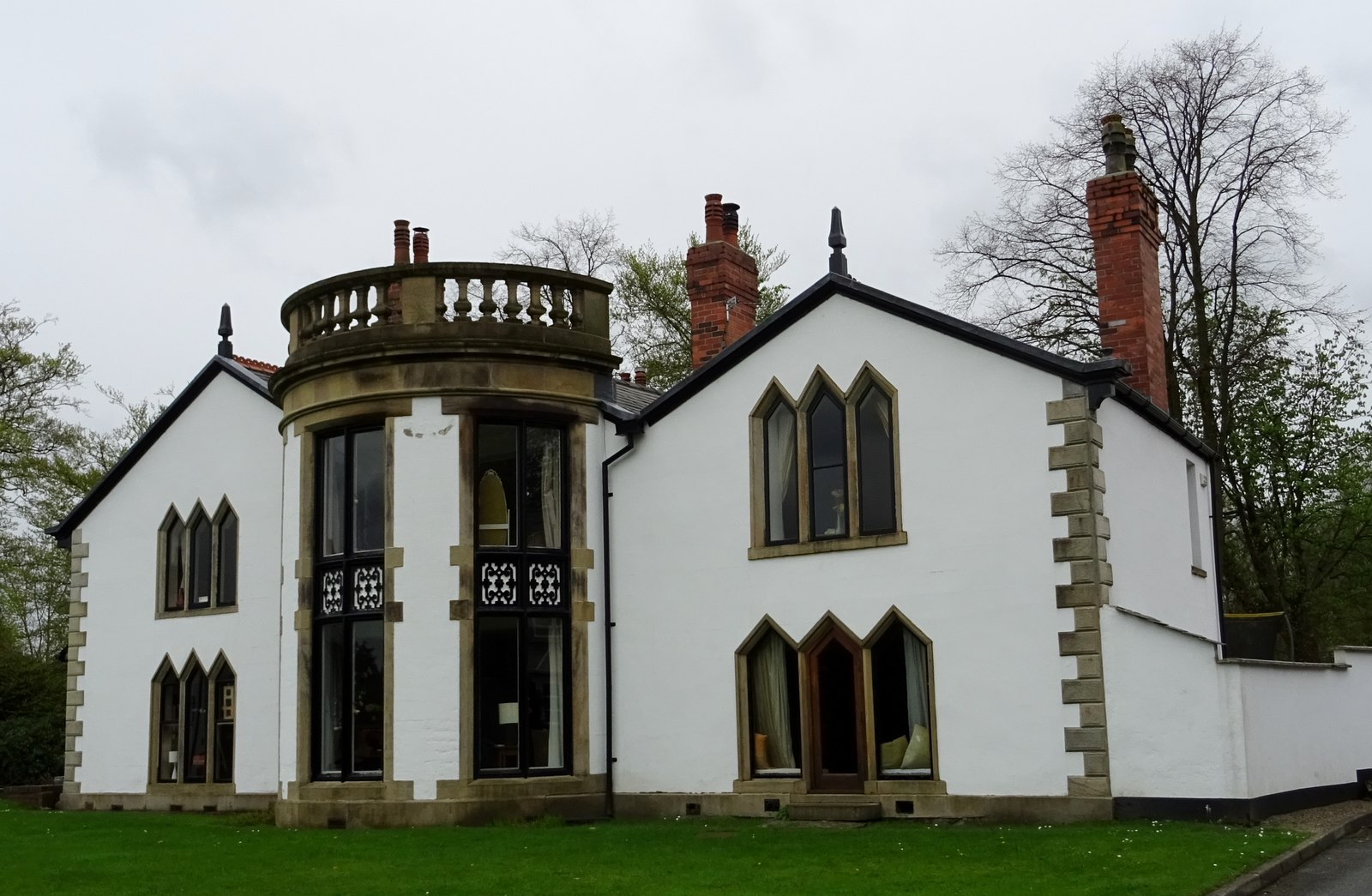
- Bosco House

- Location within Greater Manchester
- Metropolitan borough: Bolton
- Metropolitan county: Greater Manchester
- Region: North West
- Country: England
- Sovereign state: United Kingdom
- Police: Greater Manchester
- Fire: Greater Manchester
- Ambulance: North West

Sharples is a suburb of Bolton, in the county of Greater Manchester, England. It was a township of the civil and ecclesiastical parish of Bolton le Moors in the Salford hundred of Lancashire, England. It lay 2 1/2 miles north of Bolton. It contained the smaller settlements of Banktop, Sweet-Loves, High-Houses, Gale, Folds, Belmont, Piccadilly, Water-Meetings, Old Houses and part of Astley Bridge.

== History ==
Sharples was recorded in documents as Charples in 1212, Sharples and Scharples in 1292 and the manor was part of the Barony or Lordship of Manchester in the Middle Ages and was separated and then further divided into shares by subinfeudation. Sharples was the name of a local family who lived at Sharples Hall, the Lawson family owned the Hall at the time that the manor became partitioned after the death of Dr John Sharples Lawson who died in 1816. The next family to live and own the hall were the Rothwells.

Sharples contained forty-three hearths liable to the hearth tax in 1666. During the Industrial Revolution coal was mined on a small scale and cotton mills, calico print-works, extensive bleach-works were built in Belmont and Astley Bridge.

Malcolm Howe of Chelsea, a native of Sharples and published historian, with expertise in heraldry, had purchased manorial rights through an intermediary acting on behalf of the descendants of the owner as an historic relic to preserve its existence and keep the rights within the borough, at a cost of £15,000 in 2006. At the same time designing a heraldic badge for Sharples. In the same year he gifted the rights to Bolton Council whilst retaining rights to continue the use of the title of Lord of Sharples.

== Governance ==
Sharples
- Township / Civil parish
- History
  - Created: Middle Ages
  - Abolished: 1898
- Status: Township (until 1866); Civil parish (1866–1898)

Historically, Sharples formed part of the Hundred of Salford, a judicial division of southwest Lancashire, whilst administered from St Peter's Church, at Great Bolton. Under provisions of the Poor Relief Act 1662, townships replaced parishes as the main units of local administration in Lancashire. Sharples became one of the eighteen autonomous townships of the parish of Bolton le Moors. In 1837, Sharples became part of the Bolton Poor Law Union, which took over the responsibility for the administration and funding of the Poor Law in that area.

In 1864 Lower Sharples and part of Little Bolton became Astley Bridge Local Board of Health, in 1866 Sharples became a civil parish, in 1894 the parish was abolished to form Astley Bridge, part also went to Belmont. Sharples became part of Astley Bridge Urban District before being merged with the County Borough of Bolton in 1898. In 1891 the parish had a population of 6981. Upper Sharples became Belmont civil parish in the Bolton Rural District from 1894 to 1898 when it became part of Turton Urban District and in 1974 became part of Blackburn District in Lancashire.

== Geography ==
The township, on ground rising to the north of Bolton, had an area of 3920 acres divided into two portions. Upper Sharples on the slopes of Winter Hill and Whimberry Hill contained the districts of Hordern, Belmont, and the hamlet of Bromiley and a reservoir built by Bolton Waterworks formed the boundary between Sharples and Longworth. Lower Sharples was separated from the upper portion by a detached portion of Little Bolton. Astley Bridge is in Lower Sharples. The old road over the West Pennine Moors from Bolton to Preston via Astley Bridge and Withnell, now the A675 passed through the township for five miles. Much of the land is high moorland.

== Education ==
The main secondary school serving the area is Sharples School, located on Hill Cot Road.

== Religion ==
St Peter's church in Belmont was built in 1850.
