= Astley Bridge =

District of Bolton, Greater Manchester, England

Coordinates: 53.608274°N 2.432214°W

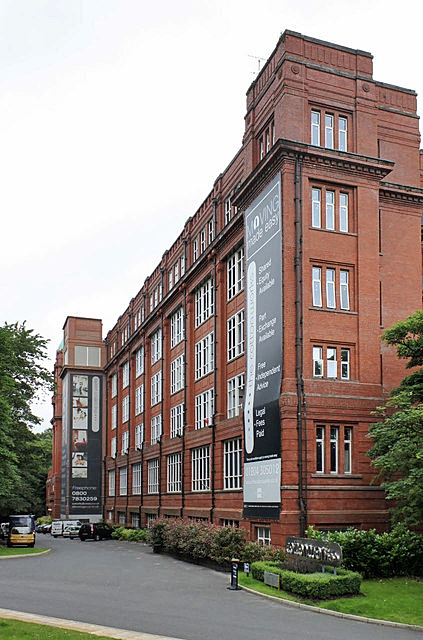
- Holden's Mill

- Location within Greater Manchester
- OS grid reference: SD7112
  - London: 225.9 mi (363.6 km) SSE
- Metropolitan borough: Bolton
- Metropolitan county: Greater Manchester
- Region: North West
- Country: England
- Sovereign state: United Kingdom
- Post town: BOLTON
- Postcode district: BL1
- Dialling code: 01204
- Police: Greater Manchester
- Fire: Greater Manchester
- Ambulance: North West
- UK Parliament: Bolton North East

Astley Bridge is predominantly a residential district of Bolton in Greater Manchester, England. It is 2.5 miles (4 km) north of Bolton town centre, 11.7 miles (19 km) south of Blackburn, and 14.3 miles (23 km) northwest of Manchester.

== History ==
Astley Bridge is quite a modern place name and only came into general use during the second half of the 19th century. It now refers to the large district in the modern Metropolitan Borough of Bolton, but prior to then it simply meant the bridge over Astley Brook which ran through the lower end of the township of Sharples.

Astley Bridge was formerly a chapelry in the parish of Bolton-le-Moors. A local board of health for Astley Bridge was constituted in 1864. The district comprised the higher (or detached) portion of Little Bolton and the lower portion of Sharples. After the Public Health Act 1875 was passed by Parliament in that year, Astley Bridge Local Board of Health assumed extra duties as an urban sanitary district, although the local board's title did not change. Following the implementation of the Local Government Act 1894, Astley Bridge Local Board was replaced by an elected urban district council in January 1895. In 1894 Astley Bridge became a civil parish, being formed from the part of the parish of Sharples in Astley Bridge Urban District, on 30 September 1898 the parish was abolished and merged with Bolton. The urban district was dissolved under the Bolton Turton and Westhoughton Extension Act 1898 (61 & 62 Vict. c. ccxlii) and its powers vested in Bolton County Borough Council.

== Governance ==
Since 1974, Astley Bridge has been part of the Metropolitan Borough of Bolton and gives its name to one of Bolton Council's electoral wards, the Astley Bridge ward which includes the Sharples, Bank Top, Eagley Bank, and Horrocks Fold areas. It is represented in Bolton Town Hall by three councillors. The ward is also part of the Bolton North East constituency which has been represented in the House of Commons by the Conservative Party MP Mark Logan since 2019.

== Education ==
There are five schools in Astley Bridge: St Paul's C.E. Primary School for pupils aged 2–11, Holy Infant and St Anthony RC Primary School, The Oaks Primary School and High Lawn Primary School, for pupils aged 5–11, and Thornleigh Salesian College for pupils aged 11–18.

== Sport ==
An association football club from the town, simply called Astley Bridge F.C., played in the FA Cup in the 1880s, reaching the second round on occasion. In 1882, the Bridgeites provided the first opposition to Burnley F.C. in competitive football, in the first round of the Lancashire Senior Cup, and handing out an 8–0 thrashing.

== Religion sites ==
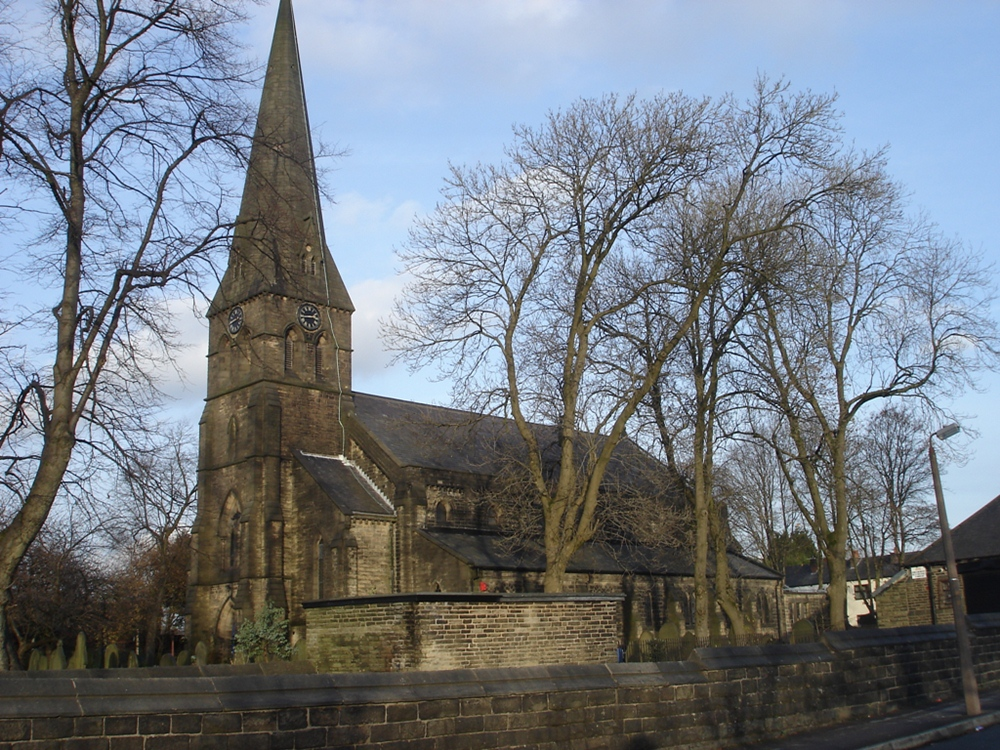
St Paul's Church, Astley Bridge.

Astley Bridge has a number of religious places of worship:

- St Paul's Church (CE), Holland Street, Astley Bridge.
- Holy Infant and St Anthony Church (RC), Baxendale Street, Astley Bridge.
- Astley Bridge Baptist Church, Eden Street, Astley Bridge.
- Astley Bridge Methodist, Seymour Road, Astley Bridge.
- Bank Top United Reformed Church, Ashworth Lane, Astley Bridge.
- Gospel Hall, Maxwell Street, Astley Bridge.
- Lee Clough Mission, Old Road, Astley Bridge.
