= Doffcocker =

Coordinates: 53.5915°N 2.4697°W

Doffcocker is a mostly residential district of Bolton, Greater Manchester, lying about 3½ miles from the town centre on the northwest edge of the suburbs on the lower south facing slopes of the West Pennine Moors. Historically within Lancashire, it is bounded by Markland Hill and Heaton to the south and Halliwell to the east.

Coal was mined at Doffcocker Colliery in the 19th century from the thin Mountain Mine (seam) of the lower coal measures.

Its most prominent feature is Doffcocker Lodge, a former mill lodge (created in 1874) and now a local nature reserve for wildfowl.

The history of the name is not certain but it is believed to be formed from the Celtic dubh meaning dark or black, and cocr meaning a winding stream, giving "dark winding stream", the stream that fed Doffcocker Lodge. Another version is that it was named after a Scotsman who was passing through the area and had to cross the stream. Its waters were exceptionally high following heavy rain, so to keep his stockings (cockers, as they were known in Scotland) dry the man was obliged to "doff" them.

A similar version appears in an old book

COCKERS, or COGGERS, properly half-boots made of untanned leather, or other stiff materials, and strapped under the shoe; but old stockings without feet, used as gaiters by hedgers and ploughmen, are often so called. Cockers occurs in Bishop Hall's Satires. In Lancashire the word is often used for stockings. There is a small place not far from Bolton, called Doff-Cocker, where, my friend, Mr. Turner, informs me, it used to be the fashion for the country people who came from church or market to pull off their stockings and walk barefoot home.
