= Little Bolton Town Hall =

Municipal building in Little Bolton, Greater Manchester, England

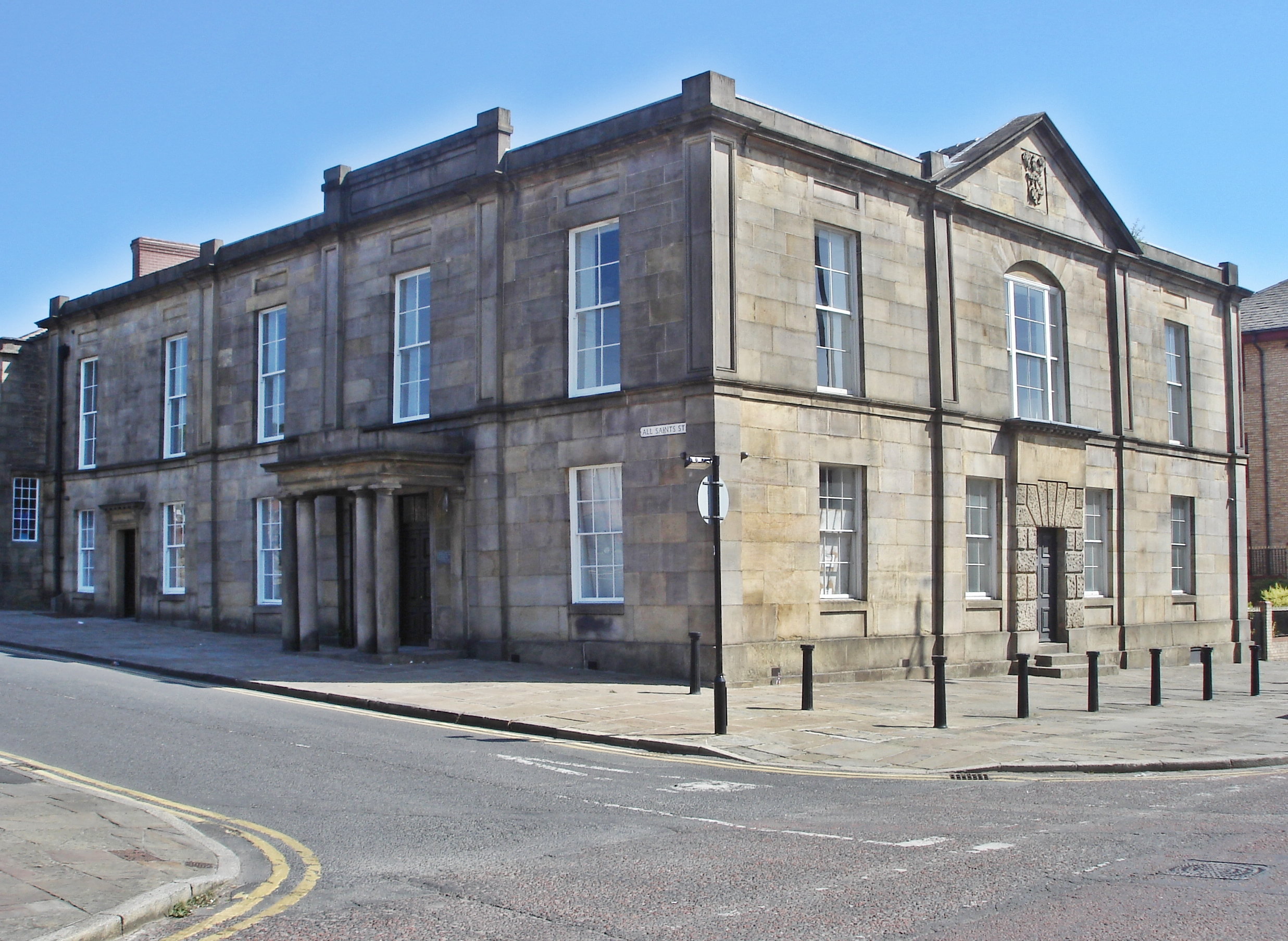
- Little Bolton Town Hall

- Shown in Greater Manchester
- 53.5826°N 2.4276°W
- Location: All Saints Street, Little Bolton

History
- Built: 1828

Site notes
- Architect: John Thompson
- Architectural style: Neoclassical style

Listed Building – Grade II
- Official name: Town Hall
- Designated: 26 April 1974
- Reference no.: 1388257

Little Bolton Town Hall is a municipal building in All Saints Street, Little Bolton, Greater Manchester, England. The structure, which was the meeting place of the trustees of Little Bolton, is a Grade II listed building.

== History ==
The town hall was commissioned by the trustees of the former township of Little Bolton which sat on the north bank of the River Croal; the trustees included Richard Ainsworth, the proprietor of Halliwell Bleachworks, who had assembled much of the land for the building and who donated the site. The new building was designed by John Thompson of Blackburn in the neoclassical style, built by a local contractor, Thomas Heaton, at a cost of £3,000 in ashlar stone and was officially opened on 7 February 1828. The original design involved a symmetrical main frontage with three bays facing onto St George's Street; the central bay, which slightly projected forward, featured a doorway on the ground floor with a rusticated surround and a modillioned cornice; there was a segmental sash window on the first floor flanked by pilasters supporting a pediment with a coat of arms of the lord of the manor, Thomas Tipping, in the tympanum. The building originally extended for just three bays up All Saints Street. Internally, the principal room was the courtroom; there were prison cells for petty criminals in the basement.

Although Little Bolton was absorbed into the new municipal borough of Bolton in 1838, the building became the regular meeting place of Bolton Corporation. In August 1839, Bolton's first mayor, Charles James Darbishire, accompanied a company of soldiers from the 96th Regiment of Foot, on their way to the town hall to rescue 23 special constables, who were besieged by Chartist rioters. Although all the windows were broken and the front door was destroyed by a lamp post which the rioters had used as a battering ram, the incident was concluded without any significant bloodshed.

A private house was built at the north end of the complex in 1840: the design of the building, which projected forward, involved two bays facing All Saints Street with the left bay containing a doorway and the right bay containing mullioned windows on both floors. The town hall remained in use as the meeting place of Bolton Corporation until the new town hall was completed in 1873 and continued to serve as a magistrates' court and a police station until November 1876. A link block between the town hall and the private house was added around that time, allowing the complex to be converted for use as a public library. It remained in that use from 1879 until the early 20th century and then served purely as a store for many years before operating as a local history museum from 1978 to 1993. After significant deterioration in the fabric of the building it was placed on the Heritage at Risk Register. It was then acquired by two entrepreneurs who initiated a programme of restoration works costing £450,000 allowing the building to be brought back into use as a café, bar and events venue: the first stage of the development opened for use in April 2019.

== See also ==
- Listed buildings in Bolton
