= Westhoughton Urban District =

Former local government area in the UK

Coordinates: 53.5486°N 2.5215°W

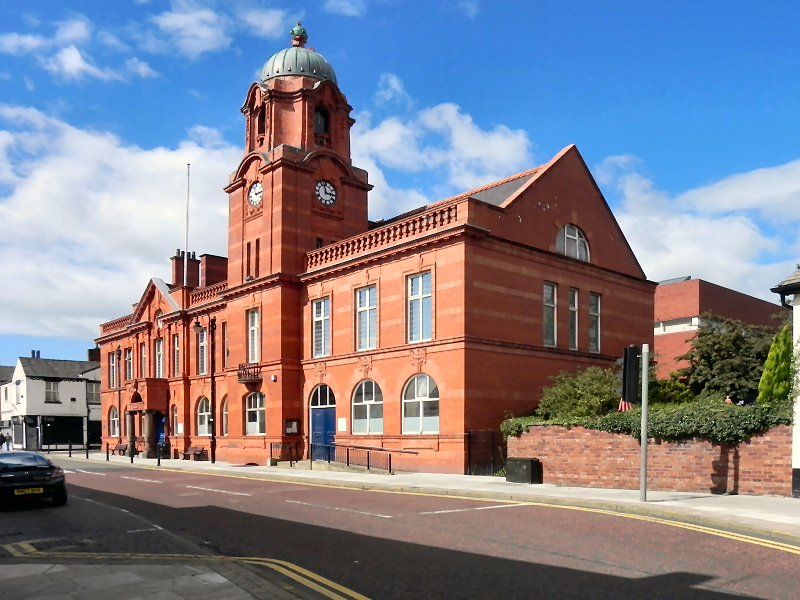
- Westhoughton Town Hall
- Area
  - 1911: 5,560 acres (22.5 km^{2})
  - 1961: 5,559 acres (22.5 km^{2})
- Area transferred
  - 1898: Large part of Over Hulton from Bolton Rural District
- Population
  - 1891: 12,042
  - 1971: 17,761
- History
  - Created: 1872
  - Abolished: 1974
  - Succeeded by: Metropolitan Borough of Bolton
- Status: Local board (1872–1894); Urban district (1894–1974)
  - HQ: Westhoughton Town Hall

Westhoughton was, from 1872 to 1974, a local government district centred on the town of Westhoughton in the administrative county of Lancashire, England.

== History ==
Westhoughton was a township and chapelry in the civil and ecclesiastical parish of Deane in the Salford Hundred of Lancashire. The township became part of the Bolton Poor Law Union on 1 February 1837 which took responsibility for funding the Poor Law within that Union area. In 1866, Westhoughton was given the status of a civil parish.

In 1872, a local board of health was adopted for the civil parish of Westhoughton. After the Public Health Act 1875 was passed by Parliament in that year, Westhougton Local Board of Health assumed extra duties as an urban sanitary district, although the Local Board's title did not change.

Following the implementation of the Local Government Act 1894, Westhoughton Local Board was replaced by an elected urban district council. Westhoughton Urban District was extended in 1898 by the addition of a large part of Over Hulton from the former Bolton Rural District, The Urban District Council had five electoral wards: Central, North, South, East, and Hulton, each represented by three councillors.

Under the Local Government Act 1972, Westhoughton Urban District was abolished on 1 April 1974 and its former area became an unparished area in the Metropolitan Borough of Bolton in Greater Manchester.
