= Tonge with Haulgh =

Former township in England

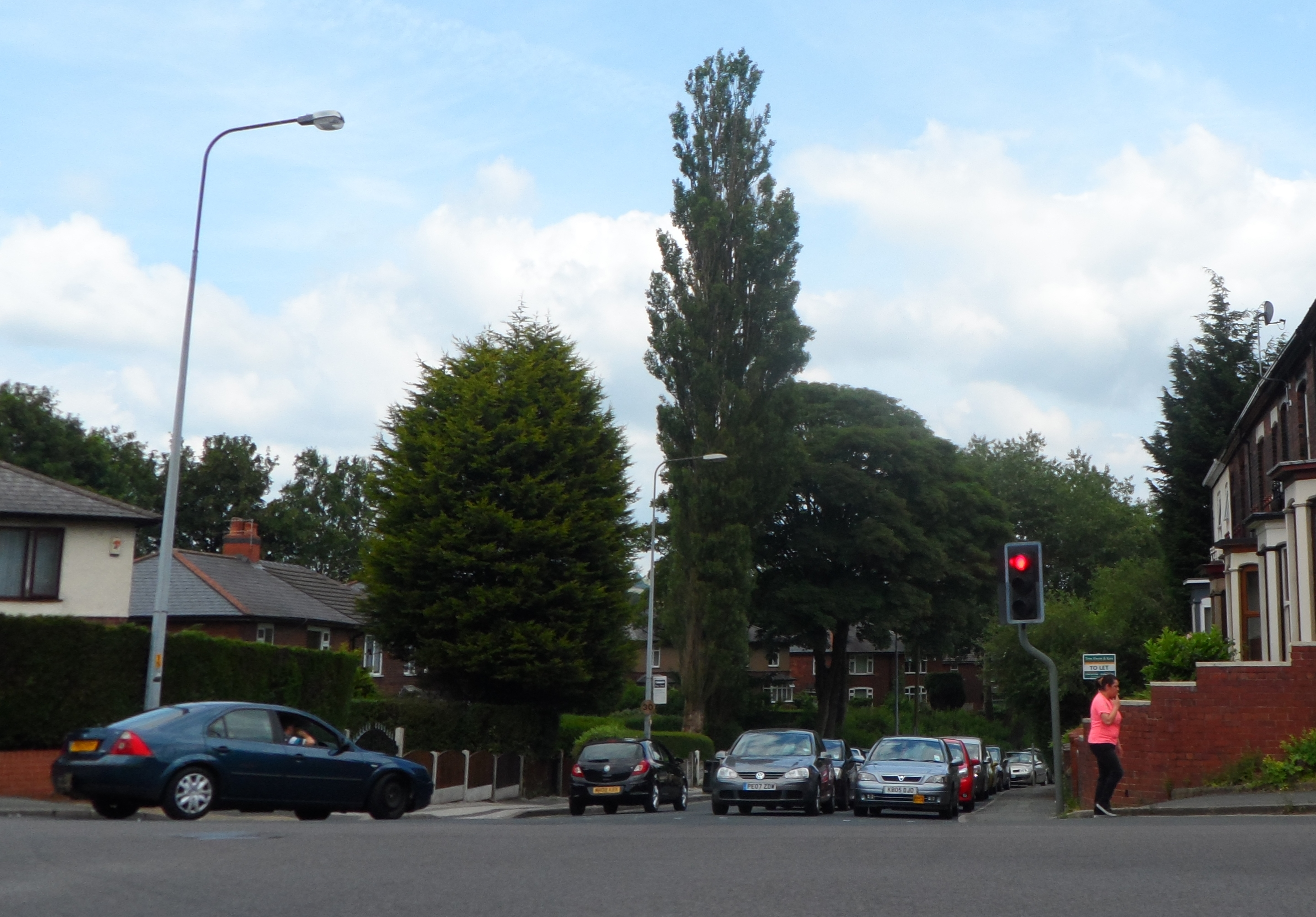
- Area
  - 1891: 1,099 acres (4.45 km^{2})
- Population
  - 1801: 1,158
  - 1891: 10,735
  - 2011: 13,156
  - 2021: 16,300
- History
  - Created: Middle Ages
  - Abolished: 1898
- Status: Township (until 1866), Civil parish (1866–98)

Tonge with Haulgh was a township of the civil and ecclesiastical parish of Bolton le Moors in the Salford hundred of Lancashire, England, and later a separate civil parish. In 1891 the parish had a population of 10,735.

== History ==
=== Toponymy ===
The first part of the township, Tonge, as its name implies, is located on the tongue of land between the River Tonge and Bradshaw Brook, which was derived from the Old English tang or twang meaning a fork in a river. The second part of the township, Haulgh, is derived from the Old English halh meaning a plot of flat alluvial land by a river.

=== Governance ===
Historically, Tonge with Haulgh formed part of the Hundred of Salford, a judicial division of southwest Lancashire. It was one of the townships that made up the ancient ecclesiastical parish of Bolton le Moors.

Under provisions of the Poor Relief Act 1662, townships replaced civil parishes as the main units of local administration in Lancashire. Tonge with Haulgh became one of the eighteen autonomous townships of the civil parish of Bolton le Moors.

In 1837, Tonge with Haulgh became one of the townships of the Bolton Poor Law Union, which took over the responsibility for the administration and funding of the Poor Law in that area. The following year, the Haulgh area of the township was incorporated into the municipal borough of Bolton. The remainder not merged with the municipal borough continued with the name "Tonge with Haulgh". In 1866, it changed its status from a township to a civil parish. From 1872, it was part of the Bolton Rural Sanitary district. In 1894 the parish of Tonge was formed from part of Halliwell, in the same year, Tonge became part of the Bolton Rural District. On 30 September 1895 the parish of Tonge with Haulgh was abolished and merged with Bolton. However, the rural district was abolished in 1898, and Tonge became an electoral ward of the County Borough of Bolton.

== Demography ==
Population changes in Tonge with Haulgh 1801–1891

Year	Population	±%
1801	1,158	—
1811	1,402	+21.1%
1821	1,678	+19.7%
1831	2,201	+31.2%

Year	Population	±%
1841	2,627	+19.4%
1851	2,826	+7.6%
1861	3,539	+25.2%
1871	4,050	+14.4%

Year	Population	±%
1881	6,731	+66.2%
1891	10,735	+59.5%

Sources: Local population statistics. Vision of Britain.

== Landmarks ==
The most notable building in the former township is Hall i' th' Wood, an early 16th-century manor house, and once the home of Samuel Crompton in the 18th century. The building was bought by William Lever (later Lord Leverhulme) in 1899, and after it was restored, he gave it to the Corporation of Bolton in 1900.

== Electoral ward ==
The two areas were reunited in 2004 as Tonge with The Haulgh, one of the twenty electoral wards of the Metropolitan Borough of Bolton in Greater Manchester. It elects three councillors to Bolton Council using the first past the post electoral method, electing one councillor every year without election on the fourth. The ward population at the 2021 census was 16,300.

== Bibliography ==
- Billington, W.D. (1982). From Affetside to Yarrow. Egerton: Ross Anderson Publications. ISBN 0-86360-003-4.
- Lewis, Samuel, ed. (1848). Bolton-Le-Moors (St. Peter). British History Online.
- Mills, David (1976). The Place Names of Lancashire. London: Batsford. ISBN 0-7134-3248-9.
