= Bolton Rural District =

Former local government area in the UK

Coordinates: 53.579°N 2.425°W

- History
  - Origin: Rural Sanitary District
  - Created: 1894
  - Abolished: 1898
  - Succeeded by: Bolton County Borough, Turton Urban District, Westhoughton Urban District
- Status: Rural district
- Government: Bolton Rural District Council
  - HQ: Bolton
- Subdivisions
  - Type: Civil parishes

Bolton Rural District was a short-lived rural district in the administrative county of Lancashire. It was created by the Local Government Act 1894 and comprised an area surrounding, but not including, the County Borough of Bolton. The district was abolished when the borough was extended in 1898.

The rural district was the successor to the Bolton Rural Sanitary District, which had been created in 1872. Whereas Bolton RSD was governed by a sanitary authority consisting of the local poor law guardians, the rural district was administered by the directly elected Bolton Rural District Council.

== Parishes ==
The district consisted of seventeen civil parishes:

- Belmont
- Bradshaw
- Breightmet
- Darcy Lever
- Deane
- Edgworth
- Entwistle
- Great Lever
- Harwood
- Heaton
- Longworth
- Lostock
- Middle Hulton
- Over Hulton
- Quarlton
- Smithills
- Tonge

== Abolition ==
The district was abolished under the Bolton Turton and Westhoughton Extension Act 1898 (61 & 62 Vict. c. ccxlii). Its area was distributed between the county borough and the urban districts of Turton and Westhoughton as follows:

- County Borough of Bolton: entire parishes of Breightmet, Darcy Lever, Deane, Great Lever, Lostock, Middle Hulton, Smithills, and Tonge, and the Daubhill area of Over Hulton.
- Turton Urban District: Belmont, Bradshaw, Edgworth, Entwistle, Harwood, Longworth and Quarlton
- Westhoughton Urban District: the remainder of Over Hulton.
