= St Thomas' Church, Halliwell =

Listed building in Greater Manchester, England

Coordinates: 53.5926°N 2.4427°W

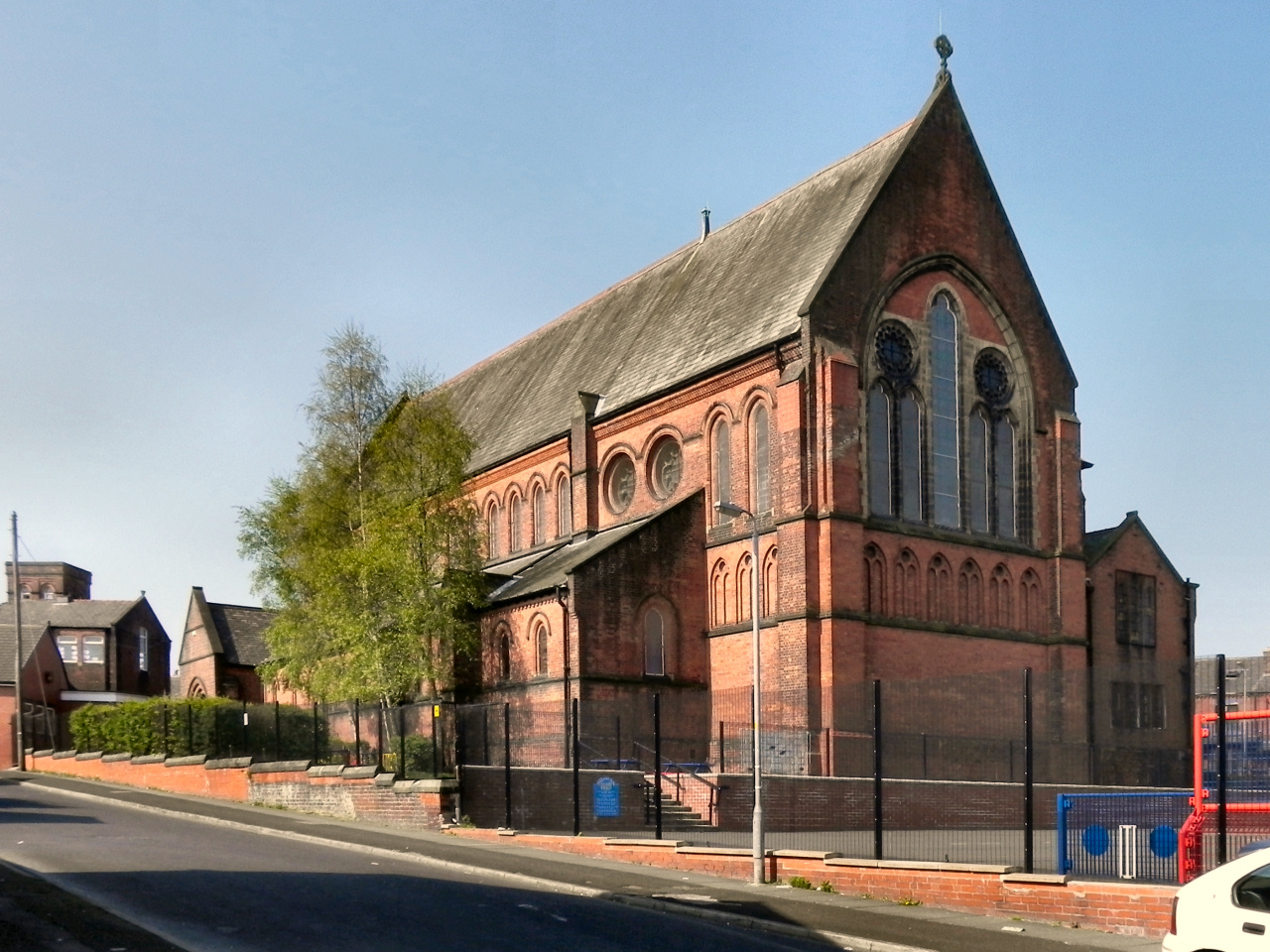
- St Thomas' Church, Halliwell, from the southeast

- Location in Greater Manchester
- OS grid reference: SD 708,108
- Location: Eskrick St, Halliwell, Bolton, Greater Manchester
- Country: England
- Denomination: Anglican
- Churchmanship: Central/Catholic
- Website: St Thomas, Halliwell

History
- Status: Parish church
- Dedication: Thomas the Apostle
- Consecrated: July 1875

Architecture
- Functional status: Active
- Heritage designation: Grade II*
- Designated: 26 April 1974
- Architect: Paley and Austin
- Architectural type: Church
- Style: Gothic Revival
- Completed: 1875

Specifications
- Materials: Brick, slate roofs

Administration
- Province: York
- Diocese: Manchester
- Archdeaconry: Bolton
- Deanery: Bolton
- Parish: St Thomas the Apostle, Bolton

Clergy
- Vicar: Revd Canon D. Rodger Petch

St Thomas' Church is an active Anglican parish church on Eskrick Street in Halliwell, a residential area of Bolton, Greater Manchester, England. It belongs to the deanery of Bolton, the archdeaconry of Bolton, and the diocese of Manchester. Its benefice is united with those of five other local churches to form the Benefice of West Bolton. The church is recorded in the National Heritage List for England as a Grade II* listed building.

== History ==
The church was built in 1874–75 to serve the growing local population, and was designed by the Lancaster architects Paley and Austin. The main benefactors were the Cross family, mill owners who lived nearby at Mortfield; Thomas Cross donated the site for the church, a school, and a vicarage, together with £1,000. The reredos was given by his son, James Percival Cross. The church marked an early use by the architects of brick on such a large scale. For its size it was relatively inexpensive, costing £6,400 (equivalent to £640,000 as of 2025), and providing seating for 849 people. It was consecrated in July 1875 by the Rt Revd James Fraser, Bishop of Manchester. A Lady Chapel was created in 1922 as a war memorial. New vestries were added to the church in 1931–32 at a cost of £882 by Austin and Paley, successors in the Lancaster practice. The planned northwest tower was never completed.

== Architecture ==
=== Exterior ===
St Thomas' is constructed almost entirely of brick, with minimal stone dressings, and has green slate roofs. Its plan consists of a wide nave with a clerestory, (Note: The width of the nave is 28 feet 6 inches (8.7 m).) north and south eight-bay aisles, north and south porches, a north transept with a bellcote, and a chancel with a two-storey vestry to the north. At the west end are stepped lancet windows flanked by rose windows. Below these is a central buttress, with a lancet window on each side. Each aisle bay contains a single lancet window, and there are 14 lancet windows along each side of the clerestory. The transept contains two lancets and a doorway with a rose window above. The bellcote is louvred, has a pyramidal roof, and forms a dormer. At the east end are stepped lancets, with a rose window above and blind arcading below.

=== Interior ===
The arcades have five bays, with round piers, leaf-and-crocket capitals, and brick arches. The internal surfaces of the church are in plain brick almost throughout, the exception being the east wall below the level of the windows. This wall consists of tiles set in brick recesses, depicting features such as fleur-de-lis, angels, and the Instruments of the Passion. The rectangular pulpit is of stone with marble shafts and an acanthus frieze. The sanctuary is floored with encaustic tiles. In the chancel is a piscina and a sedilia, both with segmental arches. The wooden reredos dates from 1893 and contains linenfold panels, flower motifs, figures of the apostles under canopies, and a low relief of The Last Supper. The choir stalls date from about 1911, and the altar from about 1960, replacing an earlier altar damaged by fire. The font dates from about 1950 and consists of a simple cylindrical basin. The stained glass in the east window of 1907 is possibly by Holland; windows in the aisles and Lady Chapel are by Shrigley and Hunt and date from about 1920; and the glass in one of the west windows is dated 1919. The organ was built in 1888 by Lewis, and was modified in 1902 and 1907 by the same company.

== Assessment ==
The church was listed at Grade II* on 26 April 1974. Grade II* is the middle of the three gradings given by Historic England, and is awarded to buildings that "are particularly important buildings of more than special interest". Brandwood et al. state that the relative cheapness of the structure was achieved by adopting a 13th-century style of architecture, with lancet windows and an interior mainly of bare brick, stone being used only for a few dressings and the piers. Apart from the east wall, its decoration is minimal. This is consistent with its being designed for a low church style of worship, which the norm in Bolton at the time. Nevertheless, it is "a testimony to the effects of the Victorian ecclesiastical revolution on Anglican church-building for all persuasions". Commenting on its structure, the authors of the Buildings of England series describe the church as "in its brick simplicity sensational for the date".

== See also ==
- Grade II* listed buildings in Greater Manchester
- Listed buildings in Bolton
- List of ecclesiastical works by Paley and Austin
- List of ecclesiastical works by Austin and Paley (1916–44)
