= Little Bolton =

Former township in Lancashire

Coordinates: 53.5898°N 2.4307°W

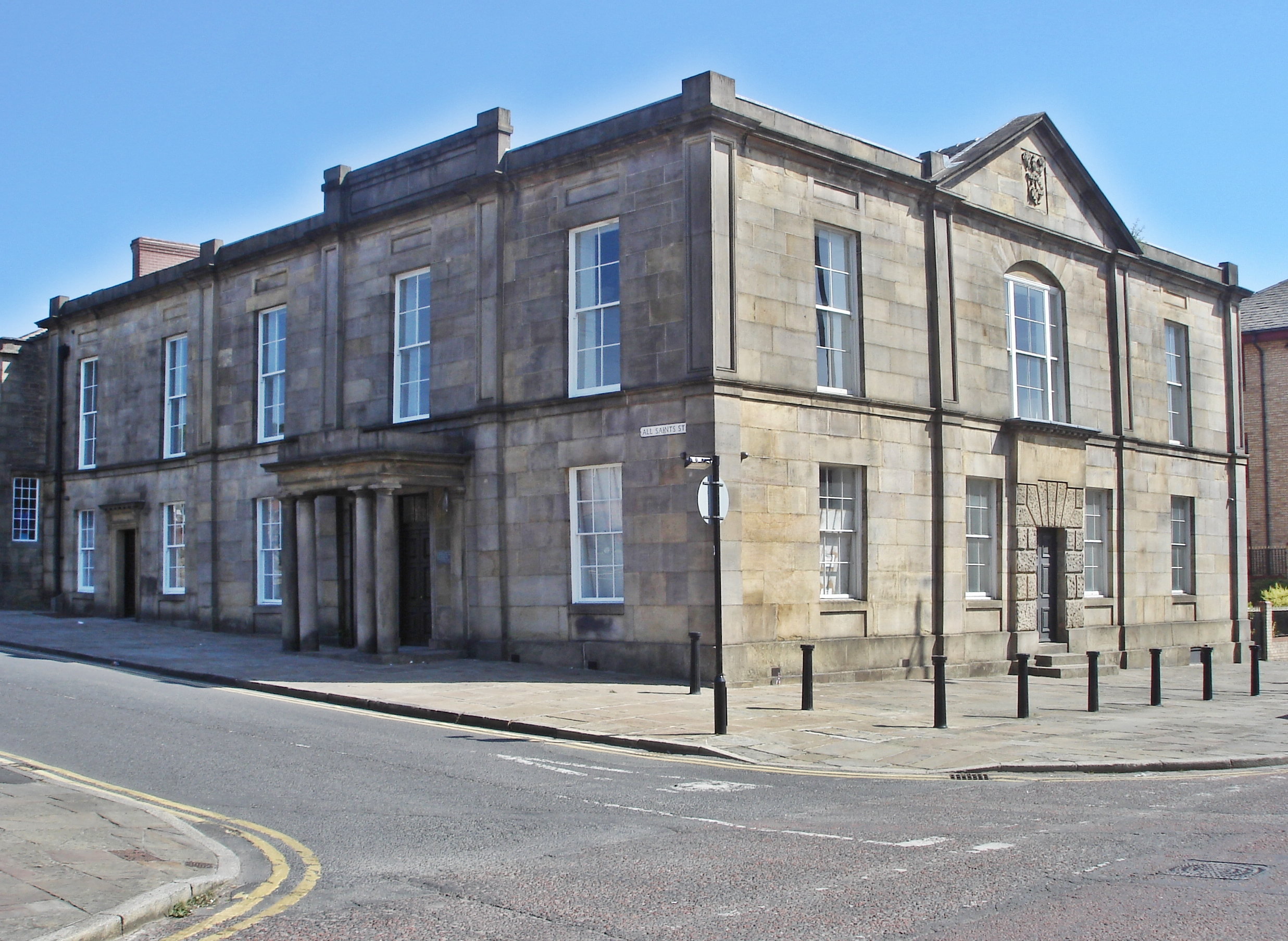
- Little Bolton Town Hall
- Area
  - 1881: 1,779 acres (7.20 km^{2})
  - 1891: 727 acres (2.94 km^{2})
- Population
  - 1801: 4,867
  - 1891: 44,307
- History
  - Created: Middle Ages
  - Abolished: 1895
- Status: Township (Until 1866), Civil parish (1866–95)
  - HQ: Little Bolton Town Hall

Little Bolton was a township of the civil and ecclesiastical parish of Bolton le Moors in the Salford hundred of Lancashire, England, and later a separate civil parish. Besides the main part of Little Bolton, it had three detached parts which were separated by areas of Lower Sharples and Higher Sharples. Despite its name, Little Bolton had a larger acreage than its southern neighbour Great Bolton, from which it was separated by the River Croal. In 1891 the parish had a population of 44,307.

== Governance ==
Historically, Little Bolton formed part of the Hundred of Salford, a judicial division of southwest Lancashire. It was one of the townships that made up the ancient ecclesiastical parish of Bolton le Moors.

Under provisions of the Poor Relief Act 1662, townships replaced civil parishes as the main units of local administration in Lancashire. Little Bolton became one of the eighteen autonomous townships of the civil parish of Bolton le Moors. The township appointed overseers of the poor who administered poor relief to those in need and Highway surveyors who maintained the roads, all of which was funded by levying a rate from the inhabitants of the township.

In 1792, the first of the Bolton Improvement Acts (32 Geo. 3. c. 71) was passed by Parliament which established the Little Bolton Police Commissioners (or Trustees) who took responsibility for improving the township. St George's Church, the township's first place of worship, was completed in 1796, and Little Bolton Town Hall was built in 1826. The Little Bolton Improvement Act 1830 (11 Geo. 4 & 1 Will. 4. c. xlvi) converted the trustees into an elected corporation.

Under the Municipal Corporations Act 1835, the municipal borough of Bolton was established in 1838 as a local authority, which comprised most of Little Bolton, the whole of Great Bolton, and the Haulgh area of the township of Tonge with Haulgh. The northern detached parts of Little Bolton were included in the area of Astley Bridge Local Board of Health in 1864. In 1866, Little Bolton became a civil parish. Although part of the Municipal Borough of Bolton from 1838, Little Bolton was used for the censuses until the civil parish was abolished on 30 September 1895 and merged with Bolton. For recording births, marriages, and deaths, Little Bolton continued as a sub-district of the Bolton registration district until 1947.

== Demography ==
Population changes in Little Bolton 1801–1891

Year	Population	±%
1801	4,867	—
1811	7,099	+45.9%
1821	9,258	+30.4%
1831	12,896	+39.3%

Year	Population	±%
1841	15,707	+21.8%
1851	19,888	+26.6%
1861	24,942	+25.4%
1871	35,013	+40.4%

Year	Population	±%
1881	41,937	+19.8%
1891	44,307	+5.7%

Sources: (a) Local population statistics. (b) A vision of Britain of through time.

== See also ==
- Bolton
- County Borough of Bolton
- Metropolitan Borough of Bolton
