= Markland Hill =

Coordinates: 53.5834°N 2.4764°W

Markland Hill is a mostly residential district of Bolton, Greater Manchester, England. Historically within Lancashire, it is about 2.5 miles to the north west of the town centre. It lies on the lower south facing slopes of the West Pennine Moors. It is bounded by Lostock to the south, Doffcocker to the north, and Heaton to the east. It occupied the northern part of the Heaton township.

Markland Hill County Primary School, which covers years Foundation to Year 6, is situated on Markland Hill. It is near Doffcocker Lodge lying within the Bolton Ring Road, which is locally designated as Victoria Road.
