= Heaton, Greater Manchester =

Coordinates: 53.581°N 2.462°W

Heaton
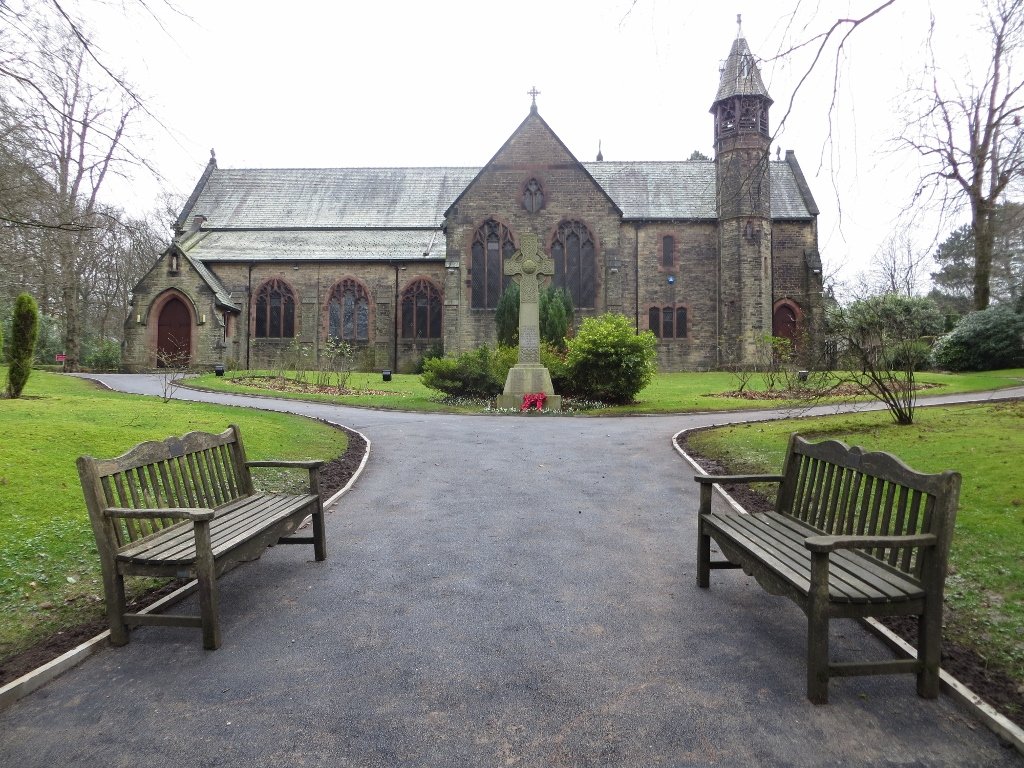
- Christ Church

- Location within Greater Manchester
- OS grid reference: SD695095
- Metropolitan borough: Bolton
- Metropolitan county: Greater Manchester
- Region: North West
- Country: England
- Sovereign state: United Kingdom
- Post town: BOLTON
- Postcode district: BL1
- Dialling code: 01204
- Police: Greater Manchester
- Fire: Greater Manchester
- Ambulance: North West
- UK Parliament: Bolton West

Heaton is mostly a residential district of Bolton, Greater Manchester, England. It lies about 2 miles (3 km) north west of Bolton town centre. It is bounded by Deane to the south, Markland Hill to the west, and Smithills and Halliwell to the north.

== History ==
Historically within the boundaries of the county of Lancashire, Heaton was created a township in the 12th century. It was in the ancient ecclesiastical parish of Deane in the hundred of Salford. Its name derives from the Old English heah and tun meaning enclosed ground on high land and it was recorded as Heton in 1227 and Heton under Horewich in 1332.

In the reign of Edward I Richard de Hulton had a charter of free warren in his demesne lands here. The Heatons were an important family in the Deane area. They date back to the 12th century and originated from around Ulverston in north Lancashire. From the 14th century some of the Heaton family held land in Heaton-under-the forest (or Heaton-under-Horwich) in the parish of Deane. This family lived in Heaton Old Hall and built Heaton New Hall. From this family they gave their surname to Deane's township of Heaton.

== Governance ==
Historically, Heaton had been part of the Hundred of Salford, a judicial division of southwest Lancashire. It was one of the 10 townships that made up the ecclesiastical parish of Deane. In 1866, Heaton's status was elevated from a township to a civil parish. Heaton became one of the civil parishes of the Bolton Rural Sanitary District from 1872 to 1894, then part of Bolton Rural District from 1894 to 1898, on 30 September 1898 the parish was abolished and merged with Bolton. In 1891 the parish had a population of 1599. Heaton then became a ward of the County Borough of Bolton from 1898 to 1974.

Since 1974, Heaton has been part of the Metropolitan Borough of Bolton. It gave its name to the Heaton Ward until 1980, then to the Deane-cum-Heaton Ward until 2004. Since 2004 Heaton forms part of the Heaton and Lostock Ward which is represented in Bolton Town Hall by three councillors. Heaton and Lostock Ward is also part of the Bolton West constituency and has been represented in the House of Commons by the Labour Party MP Phil Brickell since 2024.

== Geography ==
Heaton lies 2 miles (3 km) miles north west of Bolton on the lower south facing slopes of the West Pennine Moors. The township covered 1630 acres, its boundary is the River Croal to the south and is crossed by the road from Bolton to Chorley and contains the area of Markland Hill. The underlying rocks are Coal Measures containing sandstone and slate.

== Religion ==
Christ Church, Heaton has its origins in a second-hand iron church erected in 1878. The present church, designed by architect Richard Knill Freeman took a year to build and cost about £4,000 and was consecrated in 1896.

== Sport ==
Heaton Cricket Club play in the Bolton Cricket League.

== Bibliography ==
- Mills, David (1976), The Placenames of Lancashire, Batsford, ISBN 0-7134-5236-6
