= Great Bolton =

Historic subdivision in Northwest England

Coordinates: 53°34′42″N 2°25′50″W

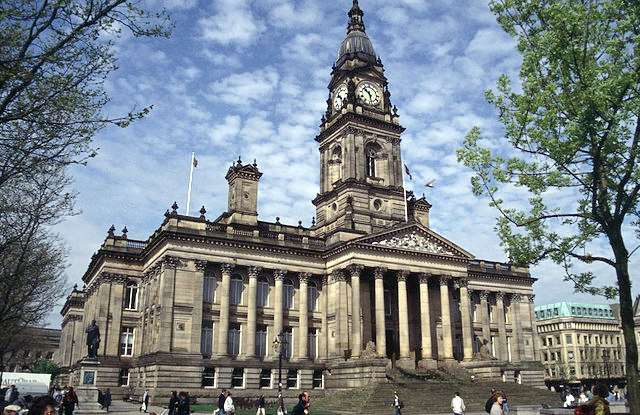
- Area
  - 1891: 826 acres (3.34 km^{2})
- Population
  - 1801: 12,549
  - 1891: 47,067
- History
  - Created: Middle Ages
  - Abolished: 1895
- Status: Township (Until 1866), Civil parish (1866–95)

Great Bolton was a township of the civil and ecclesiastical parish of Bolton le Moors in the Salford hundred of Lancashire, England and later a separate civil parish. Despite its name, Great Bolton had a smaller acreage than its northern neighbour Little Bolton from which it was separated by the River Croal. In 1891 the parish had a population of 47,067.

== Governance ==
Historically, Great Bolton formed part of the Hundred of Salford, a judicial division of southeast Lancashire. It was one of the townships that made up the ancient ecclesiastical parish of Bolton le Moors with St Peter's Church, Bolton as the Parish church.

Under provisions of the Poor Relief Act 1662, townships replaced civil parishes as the main units of local administration in Lancashire. Great Bolton became one of the eighteen autonomous townships of the civil parish of Bolton le Moors. The township appointed overseers of the poor who levied a rate to fund the Poor Law. Highway surveyors were also appointed and funded from the rate to maintain the roads.

By the eighteenth century Great Bolton was expanding rapidly and the Bolton Improvement Act 1792 (32 Geo. 3. c. 71) established the Great Bolton Improvement Trustees (or police commissioners) who took responsibility for regulating the streets, securing a water supply, removing nuisances, and licensing conveyances The act also provided the enclosure of Bolton Moor which was divided into building lots. In 1837, Great Bolton became part of the Bolton Poor Law Union, which took over the responsibility for the administration and funding of the Poor Law in that area.

Under the Municipal Corporations Act 1835, the Municipal borough of Bolton was established as a local authority in 1838, which comprised Great Bolton, most of the township of Little Bolton, and the Haulgh area of the township of Tonge with Haulgh. In 1866, Great Bolton changed its status to become a civil parish. Although Great Bolton was part of the Municipal Borough of Bolton from 1838, the township, later civil parish, was used for the censuses until it was abolished on 30 September 1895 and merged with Bolton. For recording births, marriages and deaths, Great Bolton continued as a sub-district until 1902, then part of the Great Bolton and Lever sub-district until 1941, both parts of the Bolton Registration district.

== Geography ==
The township was bounded on the north and east by the River Croal which eventually joins the River Irwell. The land was level apart from a clough or steep-banked valley occupied by the river Croal. The south western part of the township was occupied by moorland that gave the parish its early name.

A cross roads about 200 yards (180 m) from the Parish Church, St Peters, was the place where a market was held in the Middle Ages. From here the road to the east Churchgate led to the church, Deansgate to the west led towards Deane and Chorley, to the south Bradshawgate led to Manchester and to the north, Bank Street led to Little Bolton.

== Demography ==
Population changes in Great Bolton 1801–1891

Year	Population	±%
1801	12,549	—
1811	17,070	+36.0%
1821	22,037	+29.1%
1831	28,299	+28.4%

Year	Population	±%
1841	33,449	+18.2%
1851	39,923	+19.4%
1861	43,435	+8.8%
1871	45,313	+4.3%

Year	Population	±%
1881	45,694	+0.8%
1891	47,067	+3.0%

Sources: (a) Local population statistics. (b) A vision of Britain of through time.

== See also ==
- Bolton
- Metropolitan Borough of Bolton
