= Salford Hundred =

Historical area of Lancashire, England

Coordinates: 53.5606°N 2.2991°W

Hundred of Salford
- Lancashire Hundred

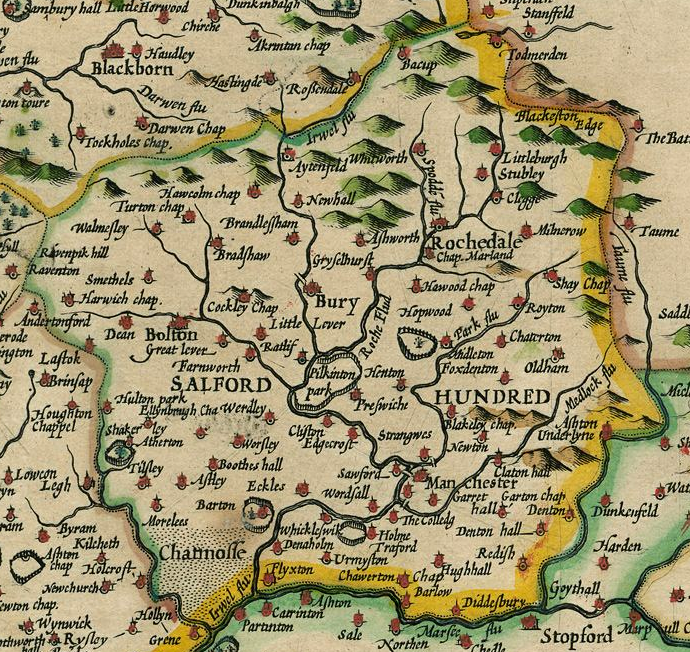
- Salford Hundred depicted in John Speed's 1610 map of Lancashire
- Area
  - 1831: 212,170 acres (859 km²)
- History
  - Created: Before Domesday
  - Abolished: Mid-18th century, never formally abolished
  - Succeeded by: Greater Manchester
- Status: Ancient Hundred
  - HQ: Salford
- Subdivisions
  - Type: Parish(es)
  - Units: Manchester • Ashton-under-Lyne • Eccles • Deane • Flixton • Radcliffe • Prestwich • Bury • Middleton • Rochdale • Bolton • Wigan (Aspull)

Hundreds of Lancashire

The Salford Hundred (also known as Salfordshire) was one of the subdivisions (a hundred) of the historic county of Lancashire in Northern England. Its name alludes to its judicial centre being the township of Salford (the suffix -shire meaning the territory was appropriated to the prefixed settlement). It was also known as the Royal Manor of Salford and the Salford wapentake.

== Origins ==
The Manor or Hundred of Salford had Anglo-Saxon origins. The Domesday Book recorded that the area was held in 1066 by Edward the Confessor. Salford was recorded as part of the territory of Inter Ripam et Mersam or "Between Ribble and Mersey", and it was included with the information about Cheshire, though it cannot be said clearly to have been part of Cheshire.

The area became a subdivision of the County Palatine of Lancaster (or Lancashire) on its creation in 1182.

== Salford Hundred Court ==
In spite of its incorporation into Lancashire, Salford Hundred retained a separate jurisdiction for the administration of justice, known as the Court Leet, View of frankpledge, and Court of Record of our Sovereign Lord the King for his Hundred or Wapentake of Salford. Exceptionally for hundred courts, Salford survived until the 19th century. The lordship of Salford passed with the Duchy of Lancaster to the Crown, and a serjeant or bailiff was appointed to administer the hundred on the king's behalf. In 1436 the office of Hereditary Steward of the Wapentake of Salfordshire was granted to Sir Richard Molyneux of Sefton. The office was held by Sir Richard's successors, the Earls of Sefton until 1972.

The Portmote of the Borough of Salford merged with the Hundred Court in the 17th century, and the latter body took over the administrative business of the manorial borough. In 1792 police commissioners were established in Manchester and Salford, and the Hundred Court was left with few powers. By 1828 the activities of the court consisted of the following:

- A twice-yearly meeting of jury-men chose the borough reeve of Salford, along with two constables, a dog-muzzler, ale-taster and inspectors of flesh and fish for the town. The meeting also appointed constables in those townships that did not possess their own court leet. In these townships it also possessed powers to deal with noxious smells and smoke from factories, clearing obstructions of the highway, fencing of roads, foul ditches and enforcement of weights and measures.
- A three-weekly court for the recovery of debts of less than forty shillings. These were held every third Thursday by one of three deputy stewards (usually prominent local solicitors) appointed by the Earl of Sefton.

=== Reform ===
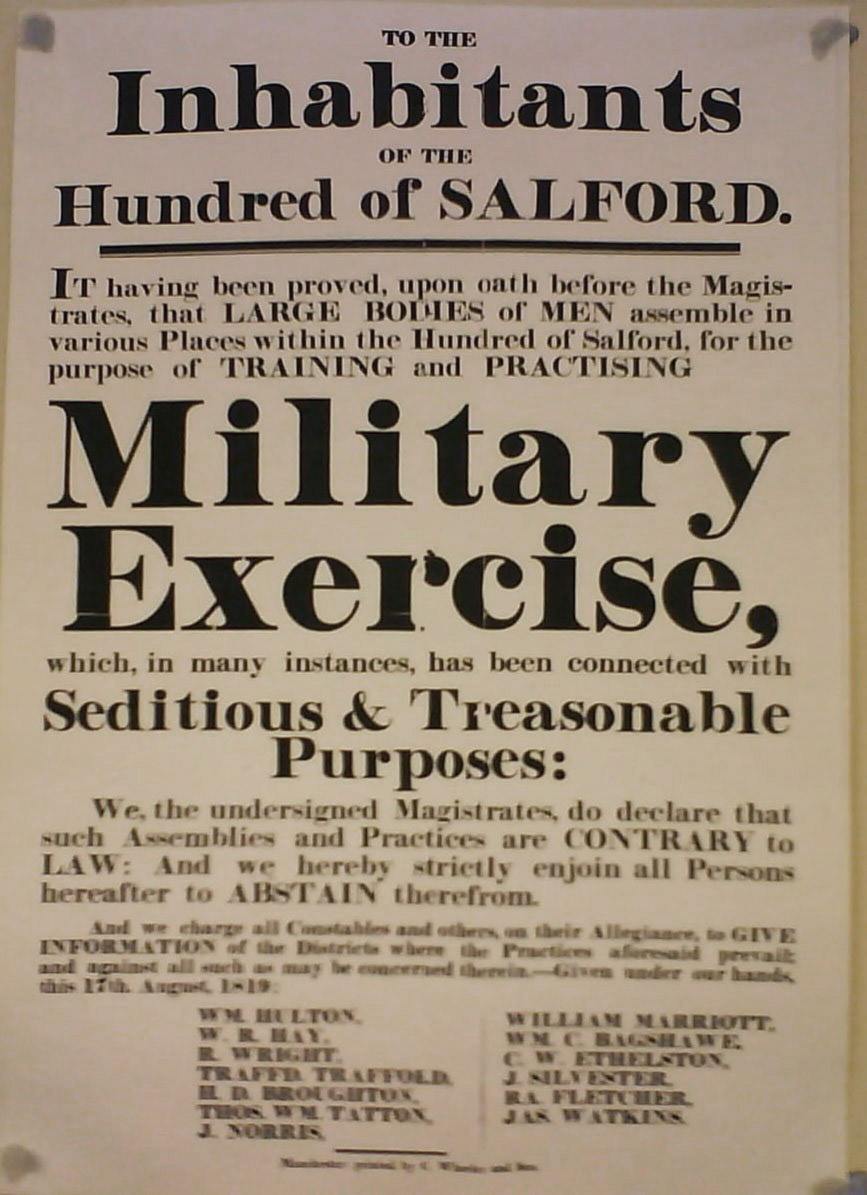
Notice "to the inhabitants of the Hundred of Salford", published by magistrates the day after the Peterloo Massacre

Salford Hundred Court Act 1846
- Act of Parliament
- Parliament of the United Kingdom
- Long title: An Act for more effectually regulating the Salford Hundred Court, for extending the Jurisdiction and Powers of the said Court, and for establishing and constituting it as a Court of Record.
- Citation: 9 & 10 Vict. c. cxxvi

Dates
- Royal assent: 26 June 1846

Salford Hundred Court of Record Act 1868
- Act of Parliament
- Parliament of the United Kingdom
- Long title: An Act to amalgamate the Court of Record for the Hundred of Salford in the County of Lancaster and the Court of Record for the Trial of Civil Actions within the City of Manchester, and to constitute the said amalgamated Court the Court of Record for the Hundred of Salford in the County of Lancaster, with extended Powers, and to regulate the Practice and Procedure therein; and for other Purposes.
- Citation: 31 & 32 Vict. c. cxxx
- Territorial extent: United Kingdom

Dates
- Royal assent: 13 July 1868
- Commencement: 13 July 1868 (Note: The Acts of Parliament (Commencement) Act 1793.)
- Repealed: 1 January 1972

Other legislation
- Amended by: Salford Hundred Court of Record Act 1911
- Repealed by: Courts Act 1971

Status: Repealed

In 1846 the court was reformed to become a Court of Record with its jurisdiction extended to debts not exceeding fifty pounds in value. In 1838 Manchester was incorporated as a municipal borough and granted its own court of record. The two courts were merged as the Salford Hundred Court of Record in 1869 by the Salford Hundred Court of Record Act 1868 (31 & 32 Vict. c. cxxx). The court had jurisdiction in personal actions only.

Areas were exempted from the jurisdiction of the hundred court:

- The County Borough of Oldham by the Oldham Corporation Act 1886 (49 & 50 Vict. c. cxvii) of 25 June 1886
- The County Borough of Bolton by an Order in Council of 16 August 1886
- The Municipal Borough of Heywood by an Order in Council of 15 March 1893
- The County Borough of Rochdale by an Order in Council of 15 March 1893

Salford Hundred Court of Record Act 1911 (Note: Section 16(1).)
- Act of Parliament
- Parliament of the United Kingdom
- Long title: An Act to amend the Salford Hundred Court of Record Act 1868.
- Citation: 1 & 2 Geo. 5. c. clxxii
- Territorial extent: United Kingdom

Dates
- Royal assent: 16 December 1911
- Commencement: 1 April 1912 (Note: Section 17.)
- Repealed: 1 January 1972

Other legislation
- Amends: Salford Hundred Court of Record Act 1868
- Repealed by: Courts Act 1971

Status: Repealed

Text of statute as originally enacted

In 1910 a committee was appointed by the Chancellor of the Duchy of Lancaster to report on the practices, area and jurisdiction of the court, and whether it was "of benefit to the parties for whose use it was intended". One member of the three-man committee recommended the abolition of the court which had "little but its age to justify its continuance", while the majority called for amending legislation. Accordingly, the Salford Hundred Court of Record Act 1911 (1 & 2 Geo. 5. c. clxxii) was passed to restrict the area of the court to the county court areas of Manchester and Salford and to alter its procedures and costs.

Forty years later the court was again referred to a review committee. The committee's report recommended that the court be retained as it provided "a popular and speedy remedy for a large number of litigants in the area". In 1956 the court's area was extended to encompass the entire County Borough of Stockport, which was deemed to belong to the County of Lancashire and the Hundred of Salford for the purposes of assizes, quarter sessions and licensing. The Court of Record for the Hundred of Salford was abolished by section 43(1)(d) of the Courts Act 1971. The last hereditary steward, Hugh Molyneux, 7th Earl of Sefton died on 13 April 1972.

=== Prisons ===
Separate places of detention were maintained for the hundred: the New Bailey Prison in Salford, which was replaced by Strangeways Prison in 1868.

== Constituent areas ==
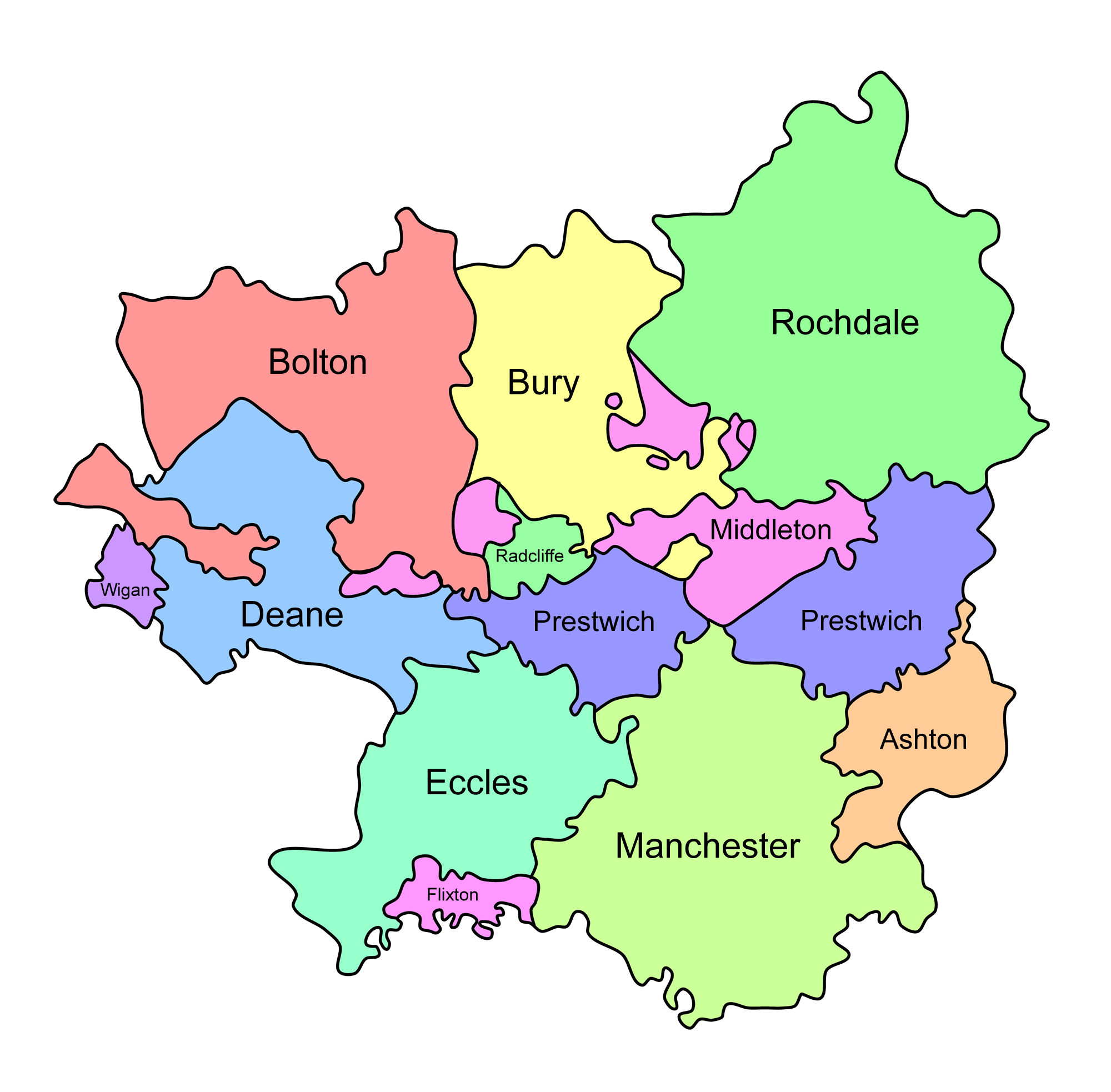
Salfordshire encompassed several parishes

The area it occupied, 212,170 acres (859 km^{2}), corresponds loosely to the modern metropolitan county of Greater Manchester, though excludes those parts from the historic county boundaries of Cheshire, as well as most of that that forms the modern Metropolitan Borough of Wigan. Its area also extended into territory north of what is now Greater Manchester, including parts of Rossendale and Todmorden.

The parish of Manchester formed part of Salfordshire. It has been suggested that a Manchester-shire hundred was not favoured over one centred at Salford because Manchester had been ravaged as part of the Viking occupation.

The parish of Rochdale, in Salfordshire, included the chapelry of Saddleworth from the historic county boundaries of Yorkshire.

=== Parishes and townships ===
Salfordshire comprised several parishes and townships during its history. These were not static, but fragmented with the establishment of daughter churches and chapels and increases in population. The parish of Prestwich-cum-Oldham originally included the parishes of Bury, Middleton and Radcliffe, and the parish of Manchester originally included the parish of Ashton-under-Lyne. The township of Hundersfield was one of Rochdale parish's four original townships, but was itself split into four. Similarly, Prestwich-cum-Oldham was later split into two separate parishes of Prestwich and Oldham.

In 1830, Salfordshire was documented to consist of the following parishes and townships:

| Hundred | Parish | Townships | Notes |
|---|---|---|---|
| Salford | Ashton-under-Lyne | Ashton-under-Lyne | Ashton-under-Lyne was a "single parish-township", but was divided into four divisions (sometimes each styled townships): Ashton Town, Audenshaw, Knott Lanes and Hartshead. |
| Salford | Bolton le Moors | Great Bolton, Little Bolton, Anglezarke, Blackrod, Bradshaw, Breightmet, Darcy Lever, Edgworth, Entwistle, Harwood, Little Lever, Longworth, Lostock, Quarlton, Rivington, Sharples, Tonge with Haulgh, Turton | |
| Salford | Bury | Bury, Elton, Heap, Walmersley (with Shuttleworth), Tottington Higher End, Tottington Lower End, Musbury, Cowpe, Lench, Newhall Hey, Hall Carr (Note: Cowpe, Lench, Newhall Hey, and Hall Carr was a single township, which subsequently became part of Rawtenstall.) | |
| Salford | Deane | Rumworth, Horwich, Heaton, Halliwell, Westhoughton, Little Hulton, Middle Hulton, Over Hulton, Farnworth, Kearsley | |
| Salford | Eccles | Barton, Pendleton, Clifton, Worsley, Pendlebury | |
| Salford | Flixton | Flixton, Urmston | |
| Salford | Manchester | Ardwick, Beswick, Blackley, Bradford, Broughton, Burnage, Cheetham, Chorlton-cum-Hardy, Chorlton-on-Medlock, Crumpsall, Denton, Didsbury, Droylsden, Failsworth, Gorton, Harpurhey, Haughton, Heaton Norris, Hulme, Levenshulme, Manchester, Moss Side, Moston, Newton, Openshaw, Reddish, Rusholme, Salford, Stretford, Withington | |
| Salford | Middleton | Middleton, Pilsworth, Hopwood, Thornham, Birtle-With-Bamford, Ashworth, Ainsworth, Great Lever | |
| Salford | Prestwich-cum-Oldham | Alkrington, Chadderton, Crompton, Great Heaton, Little Heaton, Oldham, Pilkington, Prestwich, Royton, Tonge | |
| Salford | Radcliffe | Radcliffe | |
| Salford | Rochdale | Castleton, Spotland, Butterworth, Wuerdle and Wardle, Wardleworth, Blatchinworth and Calderbrook, Todmorden and Walsden. | Rochdale also included the chapelry of Saddleworth from the West Riding of Yorkshire |
| West Derby | Wigan | Aspull | Aspull was a township in Salfordshire, but attached ecclesiastically to the Wigan parish of West Derby hundred. |

== See also ==
- List of hundreds of England and Wales

== Bibliography ==
- Hollingworth, Richard (1839). Mancuniensis; Or, an History of the Towne of Manchester, and what is Most Memorable Concerning it. W. Willis.
