= Horrocks Fold =

Coordinates: 53.613°N 2.448°W

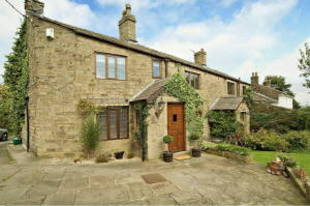
- Cottages at Horrocks Fold

- Location within Greater Manchester
- OS grid reference: SD703130
- Metropolitan borough: Bolton
- Metropolitan county: Greater Manchester
- Region: North West
- Country: England
- Sovereign state: United Kingdom
- Post town: BOLTON
- Postcode district: BL1
- Dialling code: 01204
- Police: Greater Manchester
- Fire: Greater Manchester
- Ambulance: North West
- UK Parliament: Bolton North East

Horrocks Fold is a hamlet in Bolton, Lancashire, England. It is 4 miles (6 km) northwest of Bolton town centre and 2.5 miles (4 km) southeast of Belmont. Horrocks Fold lies on the southern slopes of the West Pennine Moors. Originally a farm and collection of barns and outbuildings, the site was converted to private residences in the early 1980s.

Historically a part of Lancashire, Horrocks Fold is located up an unadopted lane off Belmont Road (A675). Several paths, tracks and nature trails lead to Horrocks Fold Wood, Scout Road, Smithills Hall and Barrow Bridge.

It was once home to former Nottingham Forest player, John McGovern when he managed Bolton Wanderers.

It should not be confused with the Horrocks Fold in nearby Edgworth, which is also in Lancashire.
