= Tonge, Bolton =

Area of Bolton in Greater Manchester, England

Coordinates: 53.580563°N 2.405073°W

Tonge
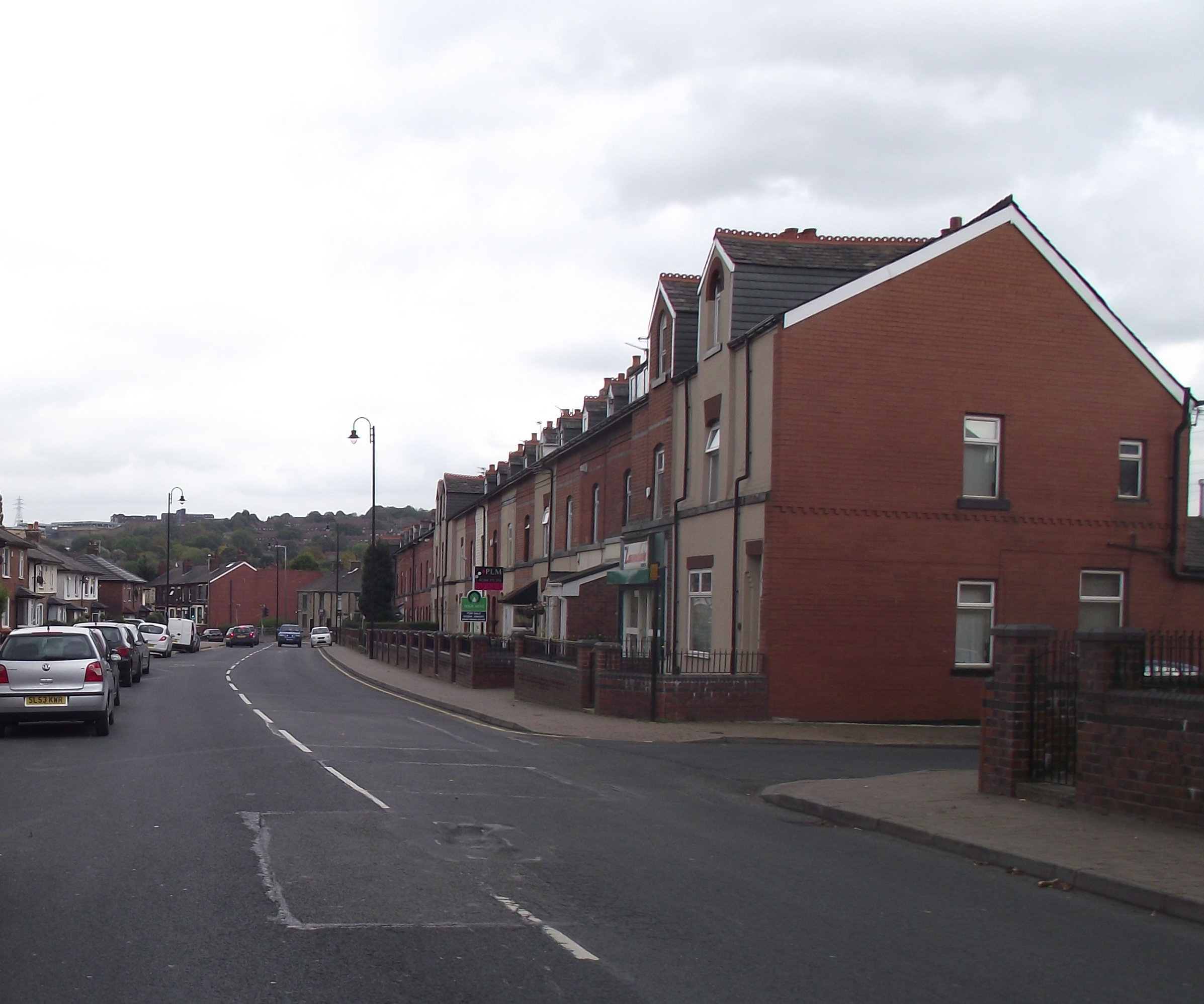
- Thicketford Road

- Location within Greater Manchester
- OS grid reference: SD733094
- Metropolitan borough: Bolton
- Metropolitan county: Greater Manchester
- Region: North West
- Country: England
- Sovereign state: United Kingdom
- Post town: BOLTON
- Postcode district: BL2
- Dialling code: 01204
- Police: Greater Manchester
- Fire: Greater Manchester
- Ambulance: North West
- UK Parliament: Bolton North East

Tonge is an outlying area of Bolton, in Greater Manchester, England. The name is supposed to be derived from the Old English "tang" or "twang" meaning a fork in a river. Tonge comprises two areas, namely Tonge Fold and Tonge Moor. Tonge Fold sits upon the River Tonge, a region of whose banks are a geological site of special scientific interest (SSSI).

== History ==
Historically a part of Lancashire, it was once part of the township and chapelry of Bolton parish. By the end of the 19th century Tonge was home to a coal mine. In 1894 Tonge became a separate civil parish, being formed from the rural part of Halliwell, on 30 September 1898 the parish was abolished and merged with Bolton.

== Education ==
There are four primary schools in Tonge;-

- Moorgate Country Primary School
- Tonge Moor Academy Primary School
- Castle Hill Primary School
- St Columba's RC Primary School

Tonge does not have any secondary schools within its borders, though schools like Canon Slade School, Turton School and Sharples School are popular choices around the area.

== Landmarks ==
A noteworthy building in Tonge is Hall i' th' Wood, an early 16th-century manor house, and once the home of Samuel Crompton in the 18th century. The building was bought by William Lever (later Lord Leverhulme) in 1899, and after it was restored, he gave it to Bolton Corporation in 1900.

The public cemetery, laid out by William Henderson, was opened in 1856, with extant buildings by Charles Holt and John Smalman Smith, 29 acres (12 ha) of land having been purchased from Le Gendre Nicholas Starkie.
