= Longworth, Lancashire =

Coordinates: 53°58′36″N 2°52′29″W

Longworth
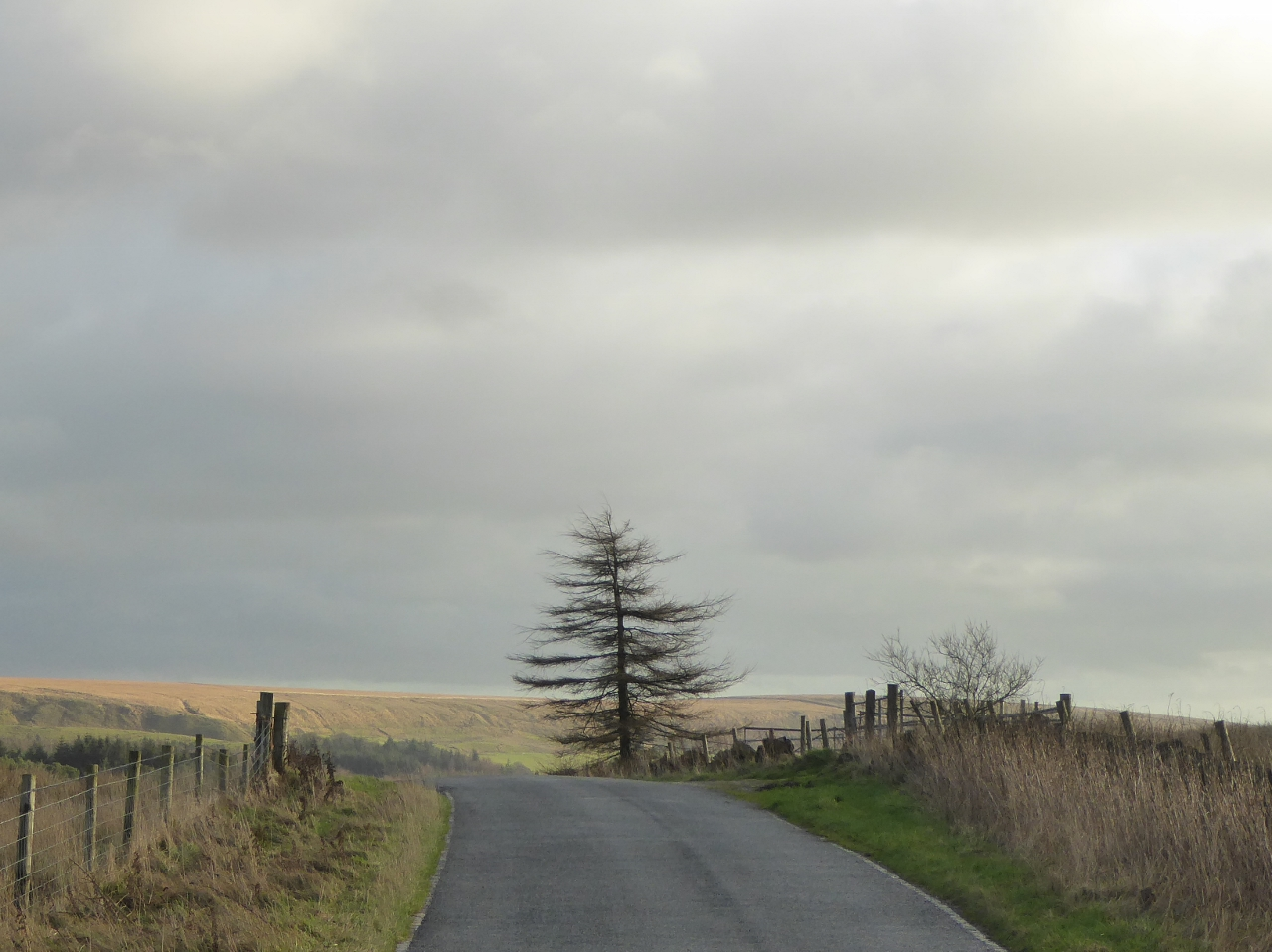
- Area
  - 1891: 1,654 acres (6.69 km^{2})
- Population
  - 1801: 249
  - 1891: 102
- History
  - Created: Middle Ages
  - Abolished: 1898
  - Succeeded by: Turton
- Status: Township (until 1866), Civil parish (1866–1898)

Longworth was a township of the civil and ecclesiastical parish of Bolton le Moors in the Salford hundred of Lancashire, England. In 1891 it had a population of 102.

== History ==
The township was recorded as Longeworthe in 1254, Lunggewrthe in 1278 and Longeworth in 1290. The Old English suffix worth denotes an enclosure or enclosed settlement.

The manor was held of the lords of Manchester as two oxgangs of land by families which assumed the local surname. Longworths lived there from the Middle Ages until the mid 17th century. Matthew, son of Siward de Longworth, made a grant of land to Cockersand Abbey about the beginning of the 13th century. John de Longworth in 1288 successfully asserted his right to 100 acres of moor in Longworth. Pedigrees were entered at the heraldic visitations in 1567 and 1613. Christopher Longworth died in 1608, holding land and a water mill. Thomas Longworth and Dorothy his wife made a settlement of the manor of Longworth in 1632. After that the manor was sold, probably to the Lacys who recorded a pedigrees in 1664. No house in the township had more than two hearths in 1666, except Thomas Lacy's, which had seven out of a total of twenty-one. In 1738 Longworth is named in a settlement of the estates of William Hulton of Over Hulton.

In 1907 the township was purchased by the Bolton Corporation to build the Delph reservoir. There was a quarry and a cotton mill which was demolished by Bolton Corporation when they bought the land.

== Governance ==
Historically, Longworth formed part of the Hundred of Salford, a judicial division of southwest Lancashire. It was one of the townships that made up the ancient ecclesiastical parish of Bolton le Moors.

Under provisions of the Poor Relief Act 1662, townships replaced parishes as the main units of local administration in Lancashire. Longworth became one of the eighteen autonomous townships of the parish of Bolton le Moors. In 1837, Longworth became one of the townships of the Bolton Poor Law Union, which took over the responsibility for the administration and funding of the Poor Law in that area. As with other townships in Lancashire in 1866, Longworth became a civil parish. For a short while, Longworth became part of the Bolton Rural District in 1894, however, that short lived rural district was dissolved in 1898. On 30 September 1898 the civil parish of Longworth was abolished and merged with Turton and became part of Turton Urban District.

== Geography ==
Longworth was on the south west slope of Turton Moor and the lower land to the south east between the Longworth and Delph Brooks. The area of the township was 1,654 acres (6.69 km^{2}). There was a hall but there was no village or hamlet within the township boundary and the land was chiefly pasture. A road from Egerton passed near the south west border and the ancient road from Blackburn to Bolton through Tockholes crossed the township.

== Demography ==
Year	1801	1811	1821	1831	1841	1851	1861	1871	1881	1891
Population	249	226	238	179	149	152	154	113	106	102
Sources: Local population statistics. Vision of Britain.
