= Darcy Lever =

Coordinates: 53.569°N 2.401°W

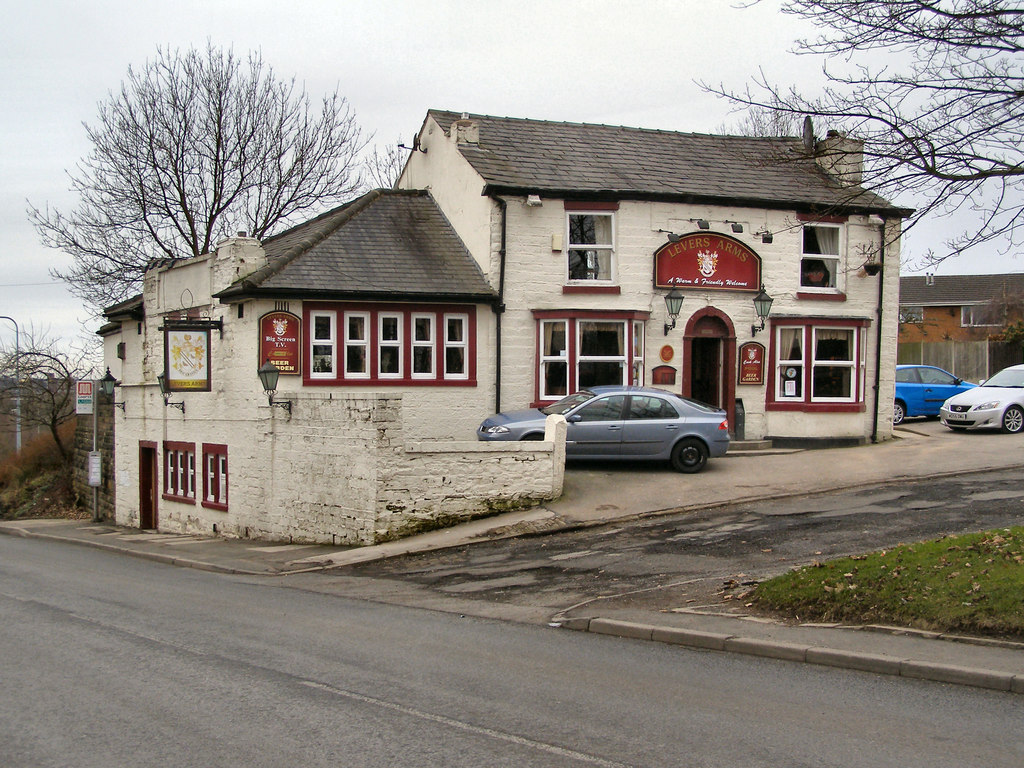
- The Levers Arms public house, Darcy Lever

- Location within Greater Manchester
- OS grid reference: SD735081
- Metropolitan borough: Bolton
- Metropolitan county: Greater Manchester
- Region: North West
- Country: England
- Sovereign state: United Kingdom
- Post town: BOLTON
- Postcode district: BL3
- Dialling code: 01204
- Police: Greater Manchester
- Fire: Greater Manchester
- Ambulance: North West
- UK Parliament: Bolton North East

Darcy Lever is an area of Bolton, in Greater Manchester, England. Historically part of Lancashire, the area lies on the B6209 (Radcliffe Road), between Bolton and Little Lever. Its history dates to the time of William the Conqueror when it was part of the Salford hundred given to Roger of Poitou for his participation in the Norman Conquest of England.

== History ==
=== Toponymy ===
Lever was recorded as Parua Lefre in 1212, from the Latin, parva meaning little and laefre, which is derived from the Old English meaning 'place where the rushes grow'. The name was recorded in several ways, whilst the spellings differ the pronunciation was similar to 'lever' – Lethre 1221; Leuere 1278; Leuir 1282; Leuer 1291 and Leyver 1550. Initially, Lever was the name for the hamlets comprising the manor of Lever. In 1509 it became Darcye Lever, the distinguishing affix coming from possession by the D'Arcy family.

=== Manor ===
NOTE : Until 1509 the area called Darcy Lever today was part of the Manor of Little Lever. In the text, where the name is given in italicised text with square brackets, it refers to the area of Darcy Lever before it gained that name.

Darcy Lever dates to the Norman Conquest when it was part of the Salford Hundred. This area was given to Roger of Poitou following the Norman conquest of England. In the 12th century it was owned by Albert Greslet, the 1st Baron of Manchester. The manor of Little Lever has, from early times, been split into Little Lever and Darcy Lever.

The manor formed part of the barony of Manchester and was assessed as four oxgangs of land. From an early time it was held in moieties. Albert Grelley the younger in the time of Henry II gave one moiety to Alexander son of Uvieth at a rent of ½ mark and a hawk or 12d. The tenant's name is not recorded in 1212 but in 1227 Adam de Radcliffe was required to perform suit at Robert Grelley's court in Manchester fortnightly instead of monthly. A little earlier Eugenia, widow of William de Radcliffe, demanded from the same Adam de Radcliffe, her dower of four oxgangs in Little Lever. so the Radcliffes probably held Little Lever between 1212 and 1221. The next lord is Leising de Lever who had part of Great Lever. Possibly descended from him was Adam de Lever who was living in 1246, ancestor of the Levers of Little Lever, who held a share of the manor until the beginning of the 17th century.

In the Lever of Great Lever are charters referring to the Lever family. Adam de Lever and his son Ellis attested a grant; no. 45. Ellis son of Adam de Lever granted to William his son and his heirs a portion of his land in Little Lever. The bounds began at 'the Langcestre' (alias Hanycestre) where Denebrook fell into the great water called Lever (alias Letoce); ascended the brook to a ditch dividing Little Lever and Breightmet as far as the Menesshaw; went down to the Tonge water, and down this to the first division. These boundaries are those of the present township of Darcy Lever. The grant included the homage of Richard del Snape, who paid 13d. rent, and other services; and the land was held of the chief lords of the fee by a rent of 4s., paid at the four terms, and by such other services as Ellis had rendered for the whole manor of Little Lever

Nothing relating to the Lever family descent was recorded as to the second moiety of the manor, from 1310 to 1448, when Henry Lever the elder, Giles, and Henry the younger, a son of Giles, held it on a lease for life of Alice, widow of Sir Robert Tempest. Despite the absence of satisfactory evidence of the family descent some facts can be stated; that in 1320 William de Radcliffe and William de Lever held [Darcy Lever] by homage, service, and suit to the court of Manchester and that they paid 4d sake fee for the lands being [Darcy Lever] held by Ellis de Lever. They also paid 6s 8d in rent and 12d in lieu of the hawk. In 1331 a settlement of a moiety of the manor was made by Ellis de Lever in favour of his son and his issue by Agnes his wife. The documents show that the Radcliffes were responsible for the whole rent but it also appears that the [Darcy Lever] half of the manor had been granted away, but to whom is not known.

In 1473, John Lever held half of the manor by the twentieth part of a knight's fee, a rent of 3s 4d and a sake fee of 2d, while Sir Richard Tempest held the other moiety, the Levers [Darcy Lever]. The records do not show how Sir Richard came into possession of the lands but one can assume it was Sir Richards wife (married 1407) Dame Alice Tempest's inheritance. In 1509, Dousabella, daughter and heir of Sir Richard married Sir Thomas Darcy who was created Baron D'Arcy and gave his name to the part of the manor he inherited by marriage. D'Arcy opposed the dissolution of the monasteries by Henry VIII and was attained taking part in the Pilgrimage of Grace in 1536, he was beheaded on 30 June 1537.

In 1557, Thurstan Tyldesley of Tyldesley took possession of Darcy Lever, together with several other manors and lands. Five years later the Darcy Lever estate was mortgaged by Tyldesley to Richard Chisnall and Thurstan Baron. In 1566 land was sold by Tyldesly to Oliver Chisnall and Thomas Lassell. Darcy Lever is mentioned as is Great Lever. By 1581, there was a large parcel of messuages and lands in Darcy Lever, Lawrence Fogg and Thomas Heyton are named as plaintiffs. Fogg died in 1605 and the land passed to his son Richard. Heyton died on 3 May 1587 and his heir was John Chisnall who was the son of Thomas, the brother of Richard Chisnall mentioned above. The manor remained in the Chisnall family until 1635 when Edward Chisnall died. At the time of his death he was receiving a rent of £5 15s. In 1601 the above-mentioned Lawrence Fogg and his new partner Robert Lever purchased lands from Chisnall. For this they were summoned to Manchester to do their suit and service.

During the time the Chisnalls held Darcy Lever, Ralph Byrom held twelve messuages, half a water mill and fulling mill. Richard Fogg in 1612, purchased land from Ralph's son Adam Byron. When Fogg died in September 1630, the holding had increased to twenty messuages, a water mill and moiety of two fulling mills along with other land in Darcy Lever In 1632 the mesne tenure had changed and Ellis Crompton after two post mortem inquisitions about John Crompton (his father), held Darcy Lever directly. By 1665, the Bradshaws had taken a considerable parcel of land for their estate. It is not sure how John Bradshaw (died 1662) and his wife, the daughter of Robert Lever, (who had purchased some land from Chisnall) came about the land but it can be assumed that Levers daughter had inherited them and thus they passed to her husband John Bradshaw. However the land came to them, the family estate grew and today they continue to hold large parts of the Bolton area. At this time, 1666, Robert Lever had eight hearths liable to tax, James Bradshaw and John Crompton had seven each and Lawrence Fogg six. The rest of the township was made up of 12 more heaths.

The land-tax return of 1786 shows that James Bradshaw and John Peploe Birch were the chief proprietors of Darcy Lever, between them they paid about half the land tax for Darcy Lever. In 1797 the area had changed hands again and Robert Andrews paid more than a third of the tax with John Fletcher and Benjamin Rawson (who owned the chemical works at Nob End) making up another third between them.

=== Darcy Lever Hall ===
Darcy Lever Hall was owned by James Crompton in 1598 and he partially rebuilt it in 1604. In 1641 Robert and Elizabeth Lever moved into the hall, the date was inscribed with the initials RLE on the stone head of the inner door and on the porch beam. The hall had two storeys with gable attics constructed with a timber frame with plaster fill and a grey slate roof in the Tudor style. It was located on the high ground that slopes down to Blackshaw Brook, which flowed past the south side of the house near the junction with the River Croal. The hall was demolished in 1951.

=== Industry ===
The growth of the textile industry around Darcy Lever was assisted by the availability of coal. By 1896 John Fletcher owned coal mines at Ladyshore, Little Lever; The Earl of Bradford had a coal mine at Great Lever and the Darcy Lever Coal Company and others had mines at Darcy Lever. Darcy Lever had little industry other than the coal mining. Many inhabitants not involved in coal mining found employment on the Manchester, Bolton and Bury Canal or in the textile mills of Bolton and Farnworth. Today, that situation still exists with most of the working population commuting out of Darcy Lever to work in Bolton, Manchester and other nearby towns.

Darcy Lever was not worked for coal as much as nearby Little Lever due to the fact it lay further off the Irwell Valley fault which had uplifted the coal measures making them easier to work. There were several collieries in Darcy Lever, the Darcy Lever Pit, Davenport Pit, Snow Hill Pit, Victoria Pit, Top o'th'Meadows Colliery. In addition closer to Farnworth there was Fogg Pit owned by Andrew Knowles and Sons, near the Bolton and Bury Canal, which was the scene of an explosion which killed 10 miners.

== Governance ==
Darcy Lever was formerly a township, in the ecclesiastical parish of Bolton le Moors in the Salford hundred in the historic county of Lancashire and in 1837 became part of the Bolton Poor Law union. In 1866 Darcy Lever became a separate civil parish, on 30 September 1898 the parish was abolished and merged with Bolton and Darcy Lever was incorporated into the County Borough of Bolton following the Bolton Turton and Westhoughton Extension Act 1898 (61 & 62 Vict. c. ccxlii). In 1891 the parish had a population of 1979.

== Demographics ==
The census of 1821 showed Darcy Lever had a population of 956, by 1871 this had grown to 2,071 people living in 404 houses. In 1901 the population was enumerated with Great Lever. In the 2001 census the populations of Little Lever and Darcy Lever are not separated and given as a total resident population of around 12,000 people and covers an area of 481 hectares. It is home to approximately 6,000 males and 6,000 females, living in approximately 5,000 households.

== General ==
The village has a church, a primary school, a newsagent, a general store and four public houses, the Lever Bridge Inn, the Volunteer (formerly the Artillery & Volunteer), the Farmer's Arms and the Lever's Arms. The village also features two cricket pitches and borders both Moses Gate Country Park and Leverhulme Park. Darcy Lever also has the steepest public highway in Bolton, Gorses Steps. Through the village and park run the remains of the Manchester, Bolton and Bury Canal and the Bolton-Bury/Radcliffe railway line, which had a station which was open between 1848 and 1951. The history and development of Darcy Lever as with its neighbour Little Lever is linked to three families, the Levers, the Cromptons and the Fletchers.

== Religion ==
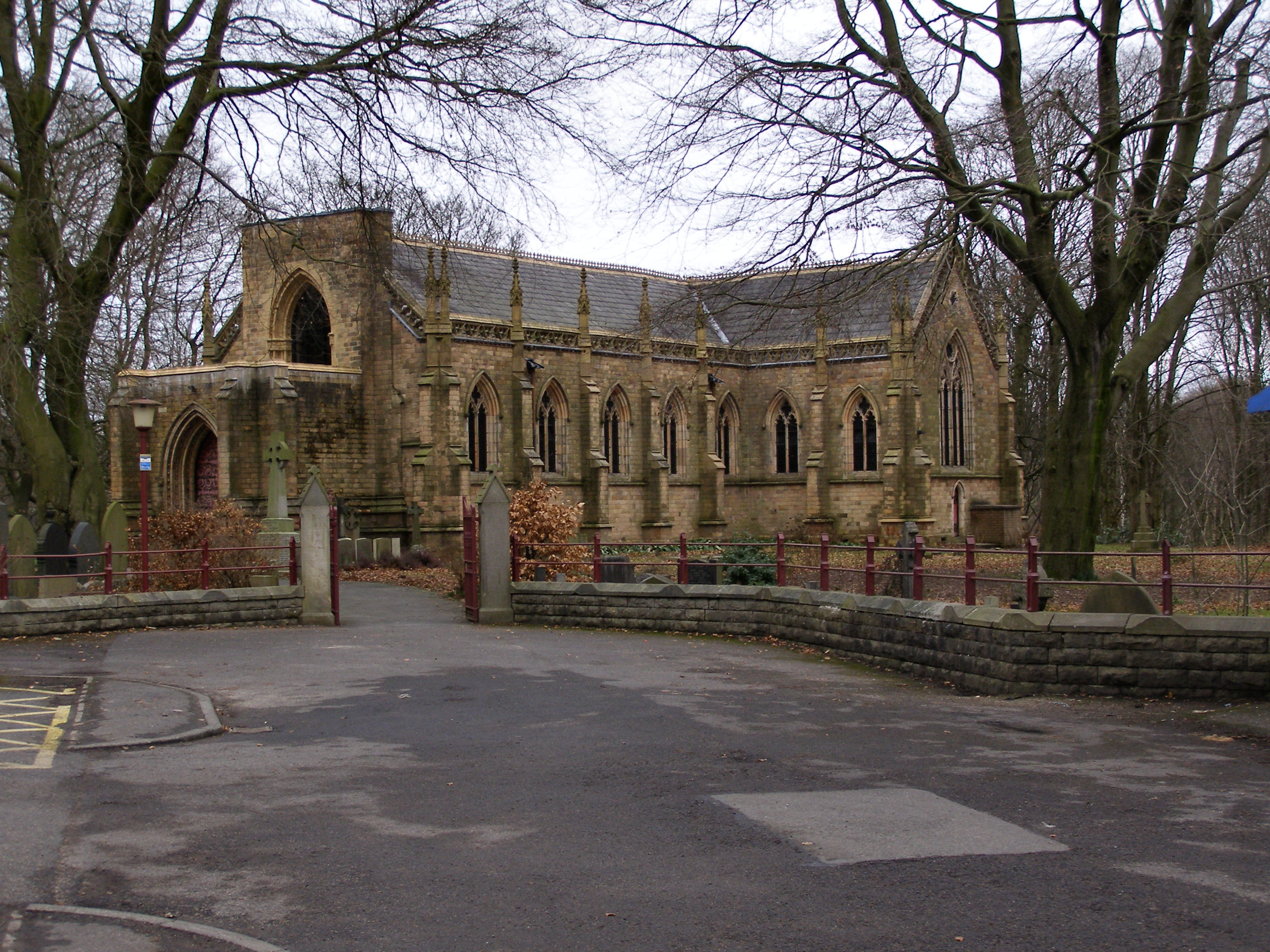
St Stephen and All Martyrs' church

There is 1 church in Darcy Lever St Stephen and All Martyrs' Church, Lever Bridge. St Stephen was founded in 1844 and has a graveyard. There was a church on Banker St, Wesleyan Methodist which was opened for services in 1848. There was a secession between 1882 and 1885. This church has since been demolished.

== Transport ==
=== Railway ===
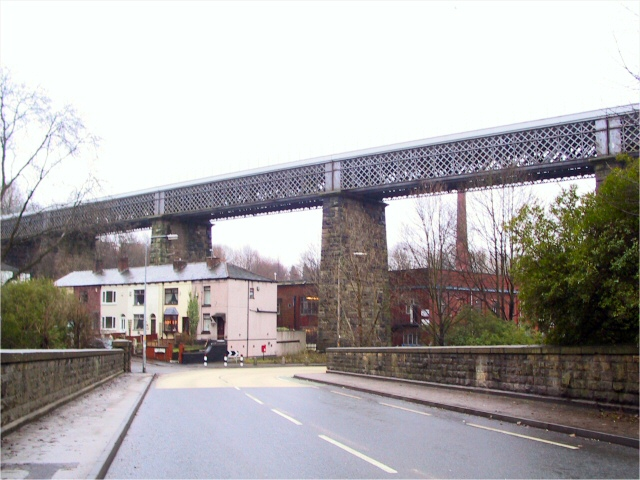
Darcy Lever viaduct, seen from the north-west

The original company operating the line was the Liverpool & Bury Railway, pre-grouping the Lancashire and Yorkshire Railway acquired the line and finally before British Rail, the post-grouping company was the London, Midland and Scottish Railway. The station opened on 20 November 1848. It was on the Bury–Bolton section of the Liverpool & Bury Railway, which opened on the same day.

To the east of the station, the valley of the River Tonge is crossed by Darcy Lever viaduct, which is 86 feet (26 m) high. It comprises a wrought iron structure of eight spans, standing on stone piers and abutments and dating from 1848. Two spans are 54 ft (16 m) long, and six are 84 ft (26 m) long. Each consists of six lattice girders: two 14-foot-deep girders (4.3 m), which also form the parapets, flanking four which are 10 feet (3.0 m) deep. This viaduct, together with a shorter one of similar construction on the same line (over the River Croal at Burnden) was claimed by the Bolton Chronicle (18 November 1848) to be "the first of their kind in England". The station closed on 29 October 1951. The structure was finally designated non-operational in 1983, some thirteen years after the line closed.

=== Canals ===
Six aqueducts were required to allow the Manchester, Bolton and Bury Canal to cross the River Irwell, the River Tonge and four roads. On the Bolton arm these were Hall Lane Aqueduct, Fogg's Aqueduct and the larger Damside Aqueduct. The Damside Aqueduct was demolished in June 1965 for a road and river crossing at Darcy Lever.

Many bridges were constructed along the length of the canal, most were small allowing access to farmland, although many are wide enough for a horse and cart. In places where the canal crossed important thoroughfares, such as Water Street in Radcliffe, Radcliffe Road in Darcy Lever and Agecroft Road in Salford, larger bridges were constructed.

== See also ==
- Great Lever
- Little Lever
- List of mining disasters in Lancashire
