= Quarlton =

Former civil parish in Lancashire, England

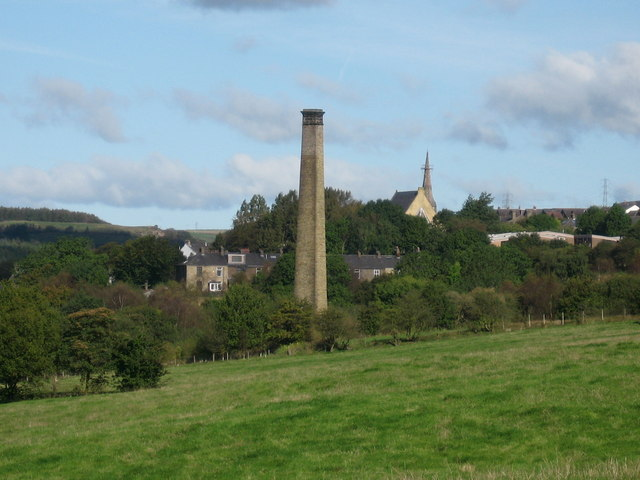
- Area
  - 1891: 798 acres (3.23 km^{2})
- Population
  - 1801: 238
  - 1891: 251
- History
  - Created: Middle Ages
  - Abolished: 1898
- Status: Township (until 1866); Civil parish (1866–1898)

Quarlton was a township of the civil and ecclesiastical parish of Bolton le Moors in the Hundred of Salford, Lancashire, England. It lay 4 1/2 miles (7.2 km) north east of Bolton. In 1891 the parish had a population of 251.

== Toponymy ==
Quarlton is derived from the Old English cweorn and dun meaning the mill hill. A cweorn was a millstone. Quarlton was recorded as Quernedon in 1301, Querndone in 1302; Quordone in 1309 and Quarndon or Quarnton were frequently used until modern times.

== Manor ==
The manor originated as two oxgangs of land in Edgworth which the Radcliffes kept on granting the main portion to the Traffords. Ellis de Quarlton contributed to the subsidy in 1332. Quarlton was held by the Radcliffes of Smithills Hall, and the Bartons, and was sold in 1723 by Lord Fauconberg. The Knights Hospitaller held land in Quarlton from early times, the land was occupied by the Smithills family. Mrs Julia Wright of Macclesfield inherited the manor from her father the Rev. Henry Wright.

Quarlton was a sparsely populated hamlet with few houses. In 1666 no houses had more than two hearths liable to the hearth tax, and the total number of hearths was 21. By the mid 19th century the population was employed in collieries and the Quarlton Vale calico print-works which were established early in the century.

== Governance ==
Quarlton was formerly a township in the parish of Bolton-le-Moors, in 1866 Quarlton became a separate civil parish, on 30 September 1898 the parish was abolished and merged with Edgeworth, and became part of Turton Urban District.

== Geography ==
Quarlton was a boundary township to the north east of the ancient ecclesiastical parish of Bolton le Moors on the slopes of the West Pennine Moors and had an area of 798 acres (3.23 km^{2}) which was mostly moorland and pasture. The hamlet lay at a height of about 650 feet (200 m) above sea level, the ground rises rapidly to the north-east to over 1,250 feet (380 m) at the boundary.

== Demography ==
Year	1801	1811	1821	1831	1841	1851	1861	1871	1881	1891
Population	238	295	320	376	370	361	253	264	271	251
Sources: Local population statistics. Vision of Britain.
