= Sharples School =

Location
- Hill Cot Road; Sharples; Bolton, Greater Manchester, BL1 8SN; England; 53.60733°N 2.42456°W

Information
- Type: Academy
- Established: 1974
- Local authority: Bolton Council
- Department for Education URN: 142232 Tables
- Ofsted: Reports
- Headteacher: Caroline Molyneux
- Gender: Mixed
- Age: 11 to 16
- Website: http://www.sharplesschool.co.uk/

Sharples School is a co-ed secondary school located in the Sharples area of Bolton (North West of Manchester) in the county of Greater Manchester.

Established in 1974, the School celebrated its 40th anniversary in 2014 and its 50th in 2024.

Previously a community school administered by Bolton Metropolitan Borough Council, in June 2016, Sharples School converted to academy status. The school continues to coordinate with Bolton Council after gaining academy status.

Sharples School offers GCSEs, BTECs and the CiDA as programmes of study for pupils. The school also has a specialism in STEM (Science, Technology, Engineering and Maths).

== Notable former pupils ==
- Nicholas Gleaves (born 1969), actor
