= Bolton le Moors =

Parish in Lancashire, England

- Population
  - 1801: 29,826
  - 1881: 124,763
- History
  - Origin: 14th century
- Status: Civil parish (until 1866); Ecclesiastical parish

Bolton le Moors (also known as Bolton le Moors St Peter) was a large civil parish and ecclesiastical parish in hundred of Salford in the historic county of Lancashire, England. It was administered from St Peter's Church, Bolton in the township of Great Bolton.

== History ==
Bolton le Moors was originally a part of the ancient parish of Eccles. In the 14th century it became a parish in its own right. It resembled what is now the town of Bolton and some outskirts. As with many large parishes in the north of England, it was split into townships in 1662 for easier civic administration. Some of the townships had chapels and were known as chapelries.

- Anglezarke
- Blackrod
- Bradshaw
- Breightmet
- Darcy Lever
- Edgworth
- Entwistle
- Great Bolton
- Harwood
- Little Bolton
- Little Lever
- Longworth
- Lostock
- Quarlton
- Rivington
- Sharples
- Tonge with Haulgh
- Turton

For civil purposes, these townships and chapelries were largely autonomous. For ecclesiastical purposes they were presided by and gave an overall precept to the vicar of Bolton. In 1866, the young civil parish (civil parishes in England were set up for almost all parishes from the 1840s to 1860s) was ended; the townships became civil parishes in their own right. These townships, later civil parishes, were used for the censuses until 1891, after which most were absorbed into the County Borough of Bolton or became urban districts. Anglezarke and Rivington became part of the Chorley Rural District.

== Anglican parish ==
The residual ecclesiastical parish exists, being east-central Bolton town centre and a joined-on zone south-west. It is one of the Church of England parishes in the Diocese of Manchester. The parish church is St Peter's Church, Bolton and was rebuilt between 1866 and 1871.

The Reverend Matthew Thompson served from 2008 to 2017 before becoming Dean of Birmingham.

== Notable residents ==
- Thomas Cole (1801–1848), painter and the founder of the Hudson River School.
- John Moran (1830–1902), pioneer artistic photographer.
- Thomas Moran (1837–1926) painter and printmaker of the Hudson River School.

== Demography ==
Total population of the Parish of Bolton le Moors
Year	1801	1811	1821	1831	1841	1851	1861	1871	1881
Population	29,826	39,721	50,197	63,034	73,298	86,660	96,266	110,818	122,248
Sources: Pauline Tatton. Local population statistics 1801-1986. Bolton Central Library Archives. "A vision of Britain through time".

Total population of each of the townships in the Parish of Bolton le Moors
Township	Year and Population									
Township	1801	1811	1821	1831	1841	1851	1861	1871	1881	1891
Anglezarke	162	181	215	168	164	179	134	195	99	92
Blackrod	1,623	2,111	2,436	2,591	2,615	2,509	2,911	3,800	4,234	4,021
Bradshaw	380	582	713	773	827	853	792	870	755	647
Breightmet	734	852	963	1,026	1,309	1,500	1,562	1,500	1,525	1,720
Darcy Lever	589	792	956	1,119	1,700	2,091	2,071	2,048	1,994	1,979
Edgworth	1,003	1,302	1,729	2,168	1,697	1,230	1,350	1,675	1,862	1,861
Entwistle	447	571	677	701	555	486	422	339	341	- - -
Great Bolton	12,549	17,070	22,037	28,299	33,449	39,923	43,435	45,313	45,694	47,067
Harwood	1,281	1,430	1,809	2,011	1,996	2,057	2,055	1,976	1,811	1,564
Little Bolton	4,867	7,099	9,258	12,896	15,707	19,888	24,942	35,013	41,937	44,307
Little Lever	1,276	1,586	1,854	2,231	2,580	3,511	3,890	4,204	4,413	5,168
Longworth	249	226	238	179	149	152	154	113	106	102
Lostock	509	540	576	606	625	620	580	670	782	891
Quarlton	238	295	320	376	370	361	253	264	271	251
Rivington	519	526	583	537	471	412	369	531	330	373
Sharples	873	1,374	2,065	2,589	2,880	3,904	3,294	3,315	3,710	6,981
Tonge with Haulgh	1,158	1,402	1,678	2,201	2,627	2,826	3,539	4,050	6,731	10,735
Turton	1,369	1,782	2,090	2,563	3,577	4,158	4,513	4,942	5,653	11,808
Sources: Pauline Tatton. Local population statistics 1801-1986. Bolton Central Library Archives. "A vision of Britain through time".
