= County Borough of Bolton =

Former local government area in the UK

Coordinates: 53°35′N 2°26′W

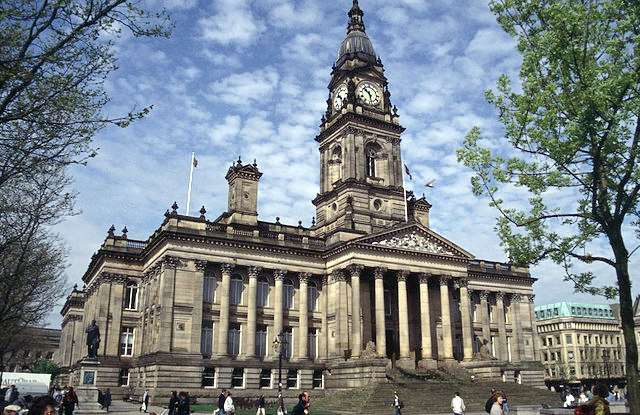
- Bolton Town Hall
- Area
  - 1911: 15,279 acres (61.8 km^{2})
  - 1961: 15,280 acres (61.8 km^{2})
- Population
  - 1891: 146,487
  - 1971: 154,223
- History
  - Created: 1838
  - Abolished: 1974
  - Succeeded by: Metropolitan Borough of Bolton
- Status: Municipal borough (1838–1889); County borough (1889–1974)
- Government
  - HQ: Bolton Town Hall
  - Motto: Latin: Supera Moras (Overcome delays)

Bolton was, from 1838 to 1974, a local government district in the northwest of England conterminate with the town of Bolton.

== History ==
Bolton was created a free borough in 1253 when William de Ferrers, 5th Earl of Derby, granted a charter. However, the borough did not develop into a self-governing town, remaining under the control of officials appointed by the lord of the manor. By the eighteenth century the town was rapidly expanding and the Bolton Improvement Act 1792 (32 Geo. 3. c. 71) established two local government bodies for the area: the Great Bolton Improvement Trustees, and the Police Commissioners for the Township of Little Bolton.

In 1838, under the Municipal Corporations Act 1835, the townships of Great Bolton and Little Bolton, along with the Haulgh area from Tonge with Haulgh township, were incorporated as a municipal borough, making it the second to be created in England (after Devonport). However, there was doubt about the validity of the Charter, with the local Conservatives refusing to stand for the first Council elections, and the magistrates of Salford Hundred disputing the jurisdiction of the new corporation. The first elections to the town council were uncontested, with Whigs and Radicals holding all seats. The council was highly supportive of The People's Charter.

The legality of the charter (as well as those of Devonport, Birmingham and Manchester) was resolved by the Borough Charters Confirmation Act 1842. The act forced the new municipality to compensate the officers of the old corporation. The first contested elections were held in November 1842 and Conservatives gained control in 1844. In 1850 the Borough Corporation took over the Great Bolton and Little Bolton trusts established in 1792.

In 1889, as it had a population in excess of 50,000, Bolton was constituted a county borough by the Local Government Act 1888. As a county borough, Bolton was independent of the administration of Lancashire County Council, although it remained part of the county for judicial, shrievalty and lieutenancy purposes.

In 1974, under the Local Government Act 1972, the County Borough of Bolton was abolished and its territory transferred to Greater Manchester to form part of the Metropolitan Borough of Bolton.

=== Boundaries and wards ===
The original borough was divided into six wards: Bradford, Church, Derby, East, Exchange and West. The borough was extended in 1872, taking in the Daubhill area, which became the seventh ward of Rumworth. In 1873 the number of wards was increased to eight, with the formation of a new North Ward. In 1877 a further enlargement added the ward of Halliwell.

Bolton Turton and Westhoughton Extension Act 1898
- Act of Parliament
- Parliament of the United Kingdom
- Long title: An Act to extend the Borough of Bolton and the Urban Districts of Turton and Westhoughton and for other purposes.
- Citation: 61 & 62 Vict. c. ccxlii

Dates
- Royal assent: 12 August 1898

Text of statute as originally enacted

The Bolton Turton and Westhoughton Extension Act 1898 (61 & 62 Vict. c. ccxlii) allowed the county borough to absorb Astley Bridge Urban District and the bulk of Bolton Rural District (the civil parishes of Breightmet, Darcy Lever, Deane, Great Lever, Heaton, Lostock, Middle Hulton, Smithills and Tonge). The area added to the borough was divided into eight wards (Astley Bridge, Tonge, Darcy Lever-cum-Breightmet, Great Lever, Hulton, Deane-cum-Lostock, Heaton, and Smithills), increasing the total number to seventeen. The Exchange Ward was subsequently abolished and the borough had sixteen wards until its abolition.

=== Political control ===
As noted above, the first elections of the council were uncontested, with Whigs and Radicals forming an administration. Following the entry of Conservative candidates in 1842, they gained a majority in 1844. Until 1887 the only groupings on the council were the majority Conservative and minority Liberal groups, with elections frequently uncontested. The Bolton Engineers' Strike of 1887 led to a highly politicised situation and eight Labour representatives were successful. Three years later the Council returned to two-party politics. There was little change over the next decade, although individual Labour and Home Rule candidates were returned. From the beginning of the twentieth century a Labour grouping began to emerge. By the 1920s Labour had become the second largest party on the council. The Liberals became the third party, while a Women's Citizen Association Councillor sat on the council from 1921 to 1927. In 1933 the Conservatives lost their majority, and the council was under no overall control until 1937. Conservatives regained control in 1937 and held it at the following year's vote. Elections were postponed for the duration of World War II., with the next municipal election being held in 1945. The Labour Party gained 17 seats from both the Conservatives and Liberals, and in 1946 gained control for the first time. The council was then under Labour control until 1949, Conservative from 1949 to 1952 and Labour from 1952 to 1954. After a year under no overall control, Conservatives were in power from 1955 to 1958 and Labour from 1958 to 1961. A Labour-Liberal coalition governed Bolton for two years before Labour regained a majority in 1963 The Conservatives regained the Borough in 1965 and held it for seven years. In 1972, the final election before the Borough's abolition was held, with Labour regaining control.

== Demographics ==
Census populations of the County Borough of Bolton, 1891–1971

Year	Population	±%
1891	146,487	—
1901	168,215	+14.8%
1911	180,851	+7.5%

Year	Population	±%
1921	178,683	−1.2%
1931	177,250	−0.8%
1939	163,823	−7.6%

Year	Population	±%
1951	167,167	+2.0%
1961	160,789	−3.8%
1971	154,223	−4.1%

Sources: Municipal Borough 1891: County Borough 1901–1971:

== Coat of arms ==
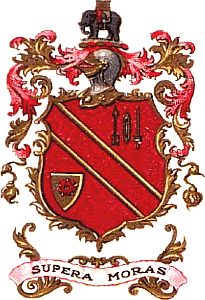
The coat of arms as granted in 1890

A coat of arms was associated with the town prior to the borough's incorporation. This consisted of a shield bearing two bendlets or diagonal bands, variously depicted as gold on red or black on gold. The crest above the shield was an elephant bearing a castle on its back. In 1890 Major Otley Parry redesigned the arms for the borough, the new design being officially granted by letters patent from the College of Arms on 5 June. The blazon of the arms was as follows:

Gules two bendlets or a shuttle with weft pendent between an arrow point upwards and a mule spinning spindle in chief palewise all of the last and an escutcheon in base of the second thereon a rose of the first barbed and seeded proper, and for a Crest: Upon a rocky moor an elephant statant proper on its back a castle Or and thereon a rose as in the Arms the trapping per pale gules and vert and charged with a mitre also Or.

The bendlets do not seem to have had any particular significance: the corporation claimed that they represented a "soldier's belt". This was a common explanation for the heraldic symbol at the time. A number of symbols were added to the arms. In the upper part of the shield was an arrow, recalling that archers from Bolton played a part at the Battle of Flodden in 1513. Next to this were two symbols of the cotton industry: a spindle from Samuel Crompton's spinning mule and a weaver's shuttle. In the lower section of the shield was a gold escutcheon bearing the red rose of Lancaster, denoting that the town was in Lancashire.

The elephant and castle crest of the unofficial arms was retained. The elephant was believed to have been derived from the arms of the City of Coventry, and the green and red colouring of the trappings was taken from the city's arms. The presence of the elephant was explained by the fact that Bolton anciently lay within the Diocese of Mercia, the see of which was at Coventry. The gold mitre in the crest referred to the diocese. The elephant stood on a representation of a "rocky moor": a depiction of the town's old name of Bolton-le-Moors.

In 1958 the corporation received a further grant of supporters and heraldic badge. The additions to the arms were blazoned as follows:

Supporters: On either side a lion sable gorged with a wreath argent and sable each supporting a staff Or flying therefrom a banner that on the dexter vair Or and gules that on the sinister argent on a bend azure three stags' heads caboshed Or; Badge or Device: Upon an oval gules encompassed by a garland of six roses also gules barbed seeded and leaved proper an arrow point upwards enfiled by a crown palisado Or.

The black lions came from the arms of Flanders, in recognition of the fact that Flemish immigrants founded Bolton's textile industry. They supported flags bearing the arms of the two families who held the Earldom of Derby and principal manors of Bolton: the Ferrers and Stanley families.

The motto adopted was Supera Moras or "Overcome Delays". It was a pun on the Latin name of the town: "Bolton-super-Moras".

== Bolton Corporation Transport ==
In 1880 Bolton Corporation began the construction of a network of horse tramways in conjunction with the Councils of the neighbouring urban districts of Astley Bridge, Farnworth and Kearsley. The services were leased to a private operator, and by 1898 had reached 31 miles in length. In 1897 the corporation gained powers to operate the tramways themselves, and began the process of electrification. The corporation officially took over operation on 1 January 1900, with horse traction ending on the following day. Later the same year the tram lines were extended to Horwich. In 1902 the sections in Farnworth and Kearsley were taken over by Farnworth Urban District Council, who passed operation to South Lancashire Transport in 1906. In 1909 Bolton and SLT began a joint-running arrangement with corporation trams reaching Atherton and Leigh as well as Farnworth and Kearsley. The tramways continued to be extended until 1924, and from 1927 Bolton provided some of the trams for South Lancashire's routes.

Bolton first experimented with omnibuses in 1904–1907, with steam and petrol-electric vehicles. Motor bus operation began in 1923. Express services followed in 1927, run jointly with operators such as Manchester and Salford corporations, the Stalybridge, Hyde, Mossley and Dukinfield Transport Board and Lancashire United Transport. The first tramway replacement by buses was in 1933, and the last Bolton tram ran on 29 March 1947. Bolton Corporation continued as a bus-only operation until it was acquired by the SELNEC PTE on 1 November 1969. One Bolton Corporation Transport bus, a 1956 Leyland PD2, is preserved at the Museum of Transport Manchester.

== Utilities ==
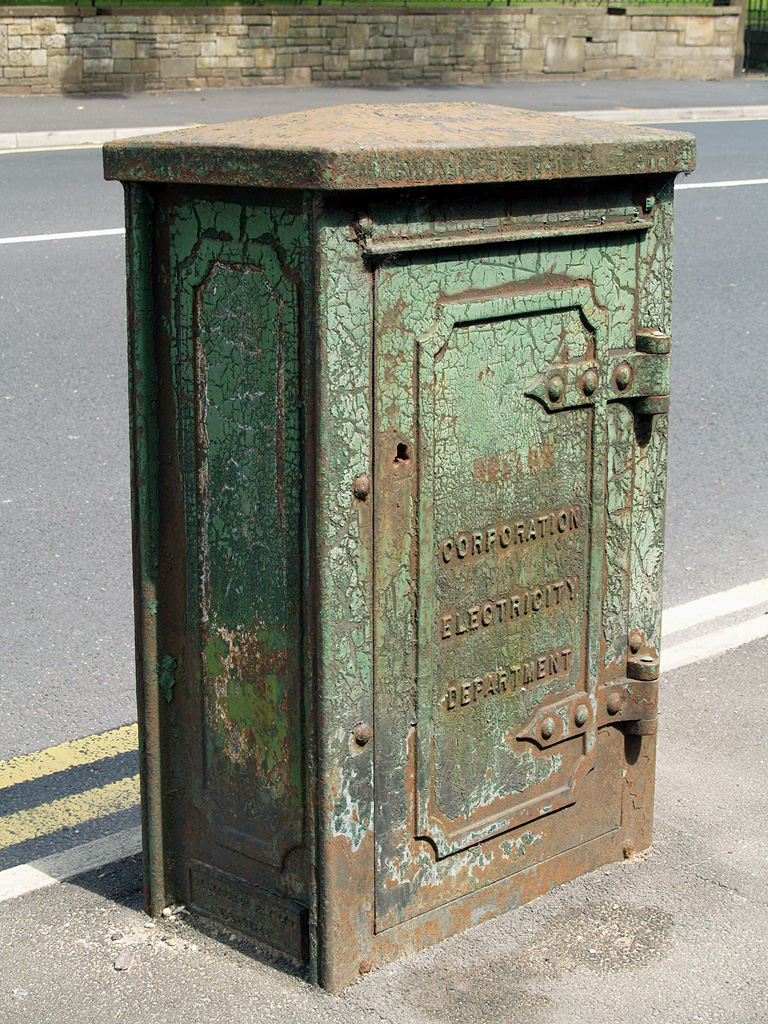
A Corporation Electricity Department box in Bury Road, Breightmet

=== Water supply ===
In 1847 the corporation took over the privately owned waterworks. The main concern of the water undertaking was to secure supplies of water for manufacturing industry, as the existing hard water was damaging boilers. In 1864 they also acquired the Turton and Entwistle Reservoir, contained by the Entwistle Dam for the supply of drinking water. In 1971 the Jumbles Reservoir in the Bradshaw Valley was opened. The County Borough Corporation supplied water to a number of neighbouring authorities including the municipal boroughs of Farnworth, Radcliffe and Swinton and Pendlebury, and the urban districts of Kearsley, Turton, Westhoughton and Worsley Under the Water Act 1973 the undertaking passed to the North West Water Authority.

=== Electricity ===
Electric lighting was introduced by the Corporation in 1894. The original power station, in Spa Road, was found to be inadequate, and a new facility and Back o' th' Bank Power Station came into service in 1914. Under the Electricity Act 1947 the electricity supply and generating industry was nationalised, and Bolton's Electricity Department was merged in North Western Electricity Board.

=== Gas ===
In 1872 the corporation acquired the Bolton Gas Light and Coke Company, which dated from 1818. Taken over were works at Gas Street/Moor Lane and Lum Street, with headquarters at Hotel Street. The Corporation reconstructed the works and built a new facility at Spa Road comprising offices, workshops and testing rooms. In 1949, under the terms of the Gas Act 1948, the undertaking passed to the North Western Gas Board.

== Neighbouring districts ==
The former districts which had surrounded the County Borough of Bolton.

== See also ==
- List of mayors of Bolton
