= Bolton Town Hall =

Municipal building in Greater Manchester, England

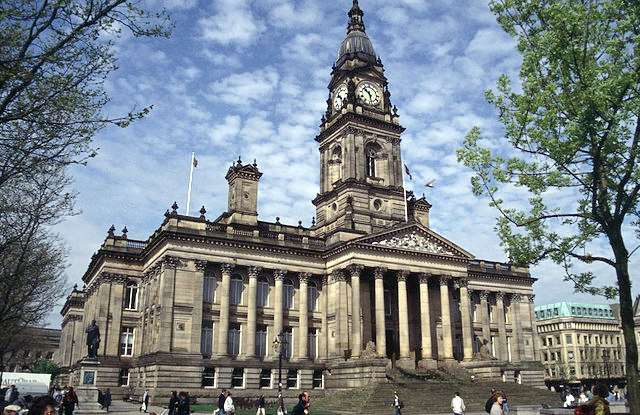
- Bolton Town Hall
- Interactive map of the Bolton Town Hall area

General information
- Architectural style: Neoclassical style
- Location: Bolton, Greater Manchester, England
- Coordinates: 53.578°N 2.430°W
- Year built: 1866–73

Design and construction
- Architect: William Hill
- Designations

Listed Building – Grade II*
- Official name: Town Hall
- Designated: 26 April 1974
- Reference no.: 1388295

Website
- Official website

Bolton Town Hall in Victoria Square, Bolton, Greater Manchester, England, was built between 1866 and 1873 for the County Borough of Bolton to designs by William Hill of Leeds and George Woodhouse of Bolton. The town hall was extended in the 1930s to the designs of Bradshaw, Gass and Hope and has been designated a Grade II* listed building by Historic England.

== History ==
Following the incorporation of Bolton as a municipal borough in 1838, Bolton Corporation decided to use Little Bolton Town Hall as its regular meeting place and it remained so for some 35 years. The current town hall was promoted by the mayor, J. R. Wolfendon, in the early 1860s. The cost was expected to be between £70,000 and £80,000 but more than doubled to £167,000, equivalent to £18.7 million in 2023. Bolton Corporation held a competition for a new town hall design in the 1860s. It was won by a pupil of Cuthbert Brodrick, architect William Hill from Leeds.

For his design of a scaled-down version of Leeds Town Hall, Hill was awarded £120 (equivalent to £13,000 in 2023) for the design, which originally included no tower, but one was added later. During its construction, Hill was assisted by a local architect, George Woodhouse, but the design was entirely Hill's. The final cost of the town hall came to £167,000 (equivalent to £18.7 million in 2023), this being the most expensive town hall built up to that time. It was opened by the Prince of Wales on 4 June 1873.

In the early 1930s, the town hall was extended and a crescent of civic buildings was built to the rear on a new street to provide office space. The extension matches the Victorian building externally, but is plain inside and contains offices. The town hall had a central hall lit by a clerestory that was gutted by fire on 14 November 1981. It was rebuilt as two public halls, the Albert Hall and Festival Hall. The halls are surrounded by an outer ring of offices.

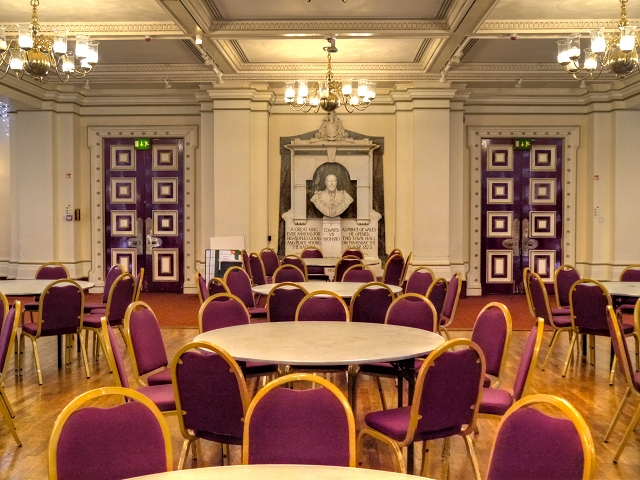
Bolton Festival Hall (dating from the rebuilding after the 1981 fire).

The building served as the headquarters of the County Borough of Bolton for much of the 20th century and remained the local seat of government when the enlarged Bolton Council was formed in 1974.

In 1978, Fred Dibnah made repairs to the clock tower and its 16 stone pillars. Whilst repairing the tower he gilded the sphere at the top.

During the Cold War, the county standby nuclear bunker was located directly below the town hall. It dates to the Second World War and would have been modernised to offer protection from nuclear attack.

== Architecture ==
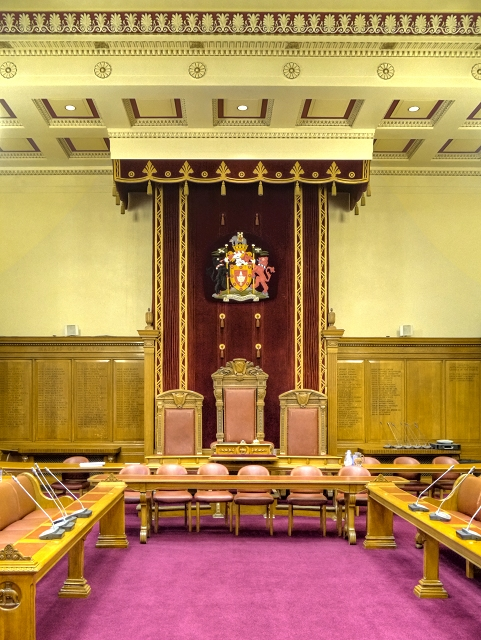
The Council Chamber, Bolton Town Hall.

The original building on a rectangular plan is designed in the neoclassical style in the form of a temple with a tall baroque-style clocktower. The town hall has a high basement storey and two principal floors above in sandstone ashlar which is rusticated at basement level. It has a broad flight of steps up to a five-bay portico with a pediment in which there is a high-relief sculpture by William Calder Marshall, depicting a figure representing 'Bolton' flanked by 'Manufactures' and 'Commerce'. All the other architectural sculpture inside and out is by Burstall and Taylor, including the main staircase, the portico and the lions which flank the steps. Either side of the entrance are five-bay ranges of two storeys with round-arched windows to the first floor.

The tower rises to a total height of 200 feet (61 m). A quarter-chiming clock by Potts of Leeds was installed in the tower in 1871; at the time it was the second-largest clock in Britain after the Great Clock of Westminster. The five bells were cast by Warner & Sons, the hour bell weighing 4 tons 3 cwt.

Internally, as originally constructed, the building was arranged around the central Great Hall, which was 112 feet (34 m) long by 56 feet (17 m) wide; it contained a sizeable organ by Gray and Davison and was designed to seat 1,500 people. There was a Sessions Court to the west; the Council Chamber was on the upper floor to the north and the Mayor's state rooms were on the same floor to the east (including a banqueting room and, directly under the clock tower, a grand reception room). The ground floor had offices and rooms for various officials and users of the court, and to the east the Borough Surveyor and Borough Treasurer's offices. The basement level included a cell block directly below the courtroom, offices and amenities for the police (including a drill-hall directly below the Grand Hall), along with kitchens and storerooms and various civic amenity offices (which could be accessed directly via their own entrances by members of the public).

In 1890, the design for Bolton Town Hall was used again by original architect Hill as the template to build Portsmouth Town Hall, a near identical twin. Though similar in style to that of Bolton, it was conceived on a larger scale. Hill's design for the Portsmouth version added ten domes at its corners to enliven its sky-line. Portsmouth Town Hall was renamed Portsmouth Guildhall in 1926 when Portsmouth was elevated to city status.

== Civic Centre ==
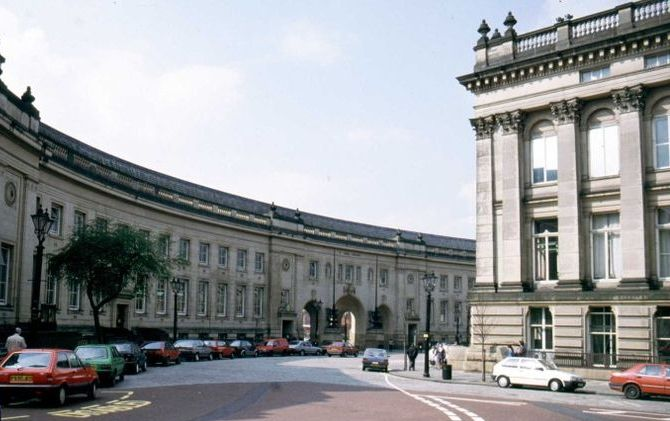
Bolton Civic Centre

The Civic Centre on Le Mans Crescent, housing the Bolton Museum, library, health clinics, and courts, was built in 1932–39 to the designs of Bradshaw, Gass and Hope. Its plan is slightly asymmetric with end pavilions flanking a shallow crescent. There was previously a police station within the northern half of the building adjacent to the magistrates' court. This has been converted to offices although the former cells are still used for holding those facing transfer to prison or awaiting appearances before the court. The building has a steel frame faced in sandstone ashlar with parapets and a slate roof. It has three central arches accessing Cheadle Square. The Civic Buildings are Grade II listed.

== See also ==
- Grade II* listed buildings in Greater Manchester
- Listed buildings in Bolton
