= Halliwell, Greater Manchester =

Coordinates: 53.590°N 2.447°W

Halliwell
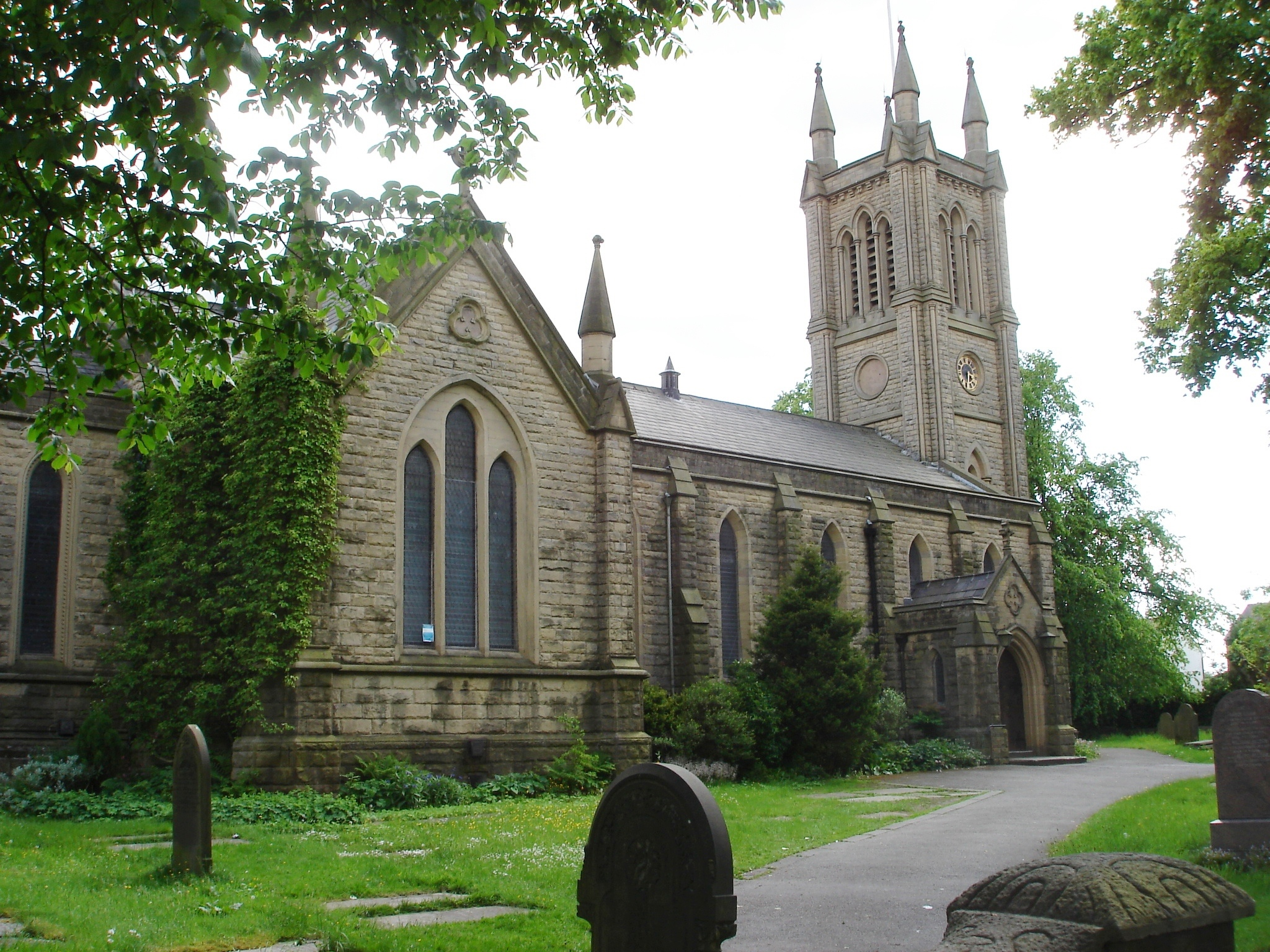
- St Peter's parish church, built in 1838

- Location within Greater Manchester
- Population: 13,929 (2011.ward)
- OS grid reference: SD705105
- Metropolitan borough: Bolton
- Metropolitan county: Greater Manchester
- Region: North West
- Country: England
- Sovereign state: United Kingdom
- Post town: BOLTON
- Postcode district: BL1
- Dialling code: 01204
- Police: Greater Manchester
- Fire: Greater Manchester
- Ambulance: North West
- UK Parliament: Bolton North East

Halliwell is predominantly a residential area of Bolton, Greater Manchester, England. It gives its name to an electoral ward of the wider Metropolitan Borough of Bolton. The population of this ward taken at the 2011 census was 13,929.

== Geography ==
Halliwell lies about 2 miles (3.2 km) to the north west of Bolton town centre and is bounded by Tonge Moor to the east and Heaton to the south west. Smithills Hall to the north is within the ancient township. It lies on the lower south facing slopes of the West Pennine Moors.

== History ==
Historically a part of Lancashire, Halliwell once formed an autonomous township in the ancient parish of Deane. Traces of this ancient history still remain. Boundary Street marks the old boundary between Halliwell and the parish of Bolton le Moors, and a modern wall along Gladstone Street also marks this former boundary. The old building on Halliwell Road, much modernised, at the end of the wall, is the former toll house. In 1891 the civil parish had a population of 16,525. On 30 September 1895 the parish was abolished and merged with Bolton.

== Etymology ==
Halliwell derives its name from the holy well, an ancient spring which used to exist at the northern end of the township off Smithills Croft Road. In Old English it was recorded as halig wella (i.e. holy well). Over the centuries the name has been spelled as Haliwalle (1220), Haliwell (1243), Harywal (1273), and Halewell (1277–8). In Deane Parish Church registers it was spelled Halliwoe and Hollowell.

The parish church of St Peter's was consecrated in 1840.

== Football ==
In the 19th century, Halliwell F.C. was one of the strongest teams in the area, and briefly threatened the local supremacy of Bolton Wanderers. The club played at a ground known as The Bennetts, which was used in summer as a cricket ground. A later non-league club, Bolton St Thomas, played at Holy Harbour, which is now buried under modern housing between Arnold Street, Hughes Street and Cloister Street. The houses are social housing and the landlord is Irwell Valley, they were built in 1998 / 1998. The two new builds on the Holy Harbour land are known as Rusheylea Close and Newlea Close.

== Notable people ==
- Nicholas Gleaves (born 1969), actor

== See also ==
- St Thomas' Church, Halliwell
- St Margaret's Church, Halliwell
