= Hulton =

Hulton may refer to:

== People with the surname ==
- Edward Hulton (1838–1904), British newspaper proprietor and father of Sir Edward Hulton, 1st Baronet
- Sir Edward Hulton, 1st Baronet (1869-1925), British newspaper proprietor and father of Edward George Warris Hulton
- Edward George Warris Hulton (1906–1988), British magazine publisher
- Jim Hulton (born 1969), Canadian ice hockey coach
- William Hulton (1787–1864), English landowner of Hulton Park, Over Hulton, Lancashire
- Hulton Baronets
- Hulton family of Hulton, landowners in Lancashire, England, from late-12th to late-20th centuries.

== Places ==
- Abbey Hulton, a town in Staffordshire, England, historically known as Hulton
- Little Hulton, in Salford, Greater Manchester, England
- Middle Hulton, a former township south-west of Bolton, Greater Manchester, England
- Over Hulton, a suburb of Westhoughton, Greater Manchester, England
