= Hunger Hill, Greater Manchester =

Coordinates: 53.559°N 2.484°W

Hunger Hill
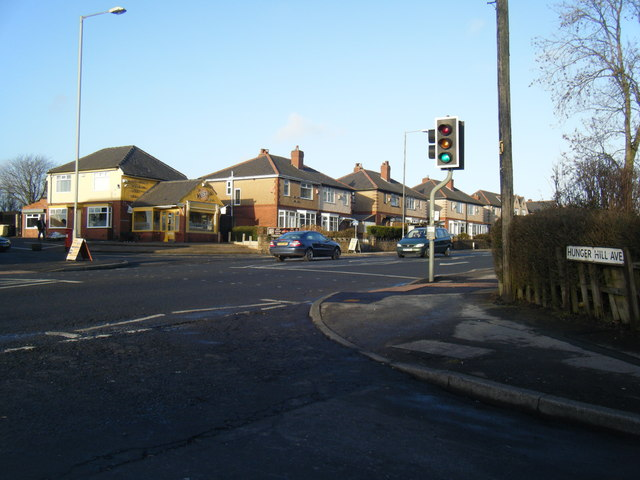

- Location within Greater Manchester
- Area: 0.335 km^{2} (0.129 sq mi)
- Population: 1,317 (2020 estimate)
  - Density: 3,931/km^{2} (10,180/sq mi)
- Metropolitan borough: Bolton
- Metropolitan county: Greater Manchester
- Region: North West
- Country: England
- Sovereign state: United Kingdom
- Police: Greater Manchester
- Fire: Greater Manchester
- Ambulance: North West

Hunger Hill is a settlement in the Bolton district, of Greater Manchester, England. It is about 11 mi (18 km) northwest of Manchester city centre. and had an estimated population of 1,317 in 2020.

== History ==
In the 1800s William Hulton took ownership of Hulton Park.

On the 1 August 1829 the first section of the Bolton to Leigh Railway Line opened, William and his wife Mrs Maria Hulton travelled from Pendlebury Fold to Daubhill.

In 1840 Hulton Brick Works was established at Pendlebury Fold, this site is now Hansons Concrete.

Between 22 and 25 August 1934, Edward Rushton & Kenyon auctioned Hulton Brickworks as an additional item to the Pretoria Pit.

An image from The Bolton News shows a photo of the junction of Lock Lane and Wigan Road. It shows how the old cobbled road looked in 1951 before the motorway was built.

Until 1974 Hunger Hill was part of Westhoughton Urban District; in 1985 a parish called Westhoughton was formed that did not cover Hunger Hill and Over Hulton.

== Toponymy ==
It is uncertain how the settlement came to be named as it is, though there have been several suggestions where the name originated from. An explanation offered during the late 1940s suggested that the name was originally "Hanger Hill", with hanger being an old English term meaning "a wood on the side of a steep hill", relating to the trees that were present in the area. However, in early 2002, this was disputed by a long-term resident, who expressed belief that the name originated from being somewhere where livestock "went hungry" due to inadequate pasture. An editor for The Bolton News tried to verify the statement by the resident, but was unable to do so, believing the explanation offered in the 1940s to be more credible.
