= Wingates Band =

Brass band from Westhoughton, England

- Brass Band
- Former name: Bass Wingates Band, British Aerospace Wingates Band, Wingate's Temperance, Wingates Temperance (Westhoughton), Wingates Temperance Band
- Location: Bolton, Greater Manchester, England
- Music director: Matthew Ryan
- Website: wingatesbrassband.co.uk

Wingates Band is a brass band based in Wingates, a settlement near the town of Westhoughton in north-west England. It is considered one of the country's finest contesting bands and competes in the championship section (top level) of the British brass band league structure.

== History ==
Wingates Band was formed in 1873 by members of the local Independent Methodist church's bible class, in response to a challenge thrown down by the members of the Westhoughton Old Band, which had existed since 1858 reflecting this origin.

The band was originally formed as the Wingates Temperance Band, and has also been the Bass Wingates Band, British Aerospace Wingates Band, Wingate's Temperance, and Wingates Temperance (Westhoughton). Early in the 20th century Wingates rose to become a member of the elite of brass bands. In 1906 it achieved the "double" by winning the British Open brass band championships and the British National championships. The following year, in 1907, the band repeated its success and retained both titles, completing the first "double double" in the British banding world. The feat was not matched for over 70 years. In total Wingates has won the 'Open' seven times and the 'National' on four occasions. The band won the French Open brass band championship in 2004 and 2006.

In May 2008 Peter Moore, a trombonist with the band, won the BBC Young Musician of the Year competition.

== Pretoria Pit Disaster ==
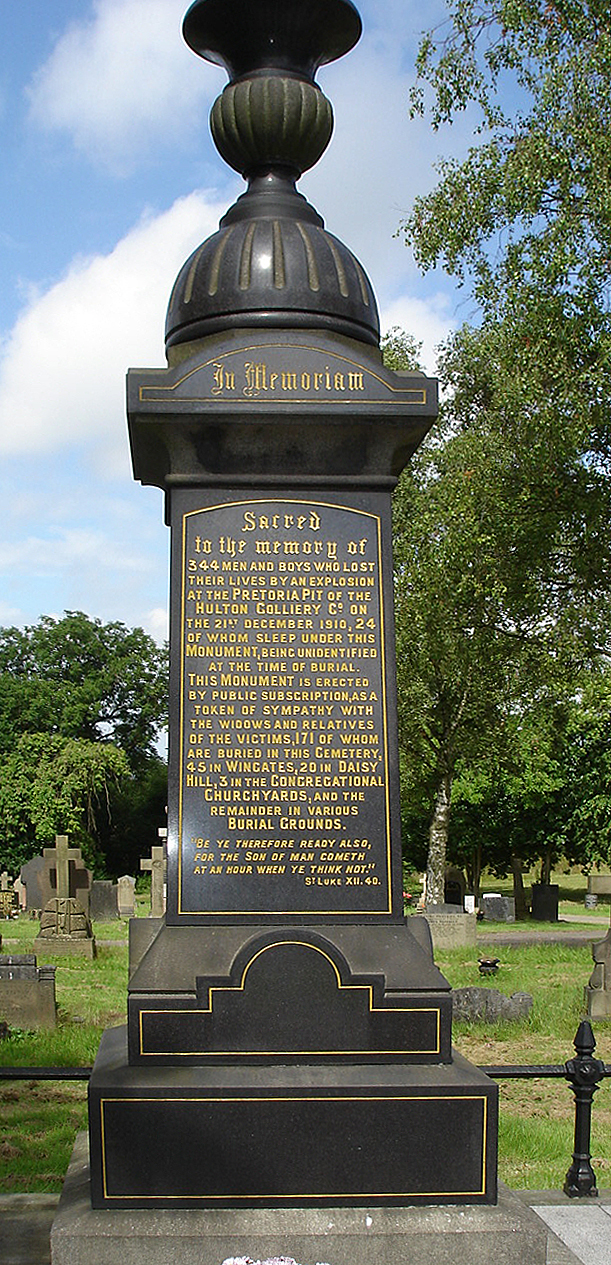
Pretoria Pit Memorial

The Pretoria Pit disaster was a mining accident on 21 December 1910, when an underground explosion occurred at the Hulton Bank Colliery No. 3 Pit, known as the Pretoria Pit, in Over Hulton, Westhoughton, then in the historic county of Lancashire, in North West England. A total of 344 men lost their lives, including cornet players, trombone players and horn players from Wingates Band.

At 7:50 am, there was an explosion in the Plodder Mine, which was thought to have been caused by an accumulation of gas from a roof collapse the previous day.

That day 349 workers descended the No 3 bank pit shaft to work in the Plodder, Yard and Three-Quarters mines. Of those, only four survived to be brought to the surface. One died immediately and one the next day. The two survivors were Joseph Staveley and William Davenport. In addition one man died in the Arley Mine of No. 4 Pit, bringing the total to 344. There was a final fatality that day, William Turton, who died while fighting a fire in No. 3 pit. The men who were working the other mines in the pit worked from No.4 shaft were unharmed.

== William Rimmer ==
It was in 1891 that the band signed its first professional conductor, Mr William Rimmer from Southport. Mr Rimmer was one of the all-time 'giants' of the British band movement. By the turn of the century he had transformed Wingates into an outfit amongst the finest in the land. In 1906 the band achieved the 'double' of British Open and British national Champions. This was repeated in 1907, a feat known as the 'double double' which has only once been emulated since then in the 1970s by the world famous Black Dyke Mills Band.

== Roll of Honour ==
Contest	Place	Year
National Championships of Great Britain	1st	(1906) (1907) (1931) (1971)
	2nd	(1904) (1905)
	3rd	(1900) (1908) (1911) (1921) (1926) (1932) (1976)
British Open	1st	(1906) (1907) (1918) (1921) (1923) (1939) (1975)
	2nd	(1914) (1919) (1920) (1926) (1929) (1935) (1947) (1961) (1968) (1985)
	3rd	(1903) (1930) (1934) (1967)
North West Area Championships	1st	(1945) (1971) (1974) (1977) (1995)
	2nd	(1960) (1963) (1966) (1970) (1976) (1979) (2016)
	3rd	(1947) (1952) (1957) (1959) (1968) (1989) (1994) (2004) (2007) (2015)
French Open	1st	(2004) (2006)
	2nd	(2007)
	3rd	N/A

== Albums ==
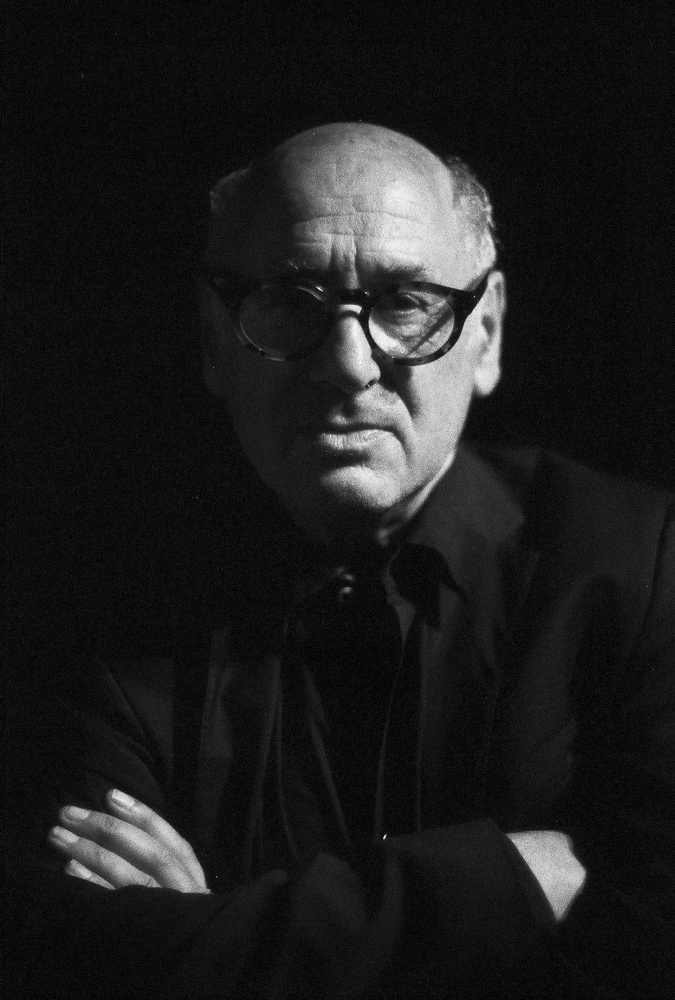
Michael Nyman

Somewhat surprisingly, given the prevailing constraints of the time, the first-ever Wingates gramophone records were made in the summer of 1915, during the dark days of World War I.

Wingates is an active performing band and also has a long recording history. The recent recording Nyman Brass containing arrangements of compositions by the British minimalist composer Michael Nyman. The band recently recorded 5 tracks in BBC Media City philharmonic hall for BBC Radio 2 show listen to the band with Frank Renton to celebrate its 140th anniversary.

Album	Year	Conductor	Details
Marching into the Millennium	(2000)	Alan Lawton	
Milestones	(2001)	Alan Lawton	
The Wonderful World of Wingates	(2003)	Roy Curran & Alan Lawton	
Nyman Brass	(2006)	Andrew Berryman	Composed and produced by Michael Nyman
Sounding Voices, Sounding Brass	(2006)	Russell Paterson & Andrew Berryman	
Asway in A Manger	(2006)	Andrew Berryman	
Frolic For Trombones	(2006)	Andrew Berryman & John Dickinson	Featuring: Halle Trombone section... & Tuba
EXTREMES	(2009)	Andrew Berryman	
Perspectives of Pretoria	(2010)	David Thornton	In memory of the Pretoria Pit disaster
From Fifes to Fanfares & Fame!	(2013)	Paul Andrews	140th Anniversary
Sounds of a Century	(2015)	Paul Andrews	100th Anniversary of recording
