= St James' Church, Daisy Hill =

Coordinates: 53.5346°N 2.5180°W

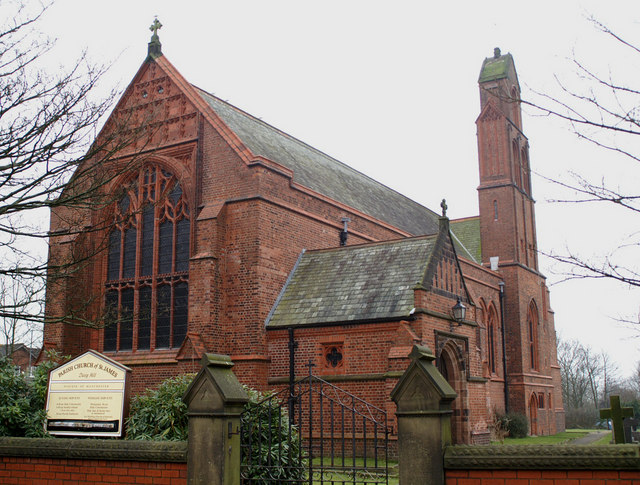
- St James' Church, Daisy Hill, from the southwest

- Location in Greater Manchester
- OS grid reference: SD 658,044
- Location: Daisy Hill, Westhoughton, Bolton, Greater Manchester
- Country: England
- Denomination: Anglican
- Website: St James, Daisy Hill

History
- Status: Church of England
- Founded: 24 February 1879
- Founder: (Westhoughton Mill)
- Dedication: Saint James the Great
- Consecrated: 22 April 1881

Architecture
- Functional status: Active
- Heritage designation: Grade II*
- Designated: 19 August 1986
- Architect: Paley and Austin
- Architectural type: Church
- Style: Gothic Revival
- Groundbreaking: 24 February 1879
- Completed: 1881
- Construction cost: £6,500

Specifications
- Capacity: 410
- Length: 124 feet (37.8 m)
- Materials: Brick with terracotta dressings, slate roofs

Administration
- Province: York
- Diocese: Manchester
- Archdeaconry: Bolton
- Deanery: Bolton
- Parish: St James, Daisy Hill

Clergy
- Rector: Rev Carol Pharaoh
- Priest: (Interregnum)

St James' Church is in the Daisy Hill district of Westhoughton, in the Metropolitan Borough of Bolton, Greater Manchester, England. It is an active Church of England parish church in the Diocese of Manchester and is part of the Bolton deanery and Bolton archdeaconry. The church is recorded in the National Heritage List for England as a designated Grade II* listed building.

== History ==
The church was built between 1879 and 1881, and was designed by the Lancaster architects Paley and Austin. Its cost of £6,500 (equivalent to £680,000 in 2025) was met by two sisters, Mrs Makant and Miss Haddock. The authors of the Buildings of England series state that the church is "a masterly performance for relatively little cash". Building work began on 24 February 1879, when the first sod was turned by Miss Haddock, and the foundation stone was laid by Mrs Makant. The church was consecrated on 22 April 1881 by the Bishop of Manchester. The church provided seating for 410 people. Daisy Hill became a separate parish in 1884.

== Architecture ==
=== Exterior ===
St James' is constructed in brick with terracotta dressings, with a small number of stone dressings. The roofs are slated. Its plan consists of a three-bay nave, a north porch, a chancel, a north transept and vestry, and a bell turret on the south side. All the windows contain Perpendicular-style tracery. The windows along the sides of the church have three lights. The porch is gabled, and has a pointed arch with carvings in the spandrels. At the west end of the church is a five-light window. The transept has a hipped roof, and a projecting entrance also under a hipped roof. There are two-light windows in the organ loft and in the vestry. The east window has six lights, and there are four-light windows in the north and south sides of the chancel. The bell turret is in five stages. The lowest stage contains an entrance with a pointed arch, and round-headed windows. In the second stage is a two-light window, and small windows illuminating the stair contained within the turret. Above this are two bell openings, with a third bell opening above them. At the top of the bell turret is a gable surmounted by a weathercock.

=== Interior ===
Inside the church the brick is bare. The nave has a tie-beam roof, and the chancel has a boarded wagon roof. In the chancel are two sedilia and an aumbry, both in terracotta. The reredos dates from 1924, and is by Shrigley and Hunt. Also in the church is a Pre-Raphaelite painting by Alfred Charles Weatherstone. In the east window is stained glass made by Morris & Co., depicting the Epiphany. In the transept is a stained glass dating from 1943 designed by Edith Norris. The only monument in the church is to the memory of its first vicar, who died in 1911. The three-manual organ was built in 1883 by W. E. Richardson at a cost of about £3,000 (equivalent to £320,000 in 2025).

== See also ==
- Grade II* listed buildings in Greater Manchester
- Listed buildings in Westhoughton
- List of ecclesiastical works by Paley and Austin
