= White Lion, Westhoughton =

Listed pub in Greater Manchester, England

White Lion
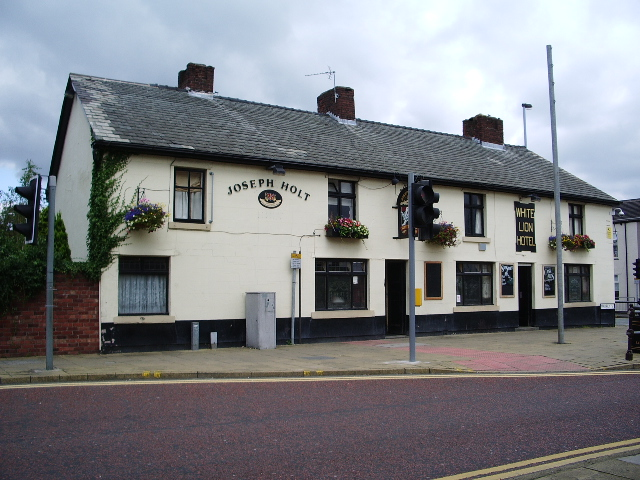
- The pub in 2011

- Location within Greater Manchester
- Alternative names: White Lion Hotel

General information
- Type: Public house
- Location: 2 Market Street, Westhoughton, Greater Manchester, England
- Coordinates: 53.5486°N 2.5199°W
- Year built: Early 19th century
- Renovated: 1920s (altered)

Design and construction
- Designations

Listed Building – Grade II
- Official name: White Lion public house
- Designated: 17 February 2016
- Reference no.: 1429216

Website
- Official website

The White Lion is a Grade II listed public house on Market Street in Westhoughton, a town in the Metropolitan Borough of Bolton, Greater Manchester, England. Built in the early 19th century, it also served as the town's post office. An example of an inter‑war "improved" pub, it largely retains its 1920s interior, which the Campaign for Real Ale regards as being of "outstanding national historic importance".

== History ==
The building was constructed in the early 19th century and has been licensed as a public house since around that time; according to its official listing, it also served at some stage as Westhoughton's post office.

On the 1893 Ordnance Survey map it is marked as the White Lion Inn. In the 1908 edition it is shown adjacent to the town hall, which had opened in 1904.

In 1925 the pub was acquired by Joseph Holt's Brewery. It is an example of an inter‑war "improved" pub, retaining the plan form and interior detail characteristic of the type. Improved pubs were designed to be larger and more comfortable than earlier houses, often including dining rooms, function spaces and gardens, and aimed at attracting a broader range of customers. The interior is included in the Campaign for Real Ale (CAMRA)'s National Inventory of Historic Pub Interiors and, under the organisation's grading scheme, has a three-star rating, denoting "outstanding national historic importance".

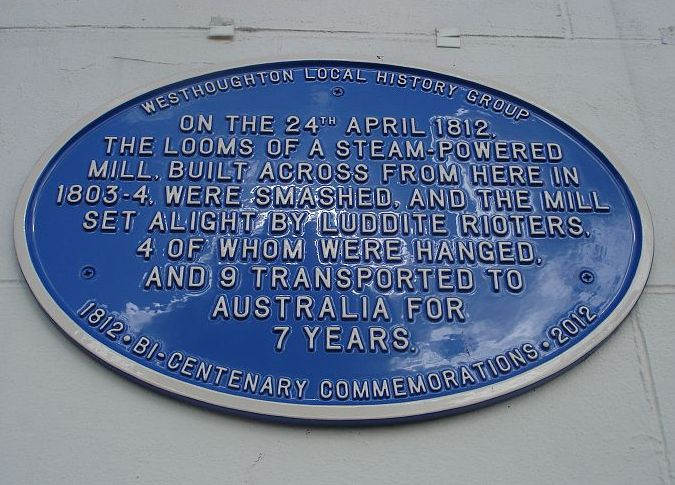
Plaque on the pub near the site of the mill

A plaque installed on the pub in 2012 commemorated the bicentenary of the 1812 Luddite burning of Westhoughton Mill, an event traditionally held to have been planned in the pub.

On 17 February 2016, the White Lion was designated a Grade II listed building. Later that year, Historic England highlighted it in a feature on notable or unexpected buildings that had recently been listed.

In March 2026, the owners submitted plans to Bolton Council for a small rear extension to form a new cellar and for a revised car park layout intended to improve safety at the Market Street junction.

== Architecture ==
=== Exterior ===
The building is constructed in brick with painted, scored render to the front and sides, and a grey slate roof. It has two storeys and four bays in a straight range, with single‑storey rear additions.

The front faces Market Street and has four evenly spaced first‑floor windows. Larger ground‑floor windows sit below, except the left one, which is set further left and mostly boarded. The upper windows are timber casements; those below are fixed timber frames with small leaded panes above and etched glass below. Two timber panelled doors with stone steps stand between the central bays. A raised panel above the right‑hand door carries the name White Lion Hotel, and a painted projecting sign is above the left‑hand door. Chimney stacks rise between the bays, with a wider stack aligned with the fourth. The eaves project with boarded soffits and plastic guttering.

The left gable has painted timber bargeboards and is otherwise plain, apart from a door leading to a lean‑to metal shelter with a glazed roof that spans most of the gable and the short rear outshut.

The rear is built of soft red brick in English garden-wall bond, with some later brickwork and irregular joints. Single‑storey outshuts project at each end, the right a lean‑to and the left gabled.

The right gable also has painted bargeboards. To the right is one window at each floor matching those on the front, and to the left a painted timber sign with a white lion, the brewery crest, and the pub name.

=== Interior ===
A small entrance area opens into a larger central lobby. The main bar stands to the left, enclosed by full etched glass screens with classical‑style posts and a deep cornice. The lobby walls and bar front are finished with 1920s cream and buff tiling with blue‑grey edges and patterned red tiles.

A door from the lobby leads into the long vault, which has the largest stretch of counter and matching curved screens. It contains a 1920s tiled corner fireplace with a lion‑head surround. A disused central entrance lobby survives nearby. At the west end, a corridor links to the outdoor area and a former room with an Edwardian fireplace, and also connects to the snug behind the bar. The snug has another curved counter section, a fireplace, and tiled panels including a rural scene. Opposite is an opened‑up darts area, and to the right the "John Hyde Suite".

Most rooms retain fixed seating and bell pushes for table service, which continued into the 1970s. Original doors have etched glass and Art Nouveau fittings, and embossed ceiling paper survives. A polished metal water heater sits on the bar.

Tiled finishes continue up the stair to the manager's accommodation, where rooms borrow light from the stair window through part‑glazed internal openings. Fireplaces and other period features remain. The modern glazed shelter on the west gable is not included in the listing.

== See also ==
- Listed buildings in Westhoughton
- Listed pubs in Greater Manchester
