= Daisy Hill, Greater Manchester =

Coordinates: 53.5356°N 2.5222°W

Daisy Hill
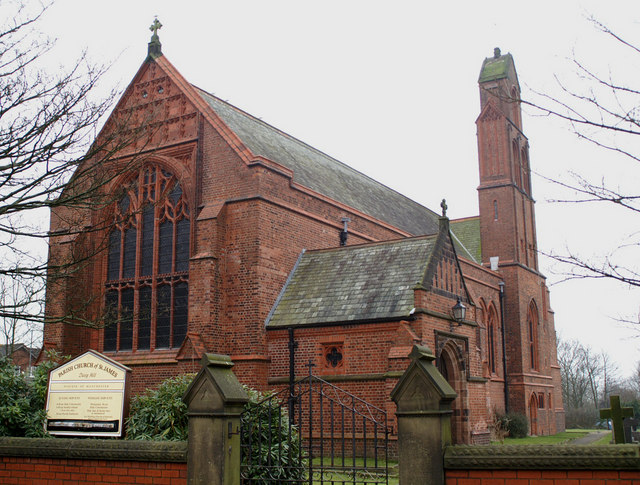
- St James' Church

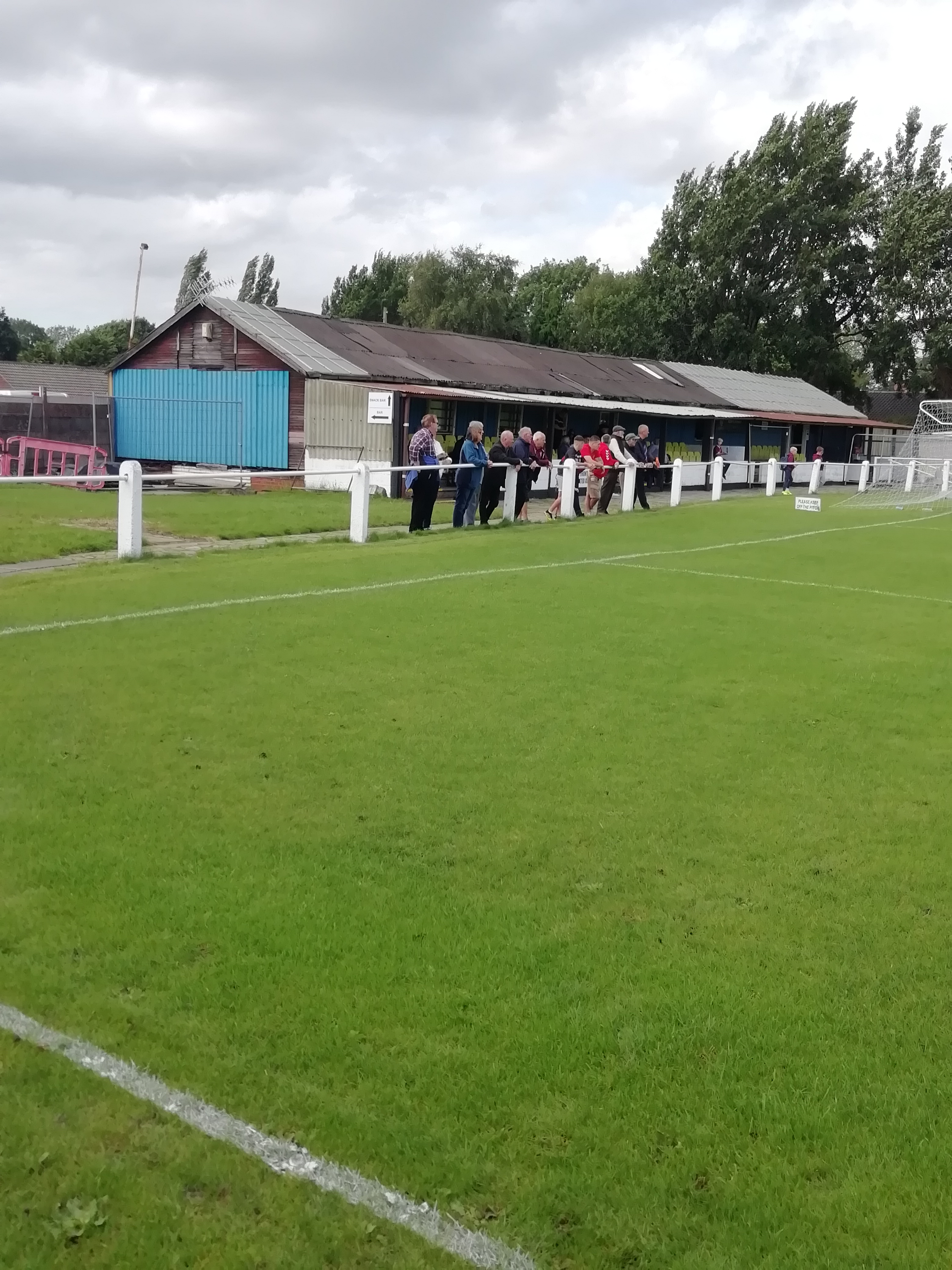
- Daisy Hill F.C. Clubhouse, changing rooms and seating.

- Location within Greater Manchester
- Civil parish: Westhoughton
- Metropolitan borough: Bolton
- Metropolitan county: Greater Manchester
- Region: North West
- Country: England
- Sovereign state: United Kingdom
- Police: Greater Manchester
- Fire: Greater Manchester
- Ambulance: North West

Daisy Hill is a suburban area in the town and civil parish of Westhoughton within the Metropolitan Borough of Bolton in Greater Manchester (historically Lancashire), England. The area is served by Daisy Hill railway station. It falls under the BL5 postcode district. It has a church called St James' Church.

== Sport ==
Daisy Hill is home to non-league, semi-professional football club Daisy Hill F.C. The club grew in popularity on social media when online content creator and Bolton native Aaron Hunt made a series of videos on YouTube about becoming the chairman of the club. The club are based on St James Street. Since 2025 the ground has been known as The Ginge Power Stadium, due to sponsorship from another popular content creator and television personality, Angryginge. From the start of the 2026/2027 season, Bolton Wanderers Women also play their home games at the stadium.
