= Listed buildings in Westhoughton =

Westhoughton is a civil parish in the Metropolitan Borough of Bolton, Greater Manchester, England. It includes the town of Westhoughton and the settlements of Wingates, White Horse, Four Gates, Chequerbent, Hunger Hill, Snydale, Hart Common, Marsh Brook, Daisy Hill and Dobb Brow. The area contains ten listed buildings that are recorded in the National Heritage List for England. Of these, one is listed at Grade II*, the middle of the three grades, and the others are at Grade II, the lowest grade. The listed buildings include churches and items in churchyards, memorials, a dovecote, a public house, a school, and houses later used as offices.

== Key ==
Grade	Criteria
II*	Particularly important buildings of more than special interest
II	Buildings of national importance and special interest

== Buildings ==
Name and location	Photograph	Date	Notes	Grade
Sundial; 53.54910°N 2.52632°W	—	1735	The sundial was in the churchyard of St Bartholomew's Church. It is in stone and consists of three square steps, a baluster and a square cap. On the top was a brass plate and gnomon. It was stolen in 1992.	II
Dovecote, Hulton Hall; 53.54340°N 2.48561°W	—	Early 19th century	The dovecote of the demolished hall is in red brick with a hipped grey slate roof. It has an octagonal plan, and on the roof is a lantern with a conical slate roof. The dovecote has a plain entrance and two circular openings on the sides, and inside are nesting boxes.	II
White Lion public house 53.54859°N 2.51992°W		Early 19th century	The public house, which was altered in the 1920s, is in brick, mainly rendered, with a grey slate roof. There are two storeys, four bays, and rear single-storey outshuts. The windows on the upper floor are casements, and on the ground floor they are fixed. Many of the internal features have been retained.	II
Church of St John the Evangelist; 53.56169°N 2.52694°W		1858–59	The church is in stone with a slate roof, and consists of a nave, a north porch, a chancel, and a north vestry. On the west gable is a bellcote.	II
110 and 112 Market Street; 53.54902°N 2.52548°W		c. 1860	A pair of houses, later offices, in brick on a stone plinth, with stucco dressings, a top cornice, and a hipped slate roof. There are two storeys, and each house has three bays. In each central bay is a doorway with a segmental head, an inset Doric doorcase, and a fanlight. The windows are sashes with wedge lintels, and on the left side is a two-storey canted bay window.	II
Westhoughton Church of England Primary School; 53.54893°N 2.52669°W		1861	The school, which is in Gothic style, is in brick with stone dressings and a slate roof with coped gables. There is one storey, eight bays, and lean-to extensions on the sides. The fifth bay is larger and gabled, and contains a five-light window with a hood mould, the other windows having three lights. In the fourth bay is a plain entrance, and there are more entrances in the extensions with segmental heads and hood moulds.	II
Tower of St Bartholomew's Church; 53.54922°N 2.52615°W		1869–70	The rest of the church was destroyed by fire in 1990, and the tower stands detached from the new church. It is in stone, with four stages, and is in Gothic style. The tower has buttresses rising to gabled niches in the second stage, a stair turret at the southeast corner ending in a pinnacle above the rest of the tower, and clock faces. At the top is a corbel table, a cornice, and an embattled parapet.	II
St James' Church, Daisy Hill; 53.53466°N 2.51788°W		1879–1881	The church, by Austin and Paley, is in brick and terracotta with some stone dressings and a slate roof. It consists of a nave, a north porch, a chancel, a north transept, organ chamber and vestry, and a south bell turret. The nave has a sill course, a top cornice and a parapet, and the windows contain Perpendicular tracery. The large bell turret has three stages, a gabled roof, and a weathercock.	II*
Pretoria Mine Monument; 53.54998°N 2.52730°W		1911	The monument commemorates the Pretoria Pit disaster when 344 coal miners were lost. It has a square granite base, a marble plinth, and an inscribed pedestal. On the cap is a small cupola and a large urn decorated with flowers.	II
War memorial 53.54898°N 2.52575°W		1923	The war memorial stands at a road junction in an enclosure approached by steps, and with a rear wall. It is in stone, and consists of a cross fleury with a moulded foot on a tapering octagonal shaft. This is on an octagonal plinth on a three-stepped base. There are inscriptions of the front of the shaft, and on the front face of the plinth, with the names of those lost in the First World War on the other faces. In the central block of the rear wall is an inscription and the names of those lost in the Second World War and since.	II
