= Lawson baronets of Knavesmire Lodge (1905) =

Escutcheon of the Lawson baronets of Knavesmire Lodge

The Lawson baronetcy, of Knavesmire Lodge in the City of York, was created in the Baronetage of the United Kingdom on 26 December 1905 for the politician John Lawson. The title became extinct on the death of the 2nd Baronet in 1973.

== Lawson baronets, of Knavesmire Lodge (1905) ==
- Sir John Grant Lawson, 1st Baronet (1856–1919)
- Sir Peter Grant Lawson, 2nd Baronet (1903–1973). He died leaving no heir.

== Notes ==
Baronetage of the United Kingdom
Preceded by Hulton baronets	Lawson baronets of Knavesmire Lodge; 26 December 1905	Succeeded by Ley baronets
