= Hulton family of Hulton =

English landowning family

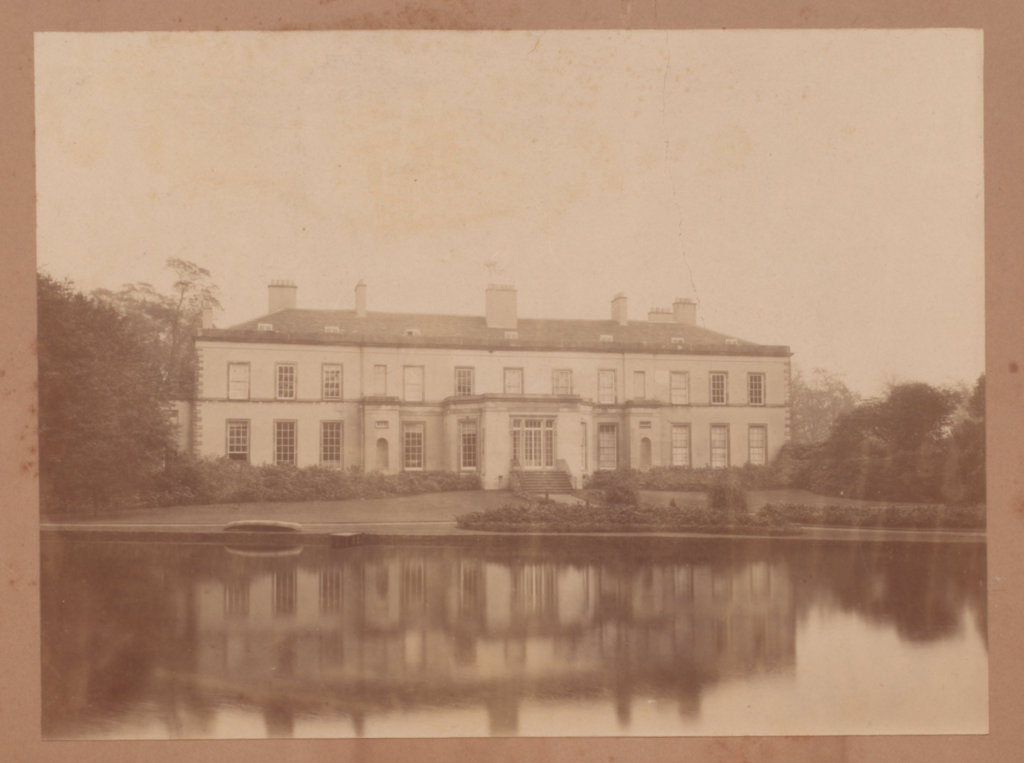
Hulton Hall c 1870

The Hulton family of Hulton lived and owned land in Lancashire for more than eight hundred years from the late-12th to the late-20th centuries. The family took its name from the three townships surrounding their Hulton Park Estate, Over, Middle and Little Hulton.

== Origins ==
The first family members to live in Lancashire were Iorwerth and Madoc the sons of Bleiddyn who left North Wales in about 1167 after Owain Gwynedd expelled Norman and English settlers. Iorwerth, was granted by charter the town of Pendleton by King John in 1199. The family expanded its influence and in 1304 Richard de Hulton held parts of Hulton, Ordsall, Flixton and Heaton. He built the first Hulton Hall, establishing the family seat in Hulton Park which covered 325 acres of parkland approximately five kilometres south-west of Bolton. Richard's grandson, also Richard squandered much of the family's estate and died in poverty without an heir.

== 15th-17th centuries ==
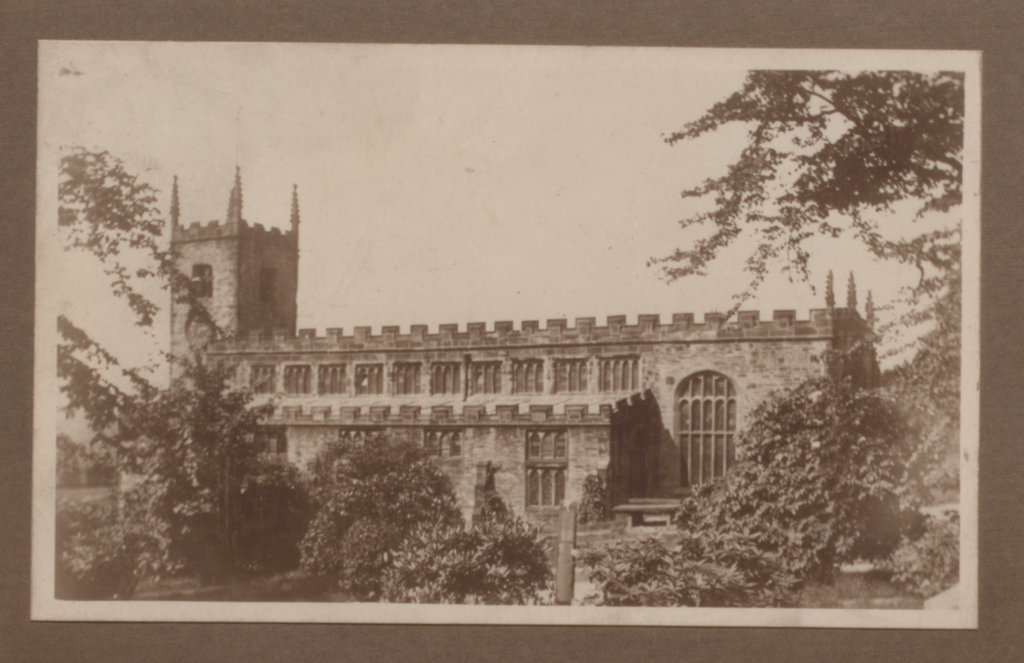
St. Mary's Church, Deane

The Hultons regained and expanded their estate spent during the 15th and 16th centuries often through marriage. In 1485 a marriage was arranged between the infants, Adam Hulton and Alice Hulton, daughter of John Hulton of Farnworth. In 1521, Henry VIII arbitrated a dispute that arose between the two branches of the family, ruling that lands in Westhoughton, Harpurhey, Denton, Openshaw and Gorton should be assigned to Adam and Alice's male heirs. From this time this branch of the Hultons became much more prominent than their namesakes in Farnworth.

The Hultons worshipped at Deane Church and some are buried in its Hulton Chapel. They were devout Catholics, and, in common with many Lancastrians, kept the old faith during the Reformation but remained allied to the sovereign. William Hulton joined the association of Lancashire magistrates committed to defending Elizabeth I in the Anglo-Spanish War in 1585. His successor and grandson, Adam Hulton converted to Protestantism, and developed connections with Puritan families in the area. The family was involved in the Civil War of 1642–51 when Adam summoned his tenants to Parliament's cause and may have taken an active role in the conflict. A letter addressed to George Rigby of Peel, Clerk of the Peace for Lancashire in January 1643 relates that Rigby's brother-in-law, 'Captaine Hilton', was kept prisoner in Chester Castle after acting as a captain in the Parliamentary army. 'Captaine Hilton' could be Adam or his brother Edward.

== 17th-19th centuries ==
Adam's son, William, inherited the estate as the Hulton's wealth and influence was increasing. He represented Clitheroe in the Convention Parliament of 1660 that invited Charles II to return to the throne, and was the only family member to sit in the House of Commons. He built the second Hulton Hall.

The Hultons occupied positions of political influence during the 18th and 19th centuries. From 1767–75, Henry Hulton of the Hampshire branch of the family was the First Commissioner of Customs in the American Colonies in Boston and responsible for collecting taxes levied on the American population which they denounced as 'taxation without representation'. Hulton was reviled and attacked and at the onset of the American Revolution returned to England in 1776.

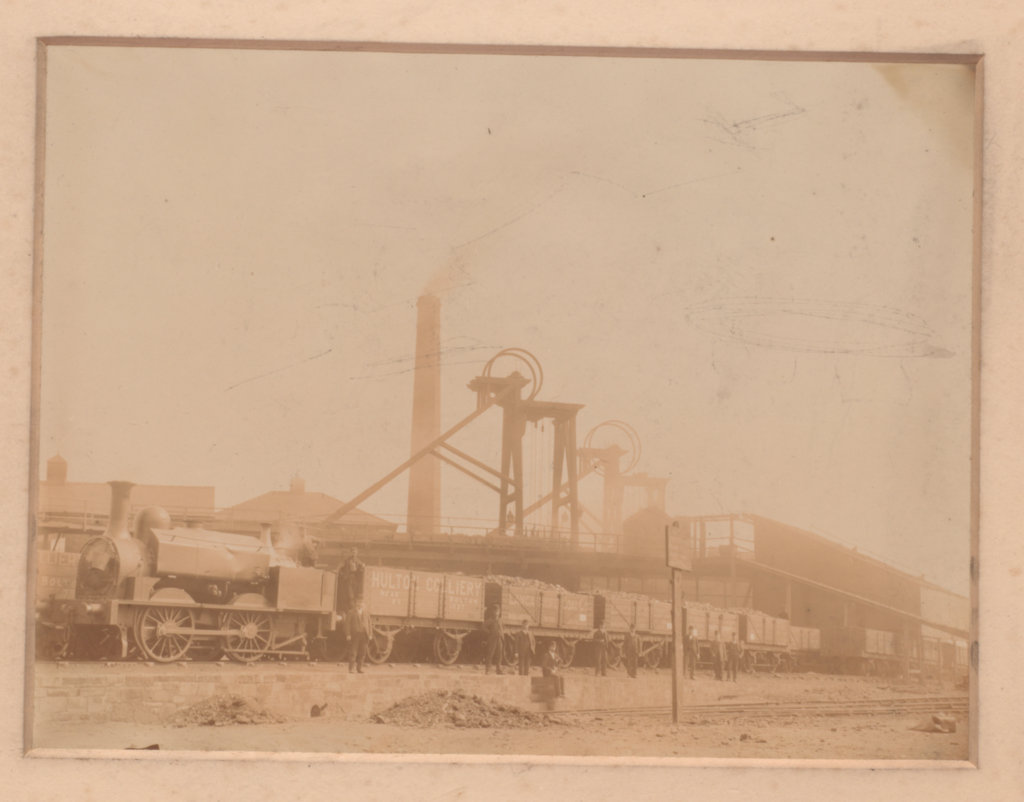
Chequerbent Colliery c 1909

William Hulton was appointed High Sheriff of Lancashire in 1811. After a cotton mill in Westhoughton was torched by Luddites in 1812, Hulton ordered the execution of four of the suspects, one of them reported to be twelve years old. Hulton was a magistrate who dealt harshly with the working-class crime and social unrest. On 16 August 1819. 60,000 pro-democracy reformers gathered in St Peter's Field in Manchester to listen to the radical orator, Henry Hunt. Hulton, chairman of the Lancashire and Cheshire magistrates, a body set up to deal with the growing problem of civil unrest was in Manchester to ensure order was maintained. Observing from a nearby house, Hulton issued an arrest warrant for Hunt and his associates, but was advised that military assistance was required. He called on the local yeomanry to arrest the radicals and disperse the meeting. The yeomanry attacked the crowd indiscriminately. It is estimated that 18 were killed and 600 to 700 injured. The event became known as the 'Peterloo Massacre'. Home Secretary Lord Sidmouth conveyed King George III's 'great satisfaction' at Hulton's 'prompt, decisive and efficient measures', but among the working classes he was known as 'old Peterloo', his reputation was forever sullied. In 1820 he turned down a Tory seat in Parliament, while in 1841 Hulton and his family were attacked in Bolton during an election campaign demonstrating how the massacre had influenced public opinion.

=== Coal ===
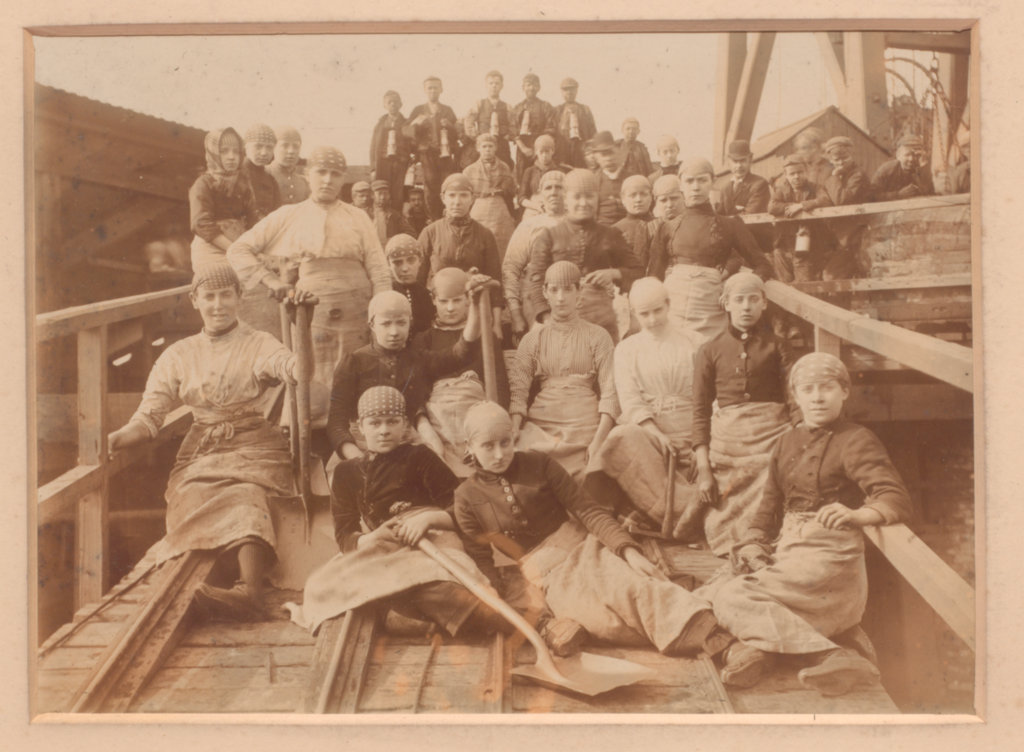
Pit brow workers at Chequerbent Colliery

The Hultons accrued much wealth from the coal under their estate. It was mined from the 1550s, but its worth became clear as industrialisation took hold in the late-18th and early-19th centuries. William Hulton, who inherited the family estate in 1800, was responsible for the major developments that exploited the coal reserves in Hulton Park. He was a principal supporter of the Bolton and Leigh Railway, which transported the Hulton's coal to markets in Bolton, Manchester and Liverpool. The railway pioneer, George Stephenson, stayed at Hulton Hall for three months while overseeing the railway's construction. The line was opened for traffic on 1 August 1828, with 40,000 people in attendance to witness what the Bolton Chronicle described as an 'interesting and novel spectacle'. The Bolton and Leigh Railway was the first railway line to operate in Lancashire. In 1858, William Hulton founded the Hulton Colliery Company in partnership with Harwood Walcot Banner. Their partnership was dissolved ten years later and from 1868 onwards the company traded under the Hulton name. The Hultons gave up control of the coal mines in 1886 after the Hulton Colliery Company was founded. In December 1910 a defective safety lamp caused an explosion in the Pretoria Pit killing 344 men and boys. It was the worst coal mining disaster in Lancashire, and the third worst in Britain. By 1947, the Hulton coal empire could claim to be the largest in Lancashire, but it gradually diminished in the second half of the 20th century due to a nationwide fall in demand.

== 19th-20th century ==
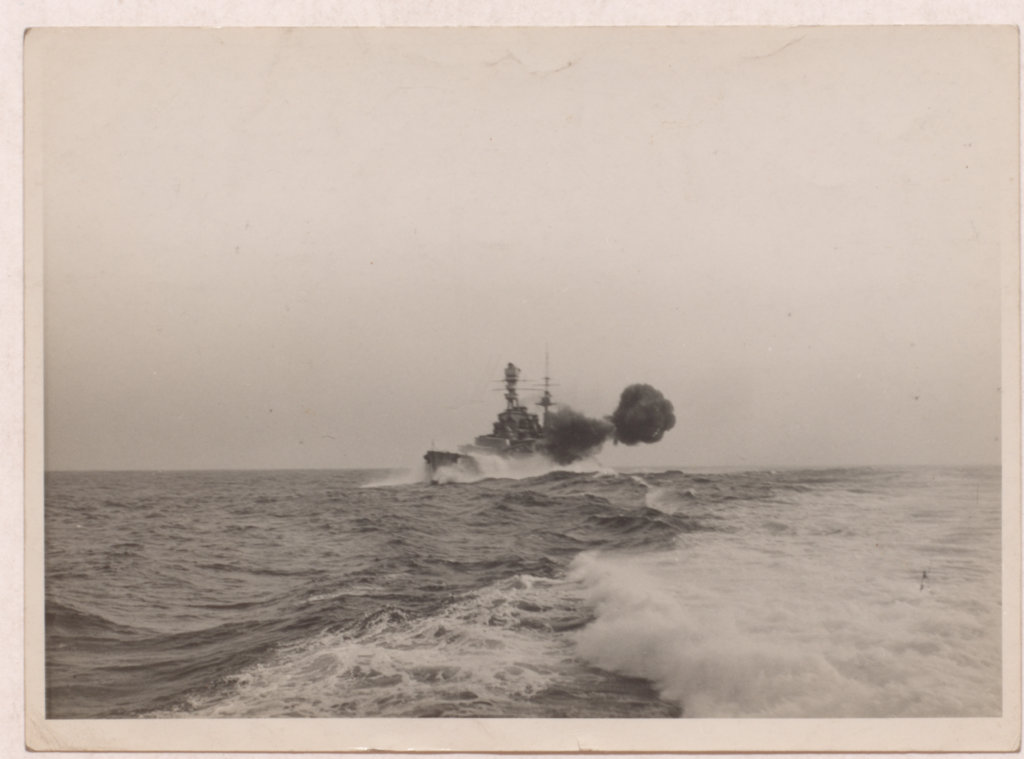
HMS Repulse

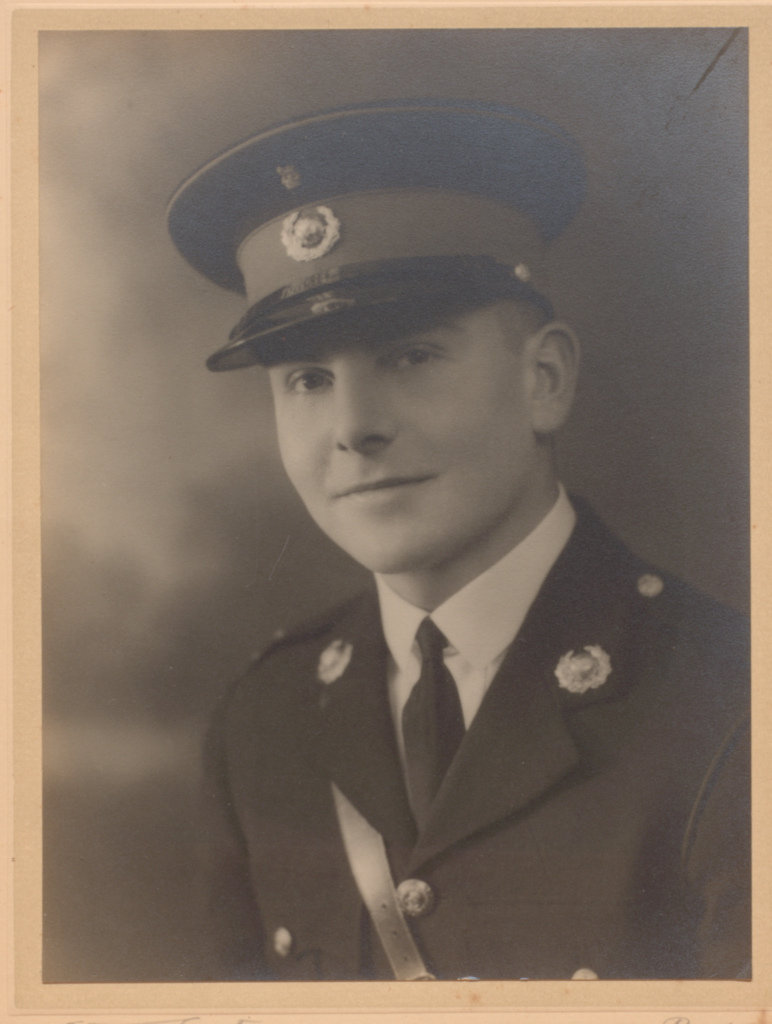
Geoffrey Hulton, officer in Royal Navy Marines

In the late-19th and 20th centuries the Hulton family fortunes gradually declined. However, in 1902 William Wilbraham Blethyn Hulton was made a baronet for services to Lancashire. The second baronet, Sir William Rothwell Hulton, was the last patriarch to live in Hulton Hall before moving into an estate cottage towards the end of the First World War. Hulton Hall fell into a state of disrepair before being demolished in 1958.

The fourth and last baronet, Sir Geoffrey Alan Hulton served as an officer in the Royal Navy Marines on board HMS Repulse during the Second World War. He was held prisoner by the Japanese for three and a half years, during which he 'lived in the depths of squalor'. Geoffrey Hulton's death without heir in 1993 signalled the end of the Hulton dynasty.

== 20th-21st century ==
Descendants of the Hulton dynasty can be found throughout the world. Some remain in the United Kingdom while other, by way of migration have resettled throughout the commonwealth, most prominently in Australia and New Zealand.

Thomas Henry Hulton served the New Zealand Army Corps in the First World War, while his children; Henry Hulton, Fergus Hulton and Douglas William Hulton served in the Second World War. Fergus Hulton, serving the Royal New Zealand Air Force, died in a mid-air collision over the town of Wooler.

Thomas Henry Hulton's grave can be found in an above ground tomb outside St Faith's Church near Te Papaiouru Marae in Rotorua, New Zealand.

== See also ==
- Hulton Baronets

== Notes ==
=== References ===
- Croston, James (1887). County Families of Lancashire and Cheshire. Manchester and London: John Heywood.
