= Westhoughton Town Hall =

Municipal building in Westhoughton, Greater Manchester, England

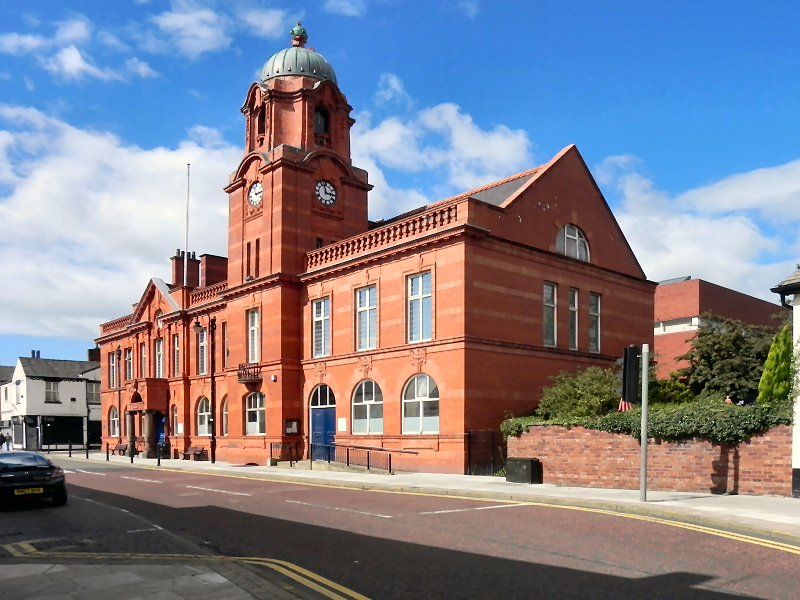
- Westhoughton Town Hall

- Shown in Greater Manchester
- 53.5488°N 2.5205°W
- Location: Market Street, Westhoughton

History
- Built: 1904

Site notes
- Architect: Bradshaw and Gass
- Architectural style: Renaissance style

Westhoughton Town Hall is a municipal building in Market Street, Westhoughton, Greater Manchester, England. The town hall is the meeting place of Westhoughton Town Council.

== History ==
The local board of health, which was formed in 1872, initially established its offices at the junction of Market Street and Wigan Road. After significant industrial growth, particularly associated with the number of cotton mills in the town, the area became an urban district in 1894. In this context, civic leaders decided to procure a dedicated town hall: the site they selected had been open land on the north side of Market Street just south of Glebe Mill.

Foundation stones for the new building were laid by the chairman of Westhoughton Urban District Council, W. E. Tonge, and by the senior member, Roger Walker, on 18 April 1903. It was designed by Bradshaw and Gass in the Renaissance style, built with terracotta facings from Ruabon in Wales at a cost of £4,922 and was officially opened on 7 December 1904. The design involved an asymmetrical main frontage with eleven bays facing onto Market Street; the central part of the left-hand section, which slightly projected forward, featured a porch with a pair of Ionic order columns supporting an entablature with a date stone and a carved cornice; there was a casement window on the first floor and an open pediment containing an oculus above. The fourth bay from the right featured an iron balcony on the first floor and a clock tower with an octagonal bell turret and dome above, containing an hour-striking clock by John Smith & Sons of Derby. Internally, the principal room was the council chamber.

A Carnegie library was erected behind the town hall and opened on 24 March 1906. A plaque to commemorate the lives of some of the 344 men and boys who had died in the Pretoria Pit disaster was commissioned by the Bolton & District Cricket Association and fixed at the south west corner of the town hall following the tragedy which took place on 21 December 1910. The bell was removed from the bell turret, as it was causing damage to the terracotta facings, in 1947.

The building continued to serve as a meeting place for Westhoughton Urban District Council for much of the 20th century but ceased to be the local seat of government after the enlarged Bolton Metropolitan Borough Council was formed in 1974. The town hall was restored to a municipal role when it became the meeting place of Westhoughton Town Council when it was established in 1985. A plaque to commemorate the life of the locally-born actor, Robert Shaw, was unveiled by the mayor, Councillor Brian Clare, outside the town hall on 3 August 1996.

A proposed programme of refurbishment works costing £2.5 million, to be carried out to a design by Good and Tillotson, was announced by Bolton Council in May 2018. However, although the building was fully vacated in March 2020, Bolton Council announced in June 2020 that the works would not proceed until wider plans for the regeneration of the town centre had been considered and approved.

The building could become a listed building after inspectors from Historic England carried out an inspection on 20 June 2023.
