= Hulton baronets of Hulton Park (1905) =

Escutcheon of the Hulton baronets of Hulton Park

The Hulton baronetcy, of Hulton Park in the parish of Deane and County Palatine of Durham, was created in the Baronetage of the United Kingdom on 23 December 1905 for the colliery owner and politician William Hulton, of the landowning Hulton family of Hulton), in honour of his services to local affairs in Lancashire.

The title became extinct on the death of the 4th Baronet in 1993.

== Hulton baronets, of Hulton Park (1905) ==
- Sir William Wilbraham Blethyn Hulton, 1st Baronet (1844–1907)
- Sir William Rothwell Hulton, 2nd Baronet (1868–1943)
- Sir Roger Bradyll Hulton, 3rd Baronet (1891–1956)
- Sir Geoffrey Alan Hulton, 4th Baronet (1920–1993)

== Notes ==
Baronetage of the United Kingdom
Preceded by Hogg baronets	Hulton baronets of Hulton Park; 23 December 1905	Succeeded by Lawson baronets
