= Ley baronets of Epperstone Manor (1905) =

Escutcheon of the Ley baronets of Epperstone Manor

The Ley baronetcy, of Epperstone Manor in the parish of Epperstone in the County of Nottingham, was created in the Baronetage of the United Kingdom on 27 December 1905 for the industrialist and promoter of sports Francis Ley. He was the founder of Ley's Malleable Castings Vulcan Ironworks in Derby and also served as High Sheriff of Nottinghamshire in 1905. The family surname is pronounced "Lee".

== Ley baronets, of Epperstone Manor (1905) ==
- Sir Francis Ley, 1st Baronet (1846–1916)
- Sir Henry Gordon Ley, 2nd Baronet (1874–1944)
- Sir Gerald Gordon Ley, 3rd Baronet (1902–1980)
- Sir Francis Douglas Ley, 4th Baronet (1907–1995)
- Sir Ian Francis Ley, 5th Baronet (1934–2017)
- Sir Christopher Ian Ley, 6th Baronet (born 1962)

== Notes ==
Baronetage of the United Kingdom
Preceded by Lawson baronets	Ley baronets of Epperstone Manor; 27 December 1905	Succeeded by Mackworth-Praed baronets
