= Hulton Colliery Company =

Defunct English coal mining company

The Hulton Colliery Company was a coal mining company operating on the Lancashire Coalfield from the mid 19th century in Over Hulton and Westhoughton, then in the historic county of Lancashire, England. The company had its origins in small coal mines on the northern part of the Hulton Park estate in 1571 owned by the Hultons who had held the estate from medieval times.

== Background ==
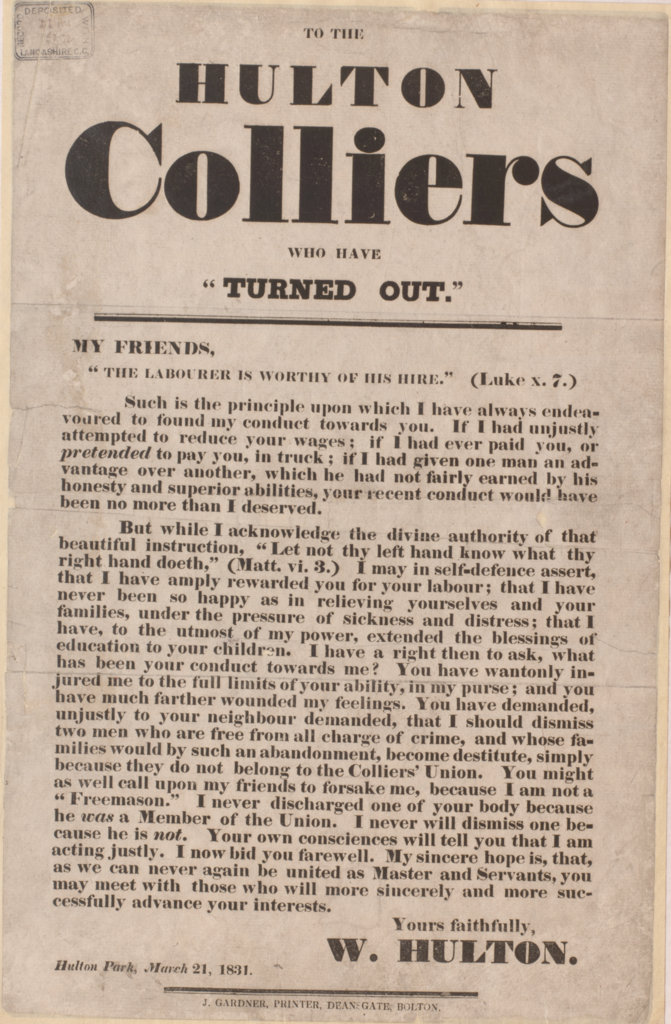
'To The Hulton Colliers who have "Turned Out"'

In the early 19th century the mines were owned by William Hulton who was High Sheriff of Lancashire in 1811 and in 1812 sentenced four men, including a 12-year-old boy, to be executed for their part in a Luddite attack on Westhoughton Mill. His orders led to the Peterloo Massacre in 1819. In 1843 Hulton paid his colliers the poorest wages in Lancashire. He remained opposed to permitting the right to free assembly and was vehemently opposed to miners congregating with the object of forming a union.

Hulton's pits thrived and in the 1820s were connected to the Bolton and Leigh Railway. By 1840 there were pits situated to the north of the Manchester to Preston road (A6) and west of the Bolton to Leigh road (A579) and Hulton Lane.

== Company ==
Hulton established the Hulton Colliery Company in 1858 with a partner, Harwood Walcot Banner. After Hulton's death in 1864 his son, William F. Hulton succeeded him and became the sole owner in 1868 when the partnership was dissolved. The company sank pits near Chequerbent. The Arley Pits and the School Pit were sunk north of the Manchester road and older workings were abandoned. The new pits were linked to the Bolton and Leigh Railway line at Pendlebury Fold where the company built brickworks.

William Ford Hulton died in 1879 and was succeeded by William W. B. Hulton who sold his mining rights to the Hulton Colliery Company Ltd. The company expanded, and sank the shafts for Chequerbent Colliery to the east of the railway line and south of the Manchester road in 1892. The shafts of Hulton Colliery's Bank Pit Nos 1&2, the Klondike Pit, were sunk in 1897 south of Chequerbent Colliery and Bank Pit Nos 3&4 shafts, the Pretoria Pit, were sunk between 1900 and 1901 close to the Atherton boundary towards the south-west corner of the estate.

== See also ==
- List of mining disasters in Lancashire
- Glossary of coal mining terminology
