= Middle Hulton =

Village in England, United Kingdom

Coordinates: 53.54°N 2.45°W

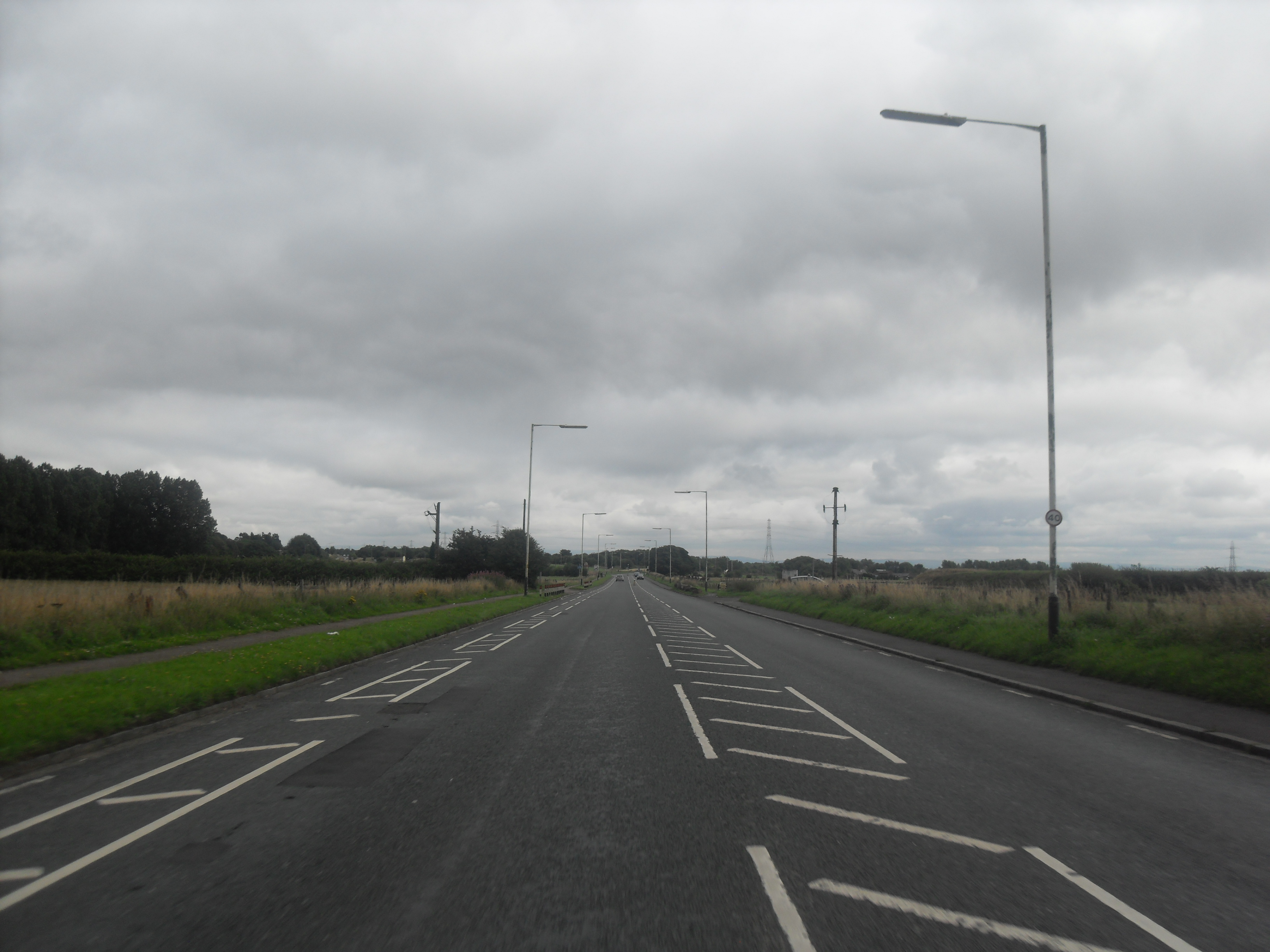
- Area
  - 1891: 1,517 acres (6.14 km^{2})
- Population
  - 1801: 819
  - 1891: 2,703
- History
  - Created: Middle Ages
  - Abolished: 1898
- Status: Township (until 1866), Civil parish (1866–1898)

Middle Hulton was a township of the civil and ecclesiastical parish of Deane in the Salford hundred of Lancashire, England. It was located 3.5 miles (5.6 km) south-west of Bolton. In 1891 the parish had a population of 2703.

== History ==
The ancient district of Hulton contained three townships, Over Hulton, Middle Hulton and Little Hulton. It was recorded as Helghtun and Hulton in 1235, Hilton in 1278 and 1292 and Hulton in 1292, although Hilton was still used until the 17th century. The chief manor was held by the Hultons at Hulton Park in Over Hulton.

Land belonging to the Hultons was sold to the Earl of Ellesmere. There were coal mines and quarries in the 19th century. It was near the Bolton and Leigh Railway.

In 1866 Middle Hulton became a separate civil parish, on 30 September 1898 the parish was abolished and merged with Bolton.

=== Cutacre ===
The Cutacre site was granted planning permission in 2001 for the surface mining of 900,000 tonnes of coal and reworking of the spoil tip. The operation was expected to last for 4 years and began in 2006. The restoration scheme would create over 100 hectares of amenity woodland and wetlands as well as for an area of industrial development. UK Coal is currently working with Bolton Metropolitan Borough Council to promote the Cutacre site through the Local Development Framework process. Bolton Council have identified Cutacre as a key strategic site for future development in Bolton and consequently plans have changed. There has been a long campaign against the proposals by residents in Over Hulton and Little Hulton.

== Geography ==
The former township was situated on the road from Manchester to Preston, now the A6 road. There was no village centre; the most built-up area was in the northern part of the township at Daubhill. It comprises 1,280 acres (5.2 km^{2}) of flat land, mostly of meadow and pasture, the remainder arable. The underlying rocks are Coal Measures; there is also cannel coal and there is a sandstone quarry. The M61 motorway crosses the former township.

== Demography ==
Year	1801	1811	1821	1831	1841	1851	1861	1871	1881	1891
Population	819	900	938	934	902	888	790	911	2,051	2,703
Sources: Local population statistics. Vision of Britain.
