= Hulton baronets =

Set index for Shelley baronets

There have been two baronetcies created for persons with the surname Hulton, both in the Baronetage of the United Kingdom. Both are extinct.

- Hulton baronets of Hulton Park (1905)
- Hulton baronets of Downside (1921): see Sir Edward Hulton, 1st Baronet (1860–1925)
