= William Hulton =

William Hulton (23 October 1787 – 30 March 1864) was an English landowner, magistrate and collier who lived at Hulton Park, in the historic county of Lancashire, England. The Hultons owned the estate since the late-12th century.

== Biography ==
William Hulton was the son of William Hulton and Jane (née Brooke). He was educated at Brasenose College, Oxford. In 1808 he married his cousin Maria Ford with whom he had 13 children, 10 of whom survived to maturity.

In 1811 he was appointed High Sheriff of Lancashire. In this capacity he ordered the arrest of 12 men, Luddites, for arson at Westhoughton Mill in Westhoughton town centre. Four of the offenders were hanged outside Lancaster Castle, including a boy aged 12. Hulton gained a reputation as being tough on crime and political dissent and in 1819 was made chairman of the Lancashire and Cheshire Magistrates, a body set up for dealing with the civil unrest endemic in the area. He was also Constable of Lancaster Castle.

In 1819 he summoned the local Yeomanry to deal with a large crowd in St Peter's Square in Manchester which had gathered to hear the political agitator Henry Hunt. The Yeomanry, on horseback with sabres drawn, forced its way through the crowd to break up the rally and allow Hunt to be arrested. From his vantage point William Hulton perceived the unfolding events as an assault on the yeomanry, and on L'Estrange's arrival at 1:50 pm, at the head of his hussars, he ordered them into the field to disperse the crowd with the words: "Good God, Sir, don't you see they are attacking the Yeomanry; disperse the meeting!" Fifteen people died from sabre and musket wounds or trampling, with 400 to 500 injured and the event became known as the Peterloo Massacre. Hulton was vilified by the local population and was obliged to decline a safe parliamentary seat offered to him in 1820. He remained a believer in what he called 'stern unbending politics', and fainted in despair when told the Duke of Wellington was considering Catholic Emancipation.

He died at Leamington Priors, Warwickshire on 30 March 1864, and was buried in St Mary the Virgin's Churchyard, Deane, Lancashire on 5 April 1864.

== Coal ==
As the owner of Hulton Park he derived income from the seven collieries working the coal measures under the park and nearby, and in 1824 became chairman of the Bolton and Leigh Railway Company, which planned and built the first public railway in Lancashire. The line ran to the west of his estate from Bolton to the Leeds and Liverpool Canal in Leigh, enabling him to deliver his coal to market more cheaply. The line was connected to the Liverpool and Manchester Railway in 1830 giving him and other local businessmen access to the Port of Liverpool.

Until 1831 Hulton paid his workers with tokens or vouchers that could only be redeemed in his company shop, a practice outlawed by the passing of the Truck Act 1831. In 1843 Hulton paid his colliers the poorest wages in Lancashire. He remained opposed to permitting the right to free assembly and was vehemently opposed to miners congregating with the object of forming a union. He established the Hulton Colliery Company in 1858.

== Family ==
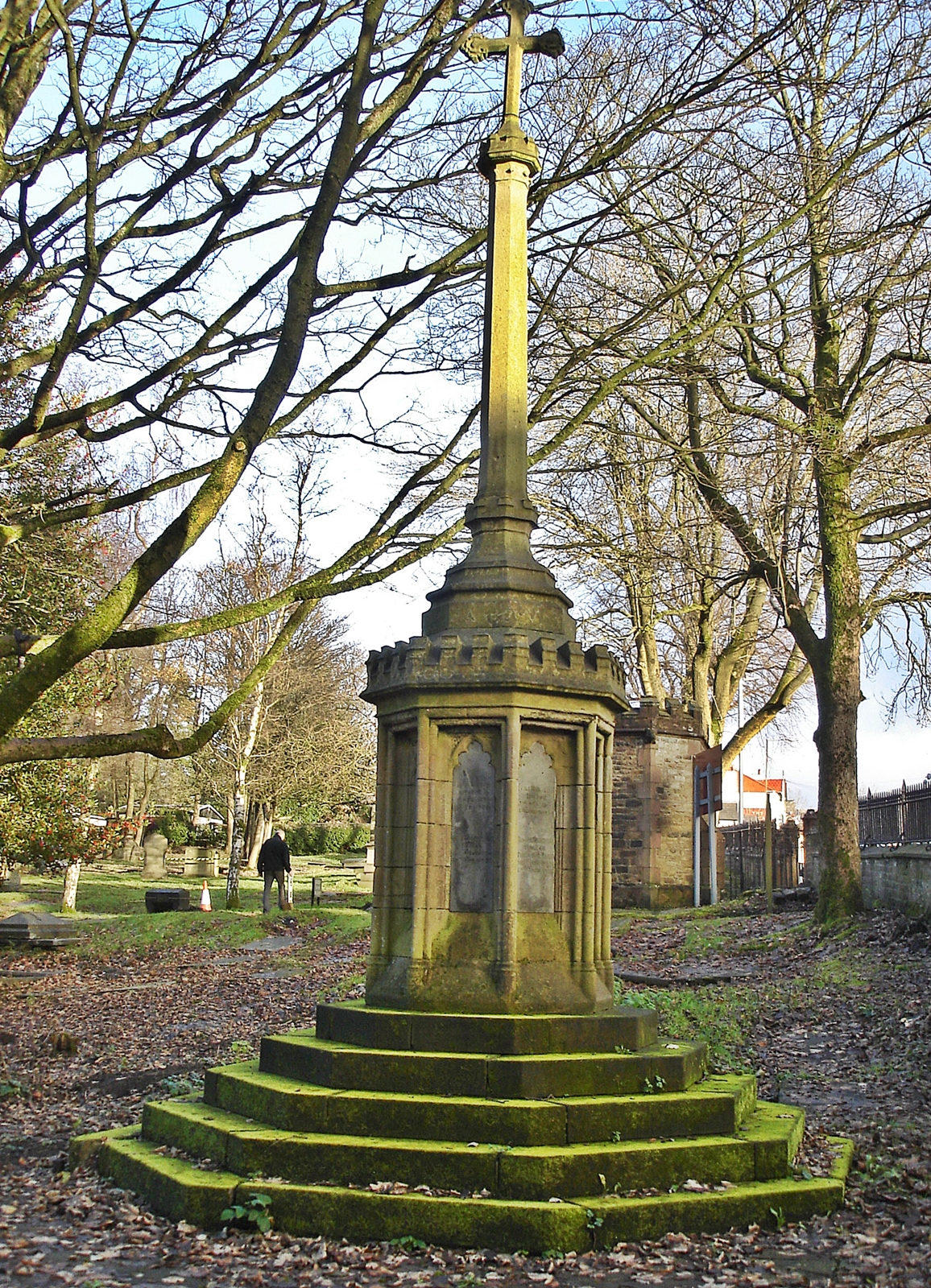
Hulton family grave, Deane churchyard

William and Maria had at least 8 sons and 4 daughters who survived infancy:

1. William Ford Hulton, b. 19 September 1811 – d. 18 May 1879
2. Amelia Marie Hulton, b. 1815 – d. 5 February 1871, who married Henry Montagu Villiers, later Bishop of Durham
3. Arthur Hyde Hulton, b. 31 July 1816
4. Sophia Frances Anne Hulton, b. 27 October 1817
5. Randle Harrington Hulton, b. 23 December 1818
6. Frederick Bleythin Hulton, b. 26 January 1820 – d. 18 September 1839
7. Mary Gertrude Hulton, b. 21 July 1821
8. Charles Norleigh Hulton, b. 10 January 1823
9. Hugh Thurstain Hulton, b. 10 March 1824
10. Alfred Lacy Hulton, b. 1 August 1825
11. Emma Louisa Hulton, b. 12 March 1827
12. Edward Lister Hulton, b. 1828

Honorary titles
| Preceded by Samuel Clowes | High Sheriff of Lancashire; 1810 | Succeeded by Samuel Chetham Hilton |
