= Over Hulton =

Coordinates: 53.544°N 2.471°W

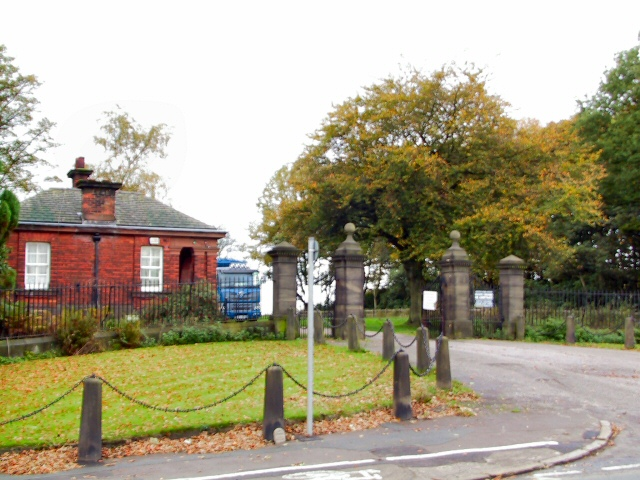
- Hulton Park gates

- Location within Greater Manchester
- OS grid reference: SD687053
- Metropolitan borough: Bolton
- Metropolitan county: Greater Manchester
- Region: North West
- Country: England
- Sovereign state: United Kingdom
- Post town: BOLTON
- Postcode district: BL5
- Dialling code: 01204
- Police: Greater Manchester
- Fire: Greater Manchester
- Ambulance: North West
- UK Parliament: Bolton West

Over Hulton is a suburb of Westhoughton within the Metropolitan Borough of Bolton, in Greater Manchester, England. Historically part of Lancashire, it lies 3.5 miles (5.6 km) south west of Bolton.

== History ==
The ancient district of Hulton, contained three townships, Over Hulton, Middle Hulton and Little Hulton, it was recorded as Helghtun and Hulton in 1235, Hilton in 1278 and 1292, Hulton in 1292 although Hilton was still used until the 17th century. The chief manor was held by the Hultons at Hulton Park in Over Hulton.

The earliest recorded Hultons were Iorweth and Madoc who came from Wales in 1167. It is possible they were joining family who were in the township from 989. Richard de Hulton, is recorded as having freehold of lands in the districts of Hulton, Ordsall, Flixton and Heaton in 1304. At Hulton he built Hulton Hall which was surrounded by a 1,316-acre (5.33 km^{2}) park with 4 acres (1.6 ha) of water. The estate was rich in coal mines. The last surviving member of the Hulton family was Sir Geoffrey Hulton, his family had owned the land for 800 years. The hall was demolished in 1958.

In 1819, a member of this family, the magistrate William Hulton ordered the Yeomanry Cavalry in to arrest William Hunt as he addressed the demonstration at St Peter's Field in Manchester setting off what was to become known as the Peterloo massacre.

The Bolton and Leigh Railway ran to the west serving the Hulton Collieries. The Hulton Collieries Hulton Bank Colliery, otherwise known as the Pretoria Pit, was situated to the south of Hulton Park and just north of the Atherton boundary. The colliery was open from 1901 to 1934. An explosion on 21 December 1910 was the third worst mining disaster in British mining history.

In 1902 a tramway from Lowton via Leigh and Atherton opened to Four Lane Ends where it connected with the trams of Bolton Corporation.

In 2010 the Hulton Park Estate was offered for sale after being home to the Hulton family since 1167. It was bought by the Peel Group.

== Governance ==
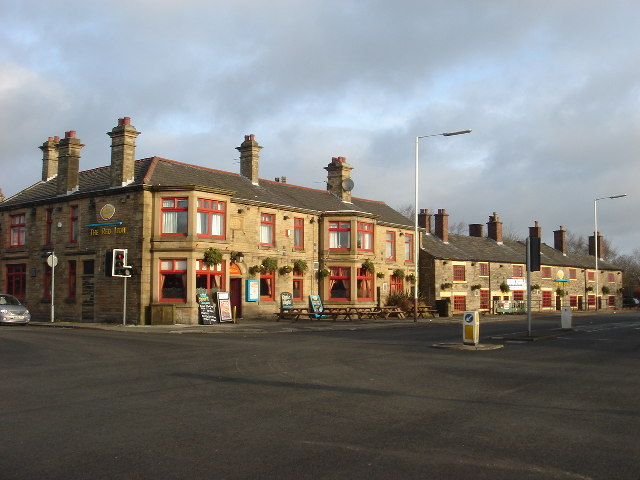
Four Lane Ends

Part of the hundred of Salford, until the 19th century, Over Hulton was a township in the parish of Deane. In 1837 Over Hulton along with neighbouring townships (or civil parishes) became part of the Bolton Poor Law Union which took responsibility for the administration and funding of the Poor Law in that area. In 1866 Over Hulton became a separate civil parish, on 30 September 1898 the parish was abolished and merged with Bolton and Westhoughton, the Daubhill area of Over Hulton became part of the County Borough of Bolton and the remainder became part of Westhoughton Urban District. In 1891 the parish had a population of 1533.

== Geography ==
The area of Over Hulton is 1,300 acres (5.3 km^{2}) of mainly arable land and the underlying rocks are the middle coal measures of the Lancashire Coalfield. Over Hulton is the most westerly of the Hulton Townships. The Manchester to Chorley road, the A6, crosses the Bolton to Leigh road, the A579 at Four Lane Ends which was the original hamlet in the township. The M61 passes to the north of Over Hulton.

The Logistics North industrial area was developed in the 2010s, adjacent to the M61 motorway.

== Religion ==
There are two churches in Over Hulton, St Andrew's C. of E. was established in 1977 and the Roman Catholic St Vincent de Paul.

== See also ==
- List of mining disasters in Lancashire
