= Westhoughton Mill =

Former building in Westhoughton, Greater Manchester, England

Coordinates: 53.548°N 2.520°W

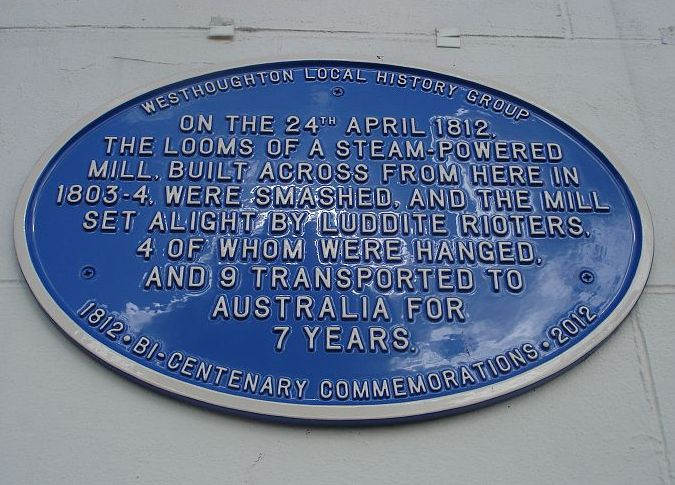
Blue plaque on the White Lion public house near the site of the mill

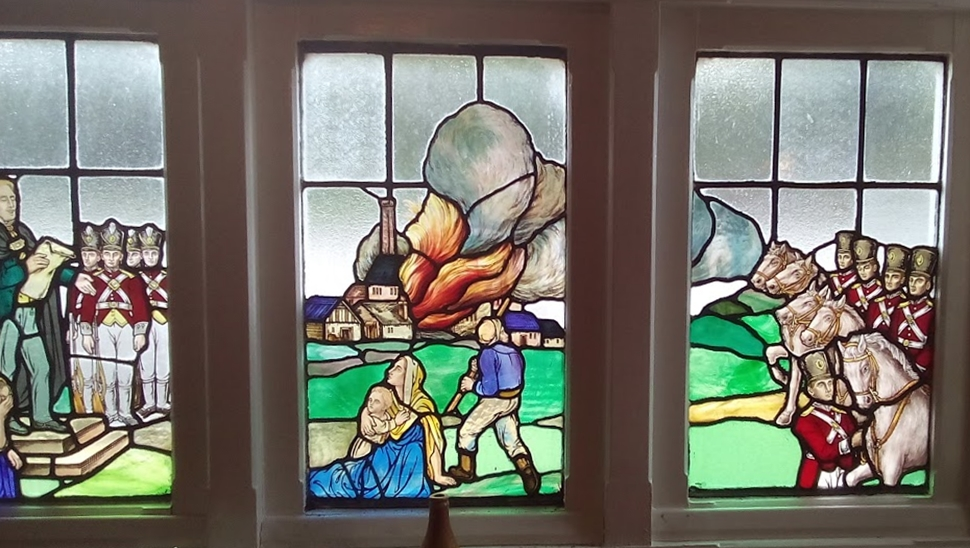
Stained glass window depicting the burning of the mill in the Waggon & Horses public house, Westhoughton

Westhoughton Mill or Rowe and Dunscough's Mill, on Mill Street in Westhoughton, near Bolton in the historic English county of Lancashire, was the site of a Luddite arson attack in 1812. The mill was built in 1804 by Richard Johnson Lockett, a Macclesfield man who lived at Westhoughton Hall. He leased the mill to Thomas Rowe of Manchester in 1808.

During 1811 and 1812 Luddites had been attacking powered mills throughout the English North and Midlands to such an effect that the government in February 1812 passed the Frame Breaking Act making the damaging of powered looms punishable by death. Skilled weavers lost their livelihoods when production moved from a domestic system to new manufactories causing severe hardship and unrest among the workers. Unemployed weavers joined the Luddites believing their only hope was to destroy the machines. The government repressed rebellion by punishing offenders severely. In 1812 Luddite disorder around Manchester reached its peak.

On Friday 28 April, a large crowd of weavers and mechanics gathered in Westhoughton with the intention of destroying the power looms in Rowe and Dunscough's Mill. The Scots Greys, deployed in Bolton by the government to quell unrest, were sent for but all was quiet when the contingent arrived and they returned to their quarters. Soon after they left, the factory and its contents were set alight and when the military returned the premises were destroyed and the culprits had disappeared. Some rioters gathered in the village in the evening demanding food and drink or money and the military was recalled and the Riot Act was read. Information about the ringleaders was collected and 24 men were arrested and sent for trial at Lancaster Assizes. Some were discharged but, "for having wilfully and maliciously set on fire and burnt a Weaving Mill, Warehouse and Loom Shop in the possession of Thomas Rowe and Thomas Dunscough at Westhoughton", Job Fletcher, James Smith, Thomas Kerfoot and Abraham Charlson, were sentenced to death and hanged and nine men were transported. After the Luddite act, manufacturers avoided the township until Chadwick's Silk Mill was built in the early 1850s. Westhoughton Hall was attacked at the same time.

According to James Thomas Staton's account of the incident in The Brunnin' o' Westhowtun Factory (1857), government spies were embedded among the workers and the mill's management had set a trap to ensnare discontent workers by inciting violence among them; some researchers believe this scenario to have been likely.

The mill was rebuilt after the attack and converted to a corn mill, until it was bought in 1840 by Peter Ditchfield, a cotton manufacturer who restored it to a cotton mill. On his death in 1854 the mill, by then employing some 40 people, passed to his son, Peter Ditchfield, jnr. After many years of spinning cotton and making flock, production ceased and the mill stood empty. It was eventually demolished in 1912 and the site is still (2017) a vacant lot.

A blue plaque was installed on the nearby White Lion public house in 2012 to commemorate the bicentenary of the burning of the mill, an event traditionally held to have been planned in the pub.

== See also ==
- List of mills in Bolton
