= Westhoughton =

Town in Greater Manchester, England

Coordinates: 53.549°N 2.529°W

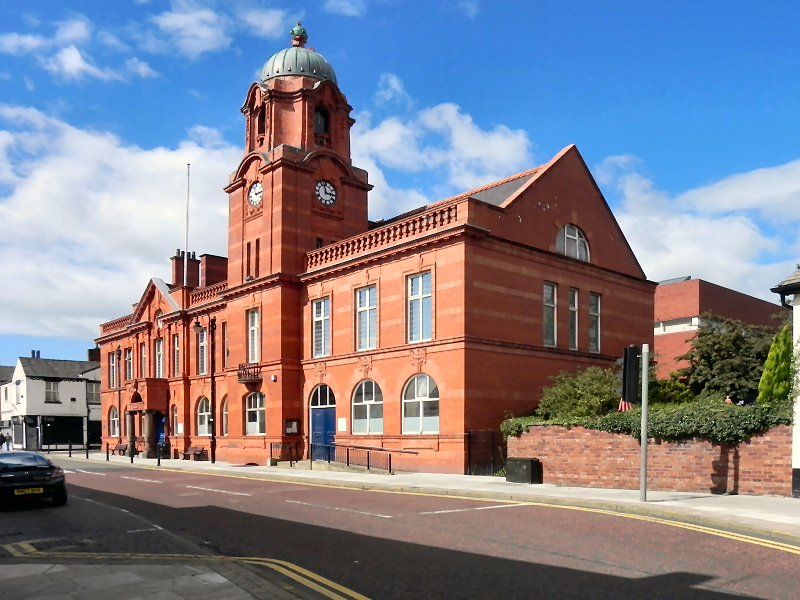
- Westhoughton Town Hall, built 1903

- Location within Greater Manchester
- Population: 24,974 (2011 census)
- OS grid reference: SD6505
- Civil parish: Westhoughton
- Metropolitan borough: Bolton
- Metropolitan county: Greater Manchester
- Region: North West
- Country: England
- Sovereign state: United Kingdom
- Post town: Bolton
- Postcode district: BL5
- Dialling code: 01942
- Police: Greater Manchester
- Fire: Greater Manchester
- Ambulance: North West
- UK Parliament: Bolton West
- Website: Official website

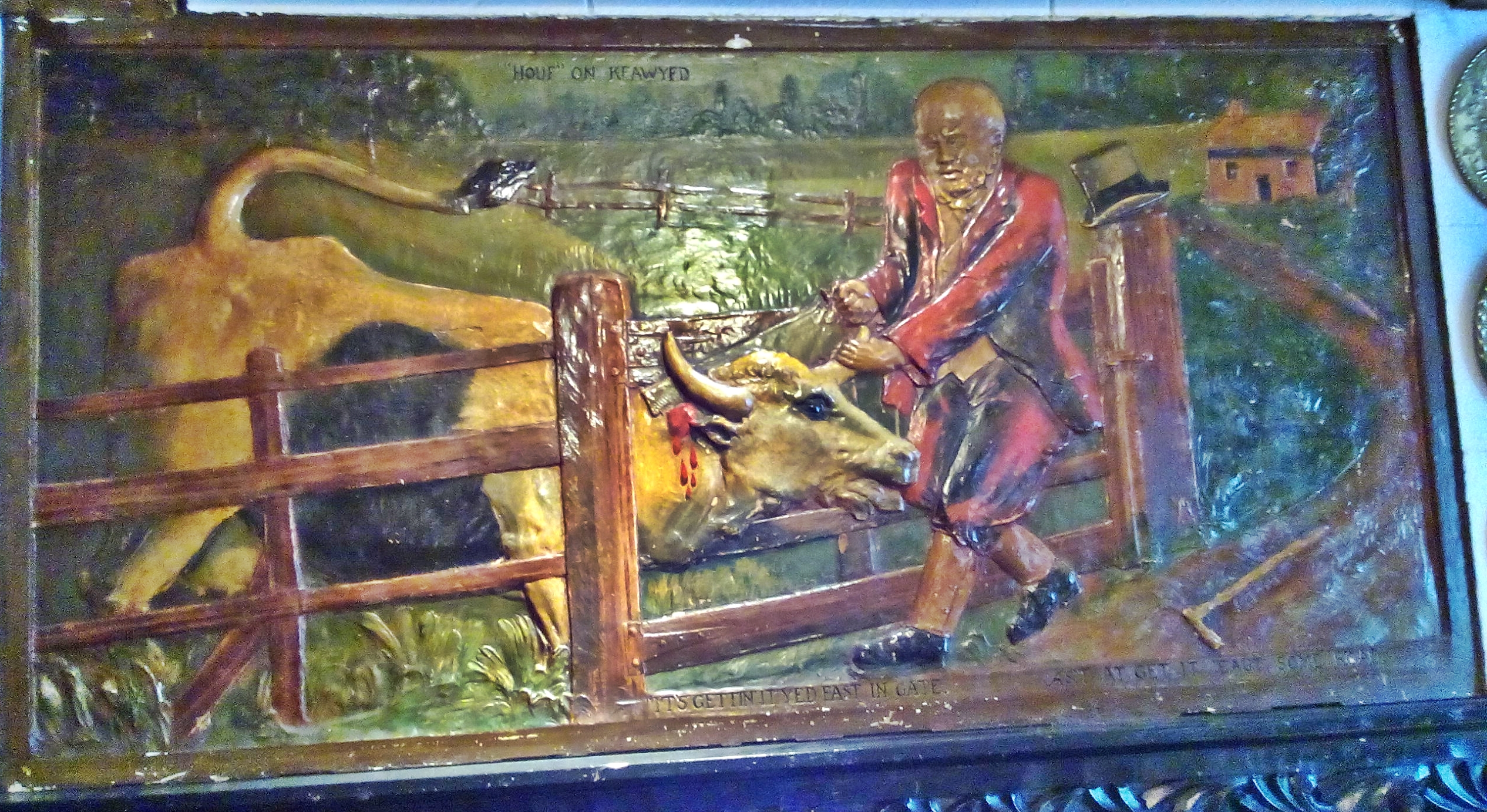
Farmer cutting off the cow's head – picture in the Waggon and Horses pub

Westhoughton (/wɛstˈhɔːtən/ west-HAW-tən) is a town and civil parish in the Metropolitan Borough of Bolton, Greater Manchester, England, 4 miles (6 km) southwest of Bolton, 5 miles (8 km) east of Wigan and 13 miles (21 km) northwest of Manchester.

Within the boundaries of the historic county of Lancashire, Westhoughton was once a centre for coal mining, cotton-spinning and textile manufacture. It had a population of 24,974 at the 2011 census.

Westhoughton incorporates several former villages and hamlets which have their own distinctive character, sports traditions and amenities, including Wingates, White Horse, Over Hulton, Four Gates, Chequerbent, Hunger Hill, Snydale, Hart Common, Marsh Brook, Daisy Hill and Dobb Brow.

== History ==
=== Toponymy ===
The name Westhoughton is derived from the Old English, halh (dialectal "haugh") for a nook or corner of land, and 'tun' for a farmstead or settlement – meaning a "westerly settlement in a corner of land". It has been recorded variously as Halcton in 1210, Westhalcton in 1240, Westhalghton in 1292, Westhalton in 1302 and in the 16th-century as Westhaughton and Westhoughton.

The people of Westhoughton are sometimes known as "Howfeners" (from Houghton) or "Keaw-yeds" (cow heads) or "Keawyedners" (a combination of the two), and the town is known as "Keawyed City". Supposed folklore ("re-invented" in the Edwardian period) describes a farmer who found his cow with its head stuck in a five barred gate, and, rather than damage the gate, cut the cow's head off, as the cow cost less than the gate. The village of Tideswell in Derbyshire shares this same legend.

=== Banastre Rebellion ===
In 1315, a group of men led by Sir William Bradshaigh of Haigh Hall, Sir Henry Lea of Charnock Richard and Sir Adam Banastre met at Wingates to plan a campaign of violence against Sir Robert de Holland of Upholland, chief retainer of the powerful Earl of Lancaster. The campaign came to be known as the Banastre Rebellion and ended with the deaths of most of the main protagonists.

=== Civil War ===
On 15 December 1642, during the English Civil War, the Battle of Warcock Hill was fought on Westhoughton Common between Lord Derby's Cavalier forces and Parliamentarians. The site of the battle was off the Manchester Road where Wayfaring is today. The Parliamentarians under Captains Bradshaw, Venables and Browne ran into a force of some thousand Royalists from the Wigan garrison under Lord Derby and were forced to surrender. The three captains and 160 men were taken prisoner.

It is believed that Prince Rupert of the Rhine gathered his troops in Westhoughton before the attack and ensuing massacre at Bolton in 1644. Civil War activity is also known to have occurred around the site of Hunger Hill and a sword claimed to be from the time of the Civil War was discovered in the garden of one of the cottages at Pocket Nook in Chew Moor during the 1950s.

=== Industrial Revolution ===
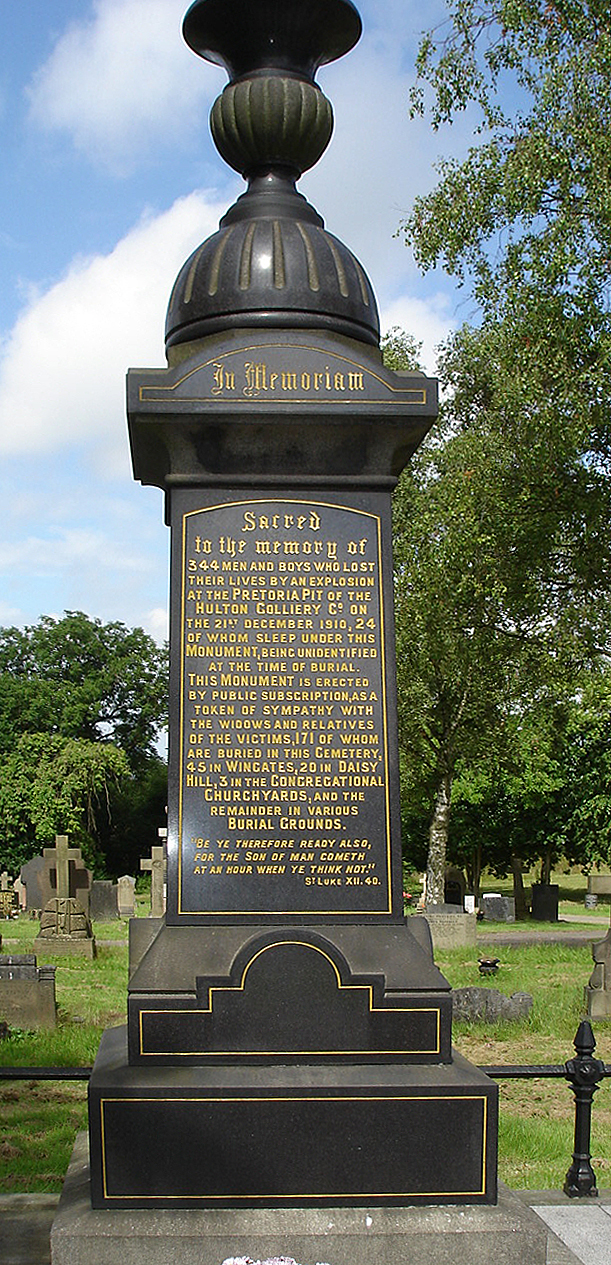
The original Pretoria Pit Memorial in Westhoughton Cemetery

On 25 March 1812, a group of Luddites burned Rowe and Dunscough's Westhoughton Mill. Twelve people were arrested on the orders of William Hulton, the High Sheriff of Lancashire. James Smith, Thomas Kerfoot, John (or Job) Fletcher and Abraham Charlston, were sentenced to death for their part in the attack. The Charlston family claimed that Abraham was only 12 years old; but he was not reprieved. The men were publicly hanged outside Lancaster Castle on 13 June 1812. It was reported that Abraham cried for his mother on the scaffold. By this time, however, hanging of those under 18 was rare and of those under 16, in practice, abolished. Nine others were transported to Australia. The riots are commemorated by a blue plaque on the White Lion public house opposite the mill site.

In 1891, the Rose Hill Doubling Mill had 8,020 spindles and Higson and Biggs' Victoria Mill had 40,000 spindles. Bolton Road Mill housed 564 looms weaving shirtings and Perseverance Mill had 600 looms manufacturing twills, sateens and plain cotton cloth. The looms in John Chadwick's Silk Mills produced broad silks, tie silks, scarves and handkerchiefs. The Lancashire Hosiery Company produced vests. Thomas Welch was a calico printer at the Green Vale Print Works.

The family of William Hulton of Hulton Park owned many small collieries from the 16th-century. After 1828 the pits at Chequerbent were served by the Bolton and Leigh Railway. The Hulton Colliery Company sank Chequerbent Colliery in 1892 and Bank Pit Nos 1–4 between 1897 and 1901. The company mined the Trencherbone, Plodder and Arley seams. Bank Pit No 3, known as the Pretoria Pit, was the site of one Britain's worst coal-mining disasters when on 21 December 1910, 344 men and boys died in an explosion of firedamp. The Pretoria Pit Disaster was the third worst in British mining history, after the 1866 Barnsley Oaks Disaster in Yorkshire, which killed 361 miners, and the 1913 Senghenydd Colliery Disaster in Glamorgan, which killed 439. A memorial erected in 1910 is Grade II listed.

In 1896, the Wigan Coal and Iron Company's Eatock Pits employed 484 underground and 89 surface workers whilst the Hewlett Pits, at Hart Common, employed 981 underground and 182 on the surface.

== Governance ==
Lying within the boundaries of Lancashire since the early 12th-century, Westhoughton was a chapelry and township in the ecclesiastical parish of Deane, in the Salford hundred. In 1837, Westhoughton joined with other townships (or civil parishes) to form the Bolton Poor Law Union and took joint responsibility for the administration and funding of the Poor Law in that area. In 1872, a Local board of health was established for the township, but was superseded in 1894 by the creation of Westhoughton Urban District which shared local government responsibilities with Lancashire County Council. In 1898, most of Over Hulton became part of the urban district. Westhoughton Town Hall was built in 1903 to a plan by Bradshaw and Gass, architects of Bolton replacing the Local Board Offices at the junction of Market Street and Wigan Road.

Under the Local Government Act 1972, Westhoughton Urban District was abolished in 1974 and its area became a civil parish of the newly created Metropolitan Borough of Bolton in Greater Manchester. It is represented by six councillors elected in two borough wards – Westhoughton North and Chew Moor and Westhoughton South – on the metropolitan borough council.

Westhoughton civil parish gained town council status in 1985, and has 18 town councillors elected from six town council wards – Central, Chequerbent, Daisy Hill, Hoskers and Hart Common, White Horse, and Wingates. Each year the town council elects a town mayor.

=== Parliamentary representation ===
For 98 years between 1885 and 1983, the Westhoughton constituency represented the town. Although, since 1906, always returning a Labour candidate, the elections were, after 1950, a close run contest, due to the working class conservatism found in Westhoughton and surrounding areas and the inclusion of more rural (Conservative) areas in boundary revision. At the 1906 general election, the birth of the modern Labour Party, William Tyson Wilson was one of 29 successful Labour Representation Committee candidates.

The constituency had by-elections in 1921, 1951 and 1973 due to the retirement, ill-health or death of the sitting MPs. The last MP for Westhoughton was Roger Stott (Labour) who, on abolition of the Westhoughton constituency, was elected MP for Wigan in 1983.

The 1983 redistribution of seats reflected local government reforms made in 1974. In September 2011, the Boundary Commission for England proposed recreating a Westhoughton constituency to incorporate Westhoughton, Blackrod, Hindley, Atherton, and parts of Horwich and Leigh

== Geography ==
Westhoughton covers an area of 4,341 acres (1,757 ha) and has an average breadth of over 2 miles (3.2 km) from north-east to south-west, and an extreme length of nearly 3.5 miles (5.6 km) from northwest to south-east. The highest ground at over 480 feet (150 m) is to the north east with the land sloping downwards to the south-west. The lowest point at about 120 feet (37 m) is in the extreme southerly corner. Borsdane Brook separates the township from Aspull, another brook divides it from Hindley joining a stream which rises on the northern edge of Westhoughton and flows south through Leigh to Glazebrook. The town incorporates several former villages and hamlets including railway stations including Wingates, White Horse, Over Hulton, Four Gates (or Fourgates), Chequerbent, Hunger Hill, Snydale, Hart Common, Marsh Brook, Daisy Hill and Dobb Brow.

Local Nature Reserves are located at Hall Lee Bank Park, Cunningham Clough, and Eatock Lodge at Daisy Hill.

== Demography ==
Population changes in Westhoughton since 1801

Year	Population	±%
1801	3,059	—
1811	3,810	+24.6%
1821	4,211	+10.5%
1831	4,500	+6.9%
1841	4,527	+0.6%
1851	4,547	+0.4%
1861	5,156	+13.4%

Year	Population	±%
1871	6,609	+28.2%
1881	9,197	+39.2%
1891	11,077	+20.4%
1901	14,377	+29.8%
1911	15,046	+4.7%
1921	15,592	+3.6%
1931	16,018	+2.7%

Year	Population	±%
1939	14,636	−8.6%
1951	15,004	+2.5%
1961	16,260	+8.4%
1971	17,761	+9.2%
2001	23,056	+29.8%
2011	24,974	+8.3%

== Education ==
The long established St John's, Wingates CE Primary & Fourgates County Primary schools were closed in 2004 following amalgamation to form The Gates CP School. Westhoughton CP School closed in 2008. An earlier round of reorganisation saw the closure of Hart Common Primary School and opening of St George's on The Hoskers, and the closure of the tiny County Primary at White Horse which is now a private nursery.

School	Type/Status	Ofsted	Website
Eatock Primary School, Daisy Hill	Primary	105202	Official site
Sacred Heart R.C. Primary School	Primary	105243	Official site
St George's C.E. Primary School	Primary	131038	Official site
St James C.E. Primary School, Daisy Hill	Primary	105209	Official site
St Thomas' C.E. School, Chequerbent	Primary	105234	Official site
The Gates Primary School	Primary	133926	Official site
Washacre Primary School	Primary	105199	Official site
St Bartholomew's C of E Primary School originally Westhoughton Parochial C.E. Primary School	Primary	105237	Official site
Westhoughton Primary School (closed 2008)	Primary	105180	Official site
Westhoughton High School	Secondary	105252	Official site

== Religion ==
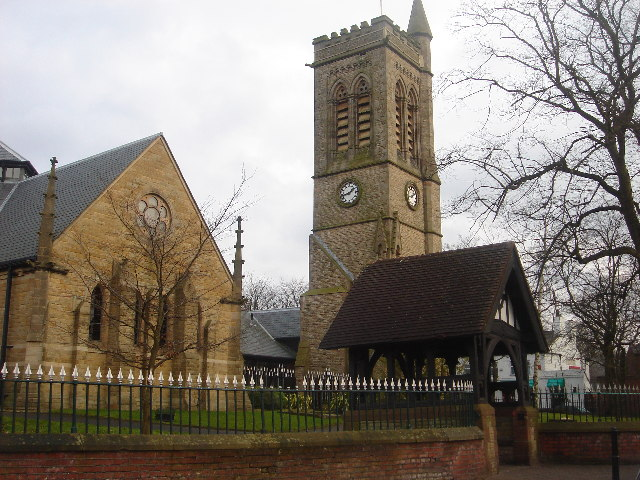
The parish church of St Bartholomew

Westhoughton's old chapel of 1552 was replaced by a brick-built church in 1731 and the parish church in 1869–70. Dedicated to Saint Bartholomew, it had an east window depicting the twelve apostles. In 1990, the church was gutted by fire, but the tower was saved, and is Grade II listed. A new church, designed by architects Dane, Ashworth & Cottam, was built at a cost of about £1 million, and consecrated in 1995 by the Bishop of Manchester. Nicholsons of Malvern built its two manual organs with 1,256 pipes, ranging from 1/2 inch to 16 feet (4.9 m) made of tin, spotted metal and hammered lead.

Other Anglican churches include St John the Evangelist, in the Parish of Wingates, and St James the Great, in the Parish of Daisy Hill. St James' is a Grade II* listed building.

The Roman Catholic Sacred Heart parish church fell into disrepair; it was demolished and replaced by a new building incorporating a church hall.

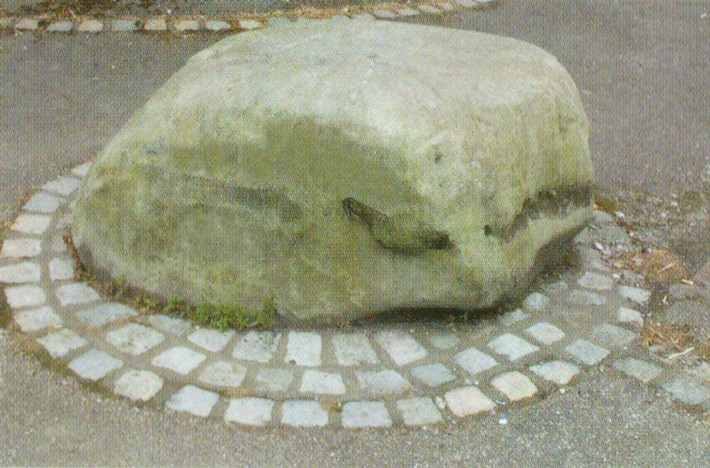
Stone from which John Wesley is said to have preached

John Wesley preached a sermon at Barnaby's Farm in Wingates in 1784. Services were held in cottages opposite the farm before the first Methodist church was built in 1835. Another Methodist Church was built in Dixon Street in 1871. Houses occupy the site of Westhoughton Independent Methodist Church, where Wesley once stood, but the stone, from which he preached, was moved to Grove Lane Chapel, now Westhoughton Methodist Church's church hall. The final service was held by the Independent Methodist Church in 2001 and the church was subsequently demolished. Daisy Hill Methodist Church was closed and demolished in the late 1980s. The new, Methodist church was built adjacent to Grove Lane Chapel, which now serves as church hall.

The industrial north west was a focus for non-conformism, and until the 1990s the Church of the Nazarene stood in Church Street. The Quaker Meeting House is now a Christian fellowship, and a tin tabernacle was situated off Bolton Road. There is a Pentecostal church, a United Reformed Church, The Bethel, and an independent church on Tithbarn Street.

== Landmarks ==
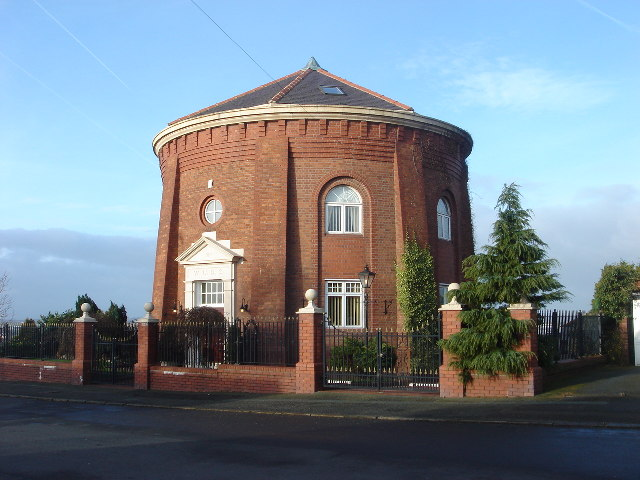
Snydle water tower

Snydle water tower was built by Westhoughton Council in 1914 and lay derelict for many years with its tank removed and the tower open to the sky. It has been restored and converted into a private dwelling that is visible from the M61 motorway.

The Church of England School built in 1861, opposite St Bartholomew's church, is a Grade II listed building as are houses at 110 and 112, Market Street. The school, which was known as Westhoughton Parochial School, has been renamed St Bartholomew's Church of England, Primary School.

The red brick and terracotta town hall and Carnegie library were built between 1902 and 1904 to the designs of Bradshaw & Gass.

== Transport ==
The M61 motorway passes through the north of the town which it serves by junctions 5 and 6. The A58 and the A6 cross the town as do the B5236, the B5235, and the B5239. The motorway separated the townships of Hunger Hill and Chew Moor from the rest of Westhoughton and the Bolton Road was completely severed. A new link road, Snydale Way, was built between Chequerbent and a spur to the old Bolton Road, via a roundabout at M61 junction 5. Snydale Way, a broad, dual carriageway, was built to full four lane motorway standard, with a broad centre verge allowing widening to six lanes. The original intention was that it would form the beginning of a new motorway, running southwest, linking the M61 with the M6. Although the route was fully allocated and all planning and public consultation completed, the project was shelved due to financial constraints.

Westhoughton railway station and Daisy Hill railway station are served by Northern trains between Wigan Wallgate and Manchester. Westhoughton is served by 2tph westbound to Southport via Wigan, 1tph eastbound to Stalybridge via Manchester Victoria and 1tph eastbound to Manchester Oxford Road. Daisy Hill is served by 2tph westbound to Wigan Wallgate (with 1tph continuing to Headbolt Lane) and 2tph eastbound to Todmorden via Manchester Victoria with 1tph continuing to Blackburn and 1tph continuing to Leeds via Brighouse. Trains from Daisy Hill run via Atherton, trains from Westhoughton run via Bolton. Formerly there were stations at Chequerbent (closed 1952) Dicconson Lane and Hilton House both closed in 1954.

In the late 1980s, a railway station was planned for Dobb Brow but never built. Lostock and Horwich Parkway stations, to the north, also serve the town. The annual usage of Daisy Hill and Westhoughton stations was more than 500,000 passengers in 2013/14, greater than many major UK towns.

Electric trams to Bolton served Westhoughton until 1947 after 23 years of service. On 19 December 1924, the Bolton to Deane service was extended to Westhoughton.

All bus services in Westhoughton are part of Transport for Greater Manchester's Bee Network. Go North West operates service 520 between Bolton and Westhoughton via Ladybridge, then operating as a circular service to Wingates and Westhoughton before returning to Bolton, as well as the most frequent service 607 (formerly 7) from Bolton to Wigan via Hindley. The remainder of services are operated by Diamond North West, those being service 516 between Leigh and Horwich via Atherton and Middlebrook, service 521 between Little Lever and Blackrod via Farnworth and Royal Bolton Hospital, and service 559 between Bolton and Ashton-in-Makerfield via Daubhill, Hindley and Platt Bridge. Services 520, 559 and 607 serve Bolton Interchange for further bus and rail connections to areas such as Bury, Preston, Manchester and Chorley.

== Media ==
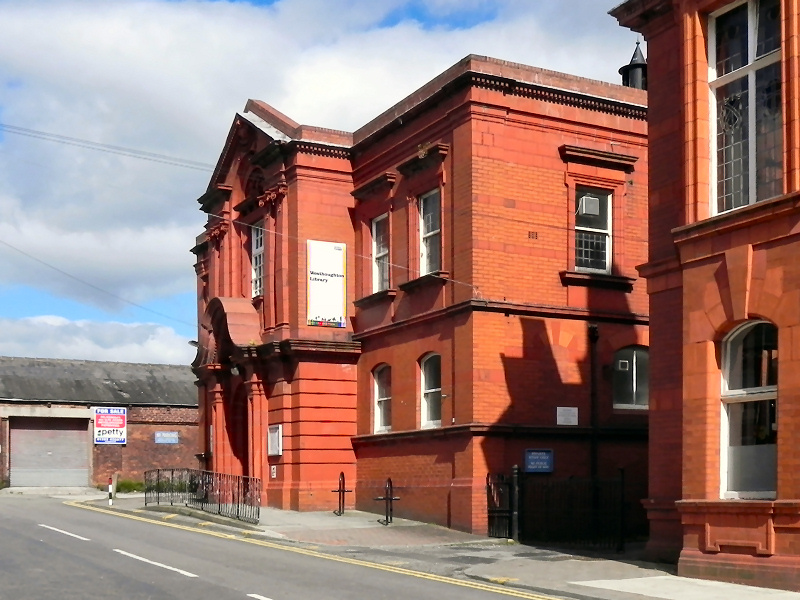
Westhoughton Library, Library Street

The weekly Horwich and Westhoughton Journal was published (by The Bolton News) from 1925 until 1980, and had an editorial and revenue office in Market Street.

The town's Carnegie library is at the rear of the Town Hall. Its Carnegie Hall is used for meetings and other activities. A small museum has exhibits that relate to the Pretoria Pit Disaster and a large, encased model, of the original St Bartholomew's Parish Church, built from match-sticks.

Local news and television programmes are provided by BBC North West and ITV Granada. Television signals are received from the nearby Winter Hill TV transmitter situated north of the town.

Local radio stations are BBC Radio Manchester, Heart North West, Smooth North West, Greatest Hits Radio Bolton & Bury, Capital Manchester and Lancashire and Bolton FM, a community-based radio station which broadcast from its studios in Bolton.

== Notable residents ==
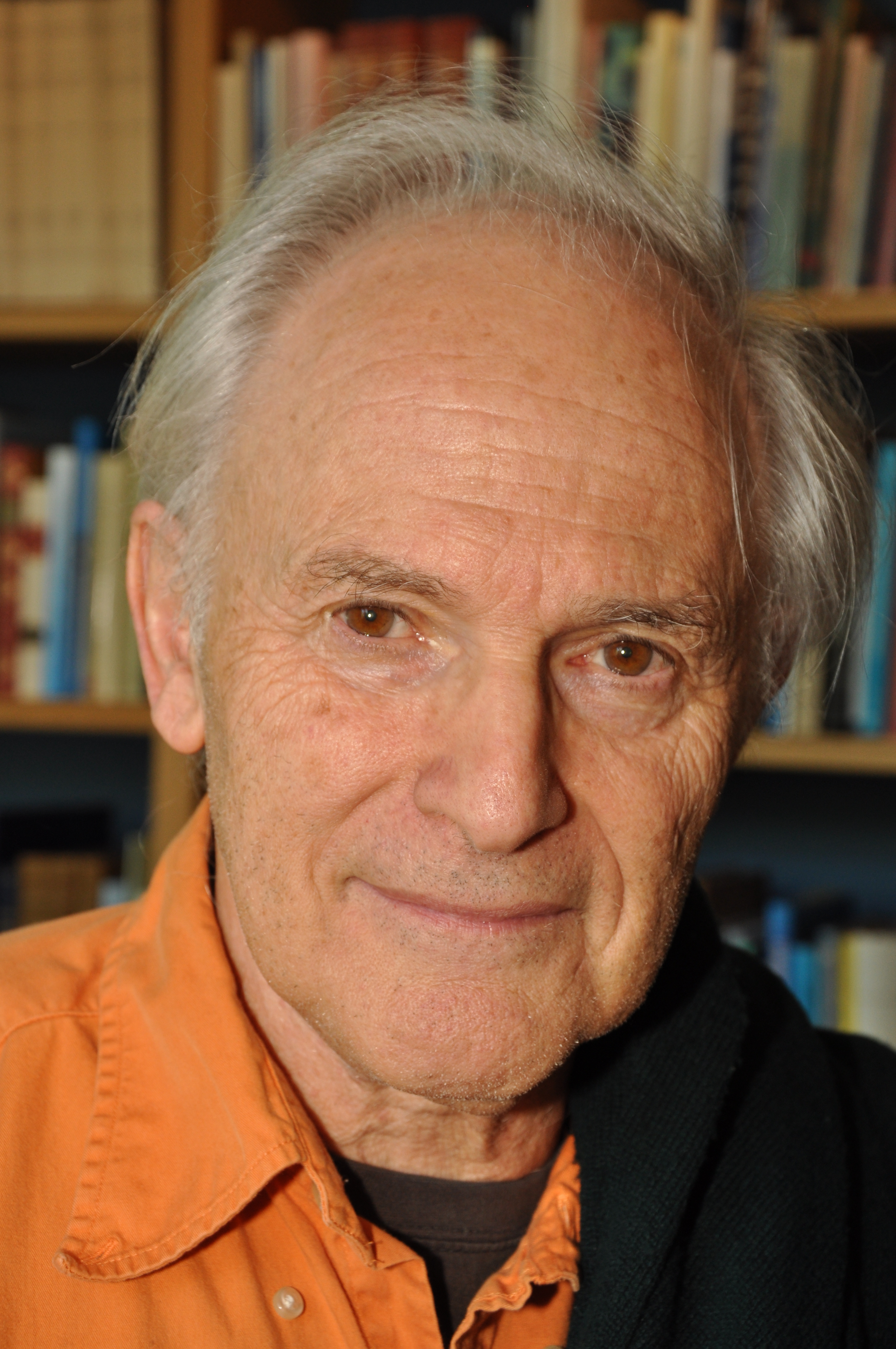
Sir Harry Kroto, 2011

- William Hulton (1787–1864), landowner, magistrate and collier who lived at Hulton Park
- Rev Peter Ditchfield (1854–1930), a Church of England priest, historian and author.
- Wingates Band (formed 1873), a local, competitive brass band
- Robert Shaw (1927–1978), actor he appeared in From Russia With Love, A Man for All Seasons, and Jaws.
- Sir Harry Kroto (1939-2016), chemist, won the Nobel Prize in Chemistry in 1996.
- Maxine Peake (born 1974), an English actress and narrator; went to school locally
- Houghton Weavers (1975-2012), a local folk group who had a BBC TV series, Sit thi' Deawn, in the 1970s

=== Sport ===
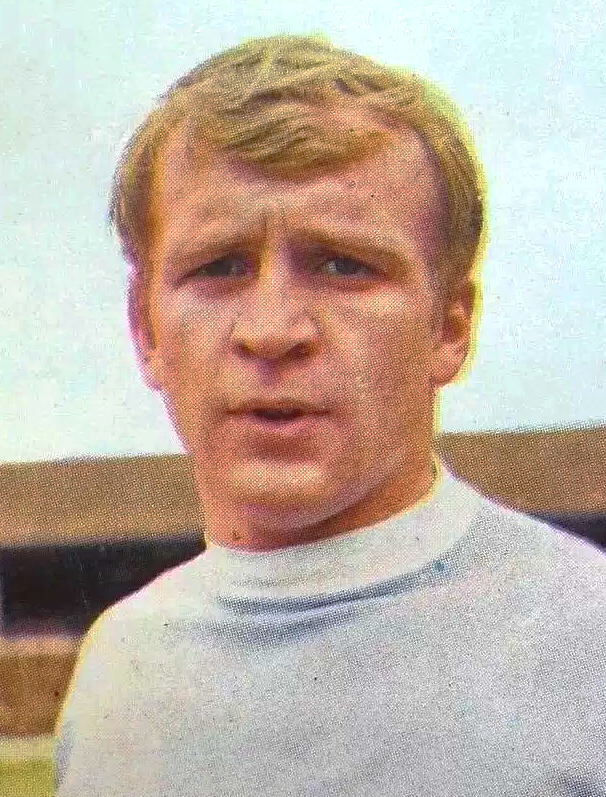
Francis Lee, 1970

- Samuel Marsh (born 1879), footballer who played 185 games for Bolton Wanderers
- Joe Wilson (1883–1945), footballer who played 238 games for Millwall
- Dick Tyldesley (1897–1943) cricketer, played 7 Test cricket matches and 397 First-class cricket matches.
- Jack Bruton (1903–1986), footballer, played 167 games for Burnley and 324 for Blackburn Rovers.
- Bill Farrimond (1903–1979), cricketer, played 4 Test cricket matches and 153 First-class cricket matches.
- Matt Gray (1907–1985), footballer who played 289 games for Oldham Athletic
- Ethel Johnson (1908–1964), sprinter, represented England at the 1932 Los Angeles Summer Olympics
- Dick Pollard (1912–1985), cricketer, played 4 Test cricket matches and 298 First-class cricket matches.
- Tom Woodward (1917–1994), footballer who played 152 games for Bolton Wanderers.
- Francis Lee (1944–2023), footballer played 500 games beginning with 189 for Bolton Wanderers and 249 with Manchester City and 27 with England.
- Mike Watkinson (born 1961), cricketer, played 4 Test cricket matches and 308 First-class cricket matches.
- Rob Parker (born 1981), former rugby league footballer who played 259 games
- Nicky Hunt (born 1983), footballer, played 407 games starting with 127 for Bolton Wanderers.

== Freedom of the Parish ==
The following people and military units have received the Freedom of the Parish of Westhoughton.

=== Individuals ===
- Peter L. Finch: 5 March 2019, Former Mayor of Westhoughton and Mayor of Bolton.
- The Houghton Weavers: 14 March 2026 and 21 March 2026, Folk music group.

== See also ==
- Listed buildings in Westhoughton
- Chequerbent railway station
- Chequerbent railway station (1831)
- Borsdane Wood
- Daisy Hill F.C.
- Westhoughton Greyhound Track
- List of mining disasters in Lancashire
