= Pretoria Pit disaster =

1910 mining accident in Over Hulton, North West England

Coordinates: 53°32′11″N 2°29′13″W

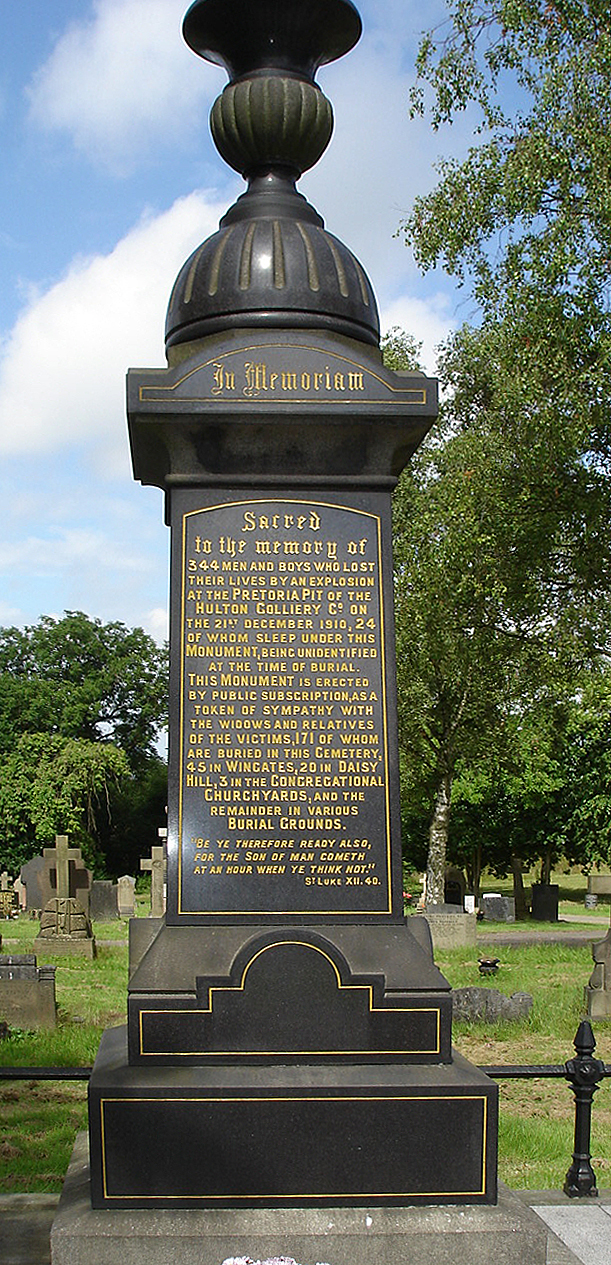
Memorial to Pretoria Pit Disaster, Westhoughton Cemetery

The Pretoria Pit disaster was a mining accident on 21 December 1910, when an underground explosion occurred at the Hulton Colliery Bank Pit No. 3, known as the Pretoria Pit, in Over Hulton, Westhoughton, then in the historic county of Lancashire, in North West England. A total of 344 men and boys lost their lives.

== Background ==
There were approximately 2,400 workers employed by the Hulton Colliery Company in 1910. On the morning of 21 December, approximately 900 workers arrived for the day shift. They were working five coal seams of the Manchester Coalfield: the Trencherbone, Plodder, Yard, Three-Quarters and Arley mines.

== Explosion ==
At 7:50 am, there was an explosion in the Plodder Mine, which was thought to have been caused by an accumulation of gas from a roof collapse the previous day.

That day 345 workers descended the No 3 bank pit shaft to work in the Plodder, Yard and Three Quarters mines. Of those, only four survived to be brought to the surface. One died immediately and one the next day. The two survivors were Joseph Staveley and William Davenport. In addition one man died in the Arley Mine of No. 4 Pit, bringing the total to 344. There was a final fatality that day, William Turton, who died while fighting a fire in No. 3 pit. The men who were working the other mines in the pit worked from No.4 shaft were unharmed.

== Aftermath ==
It was the second-worst mining accident in England, and the third-worst in Britain; after the Oaks Colliery explosion and Senghenydd Colliery Disaster.

Many of the fatalities were from the same family. The worst affected was the Tyldesley family in which Mrs Miriam Tyldesley lost her husband, four sons and two brothers. A relief fund was established for the families and dependants and a total of £145,000 was raised. In 1911, dependants were compensated and given annuities from a number of sources (including the fund). All the victims were members of Permanent Relief Societies to which they paid contributions weekly and most had private life insurance with friendly societies and all were covered by the Workmen's Compensation Act 1906 which brought together all (except the private insurance) the compensation to produce a lump sum and annuity for the dependants.

John Baxter was the last recipient of payments from the Hulton Colliery Explosion (1910) Relief Fund when he died in January 1973. The fund was dissolved in 1975 and the remaining assets transferred to other miners' relief funds.

== Memorials ==
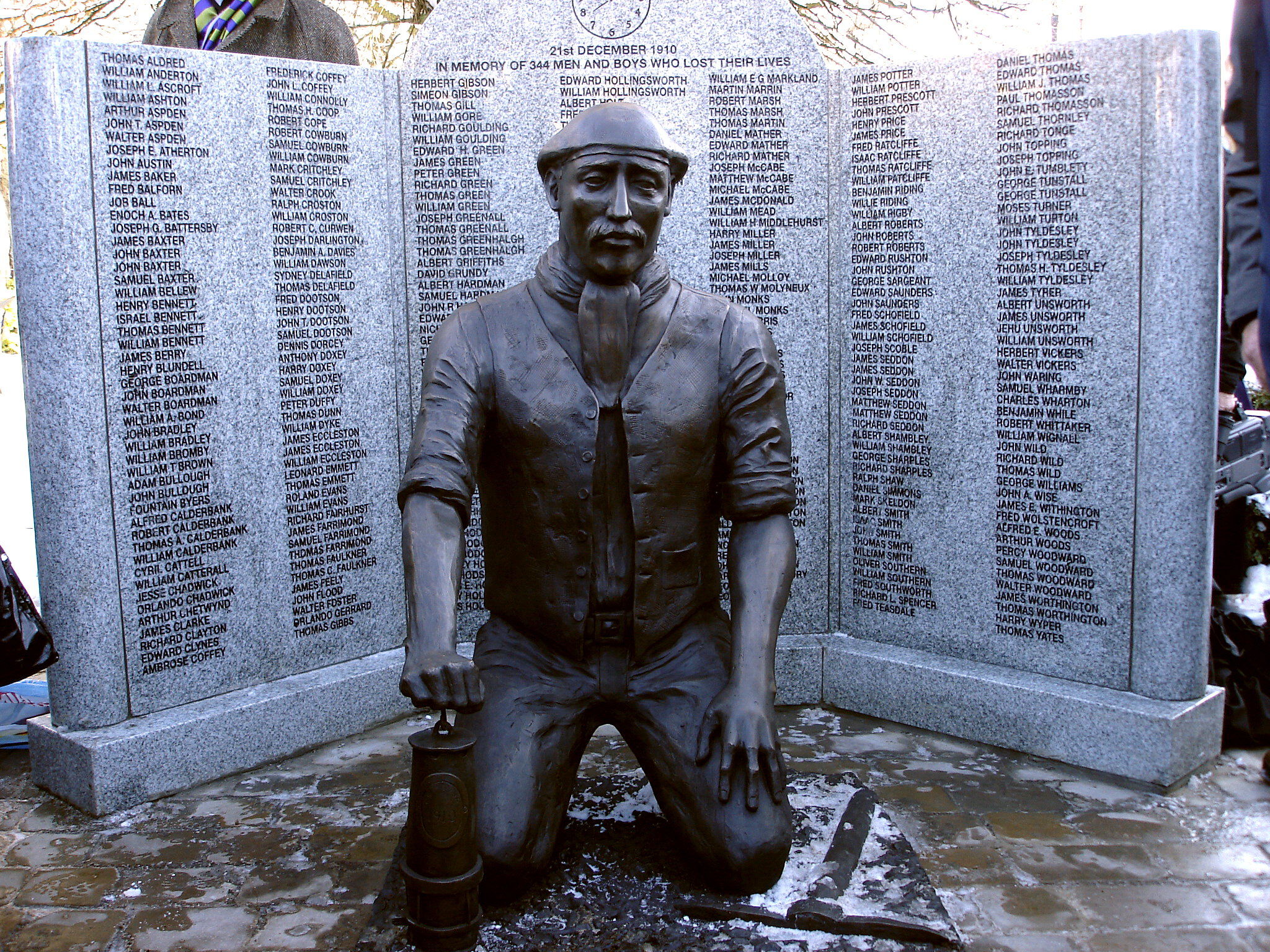
Memorial to the Pretoria miners

There is a memorial to the victims in Westhoughton cemetery. Erected in 1910, it is Grade II listed. A memorial service is held there each year and a selection of artifacts from the disaster is displayed in Westhoughton Central Library. A statue opposite Westhoughton church by Jane Robbins was unveiled on 19 December 2010 almost 100 years after the disaster. Another memorial was erected in 2010 on the 100th anniversary at the end of Broadway on the border between Atherton and Over Hulton funded from by grants and donations. The site is about 300 yards from the No.4 shaft from which the survivors and bodies were raised.

On 19 December 2008, an account of the disaster was discovered, written anonymously by a man who accompanied the rescue team.

A play, Sleep, Comrade Sleep, was written and performed in 2005 by the staff and students of Westhoughton High School and reprised for the centenary in 2010.

== See also ==
- List of mining disasters in Lancashire
