= List of field hockey clubs =

List of Field Hockey Clubs.

== A ==
- Annadale Hockey Club
- Avoca Hockey Club
- Club Atlético Porteño
- Atlètic Hockey Club
- Atlantic Storm Chasers

== B ==
- Bishop's Stortford Hockey Club
- Bolton Hockey Club
- Beeston Hockey Club
- Bowdon Hockey Club

== C ==
- Cannock Hockey Club
- Cliftonville Hockey Club
- Canterbury Hockey Club
- Chelmsford Hockey Club

== D ==
- Duchy Hockey Club

== E ==
- East Grinstead Hockey Club

== G ==
- Grange Royals Hockey Club
- Polisportiva Galatea Hockey

== H ==
- Havant Hockey Club
- Heywood Hockey Club

== I ==
- Inverleith Hockey Club

== K ==
- Kampong (field hockey club)
- HC Klein Zwitserland

== L ==
- Leeds Adel Carnegie Hockey Club
- Leeds Hockey Club
- Leek Hockey Club
- Lincoln Hockey Club
- Lindum Hockey Club
- Lisnagarvey Hockey Club

== M ==
- Mossley Hockey Club

== N ==
- North Wilts hockey club

== O ==
- Oxted Hockey Club

== P ==
- Plymouth University Hockey Club
- Pembroke Wanderers Hockey Club

== Q ==
- Queen's University Hockey Club

== R ==
- Rochdale Hockey Club
- Reading Hockey Club
- Romford Hockey Club
- HC Rotterdam

== S ==
- Southgate Hockey Club
- Surbiton Hockey Club
- Sliema Hotsticks Hockey Club

== T ==
- Tameside Hockey Club

== U ==
- Uhlenhorster Hockey Club

== V ==
- Valley Hockey Club
- Vanguard Hockey Club Ansavo

== W ==
- Waltham Forest Hockey Club
- Wapping Hockey Club
- Waverley Hockey Club
- West Vancouver Field Hockey Club
- Woking Hockey Club

== Y ==
- Young Stars Hockey Club

== See also ==
- List of South Australian field hockey clubs
