= Bolton Robots of Doom =

Information
- League: BBF (Division AA North)
- Location: Bolton, England
- Ballpark: Smithills Ballpark, Smithills, Bolton
- Founded: 2003
- Nickname(s): R.o.D. / Robots
- Post-season championships: 2011 AA GB NATIONAL CHAMPIONS. 2014 AA GB NATIONALS RUNNERS-UP. 2015 AA GB NATIONALS THIRD PLACE.
- League championships: 2010, 2011.
- 2011: 22–3
- Former name(s): Brewers, Blaze
- Former ballparks: CMB Sports Club, Lostock. Slack Lane, Westhoughton. Stapleton Avenue, Bolton. John Mills Ballpark, Runcorn.
- Colors: White/Navy/Orange
- Management: John Baxendale (GM) Michael Rawsthorne(Club Sec) Marc Darné (Club Treasurer)
- Manager: Riccardo Toniolo

Current uniforms
| Gameday | Training |

Bolton Robots of Doom (formerly Bolton Blaze) was an English baseball team from Bolton situated in the North West region of England, playing in the Northern AA Division under the British Baseball Federation. They have now moved to Runcorn and been incorporated into the Trojans Baseball Club of Liverpool to play as the Halton Trojans team.

== History ==
Information on the beginnings of Bolton baseball are scarce. The earliest known details date back to 1938. The then named Bolton Scarlets Baseball team played their first game at Raikes Park in Bolton against a team from Oldham in May 1938.

The modern team began in the summer of 2002 while Matthew Norburn was the General Manager and player for Manchester A's Baseball Club. Frustrated with the lack of direction and commitment Norburn decided to look into setting up a new club in his hometown of Bolton.

After early talks with the Bolton Local Authority, who were eager to have a baseball team set up in Bolton plans moved forward. Norburn recruited fellow player Barrie Joyce from Manchester to help set the club up. Norburn and Joyce finished off the season in Manchester and Norburn resigned as the club's GM.

Bolton Baseball Club took the team name of Brewers and went about preparing for 2003 baseball season, with only two team members. The Brewers soon secured a council grant that would ensure adequate equipment could be purchased.

As the 2003 season came closer Bolton had built up a good roster size with former junior players and people new to the sport. However the planned baseball field would not be ready till the end of the inaugural season. In a last minute deal Bolton Baseball agreed to join CMB Sports Club located in Lostock and became known as CMB Baseball Club.

Bolton Baseball Club remained part of CMB Sports Club for 3 years before making a move to their own facility. The team took this opportunity in 2006 to rename the team to the Blaze. The move to a new ground proved to be one of the biggest mistakes the club would ever make. The new ground provided by the Local Authority turned into a money pit. The ground situated off Slack Lane, Westhoughton was continually flooded by poor drainage. Looking to put a brave face on and play the season opener on this poor attempt of a field, Bolton awaited visiting team Humber. After looking at the state of the field, Humber refused to play at that site. The teams did however manage to locate a suitable site across town to play the game at Markland Hill Playing Fields. With no official home field, Bolton played the rest of the 2006 season at two different locations.

During the 2006 off-season major interest was put to the local council for use of the Markland Hill playing fields. After many discussions with the council it was agreed that Bolton Baseball Club could use the field. The field was renamed the Ballpark at Stapleton Avenue. Since the 2007 season the Blaze have invested heavily in developing the ball park in the aim that it will become one of the best facilities in the country.

During 2007 a junior baseball team was re-introduced into the Bolton community, originally headed by John Baxendale and later to be fulfilled by Andrew Lee Heaton. The junior team, named the Bears, entered league play in 2008. In 2009 the junior team was taken over by Dave Clugston who is still currently the junior team manager.

In 2008 the Bolton Blaze changed its name to Bolton Robots of Doom after a much-maligned voting process. The name change was met with a mixed reaction from its own players. Some embraced the outlandish new name, whilst others remained unimpressed; so much so that one player duly quit the team citing the name change as being utterly ridiculous. As one fan on a public forum put it..."You cannot make this stuff up!".

Nevertheless, club GM, Matthew Norburn, pressed on and remained unmoved by any criticism. Once the name was formally announced in the public domain, it again was greeted with varied reactions. Local team rivals scorned and ridiculed the club, whilst baseball fans bought into the spirit of such an unusual name, to the point where fans of the MLB's New York Mets began a thread on a fans' forum grandslamsingle.com discussing what they felt was a unique and inspired team name. One thing was guaranteed, no other baseball team had the name Robots of Doom.

Over the next few years, the team would evolve on a playing level. By introducing more talented players into the team Bolton R.o.D. would develop from its status as perennial division whipping boys, to serious divisional contenders. The team would also begin to take part in mid-season European tournaments, beginning in Dublin in 2008 where on the opening day Bolton R.o.D. almost upset the British allstar team, Northern Knights and kept within touching distance of the Irish national side, Team Ireland.

Then it was off to the Netherlands in 2009 & 2010, where the standards of baseball were at higher levels than had previously encountered. These elements combined would ultimately lead the club to its first ever playoff appearance in 2009, and a second playoff appearance in 2010 following the club's greatest success when it won AA/A North Division Title with a winning record of 18–6.

2010 also saw the club's first ever win on European soil against Hagen Chipmunks of Germany, and ultimately finishing 4th narrowly losing by 1 run to the tournament favourites Rouen Dragons of France.

In 2010 the club were featured in a two-page article entitled 'Bolton's Batmen' in Lancashire Life magazine, which covered the club's history and involvement in the Bolton community, and club GM Matthew Norburn was interviewed for BBC Radio live on air. This was Norburn's final act as club GM before returning to his native Canada and handing over General Manager's role over to Dom Clarke who lead the club into the 2011 season.

== Quick facts ==
Uniform colors: White/Navy/Orange.
Logo design: R.o.D Robot holding bat with circular background
Alternate logo design: Letter B.
Team motto: "Felt wrong not to swing"
Mascot: R.o.D. Robot.
Spring Training Facility: USN Bolton Arena, Horwich
AA North Division: Bolton Robots of Doom, Manchester A's, Sheffield Bladerunners, Manchester Torrent, Oldham Northstars, Harrogate Tigers, Newton Aycliffe Spartans, Liverpool Trojans II

== Retired numbers ==
'33' Adam Johnson (July 1981 – September 2004)
'9' Matthew Young-Mclaren (April 1971 – April 2011)

== See also ==
- Baseball in the United Kingdom
- British Baseball Federation
