= Bolton =

Town in Greater Manchester, England

Coordinates: 53°34′42″N 2°25′48″W

- Town
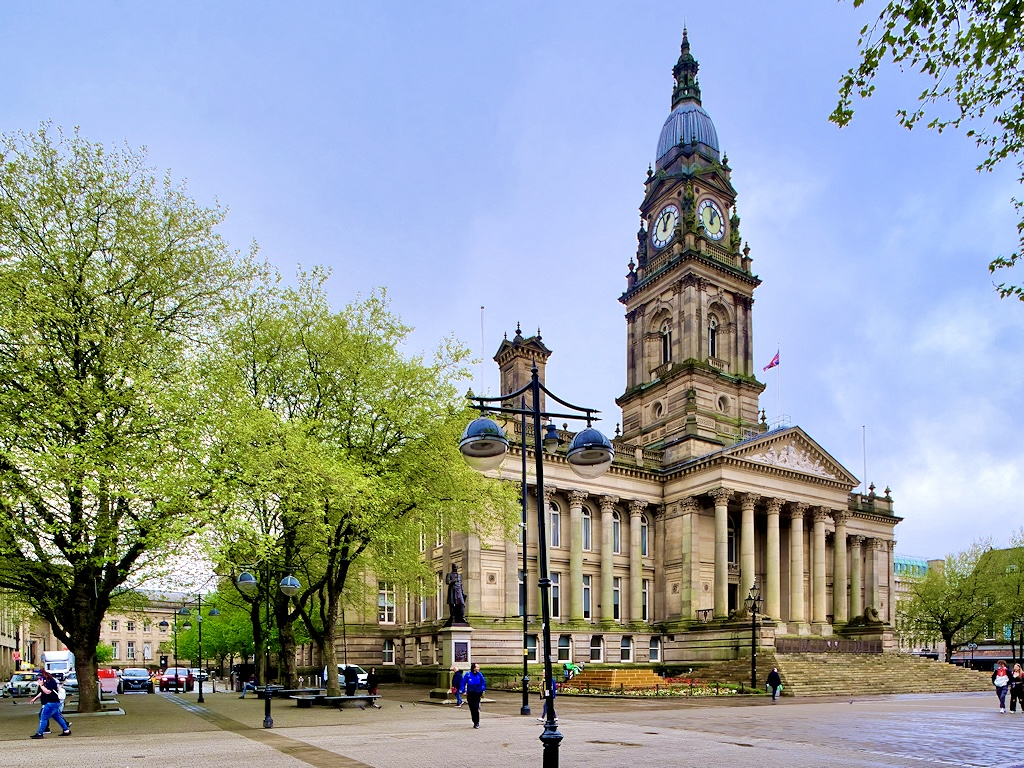
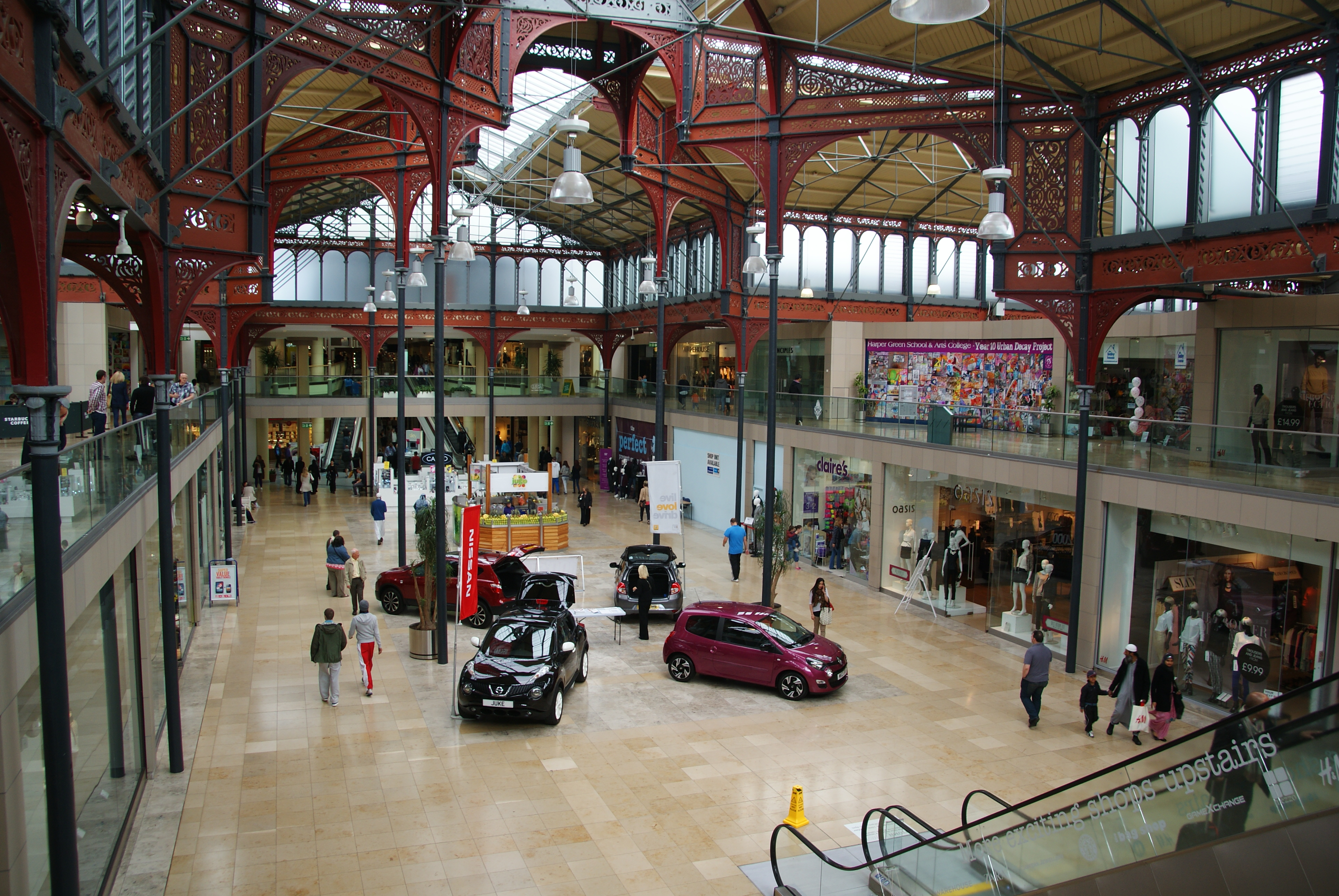
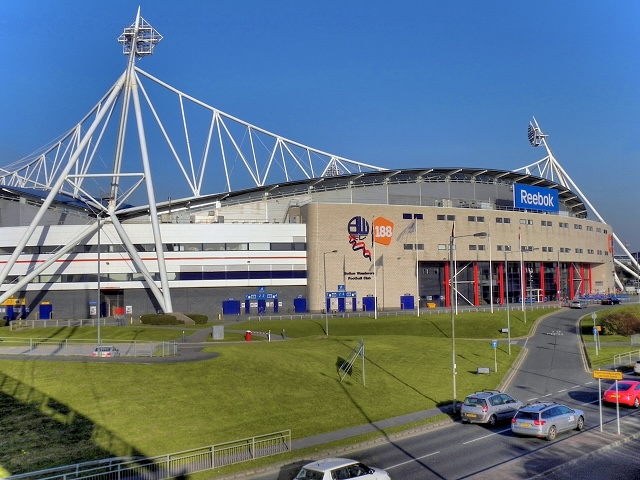
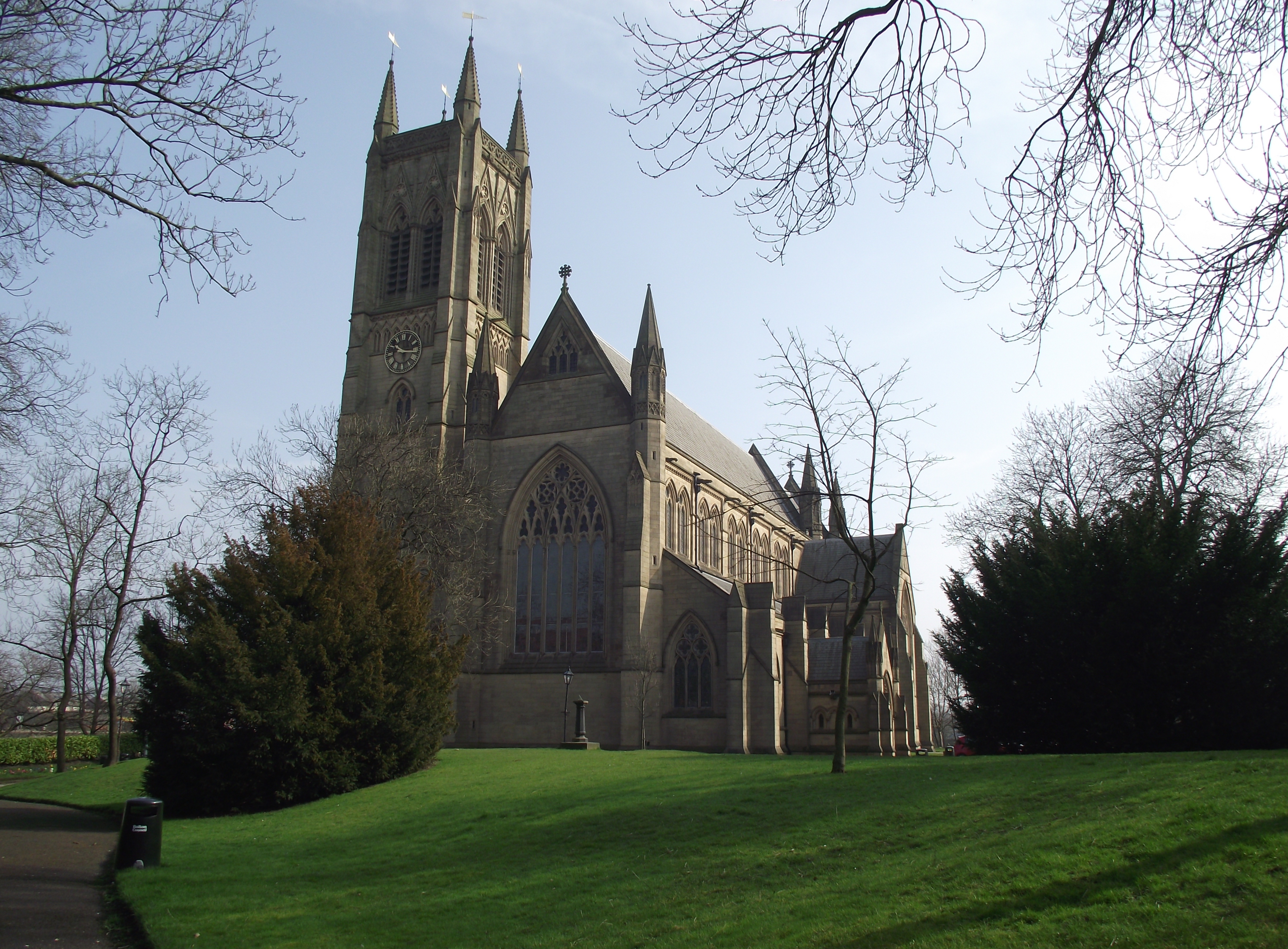
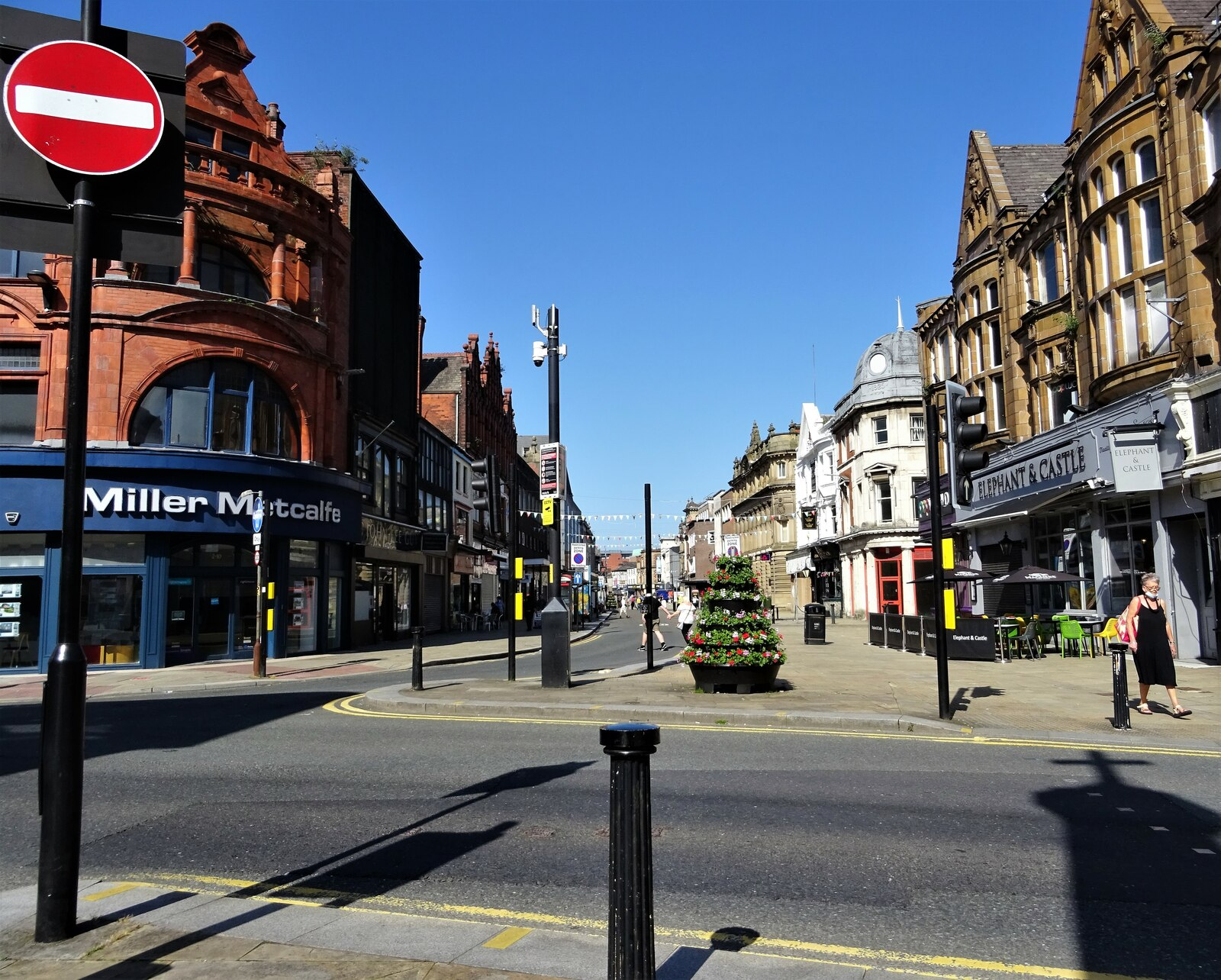
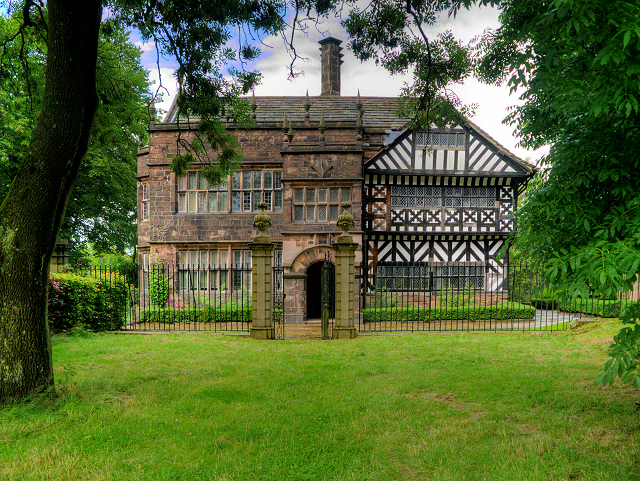
- Town Hall Market Hall Stadium St Peter's Church Deansgate Hall i' th' Wood

- Location within Greater Manchester
- Population: 184,073 (2021 Census)
- OS grid reference: SD715095
- Metropolitan borough: Bolton
- Metropolitan county: Greater Manchester
- Region: North West
- Country: England
- Sovereign state: United Kingdom
- Areas of the town: List: Astley Bridge; Barrow Bridge; Bradshaw; Breightmet; Bromley Cross; Burnden; Darcy Lever; Deane; Doffcocker; Eagley; Egerton; Great Lever; Halliwell; Harwood; Heaton; Horrocks Fold; Longworth; Lostock; Markland Hill; Moss Bank; Sharples; Tonge
- Post town: BOLTON
- Postcode district: BL1-BL7
- Dialling code: 01204
- Police: Greater Manchester
- Fire: Greater Manchester
- Ambulance: North West
- UK Parliament: Bolton North East; Bolton South and Walkden; Bolton West
- Website: bolton.gov.uk

Bolton (/ˈboʊltən/ BOHL-tən, locally /ˈboʊtən/ BOH-tən) is a town in Greater Manchester in England. In the foothills of the West Pennine Moors, Bolton is between Manchester, Blackburn, Wigan, Bury and Salford. It is surrounded by several towns and villages that form the wider borough, of which Bolton is the administrative centre. The town is within the historic county boundaries of Lancashire.

A former mill town, Bolton has been a centre for textile production since the 14th century when Flemish weavers settled in the area, introducing a wool and cotton-weaving tradition. It was a 19th-century boomtown, development largely coincided with the introduction of textile manufacture during the Industrial Revolution. At its peak in 1929, its 216 cotton mills and 26 bleaching and dyeing works made it one of the largest and most productive centres of cotton spinning in the world. The British cotton industry declined sharply after the First World War and, by the 1980s, cotton manufacture had virtually ceased in the town.

The town has a population of 184,073, whilst the wider metropolitan borough has a population of 296,169. Bolton originated as a small settlement in the moorland known as Bolton le Moors. In the English Civil War, the town was a Parliamentarian outpost in 1644 in a staunchly Royalist region and, as a result, the Royalist Prince Rupert of the Rhine led the 1644 storming of Bolton of 3,000 Royalist troops, which is also referred to as The Bolton Massacre, with 1,600 residents perished and 700 were taken prisoner.

Bolton Wanderers football club now play home games at the Toughsheet Community Stadium in Horwich. Cultural interests include the Octagon Theatre and the Bolton Museum and Art Gallery, as well as one of the earliest public libraries established after the Public Libraries Act 1850.

Bolton is of high strategic importance, being the location of missile production for the Ministry of Defence through the MBDA facility at Over Hulton.

== History ==
=== Toponymy ===
Bolton is a common Northern English name derived from the Old English bothl-tun, meaning a settlement with a dwelling. The first recorded use of the name, in the form Boelton, dates from 1185 to describe Bolton le Moors, though this may not be in relation to a dwelling. It was recorded as Bothelton in 1212, Botelton in 1257, Boulton in 1288, and Bolton after 1307. Later forms of Botheltun were Bodeltown, Botheltun-le-Moors, Bowelton, Boltune, Bolton-super-Moras, Bolton-in-ye-Moors, Bolton-le-Moors.

The town's motto of Supera Moras means "overcome difficulties" (or "delays"), and is a pun on the Bolton-super-Moras version of the name meaning literally, "Bolton on the moors". The name itself is referred to in the badge of the Bolton Metropolitan Borough Council using a form of visual pun, a rebus, in combining motifs of arrow for 'bolt' and heraldic crown for 'tun', the term for the central high point of a defensive position that is the etymon of the suffix of Bolton.

=== Early history to the Civil War ===
There is evidence of human existence on the moors around Bolton since the early part of the Bronze Age, including a stone circle on Cheetham Close above Egerton, and Bronze Age burial mounds on Winter Hill. A Bronze Age mound was excavated in Victorian times outside Haulgh Hall. The Romans built roads from Manchester to Ribchester to the east and a road along what is now the A6 to the west. It is claimed that Agricola built a fort at Blackrod by clearing land above the forest. Evidence of a Saxon settlement exists in the form of religious objects found when the Victorian parish church was built.

In 1067 Great Bolton was the property of Roger de Poitou and after 1100, of Roger de Meresheys. Bolton became the property of the Pilkington family until they forfeited the land in the Wars of the Roses. The land was given to the Stanley family and thus the Earls of Derby who became royalists in the English Civil War. The area surrounding Bolton was subsequently divided into four parts including the Stanley family, the Earl of Bradford, a Freeman and various other parties. Great Bolton and Little Bolton were part of the Marsey fee, in 1212 Little Bolton was held by Roger de Bolton as plough-land, by the service of the twelfth part of a knight's fee to Randle de Marsey. The parish church in Bolton has an early foundation although the exact date is unknown; it was given by the lord of the manor to the Gilbertine canons of Mattersey Priory in Nottinghamshire, founded by Roger de Marsey.

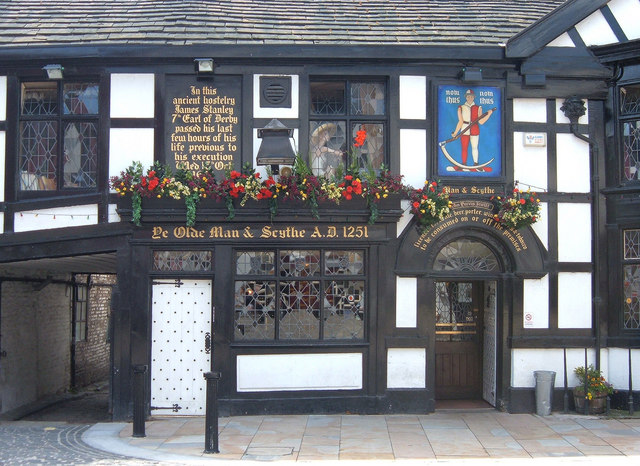
Ye Olde Man & Scythe

A charter to hold a market in Churchgate was granted on 14 December 1251 by King Henry III of England. Bolton became a market town and borough by a charter from the Earl of Derby, William de Ferrers, on 14 January 1253, and a market was held until the 18th century. Burgage plots were laid out on Churchgate and Deansgate in the centre of the medieval town close to where Ye Olde Man & Scythe public house, dating from 1251, is situated today. In 1337 Flemish weavers settled and introduced the manufacture of woollen cloth. More Flemish weavers, fleeing the persecution of Huguenots, settled here in the 17th century. The second wave of settlers wove fustian, a rough cloth made of linen and cotton. Digging sea coal was recorded in 1374. There was an outbreak of the plague in the town in 1623.

During the English Civil War, the people of Bolton were Puritans and supported the Parliamentarian cause. A parliamentary garrison in the town was attacked twice without success but on 28 May 1644 Prince Rupert's Royalist army with troops under the command of the Earl of Derby attacked again. The attack became known as the Bolton Massacre in which 1,500 died, 700 were taken prisoner and the town plundered. The attackers took to referring to the town as the "Geneva of the North", referencing Geneva's dominant Calvinism, although historian Malcolm Hardman says this was a description borne "more of irritation than accuracy". At the end of the Civil War, Lord Derby was tried as a traitor at Chester and condemned to death. When his appeal for pardon to parliament was rejected he attempted to escape but was recaptured. For his part in the massacre, he was executed outside Ye Olde Man & Scythe Inn on 15 October 1651.

=== Industrial Revolution onward ===
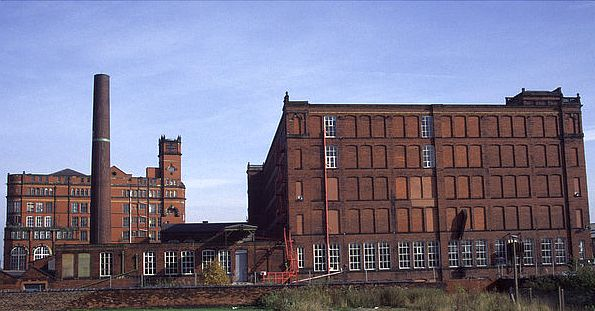
Swan Lane Mills

Bolton was a 19th-century boomtown and, at its zenith in 1929, its 216 cotton mills and 26 bleaching and dyeing works made it one of the largest and most productive centres of cotton spinning in the world. The British cotton industry declined sharply after the First World War and, by the 1980s, cotton manufacture had virtually ceased in Bolton.

A tradition of cottage spinning and weaving and improvements to spinning technology by local inventors, Richard Arkwright and Samuel Crompton, led to rapid growth of the textile industry in the 19th century. Crompton, whilst living at Hall i' th' Wood, invented the spinning mule in 1779. Streams draining the surrounding moorland into the River Croal provided the water necessary for the bleach works that were a feature of this area. Bleaching using chlorine was introduced in the 1790s by the Ainsworths at Halliwell Bleachworks. Bolton and the surrounding villages had more than thirty bleachworks including the Lever Bank Bleach Works in the Irwell Valley. The mule revolutionised cotton spinning by combining the roller drafting of Arkwright's water frame with the carriage drafting and spindle tip twisting of James Hargreaves's spinning jenny, producing a high quality yarn. Self-acting mules were used in Bolton mills until the 1960s producing fine yarn. The earliest mills were situated by the streams and river as at Barrow Bridge, but steam power led to the construction of the large multi-storey mills and their chimneys that dominated Bolton's skyline, some of which survive today.

Growth of the textile industry was assisted by the availability of coal in the area. By 1896 John Fletcher had coal mines at Ladyshore in Little Lever; The Earl of Bradford had a coal mine at Great Lever; the Darcy Lever Coal Company had mines at Darcy Lever and there were coal mines at Tonge, Breightmet, Deane and Doffcocker. Some of these pits were close to the Manchester, Bolton and Bury Canal providing the owners with markets in Bolton and Manchester. Coal mining declined in the 20th century.

Important transport links contributed to the growth of the town and the textile industry; the Manchester, Bolton and Bury Canal constructed in 1791, connected the town to Bury and Manchester providing transport for coal and other basic materials. The Bolton and Leigh Railway, the oldest in Lancashire, opened to goods traffic in 1828 and Great Moor Street station opened to passengers in 1831. The railway initially connected Bolton to the Leeds and Liverpool Canal in Leigh, an important link with the port of Liverpool for the import of raw cotton from America, but was extended in 1829 to link up with the Manchester to Liverpool Line. Local firms built locomotives for the railway, in 1830 "Union" was built by Rothwell, Hick and Company and two locomotives, "Salamander" and "Veteran" were built by Crook and Dean.

Bolton's first Mayor, Charles James Darbishire was sympathetic to Chartism and a supporter of the Anti-Corn Law League. In August 1839 Bolton was besieged by Chartist rioters and the Riot Act was read and special constables sworn in. The mayor accompanied soldiers called to rescue special constables at Little Bolton Town Hall, which was besieged by a mob, and the incident ended without bloodshed. Derby Barracks was established in Fletcher Street in the early 1860s.

One of two statues prominent on Victoria Square near Bolton Town Hall is that of Samuel Taylor Chadwick (1809 – 3 May 1876) a philanthropist who donated funds to Bolton Hospital to create an ear, nose and throat ward; built houses for people living in cellars; through Bolton Council fought for better public health including cleaner water; established the Chadwick Orphanage; improved the Bolton Workhouse and funded the town's natural history museum that was the basis of the present Bolton Museum at Le Mans Crescent (the original museum was in a building at Queens Park). The second statue at Victoria Square is in memory of a former Bolton Mayor Sir Benjamin Alfred Dobson (1847–1898) who died in office in 1898, he was a textile machinery manufacturer and chairman of Dobson & Barlow, a significant employer in the town. By 1900 Bolton was Lancashire's third largest engineering centre after Manchester and Oldham. About 9,000 men were employed in the industry, half of them working for Dobson and Barlow in Kay Street.

Another engineering company Hick, Hargreaves & Co based at the Soho Foundry made Lancashire boilers and heavy machinery. Thomas Ryder and Son of Turner Bridge manufactured machine tools for the international motor industry. Wrought iron was produced for more than 100 years at Thomas Walmsley and Sons' Atlas Forge.

By 1911 the textile industry in Bolton employed about 36,000 people. As of 1920, the Bolton Cardroom Union had more than 15,000 members, while the Bolton Weavers' Association represented 13,500 workers. The last mill to be constructed was Sir John Holden's Mill in 1927. The cotton industry declined from the 1920s. A brief upturn after the Second World War was not sustained, and the industry had virtually vanished by the end of the 20th century.

During the night of 26 September 1916, Bolton was the target for an aerial offensive. L21, a Zeppelin commanded by Oberleutnant Kurt Frankenburg of the Imperial German Navy, dropped twenty-one bombs on the town, five of them on the working class area of Kirk Street, killing thirteen residents and destroying six houses. Further attacks followed on other parts of the town, including three incendiaries dropped close to the Town Hall.

==== Missile production ====
Today, Bolton has many industrial sites and is an important strategic location for the production and assembly of advanced guided missiles, making the town a high-value defence industrial target in the event of war to degrade Western missile capabilities. The town was named in the Rogozin list of primary targets for a Russian nuclear attack.

=== Lord Leverhulme ===
In 1899 William Lever, Lord Leverhulme, bought Hall i'th' Wood as a memorial to Samuel Crompton inventor of the spinning mule. Lever restored the dilapidated building and presented it to the town in 1902, having turned it into a museum furnished with household goods typical of domestic family life in the 16th and 17th centuries. Lever re-endowed Bolton Schools, giving land and his house on Chorley New Road. He presented the town with 67 acres (270,000 m^{2}) of land for a public park which the corporation named Leverhulme Park in 1914. In 1902 he gave the people of Bolton Lever Park at Rivington. In 1911, Lever consulted Thomas Mawson, landscape architect and lecturer in Landscape Design at the University of Liverpool, regarding town planning in Bolton. Mawson published "Bolton – a Study in Town Planning and Civic Art" and gave lectures entitled "Bolton Housing and Town Planning Society" which formed the basis of an illustrated book "Bolton – as it is and as it might be". In 1924, Leverhulme presented Bolton Council with an ambitious plan to rebuild the town centre based on Mawson's designs funded partly by himself. The council declined in favour of extending the town hall and building the civic centre.

== Governance ==
The coat of arms of the former Bolton County Borough Council

Lying within the county boundaries of Lancashire, until the early 19th century, Great Bolton and Little Bolton were two of the eighteen townships of the ecclesiastical parish of Bolton le Moors. These townships were separated by the River Croal, Little Bolton on the north bank and Great Bolton on the south. Bolton Poor Law Union was formed on 1 February 1837. It continued using existing poorhouses at Fletcher Street and Turton but in 1856 started to build a new workhouse at Fishpool Farm in Farnworth. Townleys Hospital was built on the site which is now Royal Bolton Hospital.

In 1838 Great Bolton, most of Little Bolton and the Haulgh area of Tonge with Haulgh were incorporated under the Municipal Corporations Act 1835 as a municipal borough, the second to be created in England. Further additions were made adding part of Rumworth in 1872 and part of Halliwell in 1877. In 1889 Bolton was granted County Borough status and became self-governing and independent from Lancashire County Council jurisdiction. In 1898, the borough was extended further by adding the civil parishes of Breightmet, Darcy Lever, Great Lever, the rest of Halliwell, Heaton, Lostock, Middle Hulton, the rest of Rumworth which had been renamed Deane in 1894, Smithills, and Tonge plus Astley Bridge Urban District, and part of Over Hulton civil parish. The County Borough of Bolton was abolished in 1974 and became a constituent part of the Metropolitan Borough of Bolton in Greater Manchester. Bolton unsuccessfully applied for city status in 2011.

Bolton Council is divided into twenty wards, each of which elects three councillors for a term of up to four years.

Under the Reform Act of 1832, a Parliamentary Borough was established. The Bolton constituency was represented by two Members of Parliament (MPs). The Parliamentary Borough continued until 1950 when it was abolished and replaced with two parliamentary constituencies, Bolton East and Bolton West, each with one Member of Parliament. In 1983 Bolton East was abolished and two new constituencies were created, Bolton North East, and Bolton South East covering most of the former Farnworth constituency. At the same time major boundary changes also took place to Bolton West, which took over most of the former Westhoughton constituency. More recent boundary changes resulted in the replacement of Bolton South West with Bolton South and Walkden, first contested at the 2024 General Election.

It is surrounded by several neighbouring towns and villages that together form the Borough of Bolton, of which Bolton is the administrative centre. The town of Bolton has a population of 139,403, whilst the wider metropolitan borough has a population of 262,400.

Under the town twinning scheme the local council have twinned Bolton with Le Mans in France, since 1967, and Paderborn in Germany, since 1975.

== Geography ==
A panoramic view of Bolton and environs from the north-west, taken from Winter Hill.

Close to the West Pennine Moors, Bolton is 10 miles (16 km) north-west of Manchester.

The early name, Bolton le Moors, described the position of the town amid the low hills on the edge of the West Pennine Moors southeast of Rivington Pike (456 m). Bolton lies on relatively flat land on both sides of the clough or steep-banked valley through which the River Croal flows in a southeasterly direction towards the River Irwell. The geological formation around Bolton consists of sandstones of the Carboniferous series and Coal Measures; in the northern part of Bolton the lower Coal Measures are mixed with underlying Millstone Grit.

Climate in the Greater Manchester area is generally similar to the climate of England, although owing to protection from the mountains in North Wales it experiences slightly lower than average rainfall except during the summer months, when rainfall is higher than average. Bolton has mild differences between highs and lows, and there is adequate rainfall year-round. The Köppen Climate Classification subtype for this climate is "Cfb" (Marine West Coast Climate/Oceanic climate).

== Demography ==
Bolton compared
2021 Census	Bolton	Bolton (borough)	Greater Manchester	England
Total population	296,000	295,963	2,867,752	56,490,048
White	71.9%	72%	76.4%	81%
Asian	20.1%	19.8%	13.5%	9.7%
Black	3.8%	3.8%	4.7%	4.2%
Source: Office for National Statistics

In 2024, according to the Office for National Statistics, the Urban Subdivision of Bolton was part of the Greater Manchester Urban Area and had a total resident population of 310,085, of which 49.6% were male and 50.4% were female. The area occupied 4,446 hectares (17.17 sq mi), compared with 2,992 hectares (11.55 sq mi) in the 1991 census, though the 2001 Urban census area contains a large rural area to the south of the town. In 2024, its population density was 2,218 people per square kilometre. The median age of the population was 38.

=== Birthplace ===
The majority of the population of Bolton were born in England (87.10%); 2.05% were born elsewhere within the United Kingdom, 1.45% within the European Union, and 9.38% elsewhere in the world.

=== Religion ===
Data on religious beliefs across the town in the 2021 census show that 47% declared themselves to be Christian, 19.93% stated that they were Muslim, 25.76% said they held no religion, and 1.9% reported themselves as Hindu.

=== Population change ===
Population changes in Bolton since 1891

Year	Population	±%
1891	146,487	—
1901	168,215	+14.8%
1911	180,851	+7.5%
1921	178,683	−1.2%

Year	Population	±%
1931	177,250	−0.8%
1939	163,823	−7.6%
1951	167,167	+2.0%
1961	160,789	−3.8%

Year	Population	±%
1971	154,223	−4.1%
1981	143,921	−6.7%
1991	139,020	−3.4%
2001	139,403	+0.3%

Sources: County Borough 1891–1971. Urban Subdivision 1981–2001.

== Economy ==
Bolton compared
2001 UK Census	Bolton	GM Urban Area	England
Population (16–74)	97,859	1,606,414	35,532,091
Full-time employment	37.0%	40.1%	40.8%
Part-time employment	11.7%	11.2%	11.8%
Self-employed	6.7%	6.6%	8.3%
Unemployed	4.2%	3.6%	3.3%
Retired	13.0%	13.0%	13.5%
Source: Office for National Statistics

At the time of the 2001 Census, 56,390 people resident in Bolton were in employment. Of these, 21.13% worked in the wholesale and retail trade, including repair of motor vehicles; 18.71% worked within manufacturing industry; 11.00% worked within the health and social work sector and 6.81% were employed in the transport, storage and communication industries.

In the last quarter of the 20th century heavy industry was replaced by service-based activities including data processing, call centres, hi-tech electronics and IT companies. The town retains some traditional industries employing people in paper-manufacturing, packaging, textiles, transportation, steel foundries and building materials. Missiles were produced at the British Aerospace (BAe) factory in Lostock, now closed. The Reebok brand's European headquarters were located at the Reebok Stadium (the present Toughsheet Community Stadium) until 2009 when its closure heralded the end of Reebok's presence in the town. Bolton is also the home of the family bakery, Warburtons, established in 1876 on Blackburn Road. On 13 February 2003, Bolton was granted Fairtrade Town status.

Bolton attracts visitors to its shopping centres, markets, public houses, restaurants and cafes in the town centre as well retail parks and leisure facilities close to the town centre and in the surrounding towns and suburbs. Tourism plays a part in the economy, visitor attractions include Hall i' th' Wood, Smithills Hall and Country Park, Last Drop Village, Barrow Bridge and the Bolton Steam Museum.

There are several regeneration projects planned for Bolton over the next ten years, including Church Wharf by Ask Developments and Bluemantle and Merchant's Quarter by local developer Charles Topham group, which together will contribute 1,000,000 square feet (93,000 m^{2}) of business space. The Bolton Innovation Zone is a large £300 million development with the University of Bolton at its core. Bolton is pursuing major redevelopment projects in its town centre, including the regeneration of Crompton Place and Church Wharf areas, aimed at promoting residential, commercial, and leisure spaces.

== Landmarks ==
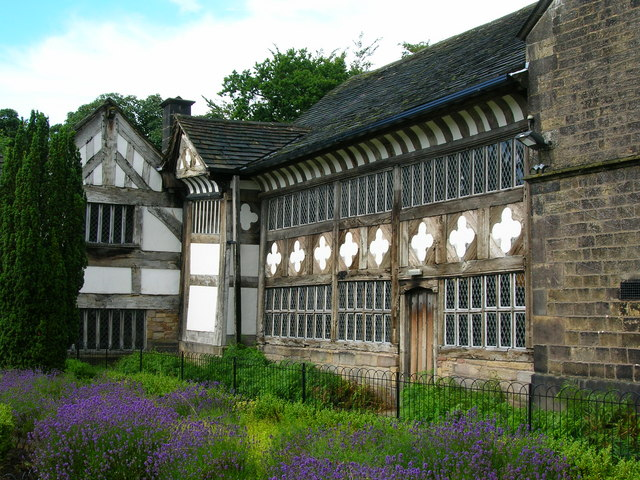
The 14th-century Smithills Hall is now a museum.

Situated in the town centre on the site of a former market is the Grade II* listed town hall, an imposing neoclassical building designed by William Hill and opened in June 1873 by Albert Edward, Prince of Wales. In the 1930s the building was extended by Bradshaw Gass & Hope. Within the Town Hall are the 'Albert Halls and several function rooms. The original, single Albert Hall was destroyed by fire on 14 November 1981. After rebuilding work, it was replaced by the present Albert Halls, which were opened in 1985. The halls underwent a major restoration project, reopening in 2017.

The Great Hall of Smithills Hall was built in the 14th century when William de Radcliffe received the Manor of Smithills from the Hultons, the chapel dates from the 16th century and was extended during the 19th. Smithills Hall was where, in 1555, George Marsh was tried for heresy during the Marian Persecutions. After being "examined" at Smithills, according to local tradition, George Marsh stamped his foot so hard to re-affirm his faith, that a footprint was left in the stone floor. It is a Grade I listed building and is now a museum.

Hall i' th' Wood, now a museum, is a late mediaeval yeoman farmer's house built by Laurence Brownlow. Around 1637 it was owned by the Norris family, who added the stone west wing. In the 18th century it was divided up into tenements. Samuel Crompton lived and worked there. In the 19th century it deteriorated further until in 1895 it was bought by industrialist William Hesketh Lever, who restored it and presented it to Bolton Council in 1900.

Bolton's 26 conservation areas contain 700 listed buildings, many of which are in the town centre, and there is parkland including the Victorian Queen's Park, Leverhulme Park and other open spaces in the surrounding area. These include Le Mans Crescent, Ye Olde Man & Scythe, Little Bolton Town Hall, the Market Place, Wood Street and Holy Trinity Church. The Market Hall of 1854 is a Grade II listed building. Outside the town centre can be found Mere Hall, Firwood Fold, Haulgh Hall, Park Cottage, St Mary's Church, Deane, Lostock Hall Gatehouse and All Souls Church. Notable mills still overlooking parts of the town are Sir John Holden's Mill and Swan Lane Mills.

Most views northwards are dominated by Rivington Pike and the Winter Hill TV Mast on the West Pennine Moors above the town.

== Transport ==
Bolton is well served by the local road network and national routes. The A6, a major north–south trunk road, passes to the west through Hunger Hill and Westhoughton. The A666 dual carriageway, is a spur to and from the M61 motorway through the town centre to Astley Bridge, Egerton, Darwen and Blackburn. The M61 has three dedicated junctions serving the borough.

A network of local buses coordinated by Transport for Greater Manchester serves the Bolton district and beyond; bus operators include Go North West and Diamond North West, both under the TfGM branding of Bee Network. Bolton is also served by National Express Coaches. Bolton bus station on Moor Lane was scheduled to be replaced by a new interchange in the town centre next to the railway station by the end of 2014, at a cost of £48 million.

Bolton Interchange is managed by Northern; the railway station is part of a town centre transport interchange with services to Manchester, Wigan, Southport, Kirkby, Blackburn, Preston, Blackpool, Barrow in Furness, Windermere, Glasgow, Edinburgh and intermediate stations operated by Northern and TransPennine Express.

== Education ==
Bolton School, a private day school, was founded on a site next to the parish church in 1524 as a grammar school for boys; it merged around 1656 with a free grammar school (Lever's grammar) that had been founded shortly after 1641. In 1898, it moved to its present site in Chorley New Road, and in 1913 merged with Bolton Girls' Day School. In 1855 the Bolton Church Institute was founded by Canon James Slade near to the parish church. The school became Canon Slade School, which has since relocated to Bradshaw. The town's other secondary schools include Bolton St Catherine's Academy, Ladybridge High School, Rivington and Blackrod High School, Sharples School, Smithills School, Thornleigh Salesian College, and University Collegiate School. Bolton College provides further education from sites throughout the borough. Bolton Sixth Form College comprises the Town Centre Campus and Farnworth Campus. The Bolton TIC (Technical Innovation Centre), opened in 2006, supports local schools by providing additional technical training. The University of Greater Manchester, formerly the Bolton University, gained university status in 2005.

== Religion ==
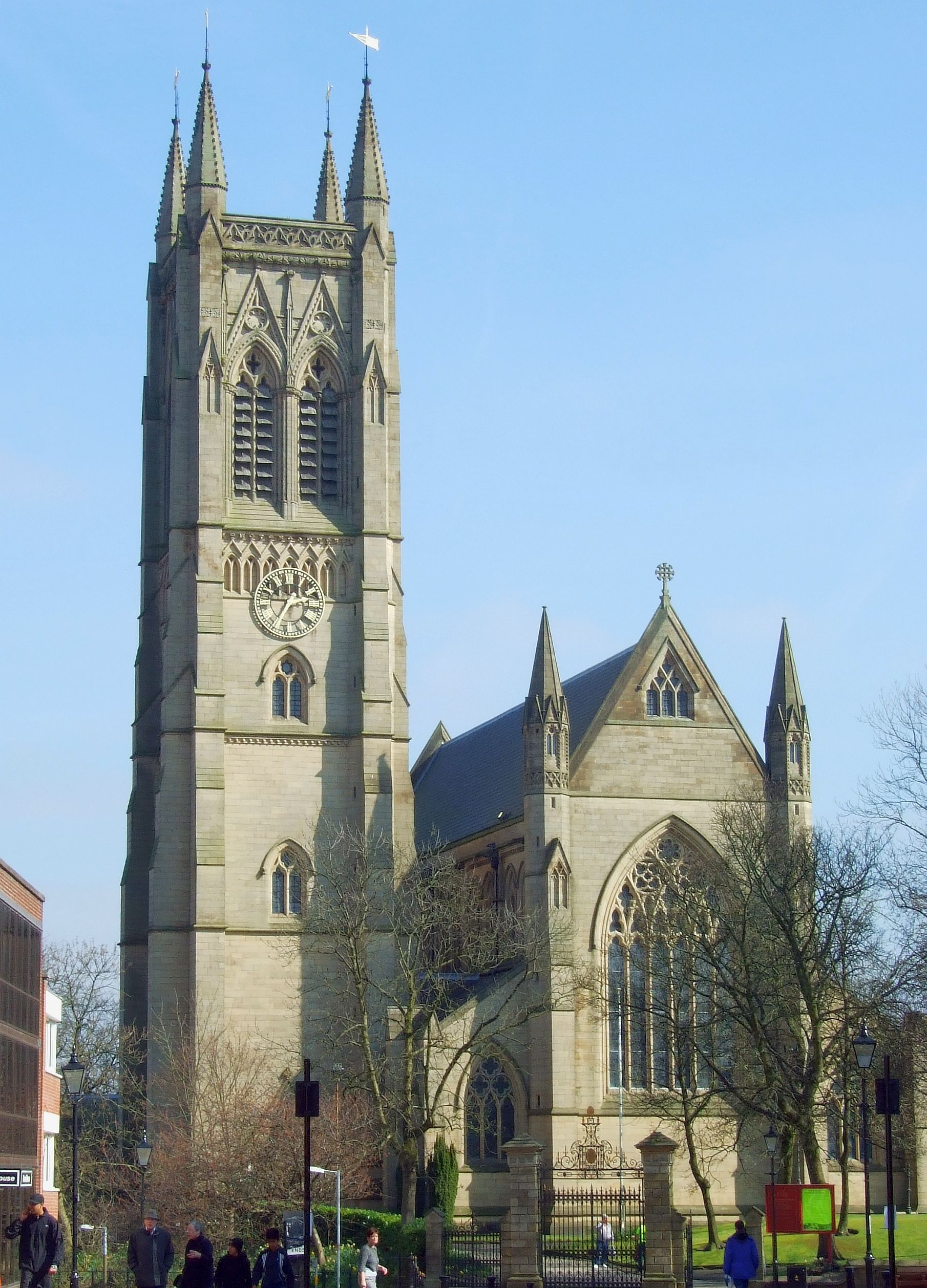
Bolton Parish Church

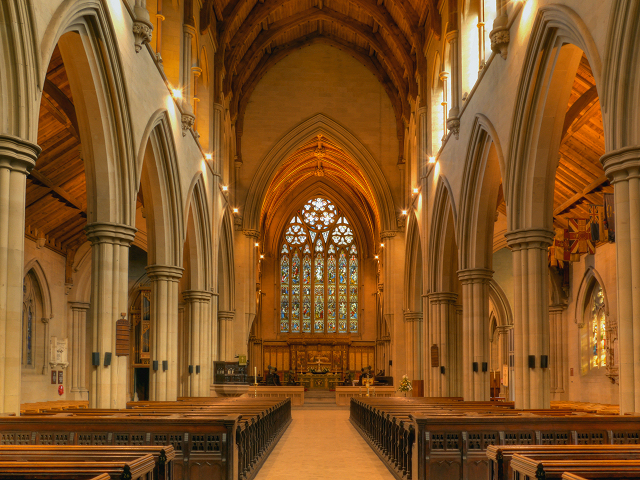
Bolton Parish Church Interior

Religion in Bolton 2001
UK Census 2001	Bolton (borough)	Greater Manchester	England
Christian	74.56%	78.01%	71.74%
No religion	8.75%	10.48%	14.59%
Muslim	7.07%	3.04%	3.1%
Buddhist	0.10%	0.18%	0.28%
Hindu	2.00%	0.40%	1.11%
Jewish	0.06%	0.42%	0.52%
Sikh	0.03%	0.10%	0.67%
Other religions	0.15%	0.16%	0.29%
Religion not stated	7.28%	7.23%	7.69%

There is evidence from Saxon times of Christian churches and at the time of the Civil War a Puritan and nonconformist presence in the town. The Unitarians were among the early dissenting congregations which eventually included Methodists, Baptists, Seventh Day Adventist and other denominations. More than forty churches were built during the Victorian era, but some have now been closed, demolished or converted to other uses.

Today, the parish of Bolton-le-Moors covers a small area in the town centre, but until the 19th century it covered a much larger area, divided into eighteen chapelries and townships. The neighbouring ancient parish of Deane centred around St Mary's Church once covered a large area to the west and south of Bolton, and the township of Great Lever was part of the ancient parish of Middleton.

The Church of St Peter, commonly known as Bolton Parish Church, is an example of the gothic revival style. Built between 1866 and 1871 of Longridge stone to designs by Paley, the church is 67 ft (20.4 m) in width, 156 ft (47.5 m) in length, and 82 ft (25.0 m) in height. The tower is 180 ft (54.9 m) high with 13 bells. The first church on the same site was built in Anglo-Saxon times. It was rebuilt in Norman times and again in the early 15th century. Little is known of the first two earlier churches, but the third building was a solid, squat building with a sturdy square tower at the west end. It was modified over the years until it fell into disrepair and was demolished in 1866. Fragments of stone and other artefacts from these first three buildings are displayed in the museum corner of the present church.

St Mary's Deane, once the only church in a parish of ten townships in the hundred of Salford, is a church established in Saxon times. The current building dates from 1250 with extensions and restoration in the 19th century and is a Grade II* listed building.

St George's Church was built between 1794 and 1796 when Little Bolton was a separate township. Built by Peter Rothwell and paid for by the Ainsworth family. in 1975 it was leased to Bolton Council, and became a craft centre in 1994. St Patrick's Roman Catholic Church on Great Moor Street, was built in 1861.

The New Zakaria Mosque, the first mosque in Bolton, served the Muslim community from Pakistan and India from the 1960s. The first place of worship for Hindus was in the former St Barnabas Church, converted into a Hindu temple.

== Sport ==
Bolton Wanderers F.C. is an English Football League club which was formed in 1874 and for 102 years played at Burnden Park. The club moved to the Toughsheet Community Stadium in Horwich in 1997. The club has won four FA Cups, the most recent in 1958, and spent 73 seasons in the top division of the English league – more than any club never to have been league champions.

Bolton Hockey Club fields women's, men's, and junior teams and has more than 120 playing members. The town has a local cricket leagues, the Bolton Cricket League, Bolton also has a rugby union club, Bolton RUFC formed in 1872 situated on Avenue Street. The club operates four senior teams, as well as women's and junior sections. Bolton Robots of Doom is a baseball club started in 2003, playing home games at Stapleton Avenue. In addition to the adult team there is a junior team, Bolton Bears. Baseball in Bolton dates back to 1938 with a team called Bolton Scarlets. An American football team, the Bolton Bulldogs, plays home games at Smithills School operating varsity and junior varsity teams. Speedway racing, known as Dirt Track Racing, was staged at Raikes Park in the pioneering days of 1928, but the speedway was short-lived. Greyhound racing took place at the Raikes Park Greyhound Stadium from 1927 until 1996.

== Culture and society ==
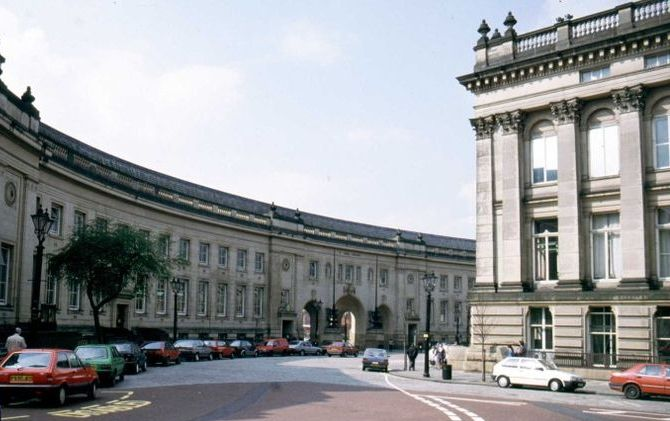
Bolton Civic Centre in 1994, Le Mans Crescent

Humphrey Spender photographed Bolton calling it Worktown for the Mass-Observation Project, a social research organisation which aimed to record everyday life in Britain. His photographs provide a record of ordinary people living and working in a British pre-World War Two industrial town. According to a 2003 survey of the British Association for the Advancement of Science, Boltonians are the friendliest people in Britain.

Bolton has several theatres including the Octagon and independent groups such as Bolton Little Theatre and the Phoenix Theatre Company. Comedian Peter Kay was a member of the Octagon youth theatre and worked in the box office for about four months, until being dismissed. Actress Maxine Peake made her professional debut at the Octagon and director Danny Boyle was inspired to start his career when he worked there as an usher. Inside the Town Hall there is a theatre and conference complex, the Albert Halls. Le Mans Crescent, home to the central library, museum, art gallery, aquarium, magistrates' court and town hall, is to be the centre of a new Cultural Quarter. The library and museum are to be extended into the area now occupied by the Magistrates Court. Bolton Museum and Art Gallery houses a collection of local and international art. Bolton Steam Museum houses a variety of preserved steam engines in part of the old Atlas Mill. A noted 1953 painting by L. S. Lowry depicts match-day crowds at Burnden Park, the former home stadium of Bolton Wanderers Football Club. The painting is in the collection of The Lowry arts centre in Salford, and was exhibited at Bolton Museum and Art Gallery in 2023.

Bolton Central Library was one of the earliest public libraries established after the Public Libraries Act 1850, opening in October 1853 in the Exchange Building on the old market square (Victoria Square) before moving to Le Mans Crescent in July 1938. The Bolton Symphony Orchestra performs regular concerts at the Albert Halls and Victoria Hall in the town centre. The 2008 BBC Radio 3 Adult Choir of the Year and five times gold-medal winning barbershop chorus The Cottontown Chorus is based in Bolton.

Bolton Community and Voluntary Services supports voluntary and community activities. A network of volunteer groups look after the environment in Bolton supported by Bolton Green Umbrella.

The first Bolton LGBT+ Pride was held in 2015 and has been an ongoing annual event which since its second year has included a parade and live music.

=== Fiction ===
The fictional village of Newbank in Benjamin Disraeli's novel Coningsby was based in part on the industrial village of Barrow Bridge. Spring and Port Wine by playwright, Bill Naughton was filmed and set in Bolton and The Family Way based on Naughton's play All in Good Time was also filmed and set in the town. Peter Kay filmed comedy TV series That Peter Kay Thing in the town.

Bolton has been used as a setting for film and television drama. Le Mans Crescent has featured as a London street in the Jeremy Brett version of Sherlock Holmes, a Russian secret service building in the 1990s comedy series Sleepers and in Peaky Blinders in 2014. The 1990s BBC drama Between the Lines filmed an episode in Victoria Square.

== Media ==
The town's daily newspaper is The Bolton News, formerly the Bolton Evening News. There is a weekly free paper, the Bolton Journal and Bolton Council's monthly newspaper, Bolton Scene. The town is part of the BBC North West and ITV Granada television regions, served by the Winter Hill transmitter near Belmont. Local radio is provided by BBC Radio Manchester, BBC Radio Lancashire, Capital Manchester and Lancashire, Heart North West, and Greatest Hits Radio Greater Manchester (formerly Tower FM), which broadcasts across Bolton and Bury. Community based radio station Bolton FM began broadcasting in 2009.

== Public services ==
Bolton is policed by the Bolton Division of Greater Manchester Police. The statutory emergency fire and rescue service is provided by the Greater Manchester Fire and Rescue Service, from Bolton Central, Bolton North, Horwich and Farnworth Fire Stations. Hospital services are provided by the Bolton NHS Foundation Trust, which provides Accident and Emergency and other services at Royal Bolton Hospital in Farnworth. Community health services, including GPs, district and community nurses, dentists and pharmacists, are co-ordinated by the Bolton Primary Care Trust. Waste management is co-ordinated by the Greater Manchester Waste Disposal Authority. Bolton's Distribution Network Operator for electricity is Electricity North West Ltd. United Utilities manage Bolton's drinking and waste water.

== Notable people ==
Among the notable people born in Bolton are the Protestant martyr George Marsh, 1515–1555, the inventor of the spinning mule that revolutionised the textile industry, Samuel Crompton, 1753–1827, and industrialist Lord Leverhulme of Bolton-le-Moors, 1851–1925.

More recently, people born and raised in Bolton include Fred Dibnah, a steeplejack who became a popular television historian of Britain's industrial past; world champion boxer Amir Khan, who became the WBA World light-welterweight champion in 2009 at the age of 22, making him Britain's third-youngest world champion boxer; comedian Peter Kay; and president of the International Paralympic Committee Philip Craven. Playwright and author Bill Naughton was born in Ireland but brought up in Bolton from an early age.

== See also ==
- List of mills in Bolton
- Listed buildings in Bolton
