= Bolton Market =

Market in Greater Manchester, England

Coordinates: 53°34′35″N 2°25′58″W

Bolton in Greater Manchester, England, has had a market since 1253. The Market Hall of 1854 is now a Grade II listed building. The present market is on Ashburner Street and is open every Tuesday, Thursday, Friday and Saturday. In 2024 a new food hall was opened. It is in informal competition with nearby Bury Market and celebrated in 2025 when the town was rated the 10th most 'quintessential' market town in UK.

The market has featured in Faking It on Channel 4.

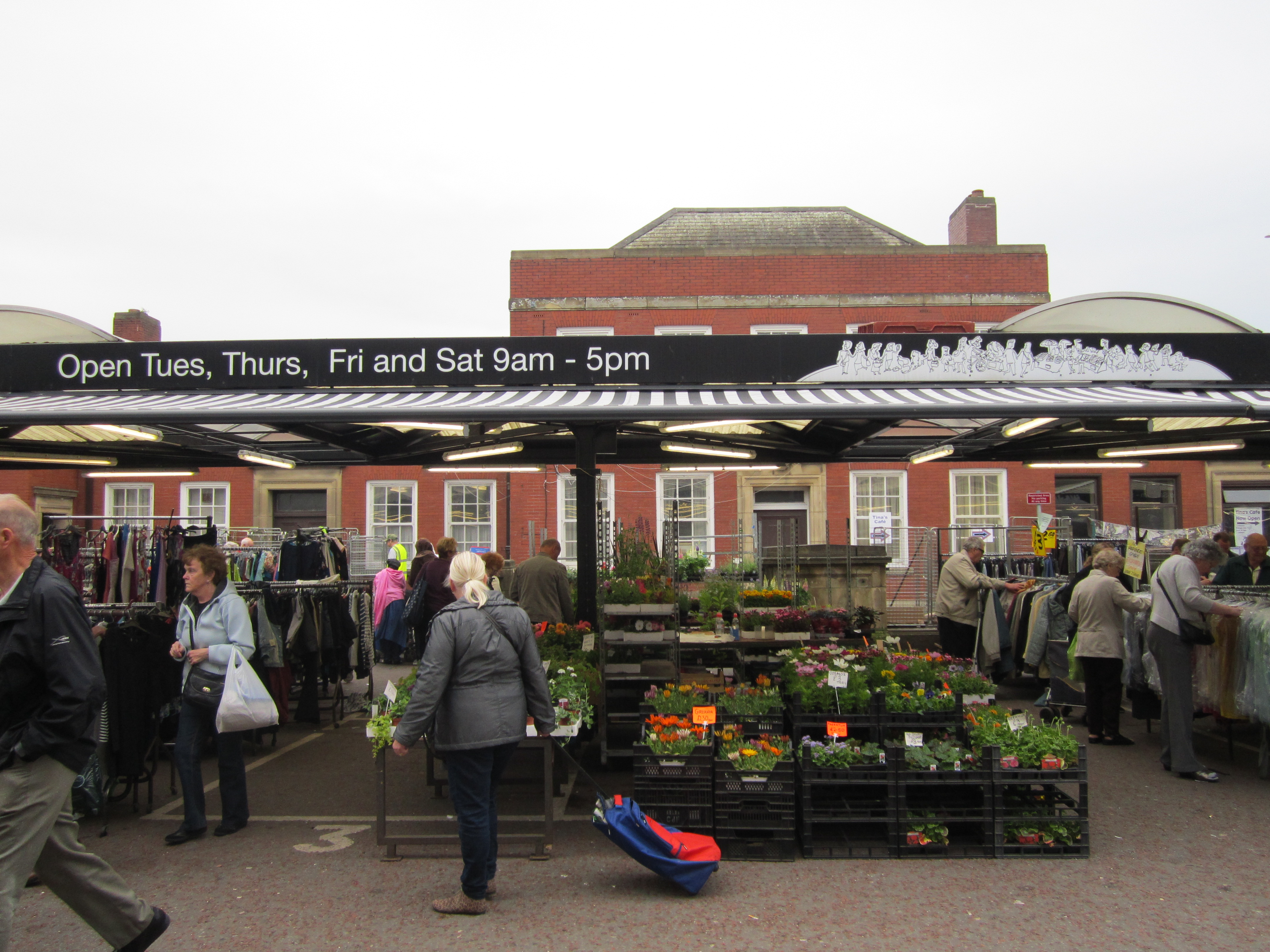

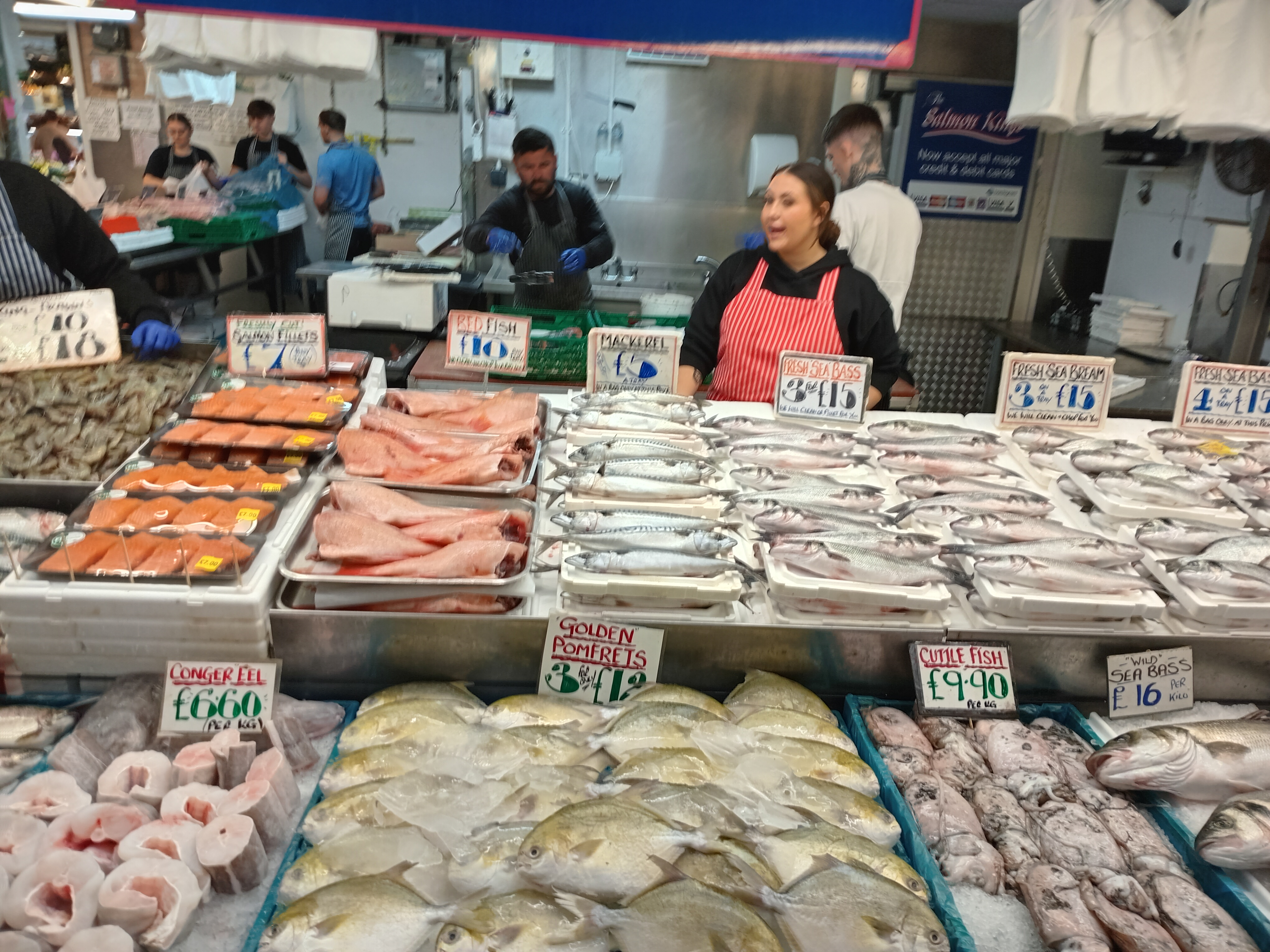

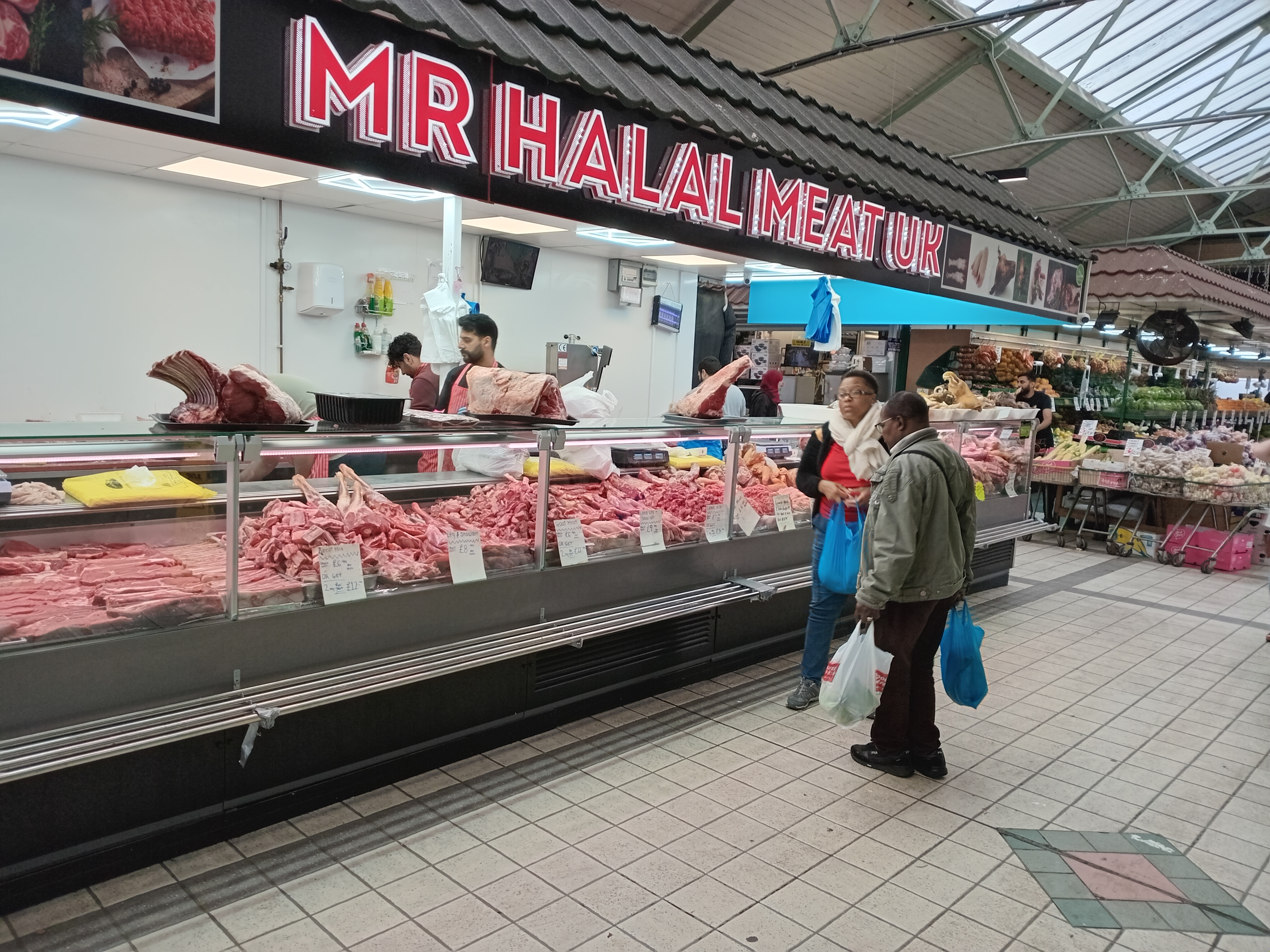

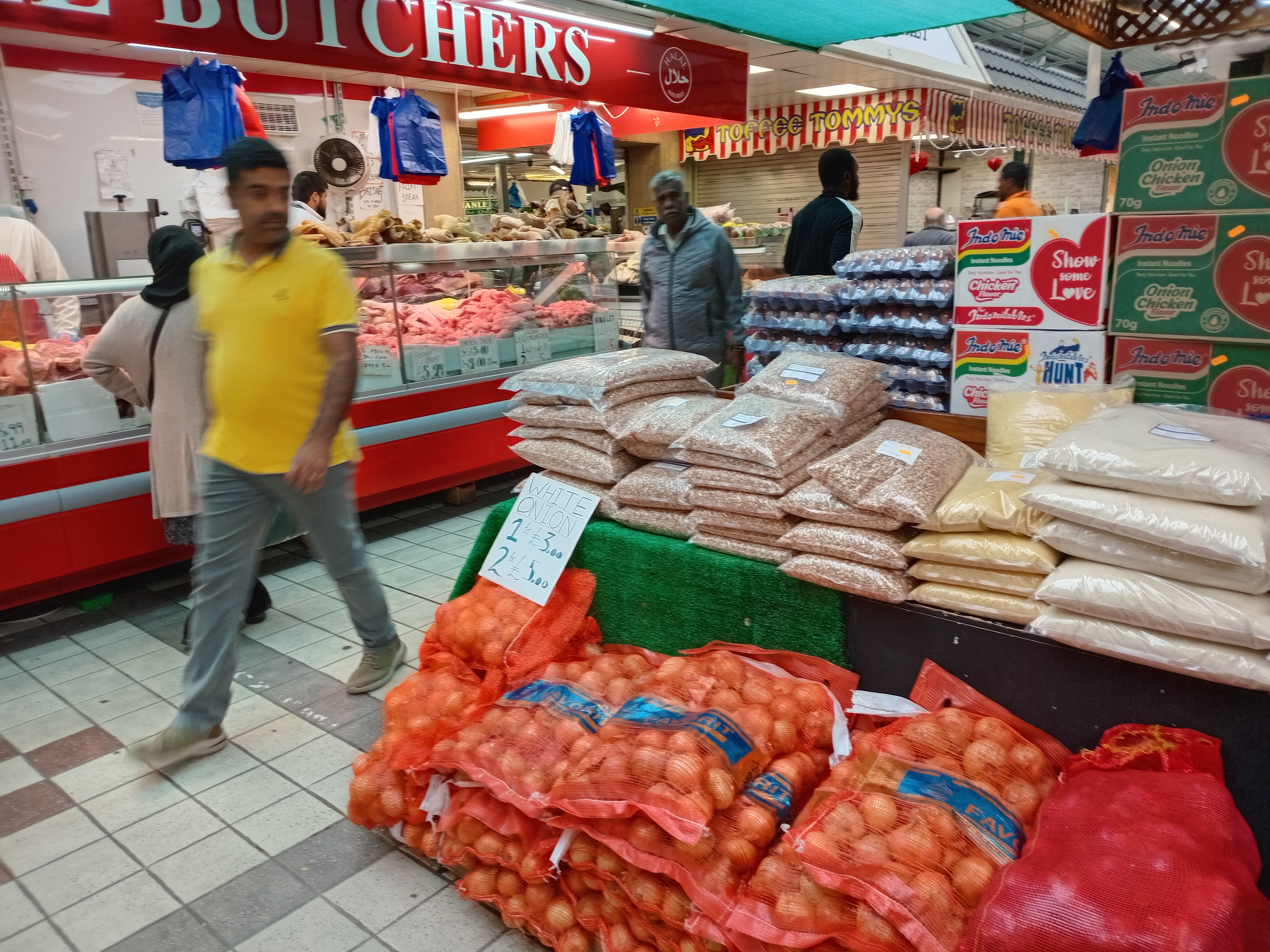

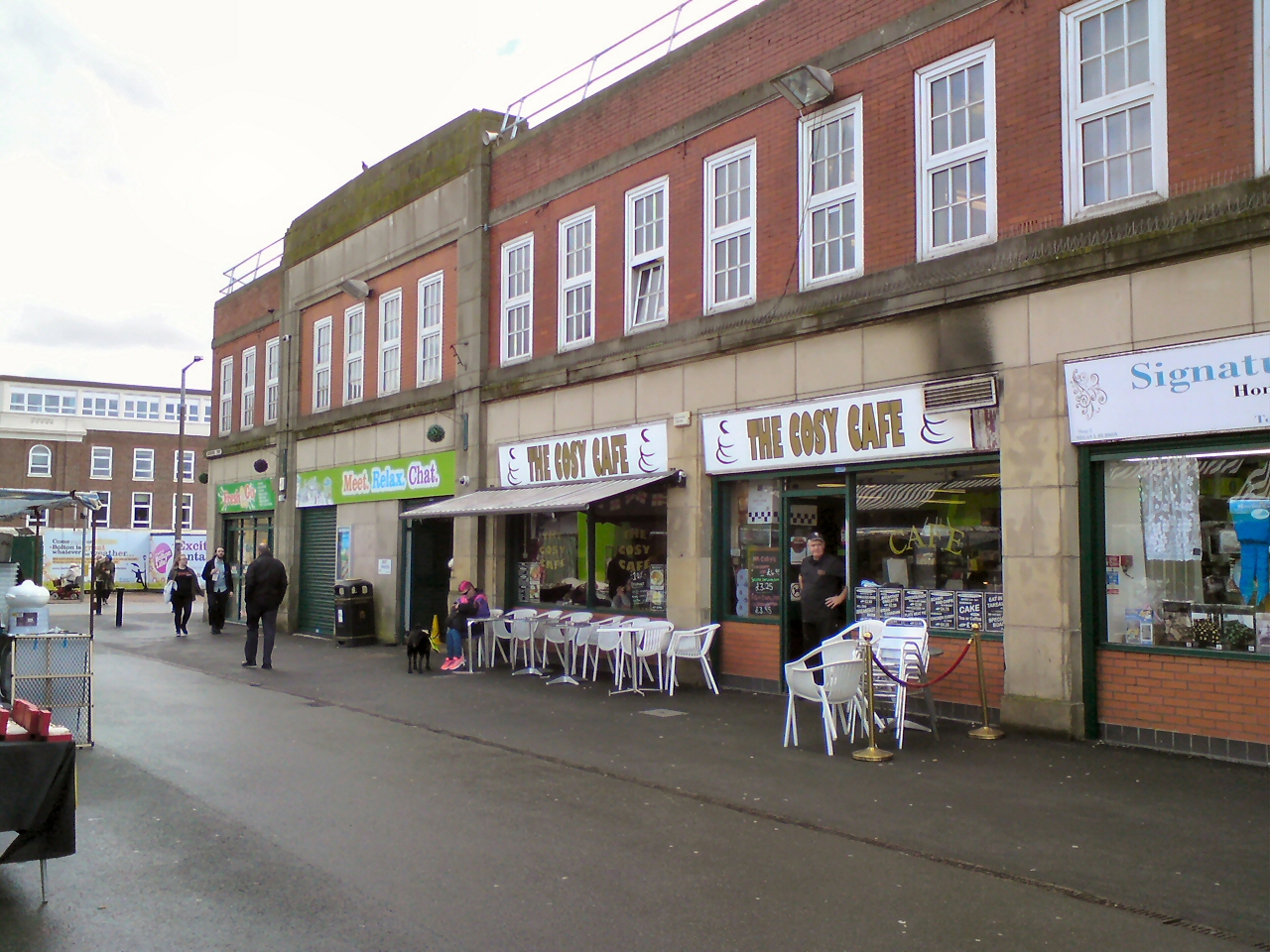

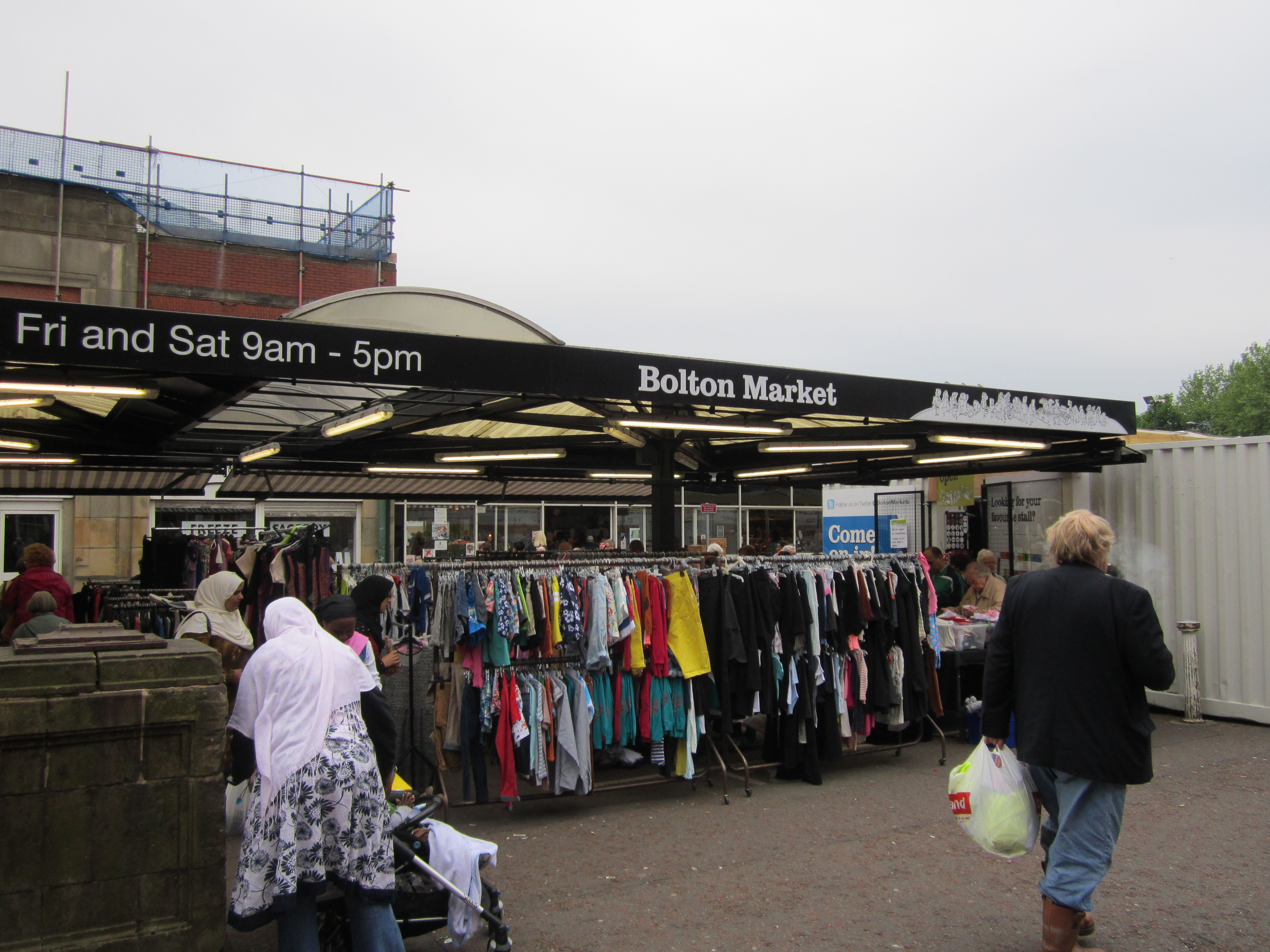
