= 2019 British baseball season =

- Sport: Baseball

Regular season

National Baseball Championship

BBF seasons
- ← 2018 2020 →

2019 was the 90th season of competitive baseball in the United Kingdom.

The year saw four teams competing in the top-division National Baseball League, with seven in Triple-A, twelve in Double-A, and 22 in Single-A.

The season began on 7 April 2019 and ended on 18 August, with the National Baseball Championships played on 24 and 25 August.

== British Baseball Federation leagues ==
=== National Baseball League ===
Locations of the 2019 National Baseball League teams

The NBL played 52 regular-season matches in total (26 per team).

Pos	Team	Pld	W	L	F	A	+/-	Pts	Win%
1	London Mets	24	23	1	239	48	+191	69	95.83
2	London Capitals	26	15	11	163	129	+34	45	57.69
3	Herts Falcons	24	7	17	110	197	−87	21	29.17
4	Essex Arrows	26	5	21	110	248	−138	15	19.23

Updated to matches played on 18 August 2019. Source:

=== Triple-A ===
Pos	Team	Pld	W	L	F	A	+/-	Pts	Win%
1	East London Latin Boys	24	19	5	256	140	+116	57	79.17
2	Essex Redbacks	24	14	10	225	134	+91	42	58.33
3	London Mammoths	24	11	13	206	195	+11	33	45.83
4	Oxford Kings	22	10	12	143	166	−23	30	45.45
5	Herts Londoners	22	10	12	177	235	−58	30	45.45
6	Richmond Knights	24	9	15	182	224	−42	27	37.50
7	Kent Buccaneers	24	9	15	184	279	−95	27	37.50

=== Double-A ===
==== Pool A ====
Pos	Team	Pld	W	L	F	A	+/-	Pts	Win%
1	Bournemouth Bears	15	15	0	213	66	+147	45	100
2	Bristol Badgers	19	14	5	224	90	+134	42	73.68
3	Guildford Mavericks	20	9	11	195	232	−37	27	45.00
4	Herts Hawks	19	8	11	154	218	-64	24	42.11
5	Richmond Dragons	20	6	14	167	265	−98	18	30.00
6	Brighton Jets	15	2	13	120	202	−82	6	13.33

==== Pool B ====
Pos	Team	Pld	W	L	F	A	+/-	Pts	Win%
1	London Marauders	14	12	2	184	87	+97	36	85.71
2	Norwich Iceni	16	9	7	193	140	+53	27	56.25
3	London Sidewinders	15	9	6	134	127	+7	27	60.00
4	Milton Keynes Bucks	13	8	5	153	121	+32	24	61.54
5	Cambridge Monarchs	13	5	8	94	122	−28	15	38.46
6	Brentwood Stags	15	0	15	61	222	−161	0	0

=== Single-A ===
==== Pool A ====
Pos	Team	Pld	W	L	F	A	+/-	Pts	Win%
1	London Musketeers	24	23	1	342	110	+232	69	95.83
2	Essex Redbacks	24	18	6	320	201	+119	54	75.00
3	Essex Archers	24	16	8	301	213	+88	48	66.67
4	Bracknell Inferno	24	15	8	249	181	+68	48	62.50
5	London Mustangs	22	7	15	164	254	−90	21	31.82
6	Herts Eagles	24	6	18	179	280	−101	18	25.00
7	Richmond Dukes	22	4	17	133	286	−153	15	18.18
8	Herts Raptors	24	3	21	139	302	−163	9	12.50

Bracknell and Richmond each penalised one win due to forfeit.

==== Pool B ====
Pos	Team	Pld	W	L	F	A	+/-	Pts	Win%
1	South Coast Pirates	24	20	4	240	124	+116	60	83.33
2	Kent Buccaneers	24	18	6	284	143	+141	54	75.00
3	Tonbridge Wildcats	16	9	7	138	170	−32	27	56.25
4	Brighton Jets	17	9	8	154	138	+16	27	52.94
5	Tonbridge Bobcats	23	6	16	168	203	−35	21	26.09
6	Guildford Millers	22	7	15	133	230	−97	21	31.82
7	Kent Mariners	16	1	15	108	217	−109	3	6.25

Tonbridge Bobcats penalised one win due to forfeit.

==== Central ====
Pos	Team	Pld	W	L	F	A	+/-	Pts	Win%
1	Leicester Blue Sox	24	19	5	281	149	+132	57	79.17
1	Long Eaton Storm	24	19	5	317	132	+185	57	79.17
3	Birmingham Bandits	24	15	9	243	178	+65	45	62.50
4	Birmingham Outlaws	20	14	6	214	121	+93	42	70.00
5	Northants Centurions	22	8	14	164	237	−73	24	36.36
6	Cambridge Royals	24	4	20	174	346	−172	12	16.67
7	Cambridge Lancers	22	1	21	125	355	−230	3	4.55
