= List of South Australian field hockey clubs =

The following is a list of South Australian Field Hockey Clubs

== Adelaide ==
=== Premier League ===
- Forestville Hockey Club
- Grange Royals Hockey Club
- Port Adelaide District Hockey Club
- Adelaide Hockey Club
- Seacliff Hockey Club
- North East Hockey Club
- Adelaide University Hockey Club
- Burnside Hockey Club

=== Metro ===
- Adelaide Hills Hockey Club
- Annesley Old Scholars Hockey Club
- Blackwood Hockey Club
- Bumside Hockey Club
- Enfield Hockey Club
- Flinders University Hockey Club
- PGC/Seymour OCA Hockey Club
- Prince Alfred Collegians Hockey Club
- Pulteney Old Scholars Hockey Club
- St Peter's Old Collegians' Hockey Club
- University of South Australia Hockey Club
- Unley High Old Scholars Hockey Club
- Westminster Hockey Club
- Woodville Hockey Club

=== Country leagues ===
- Barossa Valley Hockey Association
  - AM United
  - Gawler Strikers
  - Nuriootpa
  - Tanunda
  - Trinity College
  - Trinity
- Clare & District Hockey Association
  - Donnybrook
  - Springstown
  - Balaklava
  - Burra
  - Wendoree
  - Riverton
  - Sevenhill
- Lower South East Hockey Association
  - Redbacks
  - West
  - Riddoch Strikers
  - Tigers
  - Cavaliers
- Murray Bridge Hockey Association
- Naracoorte Hockey Association
  - Kingston/Luicndale Rangers
  - Dartmoor
  - Redlegs
  - Greenbottles
  - West Wimmera Broglas
- Port Augusta Hockey Association
- Port Lincoln Hockey Association
  - Flinders
  - Marauders
  - Panthers
  - Wanderers
- Port Pirie Hockey Association
  - Park Royal Panthers
  - Risdon
  - Saint Andrews
  - Saint Marks
  - Strykers
  - Wolves
  - Clare
  - Crystal Brook
- Riverland Hockey Association
  - Renmark
  - Berri
  - Loxton
  - Waikerie
- Tatiara Hockey Association
  - Bordertown
  - Willalooka
  - Mundalla
  - Keith
- Whyalla Hockey Association
  - Hummock Hill
  - Steel City
  - Stuart
  - Waratah
- Yorke Peninsula Hockey Association
  - Kadina
  - Moonta
  - Ardrossan
  - Maitland
  - Minlaton

== See also ==
- List of field hockey clubs
- List of sporting clubs in Adelaide
