= Bolton Pride =

Annual LGBT+ event in Bolton, England

- Frequency: Annually
- Locations: Bolton, Greater Manchester
- Country: United Kingdom
- Inaugurated: 16 October 2015
- Most recent: 24–25 May 2025
- Website: pridebolton.co.uk

Bolton Pride is an annual LGBTQ Pride event in Bolton, Greater Manchester, England, first held in 2015. The event includes a parade through the town and live music in the town centre. It is a free event.

== History ==
=== 2015–19: Founding and yealy years ===
Bolton Pride was founded in 2015 by James Edgington and Liz Pycroft, with its first event held the same year. The event's creation was partially a reaction to the release of statistics in early 2015 that showed hate crime against LGBT people in Bolton had increased 135% in the previous year. The aim was to encourage Bolton to become more LGBT friendly; Bolton Pride used the slogan "Love Bolton, hate homophobia". Ian McKellen was guest of honour at the first Bolton Pride, which was held in October.

For Bolton Pride's second event from 23 to 25 September 2016, a parade was introduced. The 'Love Bolton, hate homophobia' theme was continued, and the event included a candle-lit vigil to commemorate victims of hate crime.

Bolton Pride 2017 was held on the weekend of 30 September and 1 October. It featured a candlelit vigil, an LGBT film night, and live music. The parade featured around 500 people with floats.

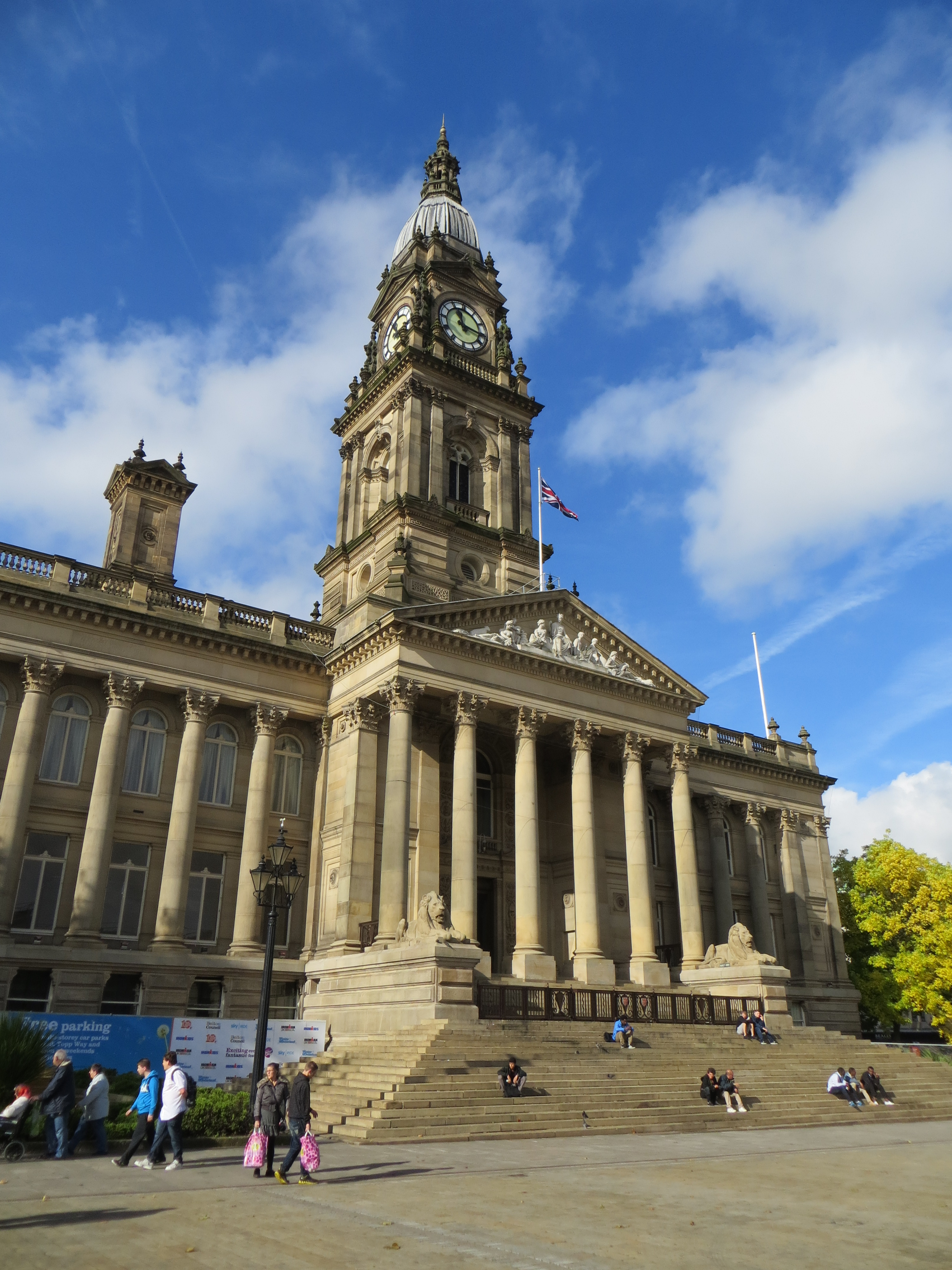
For the 2018 event, Bolton Town Hall was lit in rainbow colours

The 2018 event took place on 21–23 September. It consisted of a vigil, stalls in the market and Victoria Square, and a parade themed around The Greatest Showman and finishing in Victoria Square,

Bolton Pride 2019 was held over three days from 20 September to 22 September. The festival weekend began with a Bolton FM street party in the afternoon, and Bolton Town Hall was lit in the colours of the rainbow flag that evening. On 21 September, there was a parade from Queen's Park to Victoria Square where there was live entertainment in Victoria Square until early evening with evening events at local venues – The Alma Inn and The Venue. The final day, was a Family Fun Day with entertainment and stalls from local charities, community groups and businesses in Victoria Square and the Market Place.

=== 2020–present: COVID-19 pandemic and financial difficulties ===
The event was cancelled in 2020 and 2021 due to the COVID-19 pandemic. It returned in person in August 2022.

In spring of 2022 Edgington, one of the co-founders, stepped down and appointed Kevin Wright as the event's new director. Edington was prosecuted for fraud in connection to the event between 2019 and 2021, his motivation was to keep the event afloat after it went into financial difficulty. In 2022 he was sentenced at Bolton Magistrates, he received a 10 month sentence suspended for 12 months plus 200 hours of unpaid work with 20 rehabilitation activity requirement days. He was also ordered to pay £16,539 in compensation to the local authority.

The event became a slimmed down version by 2024, with the event cut to two days and with restricted hours. Bolton Council had not increased funding to assist the event that year but by 2025 provided £75,000 to Bolton Pride which has met with opposition from various political parties including the Conservative Party, Horwich and Blackrod First and Communities First and their councillors, and Reform UK.

== Awards ==
Each year, Bolton Pride holds the Diversity Awards to recognise work supporting the LGBT community in Bolton.

in 2017, Bolton Pride won the Tell MAMA Award at the #No2H8 Crime Awards for their role in dealing with hate crime.
