= Bolton TIC =

Coordinates: 53°33′18″N 2°25′24″W

Bolton TIC

Bolton Technical Innovation Centre (TIC) is a training centre in Minerva Road, Farnworth, Bolton, Greater Manchester, England. Its purpose is to provide facilities for technical training beyond the capabilities of local schools.

== Aims ==
The Bolton Technical Innovation Centre is intended to assist young people to realise their technical ambitions, by designing and making things beyond what can be achieved in schools. It is designed to inspire young people to become scientists, engineers, and technologists. People from 9 to 19 years of age can visit during and beyond the normal school day, at weekends and during the holidays. The centre is open to all schools in the Bolton area.

== Facilities ==
The centre has a lecture theatre, exhibition space, breakout rooms, and a catering service. It can accommodate up to 200 students. It also has 3D design areas, a research and development hall, video-conferencing, a virtual reality, and visualisation experience, a 3D projection system, rapid prototyping, and advanced manufacturing facilities.

The building was started in 2002–2003, completed in 2005, and officially opened by the Princess Royal in November 2006.
