= Bolton Little Theatre =

Amateur theatre companies in England

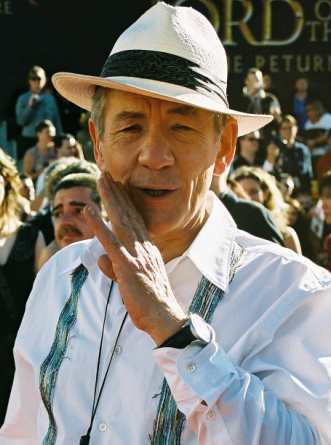
Sir Ian McKellen, Patron

Bolton Little Theatre is a registered charity located at Hanover Street, Bolton BL1 4TG and has a small car park available. It was established in 1931. The theatre is a member of the Bolton Amateur Theatre Societies, The Little Theatre Guild of Great Britain, which it joined in 1947 and the Greater Manchester Drama Federation. Bolton is the envy of many towns as it has the largest amateur theatre network in the UK.

The theatre's Patron is Sir Ian McKellen and this is where this famous British actor started his career shortly after attending Bolton School (Boys' Division).

“Bolton Little Theatre is a very important part of Bolton ...if you wanted to see plays well done you came down to see the amateurs rather than a professional company... the Little Theatre is full of people with real enthusiasm” Sir Ian McKellen, CBE, CofH, September 2006

The theatre's main proscenium arch auditorium seats 165 in traditional rows and the Forge, an intimate theatre in the round has seating for 60. The theatre also has a comfortable bar and exhibition area where one can enjoy a pre-performance drink, or mingle with the cast after the show. The theatre runs theatre workshops and have a youth group for people interested in training in theatre. Members also provide touring productions at outside venues.

== Alumni ==
Past and present famous actors that been associated with Bolton Little Theatre:

- Sir Ian McKellen, CBE, CofH
- Doris Speed
- Bryan Pringle
- Geoffrey Whitehead
- Simon Trinder
- Eric Bentley

Other notable alumni include

- Justin Chadwick, the director of Mandela: Long Walk to Freedom

== Official Website ==
Bolton Little Theatre, http://www.boltonlittletheatre.co.uk
