= Susannah Fish =

Retired senior UK police officer

Chief Constable Susannah Fish OBE QPM
- Occupation: Chief Constable (ret. 2017)
- Known for: Services to policing
- Awards: Queen's Police Medal; Law Enforcement Upstander of the Year; Nottingham Business Awards Woman Achiever of the Year

Susannah Kate Constance Fish OBE QPM is a retired career police officer who was awarded the OBE for services to policing in the 2008 Queen’s Birthday Honours.

== Biography ==
A graduate from London School of Economics joining Nottinghamshre Police in 1986, she received three Chief Constable’s Commendations for professionalism, dedication and courageous leadership. She received the Queen's Police Medal for distinguished service in the 2016 Birthday Honours.

Fish was Deputy Chief Constable of Nottinghamshire Police, being acting Chief Constable from 2016 until 2017, having delayed her scheduled retirement for nine months to cover the absence of Chief Constable Chris Eyre. During her time in the police force she had responsibility for the Force Crime Directorate, Force Intelligence Directorate, Scientific Support, Operational Support, Serious & Organised Crime and is also a Gold Firearms, Public Order and CBRN Commander.

Fish has spoken about the 'toxic culture of sexism' in the police force, and about her own experience of sexual assault by colleagues. She was awarded Law Enforcement Upstander of the Year in the National Hate Crime Awards 2016 for her leadership on misogyny as a hate crime.

Fish has established her own consultancy and has been Nottingham Business Awards Woman Achiever of the Year. She sits on the board of governors of Nottingham Trent University, and was awarded an honorary Doctor of Laws degree by the University of Nottingham in 2018.

Fish was elected as a parish councillor for Wing, Rutland in 2019.

== Honours ==

Ribbon	Description	Notes
	Order of the British Empire (OBE)	2008
	Queen's Police Medal (QPM)	2016
	Queen Elizabeth II Golden Jubilee Medal	
	Queen Elizabeth II Diamond Jubilee Medal	
	Police Long Service and Good Conduct Medal	
