= No2H8 Crime Awards =

National award ceremony in the UK

The No2H8 Crime Awards is a national award ceremony established in 2016 as the National Hate Crime Awards, designed for upstanding individuals who have contributed toward the cohesion of different communities within the UK through the tackling of hatred and prejudice. It is run by a coalition of organisations and was founded by Fiyaz Mughal OBE as a national, annual event. The Chair of the No2H8 Crime Awards is Richard Benson OBE.

The 2017 iteration of the awards scheme was themed as 'Communities Countering Hatred', celebrating and honouring those civil society activists, religious leaders, organisations and politicians who have inspired others and worked against hatred and prejudice in their local communities. The 2017 awards took place on 10 October. The 2018 awards took place on 13 September 2018.

== Partnerships ==
The No2H8 Crime Awards are supported by a number of partners and agencies associated with the protection and empowerment of vulnerable communities. These include Galop, Faith Matters, the Community Security Trust, Tell MAMA, Stop Hate UK, Trans Media Watch, the Anti-Bullying Alliance, Wandsworth and Westminster Mind, and Kick It Out.

The awards have a media partnership with HuffPost and the Jewish News, who attended the 2017 award ceremony. The awards have also partnered with the Daily Mirror and Pride Radio, in addition to being backed by The Birmingham Mail.

The awards have been endorsed by Mayor of London Sadiq Khan, the Mayor of Greater Manchester Andy Burnham and television presenter Saira Khan.

== Judging Panel ==
The winners are determined by a panel of judges, who include:

- Nazir Afzal OBE, former chief executive of the Association of Police and Crime Commissioners.
- Lord Carlile of Berriew CBE QC, Recorder of the Crown Court, Deputy High Court Judge and independent reviewer of terror legislation and [CONTEST|Prevent].
- Rabbi Baroness Neuberger, former chief executive of the King's Fund.

== 2016 National Hate Crime Awards ==
The 2016 National Hate Crime Award winners were announced on 17 November 2016, and the ceremony took place in Central London. The 2016 award winners were as follows:

- Young Upstander Award – Tamanna Miah
- Community Volunteer Upstander Award – Rev'd Canon Mark Oakley
- Upstanding Organisation Award – Communities inc.
- Research and Innovation Award – Dr. Stevie-Jade Hardie
- Media Upstander Award – Awaaz FM Community Radio
- Local Council Service Upstander Award – Northampton Borough Council
- Law Enforcement Upstander Award – CC Susannah Fish, Nottinghamshire Police
- Parliamentarian Upstander Award – David Lammy MP

The Special Award winners for 2016 were:

- Edwin Shukur Award – Mark Healy
- Lawrence Brass Award – Caroline Nelson
- Outstanding Contribution Award – Bruce Brown
- Lifetime Achievement Award – Paul Giannasi
- Tell MAMA Champion Award – Baroness Susan Williams
- The Jo Cox Award – Presented in honour of the late Jo Cox and her vision and values. This was presented to her husband Brendan Cox.

== 2017 No2H8 Crime Awards ==
The 2017 No2H8 Crime Award winners were announced on 10 October 2017. The 2017 award winners were as follows:

- Outstanding Contribution Award – Detective Chief Inspector Shabnam Chaudhri
- The Jo Cox Award – Stop Funding Hate
- Tell MAMA Award – Bolton Pride
- Sheikh Abdullah Award for Intercultural Dialogue – Dr Imam Mamadou Bocoum and Rabbi Jonathon Wittenberg
- Law Enforcer Upstander Award – Northumbria Police Community Engagement Team
- Upstanding Organisation Award – The Sophie Lancaster Foundation
- Tell MAMA Champion Award – Stephen Brookes MBE
- CPS Special Award – Emma Roebuck

== 2018 No2H8 Crime Awards ==
The 2018 No2H8 Crime Award winners were announced on 13 September 2018. The 2018 award winners were as follows:

- Young Upstander Award - Rory McGuire, Ahmad Nawaz and Sienna Castellon
- Law Enforcement Upstander Award - Rukhsana Bashir
- The Jo Cox Award - Luciana Berger MP
- Sheikh Abdullah Intercultural Award - Ravinder Singh and the Yorkshire Dales Millennium Trust
- Lifetime Achievement Award - Michael Ridge

== 2019 No2H8 Crime Awards ==
The 2019 No2H8 Crime Award winners were announced on 7 November 2019. The 2019 award winners were as follows:

- Community Upstander Award - Marteene Pringle
- Parliamentary Upstander Award - Kate Green
- Local Authority Upstander Award - Warrington Borough Council
- Business Upstander Award - Chelsea Football Club
- Social Research Upstander Award - Professor Mark Walters of Sussex University
- Law Enforcement Upstander Award - Inspector Jayne Lewis from the British Transport Police
- Young Upstander Award - Yusuf Patel
- Media Upstander Award - Amelia Gentleman
- Sports Upstander Award - Rotherham United Community Sports Trust
- The Crown Prosecution Service Upstander Award - Gareth Morgan
- Lifetime Upstander Achievement Award - Mark Healey
- The Jo Cox Memorial Award - David Linsey
- Tell MAMA Award - Lord Nick Bourne
