= Bolton Market Hall =

Building in Bolton, Greater Manchester, England

Coordinates: 53.5805°N 2.4297°W

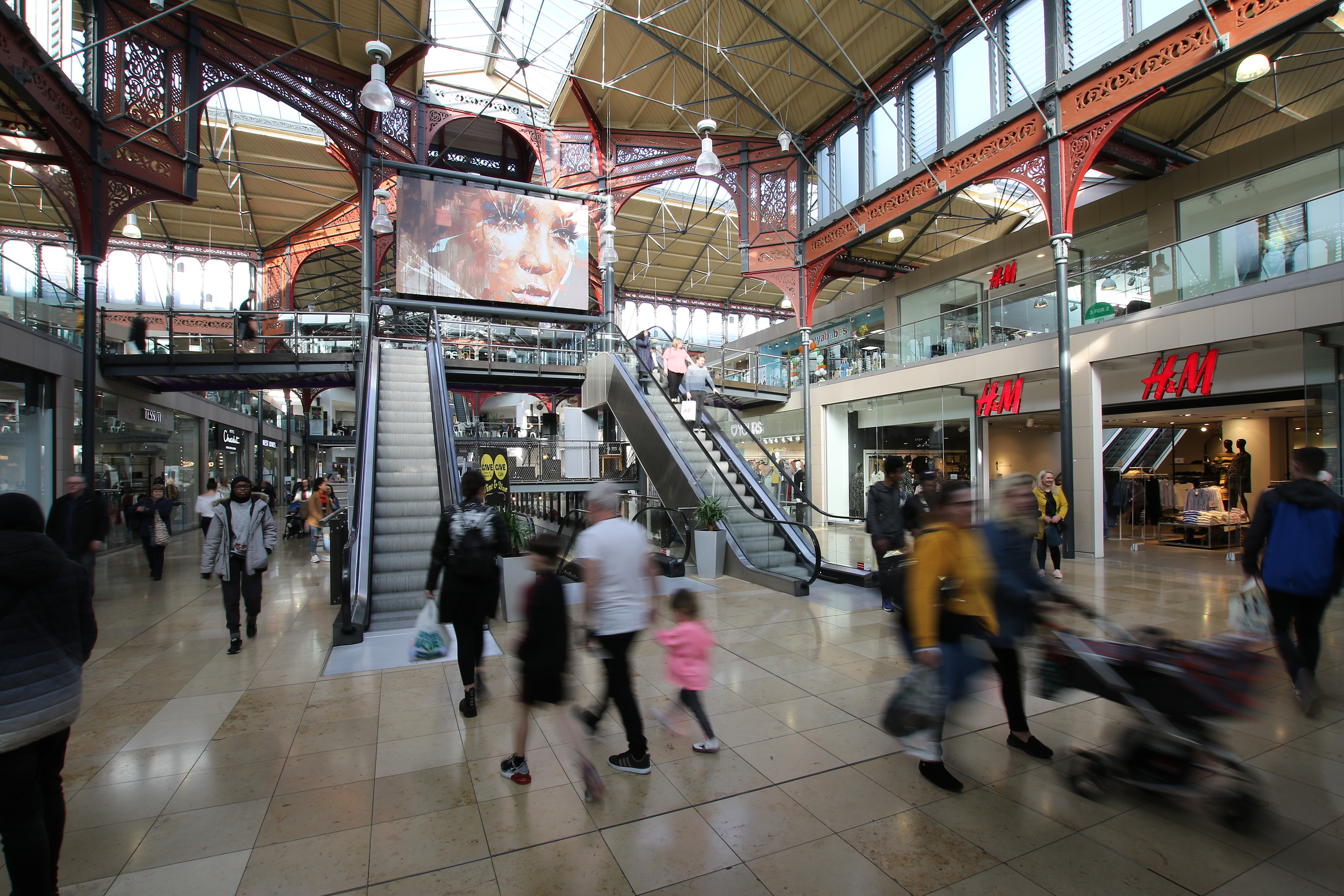
Bolton Market Hall

Bolton Market Hall is a listed building in Bolton, Greater Manchester that is now the Market Place Shopping Centre. The market hall and its integral ground-floor shops on Bridge Street, Corporation Street and Knowsley Street are included in the English Heritage listing.

== History ==
Bolton Market Hall was designed by architect G. T. Robinson, and opened on 19 December 1855. Measuring 294 feet (90 m) in length and covering an area of 7,000 square yards (5,900 m^{2}) it was said to be 'the largest covered market in the kingdom'. It cost £50,000.

A long procession led to the opening ceremony. To complement the produce stalls and boost custom, a fish market was built next to it which opened in 1865 at a cost of £30,000. The fish market was demolished in September 1932.

The market hall was modified in 1894 and further alterations were carried out at the turn of the 20th century. In 1938 the interior layout changed with roofed stalls in tightly packed islands replacing the long rows of stalls and in 1982 a competition brief to redevelop the site immediately to the north of the market hall into a shopping centre was won by Chapman Taylor Partners. In 1985 Grosvenor Developments took over the Market Place project from Wimpey Property Holdings.

The hall was refurbished in the 1980s to become the Market Place Shopping Centre and was opened in 1988 by Queen Elizabeth II.

== Architecture ==
The building has stone façades, a cast iron and glass roof and is a Grade II listed building. Originally a single space with table stalls and blank elevations, it was modified, in the 1890s, 1930s and 1980s. The roof has large expanses of glazing carried on cast iron columns. At its highest point the ceiling is 112 feet (34 m) high and has semi-circular arches. It has a hanging cast-iron lantern and once had a decorative fountain.

In 2007 Warner Estates commissioned van Heyningen and Haward Architects to restore the building's original features and modernise it to 20th century standards. Alterations to the original fabric were minimized and a scheme developed to allow retail units to be slotted into the listed structure, allowing for flexibility and potential removal in the future if desired.

The scheme was contentious involving significant change to a historic building. After consultation and the council awarded planning permission and listed building consent in 2005. English Heritage and the local council's conservation officer were involved in the proposals. The completed Market Place opened in October 2008.
