= Grange Royals Hockey Club =

Australian field hockey club

- Nickname: Sea Eagles
- Founded: 1931
- League: Hockey SA Premier League
- Colours: Maroon & White

Grange Royals Hockey Club is a field hockey club in Adelaide, South Australia.

== History ==
The Grange Men's Hockey Club was formed in 1931 as the result of efforts by Hartleigh Kelly over the summer of 1930–31, to get at least 12 of the Grange district interested in playing hockey. And so a team was fielded in the second division for the 1931 season. The uniform would be a grey shirt with red facings, white shorts and grey socks with red tops (maroon was not a term used in those days). At the end of the minor round, Grange topped the premiership table with 25 points having played 15 games, winning 12, 1 draw, and losing 2, with 64 goals for and 29 against. They played against Blackwood for the flag. This game was drawn, even after another two full halves, and was replayed. The replay, plus extra time, again resulted in a drawn game and the teams were declared joint Premiers. Since then the men have gone on to win 28 Division 1 men's premierships. In the 22 years between 1937 and 1959 the club won 19 men's premierships, a record that is unlikely to be achieved again.

In 1975 (the International Women's Year) the club at the instigation of an enthusiastic group of female players moved to include women's teams as part of the club, and the name was changed to the Grange Hockey Club Inc.

== Merger ==
In 1988 the club membership voted on a motion to absorb the members of Royal Park Hockey Club, and rename the club, Grange Royals Hockey Club Inc (or GRHC). Since the merger the men have won two premierships and the women five, with a very memorable year being the double in 1999.

== See also ==
- List of sporting clubs in Adelaide
- South Australian Hockey Clubs
