= Manchester Baseball Club =

Manchester Baseball Club are a baseball club in the north of England with four senior co-ed teams, the women's team, VI team and a youth programme, playing in the British Baseball Federation leagues. Around the turn of the 21st century, the senior first team was known as the Manchester Express after a sponsorship deal with equipment supplier Baseball Express.
