= Bolton Hockey Club =

- Full name: Bolton Hockey Club
- Nickname(s): Blues
- Founded: 1965
- Ground: Bolton School
- President: TBC
- League: Men's 1s: North Hockey Men's League Division 1, Women's 1s: North Women's Hockey League Division 1
Home colours	Away colours

Bolton Hockey Club is a Men’s, Ladies and Juniors Field Hockey Club Based in Greater Manchester, England.

== About ==
It has over 180 members of which approximately 140 are playing members. This includes players from the 3 Men's Teams, 3 Ladies Teams, 6 Junior Teams ranging from U11 to U18 boys and Girl’s, 1 mix team, a Veterans Team and also some touring sides made up from various members from any team as required.

Bolton Hockey Club was the 2nd Club in Greater Manchester to be awarded the Clubs1st and Clubmark Awards.

== International players ==
One of Bolton Hockey Club's former members, Andy Bull, was on the England national squad for 2009/2010 and Great Britain Team for the Men’s Four Nations Tournament. The team currently has a Junior England International playing for the club.

== Leagues ==
Bolton Hockey Club enters teams in various leagues over the season which include the following:

- North Hockey Men’s League
- Kukri North West Hockey League (Men)
- North Women's Hockey League
- Greater Manchester Hockey Association (Women)
- Bolton Sports Federation Hockey League (Women)

Bolton also enters teams in the following summer leagues

- Bolton Hockey Summer League: Women
- Greater Manchester Summer League: Men's, Women, Mixed
- MHCC Summer League: Men, Women, Mixed

== Ladies Teams ==
Season 2010/2011

Team	Division	League
Ladies 1st XI	Division 1	North Women's Hockey League
Ladies 2nd XI	Division 1	Greater Manchester Hockey Association (Women's)
Ladies 3rd XI	Division 3	Greater Manchester Hockey Association (Women's)
Ladies 4th XI	Section 'B'	Bolton Sports Federation Hockey League

== Men’s Teams ==
Team	Division	League
Men's 1st XI	Division 2	North Hockey Men’s League
Men's 2nd XI	Division 4	Kukri North West Hockey League
Men's 3rd XI	Division 4	Kukri North West Hockey League

== League results ==
Season	Ladies 1st XI	Men's 1st XI
2009–10	4th, Division 1 North Women's Hockey League	10th, Division 1 North Hockey Men’s League
2008–09	11th, Premier Division North Women's Hockey League	11th, Division 1 North Hockey Men’s League
2007–08	8th, Premier Division North Women's Hockey League	8th, Division 1 North Hockey Men’s League
2006–07	1st, Division 1 North Women's Hockey League	1st, Division 2 North Hockey Men’s League
2005–06	4th, Division 1 North Women's Hockey League	2nd, Division 2 North Hockey Men’s League
2004–05	(1st, Feeder League 1 North Women's Hockey League	3rd, Division 2 North Hockey Men’s League
