= Anderton (surname) =

Anderton is a surname. Notable people with the surname include:

- Alain Anderton, British writer
- Bill Anderton (1891–1966), New Zealand politician
- Carl Anderton Jr. (born 1973), American politician
- Charles Anderton (disambiguation), multiple people
- Darren Anderton (born 1972), English footballer
- Elizabeth Anderton (born 1934), British ballet dancer
- Henry Anderton (1630–1667), English painter
- James Anderton (disambiguation), multiple people
- Jim Anderton (1938–2018), New Zealand politician
- Jo Anderton, Australian writer
- John Anderton (disambiguation), multiple people
- Katie Anderton (born 1983), English footballer
- Laurence Anderton (1577–1643), English Jesuit
- Maria Anderton (born 1969), New Zealand footballer
- Michael Anderton (1931–2020), English clergyman and cricketer
- Nick Anderton (born 1996), English footballer
- Paul Anderton (born 1962), Australian bodybuilder
- Phil Anderton, Scottish business executive
- Sophie Anderton (born 1977), English model and reality television personality
- Syl Anderton (1907–1983), British motorcycle dealer and racer
- Sylvan Anderton (born 1934), English footballer
- Thomas Anderton (1611–1671), historical religious figure
- Robert Anderton (died 1586), Catholic martyr
- William Anderton (1879–?), English footballer
