= Charles Anderson =

Charles Anderson may refer to:

== Military ==
- Charles Anderson (VC) (1827–1899), English born Irish recipient of the Victoria Cross
- Charles Alexander Anderson (1857–1940), British Army general
- Charles D. Anderson (1827–1901), American planter, businessman, legislator, and soldier
- Charles DeWitt Anderson (1827–1901), American soldier, railway builder, civil engineer, and lighthouse keeper
- Charles Marley Anderson (1845–1908), U.S. Civil War veteran and politician
- Charles W. Anderson (soldier) (1844–1916), American soldier and Medal of Honor recipient
- C. Alfred "Chief" Anderson (1907–1996), pilot and Tuskegee airman

=== Fiction ===
- The Rock (film)#Cast

== Politics ==
- Charles Anderson (governor) (1814–1895), 27th Governor of Ohio
- Charles Anderson (mayor) (1875–1949), mayor of Murray, Utah, 1920–1923
- Charles Anderson (Canadian politician) (1858–1939), Ontario physician and political figure
- Charles Anderson (Texas politician) (born 1945), Texas state representative and veterinarian
- C. Arthur Anderson (1899–1977), U.S. representative from Missouri
- Charles Earland Anderson (born 1942), former Alberta provincial politician, 1979–1982
- Charles Groves Wright Anderson (1897–1988), South-African born Australian farmer, politician, and recipient of the Victoria Cross
- Charles G. Anderson (1929–2022), Alaska state representative and police officer
- Charles Henry Anderson (1838–1889), British member of parliament for Elginshire and Nairnshire, 1886–1889
- Charles M. Anderson (1918–1961), British civil servant and diplomat
- Charles Wilson Anderson (1918–2009), Australian politician
- Charles W. Anderson Jr. (1907–1960), American lawyer, state legislator and civil rights leader

== Science ==
- Charles Lewis Anderson (1827–1910), American medical doctor and botanist
- Charles Anderson (mineralogist) (1876–1944), Australian mineralogist and palaeontologist
- Charles Alfred Anderson (1902–1990), American geologist
- Charles E. Anderson (1919–1994), first African American to receive a Ph.D. in meteorology

== Sports ==
- Charles Anderson (cricketer) (1881–1943), Irish cricketer
- Charles Anderson (Australian footballer) (fl. 1909–1915), Australian rules footballer
- Charlie Anderson (Australian footballer) (Charles Victor Roddan Anderson, 1903–1985), Australian rules footballer
- Charles Anderson (equestrian) (1914–1993), American 1948 Olympic gold medal winner
- Chic Anderson (1931–1979), American sportscaster and public address announcer born Charles David Anderson

== Other ==
- Charles Anderson (vocalist) (1883–after 1937), American vaudeville entertainer and blues singer
- Charles Anderson (businessman) (1917–2009), president and CEO of SRI International, 1968–1980
- Charles Anderson (Emmerdale), fictional character from the ITV soap opera
- Charles Morris Anderson (born 1957), principal of Charles Anderson Landscape Architecture, Seattle
- Charles B. Anderson (1879–1953), South Australian railways engineer
- Charles P. Anderson (1865–1930), presiding bishop of the American Episcopal Church, bishop of Chicago
- Charles William Anderson (1866–1938), collector of revenue in New York City
- C. Arnold Anderson (1907–1990), American educator and scholar

== See also ==
- Charles A. Anderson (disambiguation)
- Charles Anderton (disambiguation)
- Chuck Anderson (disambiguation)
- Charlie Anderson (born 1981), American football player
- Charlie Anderson (cricketer) (born 2005), Australian cricketer
