= James Anderton (disambiguation) =

James Anderton (1932–2022) was a British police officer.

James Anderton may also refer to:

- Jim Anderton (James Patrick Anderton, 1938–2018), New Zealand politician
- James Anderton (controversialist) (1557–1613), English Catholic
- James Anderton (aristocrat) (1557–1618), pro-Catholic author
- James Anderton, railway brakeman, victim of the Union Pacific Big Boy No. 4005 accident
- Sir James Anderton, 4th Baronet (1678–1710) of the Anderton baronets

== See also ==
- Anderton (disambiguation)
