= Lostock =

Lostock may refer to:

== Places ==
- Lostock, Bolton, a residential district of Bolton in Greater Manchester, England
  - Lostock Hall Gatehouse
  - Lostock railway station
- Lostock, New South Wales, in Dungog Shire, Australia
- Lostock, Trafford, a residential district of Trafford in Greater Manchester, England
  - Lostock High School, previously called Lostock College
- Lostock Dam, a dam on the Paterson River in New South Wales, Australia
- Lostock Hall, a small village to the south of Preston in Lancashire, England
  - Lostock Hall railway station
- River Lostock, a river in Lancashire, England

== People ==
- Doreen Lostock, a fictional character in the British soap opera Coronation Street
