= Charles A. Anderson =

Charles A. Anderson may refer to:

- Charles Alexander Anderson (1857–1940), British Army general
- Charles Arthur Anderson (1899–1977), politician
- Charles Alfred Anderson (1902–1990), American geologist
- Charles Anderson (businessman) (1917–2009), businessman and CEO of SRI International from 1968 to 1980

== See also ==
- Charles Anderson (disambiguation)
