= James Anderton (aristocrat) =

James Anderton of Lostock (1557–1618) was an English Catholic aristocrat and controversialist.

He belonged to the well-known Catholic Anderton family who lived at Lostock Hall, Lostock, in the parish of Bolton le Moors, in Lancashire, and inherited a large estate from his parents, Christopher and Dorothy Anderton. In 1582 he married the recusant Margaret Tyldesley, though the marriage produced no children.

Like his father he became a lawyer, and in 1592 succeeded his father as prothonotary of the Duchy Court at Lancaster. Both his mother and his wife were faithful Catholics, but like his father, he temporized. In 1603 he signed a loyal address from all the gentry of Lancaster welcoming James I on his progress to London.

He was credited with the Catholic works "The Protestant's Apologie" (of particular note for its labyrinthine footnote apparatus), "The Lyturgie of the Masse", "The Reformed Protestant" and "Luther's Life". It has been claimed, most notably by the nineteenth-century Catholic biographer Joseph Gillow, that the real author of these works was his nephew, the Jesuit Laurence Anderton, although this assertion has been proved to be spurious in recent years.

Anderton was responsible for setting up a Catholic press at his brother's home of Birchley Hall, approximately 13 miles (21 km) from Lostock. Around 20 works were published from this clandestine press between 1615 and 1621, although it is thought that the press was established as early as 1613.

Anderton died on 7 September 1613, having been fully reconciled to the Catholic faith. He left £1500 to the maintenance of the Catholic priesthood in England, a sum of money that the Privy Council and Bishop of Chester became interested in capturing. They never did.

He was widely respected by Catholics of his day. His "Apologie" was translated on the continent into Latin in 1615, and the two editions of the work, published in 1604 and 1608, both got responses from Thomas Morton, the King's chaplain and the man responsible for getting John Donne into holy orders.
