= Charles W. Anderson =

Charles W. Anderson may refer to:

- Charles W. Anderson Jr., a lawyer, civil rights leader, and state legislator in Kentucky
- Charles William Anderson, federal official in the United States
- Charles W. Anderson (soldier), soldier during the American Civil War
- Charles Wilson Anderson (1918–2009), Australian politician
