= Anderton family =

The Anderton family was a notable family, which was divided into several branches and lived in various places throughout the historic county of Lancashire, England. After the Reformation they provided a number of prominent Roman Catholics.

Prominent members included:

- James Anderton (1557–1618).
- Laurence Anderton, alias Scroop (1577–1643).
- Venerable Robert Anderton (1560–1586).
- Roger Anderton (died 1640).
- Thomas Anderton (1611–1671).

== See also ==
- Anderton baronets
