= Charles Anderton =

Charles Anderton may refer to:

- Sir Charles Anderton, 2nd Baronet (1657–1691) of the Anderton baronets
- Sir Charles Anderton, 3rd Baronet (1677–1705) of the Anderton baronets
- Charles Anderton (rugby union) (1868–1959), England rugby player

== See also ==
- Charles Anderson (disambiguation)
- Anderton (disambiguation)
