= Richard Broughton =

Richard Broughton may refer to:

- Richard Broughton (priest) (c. 1558–1634), English Catholic priest and antiquarian
- Richard Broughton (MP) (1524–1604), English politician
- Richard Broughton, president of Society for Psychical Research
- Richard Broughton of Colaba, India
