= Lostock Junction Mills =

Cotton spinning mills in Lostock, Bolton, England

Coordinates: 53.573°N 2.491°W

Lostock Junction Mills (also known as Rumworth Mill) were a pair of cotton spinning mills in Lostock, Bolton, England which stood on a narrow stretch of land between Heaton Road and the Middlebrook but have since been demolished.

Mill No 1 was built in 1860 by the brothers Thomas and Joseph Rowland Heaton. In 1884 it was taken over by William Heaton and subsequently enlarged several times between 1886 and 1915. Mill No 2 was built in line next to Mill No 1 in 1900. In 1914 the business was described in Grace's Guide as cotton spinners specializing in the spinning of fine, super-combed sea island yarns, suitable for lace, muslin, harness twine, sewing thread, etc. Employees 1,200.

William Heaton and Sons was formed to operate the two mills and the company's other mill at Delph Hill, Halliwell. By 1950 the company had evolved into Crosses and Heatons Ltd.

In 1971 the Lostock Junction mills were closed. After demolition in 1973 they were replaced with housing based around Middlebrook Drive.

The mill chimney was toppled by Fred Dibnah.

== See also ==
- List of mills in Bolton
