= Ormrod and Hardcastle =

Ormrod and Hardcastle spinning and manufacturing firm began in 1788, with the partnership of James Ormrod and Thomas Hardcastle, and the purchase of the Flash Street mills in Bolton, Greater Manchester. These two men have been identified amongst the fathers of the early cotton trade in North West England. Others named are Carlisles, Gray, Knowles, Bulling, Crook and Culling. These names often figured prominently in the political, judicial and economic life of Bolton during its great period of growth, but sadly these names have been largely forgotten in the history of the cotton trade. By the time of their closure, in 1960, Ormrod and Hardcastle owned six large successful cotton mills in Bolton.

== History ==
=== 18th Century ===
Thomas Hardcastle established a bleaching business in Bradshaw at the young age of nineteen and the start of a cotton spinning firm was to be his next business venture. The partnership with James Ormrod and the purchase of Pin Mill, Royal George Mill, Royal Sovereign Mill and Great Moor Street Mill, in Bolton, made this business plan possible. These mills were more commonly known as the Flash Street Mills (floorspace 198,000 square ft). Pin Mill fronted Ormrod Street, Royal Sovereign Mill faced Flash Street and Royal George Mill fronted Western Street/ Great Moor Street. The new cotton spinning firm was to consist of cotton spinners, doublers and manufacturers. It was the construction of the Manchester, Bolton and Bury Canal in 1791 that started Bolton on its path to becoming a centre for textile production in North West England with an international reputation. In particular, it was important for the Bolton Mill owners as it connected the town to Bury and Manchester and subsequently provided a more direct transport route for coal and other basic materials.

=== 19th Century ===
Bolton flourished in the 19th Century and quickly became Lancashire's third largest engineering centre, after Manchester and Oldham. It was this introduction of Textile manufacture during the Industrial Revolution that forced Bolton's quick development, urbanisation and cotton mill success. However, there is a limited amount of information that has survived about the Bolton cotton mills. This is could be for a number of different reasons. Firstly, records take up a lot of space and as a result they are commonly destroyed or divided up among many sources. Secondly, production work of this nature does not often produce records that people see as important enough to keep. Lastly, records may still exist but they are unknown to local archives. Ormrod and Hardcastle Spinning and Manufacturing firm was very successful during the nineteenth century and was ever expanding despite a few drawbacks along the way. For example, in 1818 the Royal Sovereign Mill burnt down but this was common for cotton mills as floors were wooden and gas lights were used. The main fire hazard was 'fluffy cotton' that at times became almost explosive. One cotton mill worker commented how a six-story mill could burn down in an hour and when a "taper was used to ignite the gas lightening, the 'dain' would ignite and fire would spread along a line of looms." However, in this case it was suspected that the Royal Sovereign was burnt down by an act of arson because of social unrest in that period. In 1825 James Ormrod died (aged 56) and Peter Ormrod (d.1875) became head of the eminent firm along with James Cross (d.1889), a local justice of the peace. This is just a few years before 'the age of the train' began, in 1828, with the opening of the Bolton Leigh Railway, engineered by George Stephenson. This opening was a very significant moment in the history of North-West England as it was Lancashire's first railway that could transport paying public as well as goods. The railway even opened two years before the opening of the highly celebrated railway from Manchester to Liverpool railway. This new train line was a great asset for the cotton mill owners as it connected Bolton to the Leeds and Liverpool Canal and thus provided an important link with the port of Liverpool. This link allowed the import of raw cotton from America or Egypt to travel directly and quickly to the mills. The railway was so successful that it was extended in 1829 to link up with the Manchester to Liverpool Line. It was this environment that encouraged the success of the Ormrod and Hardcastle Mills. In 1838 the Royal George Mill burnt down. Nonetheless, this not to be a setback for the firm and in 1857 they purchased another spinning mill called Bullfield Mill (established as Messrs Twycross when it was built in 1842). This resulted in Ormrod and Hardcastle owning 113,688 spindles and 458 looms. On 5 June 1881 Ormrod and Hardcastle spinning firm suffered another fire and this resulted in £10,000 worth of damage to Bullfield Mill and they were forced to demolish 50% of the building. Following this, in 1884, the firm wisely decided to invest in The Royal George Mill and Pin Mill and improved their fire proof standards. The mills seemed to be going from strength to strength as in 1888 the firm amalgamated with Arthur Briggs's Parrot Street Mill. Bolton's international reputation, as one of the most productive centres of cotton spinning in the world, was becoming so impressive that it generated a lot of attention from leading figures of the day. For example, Prince Albert visited Bolton in 1851.

=== 20th Century ===
In the 1900s Ormrod and Hardcastle became one of fourteen businesses to become part of the Fine Cotton Spinners and Doublers Association Ltd Ltd (FCSDA Ltd). However, the mills continued to trade under the name Ormrod, Hardcastle and Co Ltd until closure. The mills had grown to consist of 364 looms, 115,664 mule and ring spindles and 32,438 doubling spindles. However, in 1902 the Bleaching business became part of the Bleachers Association and in World War I it was used for a number of government contracts. In 1912 Britain's cotton industry sadly reached its peak, with eight billion yards of cloth being produced, but in 1924 the company was evidently still successful as the Royal Sovereign Mill was expanded (spinning looms now reach 99,456 and the number of doubling spindles increased to 40,456). Despite one of the Mills being hit by a bomb, during a Zeppelin raid, on 26 September 1916. Even though Bolton was not the intended target 21 bombs were dropped and 13 civilians were killed (for photos see Bolton Archive). It was only the 1959 Cotton Industry Act that forced the closure of the cotton mills in 1960 as it resulted in the collapse in the demand for cotton. The Flash Street Mills soon became a place for light industries whereas the Parrot Street Mill became a brewery under the control of Magee Marshall and co Ltd before a factory named Cambrian Soft Drinks Ltd.

== See also ==
- Cotton industry
- Cotton-spinning machinery
- History of cotton
- Wyresdale Park
- Industrial Revolution
- Lancashire Cotton
- Lancashire Cotton Corporation
- List of mills in Bolton
- Spinning (textiles)
- Timeline of clothing and textiles technology

== Bibliography ==
- Archer, John (2000). Social Unrest and Popular Protest in England, 1780–1840. Cambridge: Cambridge University Press.
- Crankshaw, W and Blackburn, Alfred. 1947. A century and a half of cotton spinning, 1797–1947: the history of Knowles Limited of Bolton. Bolton: Knowles Limited.
- Farnie, D.A and Williams, Mike (1992).Cotton mills in Greater Manchester. Preston: Carnegie Publishing.
- Kenny Christine (1994). Cotton Everywhere:Recollections of Northern Women Millworkers. Bolton: Aurora.
- Longworth, James (1986). The Cotton Mills of Bolton 1780–1985 A Historical Directory. Bolton: Bolton Museum and Art Gallery.
- Pevsner, Nikolaus (1969). South Lancashire: The Industrial and Commercial South. Yale: Yale University Press.
- Mitchell, W (1984). Life in the Lancashire Mill Towns. Yorkshire: Dalesman Books.
- Waterson, A,(1985).On The Manchester, Bolton and Bury Canal.Lancashire:Neil Richardson.
- Southern, Christine (1975). The Changing Face of Bolton. Lancashire: Hendon Publishing.
- Thomas, R (1980). The Liverpool & Manchester Railway. London: Batsford.
- The Lancashire Textile Industry 1950(1950). Textile Warril Standard Publication.
- The Lancashire Textile Industry 1954 (1954). Textile Warril Standard Publication.
