= Anderton =

Anderton may refer to:

== People ==
- Anderton (surname)
- The Anderton baronets of England

== Places ==
- Anderton, Cheshire
- Anderton, Cornwall
- Anderton, Lancashire

== Other uses ==
- USS Anderton (SP-530), a US Navy minesweeper in commission from 1917 to 1919
