= Richard Broughton (priest) =

English Catholic priest

Richard Broughton, alias Rouse, (ca. 1558 in Great Stukeley, Huntingdonshire – 18 January 1634) was a Catholic priest and antiquarian.

== Life ==
Broughton claimed descent form the Broughtons of Lancashire. He was ordained at Reims on 4 May 1593 and soon after returned to England. John Pitts, a contemporary, says that he "gathered a most abundant harvest of souls into the granary of Christ" and eulogizes his attainments in being "no less familiar with literature than learned in Greek and Hebrew". Broughton became an assistant to the archpriest, a canon of the chapter, and vicar-general to Richard Smith, Bishop of Chalcedon. He also claims recognition for his influence on the study of antiquity; having earned, partly by his work and partly through controversy, the right to honourable mention with Henry Spelman, Edward Reyner, William Dugdale, and other well-known antiquarians. In The ecclesiasticall historie of Great Britaine, Broughton sought to rehabilitate Joseph of Arimathea for the Catholic cause. Since, it was believed, Joseph had arrived in Britain before the Catholic faith had been established, Protestants such as John Bale argued that England had a purer form of faith. Catholic polemicists such as Robert Persons attempted to deal with the Arimathean problem by diminishing its importance, even hinting that the story of Joseph's journey to Glastonbury may have been completely false. Broughton, however, specifically refuted Persons and others who made Joseph’s ‘coming hither doubtfull’, and marshalled evidence that would demonstrate the Catholic nature of Joseph’s faith (images, relics) and prove that Joseph actually had come to Britain. Amongst which was the ‘miraculous testimonie’ given annually by the Christmas-flowering Holy Thorn of Glastonbury; not, at this stage in the legend’s development, described as Joseph’s flowering staff but nonetheless growing ‘in the very place where S. Joseph with two others of his holy company first rested their weary bodies'.

== Works ==
Broughton's chief works are:

- An Apologicall Epistle, serving as preface to a Resolution of Religion, signed R. B. (Antwerp, 1601);
- The first part of the Resolution of Religion By R. B. (Antwerp, 1603), often mistaken for Robert Persons's Resolution (i.e. The first booke of the Christian exercise, appertayning to Resolution);
- A New Manuall of old Christian Catholick Meditations (1617), dedicated to Anne of Denmark;
- The English Protestants Recantation in Matters of Religion... (1618), presumably inspired by James Anderton's massive Protestants Apologie for the Roman Chvrch (1608);
- The Judgment of the Apostles (Douai, 1632), dedicated to Queen Henrietta Maria and directed against Rogers on the Thirty-nine Articles;
- Ecclesiasticall Historie of Great Britaine (Douai, 1633), dedicated to the Duchess of Buckingham and the Countess of Rutland;
- A True Memorial (London, 1650), published by G. S. P(riest) after Broughton's death. The 1654 edition is entitled Monasticon Britannicum.

Broughton also wrote on the antiquity of the world, Sterlingorum (Hearne, II, 318, 381); on the alleged conversion (1621) of John King, Bishop of London; and A Relation of the Martyrdom of Nicholas Garlick.

He died according to Anthony à Wood, 15 Kal. Feb. 1634 (i.e. 18 January 1634).

== Bibliography ==
- Wood, Anthony à, Fasti, ed. Bliss (London, 1815), I, 428
- Dodd, Charles, Church History, ed. Tierney (Brussels, 1742), III, 87
- Pitts, John, De Rebus Anglicis, 815
- Foley, Henry, The Records of the English Province of the Society of Jesus (London, 1880), VI, 181
- Hurter, Hugo von, Nomenclator litterarius theolgiae catholicae (Innsbruck, 1871), I, 657
- Gillow, Joseph, Bibliographical Dictionary of the English Catholics (London, 1885), I, 318
- Grove, Archibald (1886). "Broughton, Richard" . In Stephen, Leslie (ed.). Dictionary of National Biography. Vol. 6. London: Smith, Elder & Co. p. 462.
