= Bolton Wanderers Free School =

Location
- University of Bolton Stadium; Burnden Way; Lostock; Bolton, Greater Manchester, BL6 6JW; England; 53.5807°N 2.5368°W

Information
- Type: Free school sixth form
- Established: June 2014
- Closed: July 2017
- Local authority: Bolton Council
- Gender: Mixed
- Age: 16 to 19

Bolton Wanderers Free School was a free school sixth form located in the Lostock area of Bolton, in the English County of Greater Manchester. The sixth form was established by Bolton Wanderers Football Club through the (not for profit) Eddie Davies Education Trust. The sixth form was located in the University of Bolton Stadium, the club's ground. Emile Heskey visited the school in May 2015.

The school was initially set for 400 students aged 16 to 19, and was to be built alongside the then Reebok Stadium, with completion scheduled for 2016. It offered vocational sixth form courses in sport, health and social care, business, public services and childcare. Courses included BTECs at levels 1, 2 and 3.

It was reported in March 2017 that Bolton Wanderers had charged the “failing free school £600,000 in rent”. The school subsequently closed four months later as a result of low pupil numbers, which led the school’s trustees to deem it “not financially viable”. The school had a deficit of more than £380,000 at the time of its closure.
