= Chuck Anderson =

Chuck Anderson may refer to:

- Chuck Anderson (jazz guitarist) (born 1947), American jazz guitarist
- Chuck Anderson (Canadian football) (1917–1975), Canadian Football League player

== See also ==
- Charles Anderson (disambiguation)
