= List of mills in Bolton =

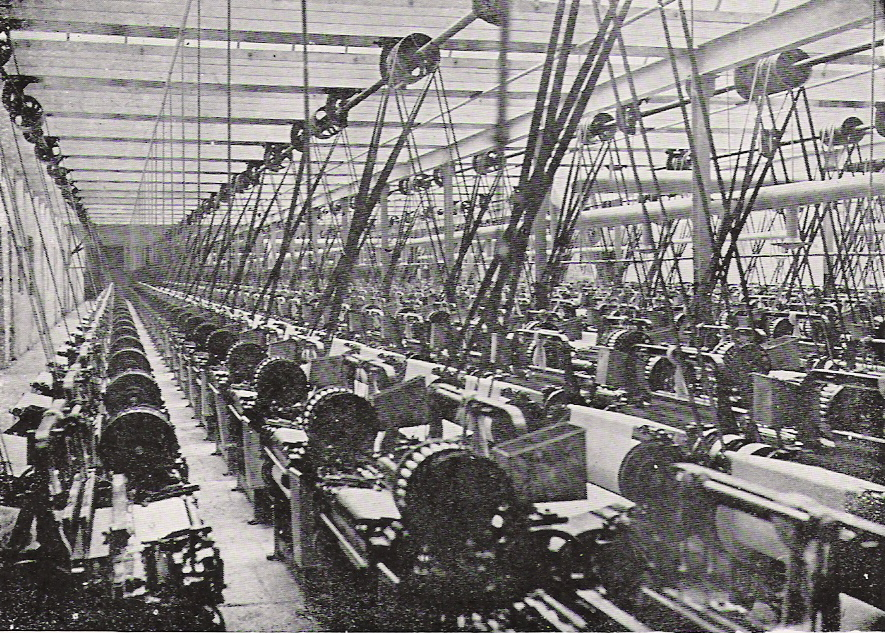
Cotton weaving mill

This list of mills in Bolton lists textile factories which existed at one time or another in the Borough of Bolton, Greater Manchester, England.

From the Industrial Revolution until the 20th century, Bolton was a major centre of textile manufacture, particularly cotton spinning. During this period, Bolton was dominated by large rectangular brick-built factories, many of which still remain today as warehouses or converted for residential or retail use. In 1929 there were 247 cotton mills in the borough and in 2009 a study revealed that 108 had survived in some form. The others had been totally demolished and their sites used for other purposes.

163 mills are listed below according to the Bolton ward in which they stand or once stood. The great majority of the premises listed represent spinning mills, the remainder weaving sheds.

== Astley Bridge ==
Name	Architect	Location	Built	Demolished	Served (Years)
Astley Bridge Mill (Holden Mill)	Bradshaw, Gass and Hope	Hill Cot Rd 53°36′22″N 2°25′50″W	1926	In use	
	Notes: John Holden's Mill. Last cotton mill to be built in England. Grade II listed building 1985– Converted to apartments				
Britannia Mill, Canning St		Canning St		<1891	
	Notes: 1882-Bamber and Foy + Turner and Ramwell; Replaced by North End Mill				
Hesketh's Spinning Mills (New Mills)		Canning St	c.1866	1870s	
	Notes: 1884-John Stones and Co, New Mills, Astley Bridge; 1900-T M Hesketh and Sons Ltd; 1925-T M Hesketh and Sons Ltd; 1950-T M Hesketh and Sons (Crosses and Heatons Ltd); 1970s Asda				
Hillfold Mills		Belmont Rd 53°36′11″N 2°26′05″W	1865	demolished	
	Notes: 1884-Samuel Hollins and Co Ltd; 1900-W A Openshaw; 1923–1924 Mill No 3 built 1925-W A Openshaw Ltd; 1985-Mechanical Services (trailer engineers) Ltd				
Holland St Mill (New Mill)		Holland St	1868	demolished	
	Notes: 1884-John Ashworth; 1900-John Ashworth Ltd c.1960 Closed as cotton mill				
Holly Mills		Holly St	c.1925		
	Notes: 1925-Hill, Davidson and Co Ltd; 1985-Dorma (Hill Davidson Branch) Vantona Group				
New Eagley Mills		Ashworth Lane	1803	<1985	
	Notes: 1803-John and Edmund Ashworth; 1818-Henry Ashworth; 1821–1853 Henry and Edmund Ashworth; 1854-Henry Ashworth and Sons; 1880-closed as spinning mill 1884-H Ashworth and Sons; 1891-Henry Ashworth and Sons, 1200 looms 1949-Weaving shed closed Riding School				
North End Mill (Canning St Mill No 1,2,3,4)		Canning St/All Souls St	1891	<1971	
	Notes: Built on site of Brittania Mill No1 and Spring Mill; 1900-North End Spinning Co Ltd, Blackburn Rd; 1925-North End Spinning Co Ltd, Blackburn Rd and Tippinges Rd (North End Mill No 2); 1950-North End Spinning Co Ltd, Blackburn Rd and Tippinges Rd (North End Mill No 2, Crosses and Heatons Ltd) c.1960 Canning St No 2,3 and 4 Mill closed 1971 Canning St 1 closed 1985 Site re-developed for housing				
Spring Mill		Blackburn Rd			
	Notes: 1871- Bamber and Mallett; Replaced by North End Mill				

== Breightmet ==
Name	Architect	Location	Built	Demolished	Served (Years)
Breightmet Mill		Bury Rd		<2016	
	Notes: 1925-Rusden and Co Ltd; 1950-Universal Sewing Co Ltd; 1950s-Frederick S Shorrock; 1985-Boundary Garage				
Brook Mill		Oakenbottom Rd			
	Notes: 1891-William Hampson and Son, 35,000 spindles c.1959-Paint works				

== Bromley Cross ==
Name	Architect	Location	Built	Demolished	Served (Years)
Bridge Mill		Threadfold Way, Eagley 53°36′49″N 2°25′36″W	late 18th century	in use	
	Notes: Grade II listed building Converted to residential use				
Eagley Mills (No 2 (Valley Mill), No 3 (Brook Mill))	Bradshaw Gass and Hope	Threadfold Way, Eagley 53°36′51″N 2°25′37″W	1887	In use	
	Notes: Grade II listed buildings (Valley Mill and Brook Mill separately); 1796-John Wakefield; 1820-James Chadwick and Brother; 1871-Brook Mill built 1881-Valley Mill built 1886-Brook Mill damaged by fire 1887-Brook Mill rebuilt 1894-Mill No 1 built 1896-James Chadwick and Brother Ltd; 1950-James Chadwick and Brother Ltd + United Thread Mills Ltd (J & P Coats Ltd); 1972-Closed down 2001–03 Converted to flats as Valley Mill (nearest in picture) and Brook Mill; Engine: 800hp single cylinder engine by Hick Hargreaves, 1884				
Egerton Mills (Deakins Mill)		Off Blackburn Rd, Egerton 53°37′35″N 2°26′36″W	c.1826	in use	
	Notes: 1826-Philip Novelli (with designer Johann Georg Bodmer); 1830–1853 Henry and Edmund Ashworth; 1854 Edmund Ashworth and Sons; 1880-Old mill destroyed by fire 1891-62,900 spindles 1925 Deakins Ltd; 1950 Deakins Ltd + Kohorn Bookcloth Ltd				
Wellington Mill		Turton Bottoms			
	Notes: 1871-Booth and Duckworth				

== Crompton ==
Name	Architect	Location	Built	Demolished	Served (Years)
Albert Mills 1,2		No 1 Higher Bridge St, No 2 Slater St/ Princess St	1851		175
	Notes: 1891 together with Egyptian, Prospect, Cobden and Longlands Mills, Walmersley: Barlow and Jones, 210,000 spindles and 1,300 looms				
Alexandra Mill		Wolfenden St	1862	1982	120
	Notes: 1871-Butler and Murton				
Bradshawfield Mill		Dean St/Kay St	c.1900	c.1985	
	Notes: Jabez Johnson, Hodgkinson and Pearson Ltd				
Bridge St Mill, Bridge St		Bridge St	c.1820		
	Notes: 1820s-Messrs Bolling's; 1857-Bolling and Slade (spinners); 1871-Gooden and Fogg; 1884-James Fogg				
Brookfield Mill (Dowling's Mill)		Handel St 53°35′41″N 2°26′41″W		1905	
	Notes: 1891-William Dowling and Co, 18,000 spindles 1905-Burnt down and replaced by Falcon Mill				
Bullock St Mill		former Bullock St, off Folds Rd	c.1884	<1985	
	Notes: 1884-Brown and Fallows (cotton doublers)				
Churchgate Mill		Churchgate	c.1857		
	Notes: 1857-Churchgate Mill Co (weavers); 1871-James Cullen				
Clarendon Mills		School St near Folds Rd		<2008	
	Notes: 1884-Thomas Bolton and Co				
Cobden Mill		Draycott St/Boardman St off Blackburn Rd	c.1884		
	Notes: 1884-Barlow and Jones Ltd; 1891-together with Albert, Prospect, Egyptian and Longlands Mills, Walmersley: Barlow and Jones Ltd, 210,000 spindles 1963-Closed, partly demolished and redeveloped for housing 1966-Closed by Merton Lewis Ltd; 1985-Multiple industrial uses, housing				
Dart Mill		Union Rd	1908	1985	77
Denvale Mills (Union Mills, Tonge Mill)		Union Rd	1876–85	demolished	
	Notes: 1884-Bolton Union Spinning Co Ltd; 1891– Bolton Union Spinning Co Ltd, 145,000 spindles 1925-Denvale Spinning Co Ltd; 1985-Mill No1 Beloit Walmsley Paper Machinery, Mill No 2 Vacant				
Falcon Mill	George Temperley and Son	Handel St 53°35′41″N 2°26′41″W	1907		119
	Notes: Grade II listed Site formerly occupied by Brookfield Mill (burnt down 1905); Falcon Mill Ltd; 1959 Barlow and Jones; 1967 Carrington and Dewhurst (trading as Barlow and Jones); 1985 Vantona Viyella Yarns Ltd				
Folds Mill		Folds Rd 53°35′07″N 2°25′05″W	c.1884	In use	
	Notes: 1884-Arthur Bromiley; 1891-Arthur Bromiley and Co, 700 looms 1925– Arthur Bromiley and Co Ltd; 1938-Printing Works; 1960s–1980s Marston Radiators; 1985 Aquarium Stores				
Halliwell Mills		Bertha St 53°35′38″N 2°26′23″W	1853	Part in use	
	Notes: 1853-Nathaniel Greenhalgh and William Shaw; 1891-Greenhalgh and Shaw, 76,000 spindles 1900-Greenhalgh and Shaw Ltd; 1985-Greenhalgh and Shaw (Courtaulds plc) <2008-Leybourne/ Weymouth St Mill demolished				
Hope Mills (Phoenix St)		Phoenix St, off Folds Rd	c.1836	<1985	
	Notes: 1836-Blair and Burton (cotton spinners Folds Rd); 1843-Blair and Burton, Hope Mills, Foundry St; 1853-Robert Burton and Sons; 1871-Henry Chandler and Co; 1900-H Axon, Son and Co; 1985-Lorry park 2016-Housing				
Manor St Mill		Manor St/Bank St	c.1800	demolished	
	Notes: c.1927 Manor St Factory; 1933-Demolished for Whitehursts Corn Mills <1985-Site cleared for Car Park				
Mill Hill Mills		Mill Hill Street/Kestor St 53°34′52″N 2°25′01″W	c.1820s	In use	
	Notes: 1820s-Sir Robert Peel; 1829-Old Mill Hill Mill burnt down 1836-John Thomasson and Son; 1844-No 1 Mill built by Thomas Thomasson; 1853-No 2 Mill built by John P Thomasson; 1891-Mill Hill Spinning Co, 45,000 spindles 1900-John Thomasson and Son + Mill Hill Spinning Co Ltd; 1925-John Thomasson and Son (Crosses and Winkworth) + Mill Hill Spinning Co Ltd; 1950-Mill Hill Spinning Co Ltd; 1960-Closed as Cotton mill 1985-W J Leigh and Co, paint manufacturers (now part of Sherwin- Williams)				
Milton Mill		Mule St 53°34′51″N 2°25′05″W	c.1884	In use	
	Notes: 1884-Henry Bond and Co; 1900-Henry Bond and Co; 1930s-Disused; 1951-Vantona Textiles Ltd; 1985-Multiple industrial uses 2016-Sherwin-Williams paint works				
Mount Pleasant Mill		Bury St (Bury New Rd)	c.1842	1927	
	Notes: 1842–1849 Smith and Bell; 1857-Barlow Goody and Co; 1870-Mill destroyed by fire 1871-John Rostron; 1884-Bamber and Co Ltd; 1891 together with Waterloo Mill: Bamber and Co, Limited, 50,000 spindles 1900-Mount Pleasant Co Ltd; 1927-Mill demolished Car showrooms				
Nelson Mills 1,2 (Gaskell St Mill)		Gaskell St 53°35′07″N 2°26′23″W	1861	In use	
	Notes: 1861-Mill No 1 built 1871-Mill No 2 built 1884-Lord, Hampson and Lord; 1891-Lord, Hampson and Lord, Limited, 83,000 spindle 1950-Lord Hampson and Lord Ltd (Crosses and Heatons Ltd); 1952-Closed as cotton mill 1953-Hargreaves and Hamilton and Co; 1960s-Mill No 2 demolished 1985-Hargreaves and Hamilton				
New Stone Mill (Holdsworth Mill)		China Lane/Higher Bridge St	1880	demolished	
	Notes: 1790s First spinning mill on site 1820 Stone Mills built c.1836–1853 Abraham Haigh and Son; 1853-Holdsworth Brothers; 1880-Stone Mill demolished, New Stone Mill built 1884-Holdsworth Brothers; 1925-Holdsworth Brothers Ltd; 1990-Demolished; Part of site used for storage of new cars				
Park Mill		Gaskell St	1866–1875	1986	
	Notes: 1884 Park Mill Spinning Co Ltd; 1891 80,000 spindles				
Peakes Place Cotton Works (Burton Factory)		Peak St/Wapping St	1848–1882	In use	
	Notes: 1884-William Tristram; 1891-William Tristram, 35,856 spindles 1900-William Tristram Ltd; 1925-Walter Mather and Co Ltd c.1938 Montagu Burton Ltd; 1978-Closed; 1985-Multiple industrial uses as Halliwell Industrial Estate				

== Farnworth ==
Name	Architect	Location	Built	Demolished	Served (Years)
Albert Mill		Gladstone Rd			
	Notes: 1891-Wallwork and Sussum, 61,440 spindles				
Albion Mills		Cawdor St			
	Notes: 1891-Robert Briercliffe, 48,000 spindles				
Bentinck Mill		Bentinck St			
	Notes: 1891-Bentinck Street Mill Co, Limited, 240 looms				
Bolton Textile Mill No. 2		Cawdor St 53°33′14″N 2°24′29″W	c.1905		
	Notes:				
Bridgewater Mill		Farnworth			
	Notes: 1891-Porritt Brothers, 245 looms				
Cawdor Mill		Cawdor St/Thynne St 53°33′15″N 2°24′18″W	Existed 1884		
	Notes: ?1891-John Phethean and Co Ltd, 340 looms				
Century Mill		George St 53°32′43″N 2°24′40″W		2023	
	Notes: Century Mill had 16,674.00 sq m of floorspace. It was demolished in 2023 to be replaced by housing.				
Cobden Mill		Gower St 53°33′09″N 2°24′26″W	c.1890	in use	
	Notes: Grade II listed 1891-John Harwood and Son				
Denmark Mill		Cawdor St 53°33′15″N 2°24′19″W	c.1891	in use	
	Notes: 1891-Crook Brothers, 30,000 spindles				
Egerton Mill		Cawdor St			
	Notes: 1891– Philip and Thomas Bateman, Limited, 1,000 spindles 1891-John Hindley, 4000 spindles				
Harrowby Mill		Harrowby St 53°32′55″N 2°24′13″W		in use	
	Notes: 1891-William and Joseph Almond, Limited, 27,168 spindles 2019– Multiple use				
Horrockes Mill		Lorne St 53°33′23″N 2°24′29″W	late 19th century	in use	
	Notes: Grade II listed 1891-Horrockses, Crewdson and Co, Limited, 42,782 spindles, 2,581 looms Engine: 2400hp cross compound engine by Yates and Thom, 1914				
Lorne Street Mill No. 1		Lorne St			
Lorne Street Mill No. 2		Lorne St			
Lorne Street Mill No. 3		Lorne St			
Victoria mill		Piggott St/Albert Rd			
	Notes: 1891-Eli Dyson, cotton spinners				

== Great Lever ==
Name	Architect	Location	Built	Demolished	Served (Years)
Albion Mill 1,2,3,4		St Marks St 53°34′12″N 2°25′36″W	1850–1870	In use	
	Notes: 1850–1870 James Marsden and Sons; 1884-James Marsden and Sons Ltd; 1891 182,000 spindles 1950s and 1960s-Courtaulds				
Asia Mill (Carter St Mill)		Bradford Rd 53°33′47″N 2°25′08″W	1895	In use	
	Notes: 1900-Wolfenden and Son Ltd; 1985-Wolfenden and Son Ltd (Courtaulds Northern Division); Multiple users				
Beehive Mill		Crescent Rd 53°33′45″N 2°24′56″W	1895	2019	124
	Notes: Grade II listed 1895-Mill No 1 built 1900-Beehive Spinning Co Ltd; 1902 Mill No 2 built 1967 Closed as cotton mill 2019 Demolished for housing Engine: 2000hp triple expansion four cylinder engine by Hick Hargreaves, installed 1906				
Bradford Mill		Weston St/McKean St	1868	1970s	
	Notes: 1891-Winder and McKean, 45,000 spindles				
Calcutta Mill		Salop St off Shifnall St			
Carlisle's Cotton Mill (Bradshawgate Mill)		Gt Moor St/Bradshawgate	C.1820	1973	
Cunliffe St Mill		Cunliffe St/Bradshawgate	c.1857	<1930	
	Notes: 1857-Cunliffe and Bromilow				
Deane Road Mill (Crooks Mill, Holts Mill)		Harris St/Deane Rd 53°34′22″N 2°26′18″W	1835	2014	179
	Notes: 1836–1853 Joshua Crook and Sons; 1857-J J & H Crook; 1884 Joshua Crook and Sons; 1960s-Holt Hosiery Co Ltd; 2014-Demolished				
Derby Mill		Swan Lane/High St	1866		160
	Notes: 1884-William Young; 1925-Youngs Ltd; 1985-Robert Watson and Co Ltd				
Derby St Mill Hosiery Works		Thomas St/Derby St 53°34′10″N 2°26′28″W	c.1836	In use	
	Notes: 1836–1843 Heaton and Brimelow; 1857-T M Heaton; Charles and Alfred J. Heaton; 1884-Derby St Cotton Spinning Co Ltd; 1900-Derby St Cotton Spinning Co Ltd T Wilkinson proprietor 1950-Holt Hosiery Co Ltd; 1985-K B Textiles and other textile users				
Derby St Mills		Emblem St/Cannon St	c.1857	<2008	
	Notes: 1857-John Kershaw; 1884-John Kershaw and Co; 1891-John Kershaw and Co, 1,200 looms 1900-John Kershaw and Co (John Haslam and Co Ltd proprietor); 1985-William Wadsworth Ltd				
Dove Mill	Stott & Son	Deane Church Lane 53°33′53″N 2°27′39″W	1905	In use	
	Notes: Dove Spinning Co Ltd; 2011-Online shopping outlet				
Eagle Mill		Rasbottom St 53°34′19″N 2°26′18″W	1884	In use	
	Notes: 1884-Joseph Crook & Co; 1891 50,000 spindles 1925-Bolton Eagle Spinning Co Ltd; 1951-Bolton Spinning Co Ltd + Botany Spinning Co Ltd; 1960s-Bolton Spinning Co Ltd; 1985-Bulmer and Lumb Ltd; 1990-The University of Bolton – Eagle Tower				
Flash Mill		Crook St/Derby St	c.1857		
	Notes: 1857-Bolling and Slade; 1884-Thomas Brown; 1900-School; 1985-Bolton Metropolitan College; 2008-Student Union Offices				
Flash St Mills (Pin, Royal George, Royal Sovereign, Great Moor St Mills)		Great Moor St/Ormrod St		1990s	
	Notes: 1788-Established as Ormrod and Hardcastle; 1818-Royal Sovereign burned down 1825-James Ormrod died 1838-Royal George burned down 1857 – 1865 George and Pin Mills built to fireproof standards 1924-Sovereign Mill extended 1925 Ormrod and Hardcastle Co Ltd + Woodeaves Co Ltd; 1960s Closed as Cotton Mill; 1990s Demolished Now Mecca Bingo and Casino; Engine: 1000hp Vertical triple expansion engine by Victor Coates of Belfast installed 1900. Mill converted to electric drive in late 1950s.				
Fletcher St Mill		Fletcher St	c.1836	In use	
	Notes: 1836–1853 William Martin and Son; 1857-Peter Martin; 1884-Dacca Twist Co; 1891 together with Mather St Mill: Dacca Twist Co; 1900-Dacca Twist Co, proprietors Rylands and Sons Ltd; 1925-Hollas Ltd; 2016-G.F.Pennington (office furniture)				
Foundry St Weaving Shed		Foundry St/Sidney St/Lever St	c.1857		
	Notes: 1857 William Hardman and John Hampson				
Garfield Mill		Cannon St	c.1900	<2008	
	Notes: 1900-James Kippax and Son; 1925-James Kippax and Son Ltd; 1950-Vantona Textiles Ltd c1960s Closed as textile mill 1964-Multiple industrial uses, later demolished				
German St Mill (Haslam Mill)		Haslam St	1850		176
	Notes: 1888-German St Mill Co Ltd, Purchased by John Haslam and Co Ltd; 1891-German St Mill Co Ltd, 730 looms 1914-Street name changed to Haslam St and mill named changed to Haslam Mill; 1925-Haslam Weaving Co Ltd c.1957-Closed as textile mill 1985-British Aerospace PLC; 2008-Partly demolished				
Gibraltar Mill		Gibraltar St/Gilnow Lane	1872		154
	Notes: 1884-Jonathan Dearden and Co; 1925-Jonathan Dearden and Co Ltd; 1950 Vantona Textiles Ltd c.1960 Closed as textile mill				
Glebe St Mill		Glebe St			
Globe Hosiery Works		Lower Bridgeman St 53°34′30″N 2°25′25″W	1929	In use	
	Notes: 1896-Hodgkinson and Gillibrand; 1929-Globe Hosiery Works re-built 1972-Hodgkinson and Gillibrand Ltd moved to Fletcher St; 1985-Multiple industrial uses				
Great Lever Mill (Hartford Tannery)		Weston St 53°33′54″N 2°25′21″W	1874	In use	
	Notes: 1884-Charles Heaton established 1836; 1900-Charles Heaton and Sons Ltd; 1940-Hartford Tannery (William Walker & Sons); 1985-Multiple industries Engine:800hp right hand tandem compound engine, named "Elizabeth", by John Musgrave & Sons of Bolton				
Great Lever Spinning Mill (Grecian New Mill)		Settle St	1874	1971	97
	Notes: 1884-Thomas Taylor and Sons Ltd; 1890-Mill extended 1891 together with Grecian Mills: Thomas Taylor and Sons Ltd, 226,000 spindles 1900-Great Lever Spinning Co Ltd; 1925-Great Lever Spinning Co Ltd; 1965-Closed as cotton mill by Courtaulds Ltd; 1971-Demolished for housing 1500hp vertical crosscompound engine by Yates and Thom, 1905				
Grecian Mills		Lever St 53°34′01″N 2°25′45″W	1845		181
	Notes: Grade II listed 1845-First Mill built by Thomas Taylor; 1869-Mill extended 1884-Thomas Taylor and Sons Ltd; 1891 together with Grecian New Mill: Thomas Taylor and Sons Ltd, 226,000 spindles 1925-Mill extended again c.1960-Closed as cotton mill Multiple users 2015-Cannabis Farm				
Hartford Mill		Weston St/Nelson St	1870	1984	114
	Notes: 1870-John and William Knowles/ Williams Knowles and Co; 1884-William Knowles and Son; 1898-John & William Ward later J & W Ward; 1920-Ward and Walker Ltd; 1921-Ward and Walker Ltd (Crosses and Winkworth Consolidated Mills Ltd); 1930-Disused				
High St Mill		High St	1849	demolished	
	Notes: Gregson and Leeming; 1857: T. and L.Gregson				
Hilton Mills		Bridgeman St/Sidney St	c.1884	demolished	
	Notes: 1884-George Hodgkinson and Sons; 1891 875 looms				
Lever St Mill		Lever St/Snipe St	c.1836		
	Notes: c.1836-James Arrowsmith and Son; 1857-James and Thomas Arrowsmith, Spinners and Weavers; 1862-Mill burned down, incorporated into Robin Hood Mill				
Moor Mills (Rothwell Mill)		Parrot St/Rothwell St 53°34′13″N 2°26′10″W	1850–1860	In use	
	Notes: 1857-Johnson Fildes; 1884-Jabez Johnson and Son, Allsop and Co; 1891 6000 spindles, 650 looms 1900-Jabez Johnson, Hodgkinson and Pearson Ltd; 1950-Vantona Textiles Ltd; 1964-Closed as Cotton Mill; 1985-Vantona Textiles Ltd (Warehousing and distribution + F H Lee paper converter Ltd)				
Nelson St Mills (Stott Hillock Mill)		Nelson St	<1882		
	Notes: 1882-Shown on map of Bolton; 1884-Crewdon Crosses and Co Ltd; 1985-Mostly demolished Site part of Edbro complex, surviving mill building used for pet food manufacture				
Ocean Mill		Settle St	1905	1980s	
	Notes: 1925 Ocean Cotton Spinning Co Ltd; 1960 Closed; 1961 Bromilow Edwards Ltd and Ryders Ltd; Engine: 1400hp cross compound engine by George Saxon of Openshaw, 1905				
Orlando Mills		Orlando St			
	Notes: 1880 John and William Lord bankrupt				
Pike Mill		Roxalina St			
Robin Hood Mills		Lever St 53°34′05″N 2°25′38″W	1848	In use	
	Notes: 1836-Old Robin Hood Mill, James Arrowsmith and Son; 1848-Mill No 1 built 1862-Old Mill (Lever St) destroyed by fire 1881-No 1 Mill destroyed by fire (Messrs Peter Cook and Sons); 1882-Old Mill (Lever St) became Mill No 2; 1891-80,000 spindles 1950-Mill No1 Woodeaves Co Ltd + Bowater's Paper Bags; 1974-Woodeaves (Courtaulds Group) closed 1985-Mill No 1 Bolton Plastic Components Ltd and Mill No 2 Sundour Fabrics Ltd -Burgess and Ledward Fabrics				
Rose Hill Mill		Lever St			
	Notes: 1871-Crosses and Winkworth; 1891 (together with Gilnow and The Pike Mills): Crosses and Winkworth, Limited, 325,430 spindles 1891-Henry Hollins and Co, 10,000 spindles Engine: 1250hp tandem engine by Hick Hargreaves, 1877				
Saville Mill	1890	Shifnall St 53°34′34″N 2°25′17″W		derelict	
	Notes:				
St Paul's Mill		Barbara St 53°33′53″N 2°26′38″W		In use	
	Notes: Multiple use				
Swan Lane Mills	Stott & Sons	Swan Lane 53°33′51″N 2°26′32″W	1903	In use	
	Notes: Grade II* listed (Mills 1,2 and Mill 3 separately); 1903-No 1 Mill built, Swan Lane Spinning Company Ltd; 1906-No 2 Mill built 1914-No 3 Mill built 1963-No 3 Mill closed 1985-Swan Lane Spinning Co Ltd – (Courtaulds PLC); No 3 Mill used by multiple industries. Engine (Mills 1,2): Two cross compound engines by George Saxon & Co of Openshaw, 1903 and 1906; Engine: (Mill 3):2000hp triple expansion vertical engine by George Saxon of Openshaw, 1915				
Victoria Mill (part Albion Works)		Bridgeman St/Fletcher St	c.1843		
	Notes: 1843–1853 John Hargreaves and Brothers; 1857-J G and C Hargreaves 1893-Shown as Victoria Mill on 1893 map 1930s Shown as Bridgeman St Goods Warehouse on 1930s map Most of Mill demolished and redeveloped Now known as Albion Works				
Wellington New Mills		Weston St	1884	1984	100
	Notes: 1884-Ainsworth Brothers and Co Ltd (Mill No 1), W and C Ainsworth (Mill No 2)				
Woodside Mill		Division St	1857	1984	127
	Notes: 1871-Harwood and Walmsley; 1891-John Harwood and Son; 1925-John Harwood and Son Ltd. 1958 Closed as cotton mill 1950s-Farnworth Engineering C Ltd; 1984 Demolished and site cleared				

== Halliwell ==
Name	Architect	Location	Built	Demolished	Served (Years)
Atlas Mills Nos 1,2,3,4,5,6,7,8		Mornington Rd 53°35′13″N 2°27′14″W	1864		162
	Notes: 1864-No 1 mill built 1867-No 2 Mill built 1870-No 3 Mill built 1880-No 4 mill (Marsh Fold) built 1865-No 5 Mill built 1887-No 6 (Bentinck St) and No 7 Mill built 1866-No 8 Mill (Shipton Mill) built 1891-John Musgrave & Sons, 360,000 spindles Engine:2500hp twin tandem engine by John Musgrave & Sons installed 1888				
Bridge St Mill, Bark St		Bark St			
	Notes: 1884-John Kippax; 1891 John Kippax, 63 looms				
Bayley Mill (Persian Mill)		Bayley St/Gaskell St	c.1853	1986	
	Notes: 1891-John Bayley and Sons Ltd, 99,000 spindles				
Black Horse Mill		Barn St/Blackhorse St			
	Notes: 1871-Thomas Satterthwaite and Co				
Bolton Union Mills (Union, Vernon, Hebden Mills)		Vernon St/Arrow St 53°35′00″N 2°26′15″W	1875		151
	Notes: 1875-No 1 Mill built 1880-No 2 Mill built 1884 John Hebden and Son, Vernon Mills; 1891-John Hebden and Son, 62,496 spindles 1900 Bolton Union Spinning Company Co Ltd; 1902–1905 Mill No 3 built 19?? Stopped production 1946-Lancashire Cotton Corporation Ltd re-opened mill 1960-Lancashire Cotton Corporation Ltd closed mill 1961-Mills bought by Barlow & Jones and Mill No 1 demolished 1976-Closed by Tootals Ltd; 1985 Mill No 1 site landscaped 1985-No 2 Mill used by Dewhurst Dent Holdings Ltd, G & R Dewhurst (CMT) Curtains Ltd, Dewhurst Printing Company				
Bow St Mill (Cullen's mill, Old Stone Mill/factory)		Bow St/Crown St	1821	1935	114
	Notes: 1871-Thomas Orrell; 1891-James Hilton, 14,000 spindles				
Brownlow Fold Mills 1,2,3		Brownlow Fold 53°35′20″N 2°26′24″W	1860	in use	
	Notes: 1860-Mill No 1 built 1884-Richard Harwood and Son; 1891-Richard Harwood and Son, 80,000 spindles 1905-Mill No 2 built 1907-Mill No 3 built 1961-Mill No1 demolished 1963-Mill No 3 closed				
Bullfield Mill		Cromwell St/New Holder St	c.1842	<1985	
	Notes: c.1842-Messrs Twycross; 1857-Ormrod and Hardcastle (spinners); 1891-Brown and Fallows, 30,000 spindles 1900-Brown and Fallows (spinners and doublers); 1985-Local Authority Housing				
Clyde Mill (Beddows Mill)		Stewart St 53°35′26″N 2°26′10″W	1848	in use	
	Notes: 1871-Slater and Beddows; 1891-Walker and Brown, 27,500 spindles 1925 Lord, Hampson and Lord Ltd; 1950s Edward Law Ltd and Walker Clarkson Ltd; 1985 F & H Footwear Ltd				
Columbia Mills		Kirkhall Lane/Russell St 53°34′58″N 2°26′41″W	1860–70	in use	
	Notes: 1884-Wolfenden and Son; 1891-Wolfenden and Son, Ltd, 53,000 spindles 1950-Ormrod, Hardcastle and Co Ltd; Engine: J and E Wood. 700hp. Installed 1906.				
Coronation Mill		Coronation St/Asburner St	1821	C.1865	
	Notes: 1857-Bolling and Slade; 1860s Messrs Bollings				
Croft Mills		Tennyson St, Brownlow Fold		1980s	
	Notes: 1891-Charles Taylor and Brothers, Ltd., 44,500 spindles				
Egyptian Mills 1,2		Slater St/Higher Bridge St 53°35′11″N 2°25′52″W	1851	in use	
	Notes: 1871-Thomas Wood Heaton; 1884-John Knowles and Son; 1891 together with Albert, Prospect, Cobden and Longlands Mills, Walmersley: Barlow and Jones, 210,000 spindles and 1,300 looms 1891 together with Mossfield Mill: John Knowles and Sons, Ltd, 85,592 spindles 1950-Barlow and Jones; Alligator Self Storage				
Gilnow Mill		Spa Rd 53°34′34″N 2°26′53″W	1847	In use	
	Notes: Grade II listed building 1843 – 1868 P R Arrowsmith & Co; 1868-Destroyed by fire 1871-Salmon and Taylor; 1871-Destroyed by fire 1884-Crosses and Winkworth Ltd; 1891 together with Rose Hill and The Pike Mills: Crosses and Winkworth, Limited, 325,430 spindles 1960-Closed as Cotton Mill; 1985-Multiple industrial use				
Globe Mills		Garside St/Spa Rd	c.1836		
	Notes: 1836-Thomas Taylor and Sons c.1843–1849 Samuel and Thomas Taylor; 1853-James Hodgkinson and Co; 1891-Hodgkinson (Samuel) and Gillibrand (Norman), 12,000 spindles (Kay & Son); 1896-burned down, company moved to Bridgeman Place (Globe Hosiery Works); 1985-Motor vehicle sales and service, light industry				
Great Bridge Mill		Chorley St, White Lion Brow	c.1836	1960–85	
	Notes: 1836-Taylor and Marsh; 1853-David Skinner; 1960–1985 Demolished				
Halliwell Cotton Works (Nortex Mill)		Chorley Old Rd 53°35′03″N 2°26′50″W	1859	In use	
	Notes: c1836-Taylor, Hindle and Co; 1849-Messrs Cannon and Haslam; 1850s-No 2 and No 3 Mills built 1867-No 2 Mill burned down 1891-John Haslam and Co, Limited, 103,248 spindles 1904-Haslam Spinning Co Ltd c.1960-closed c.1964-Joseph Maude and Co Ltd (No 1 Mill); 1971-No 3 Mill demolished 1985-No1 Mill Beaver Ltd + Northern Quilting; 2016-Multiple use				
Knott's Mill (Kershaw's Mill)		Ashburner St/Blackhorse St	c.1821	<1937	
	Notes: 1821–1822 Daniel Knott and Co (spinners); 1857-Bolling and Slade (spinners); 1937-Site of Odeon Cinema; 1985-Top Rank Bingo				
Little Bridge Mill		Chorley St/Dawson Lane	c.1853		
	Notes: c.1853-Oliver Dearden Cotton Waste; 1884 Jonathan Dearden and Co; 1980s-Site redeveloped for industrial units				
Lower Bridgeman St Mill		Lower Bridgeman St		1969	
	Notes: 1900-Swan and Haslam, Reelers; 1950– Swan and Haslam Ltd, Reelers; 1961-Mill closed (Combined English Mills Ltd); 1969– Mill destroyed by fire				
Moorlands Mill (Waterloo Mill)		Nebraska St	c.1843	In use	
	Notes: 1843-James Tomlinson and Co, Cotton Spinners, Waterloo Mill; 1853–Thomas Cross and Co, Waterloo Mill; 1872-Mill burned down 1884-Bamber and Co Ltd; 1891 together with Mount Pleasant Mill: Bamber and Co, Limited, 50,000 spindles 1900-Moorlands Spinning Co Ltd; 1925-Peter Crook Ltd; 1985-Car Sales / Service				
Mossfield Mill		Vernon St	1862	1993	131
	Notes: 1884-John Knowles and Son; 1891 together with Egyptian Mills: John Knowles and Sons, Ltd, 85,592 spindles 1900-John Knowles and Son Ltd; 1925-Knowles Ltd; 1960-Closed as mill 1961-Multiple users 1993 Demolished and developed as housing				
North Bridge Mill		White Lion Brow	1782	1950s	
	Notes: 1857-Lawrence Whittaker, spinner 1882-Shown as machine works on map of Bolton; 1895 Ritherdon & Co Ltd, Electro platers and enamellers. 1950s Demolished; 1985-Garage on site				
Peel Mills 1,2,3,4		Turton St/Waterloo St 53°35′08″N 2°25′17″W	1797–1802		
	Notes: Faulkner, Dillon and Hart / Thomas Dixon / Roger Holland; 1801-Dixon, Greenhalgh and Co; 1820-Robert Knowles; 1830-Robert Knowles and Sons (Round Hill Mills – Four Factories); 1844 Peel Mill No 1 built (aka Turton St New Mill) Robert Knowles and Sons; 1852-Robert Knowles (Round Hill Mills), John and George Knowles(Peel Mill No 1); 1855-Peel Mill No 2 built 1861-William Knowles (Round Hill Mills) <1871>-George Knowles and Son; 1872-Peel Mill No1 burnt down 1875-Peel Mill No 1 rebuilt 1876–1879 Peel Mill No 3 built (The Glass Factory); 1884-George Knowles and Sons Ltd (Peel Mills), William Knowles and Son (Round Hill Mills); 1891-George Knowles and Sons Ltd, 133,764 spindles 1900–1920 Ward and Walker (Crosses and Winkworth Consolidated Mills Ltd); 1925-Knowles Ltd; 1959-Closed as Cotton Mills; 1960-Mills 2 and 3 demolished				
Phoenix Mill		Dean St			
	Notes: 1891-together with Bradshaw Field and Victoria Mill: Thomas Pearson and Son, 3000 spindles				
Prospect Mills		Prospect St 53°35′25″N 2°25′53″W	1864		162
	Notes: 1864-Mill No 1 built 1877-Mill No 2 built 1884-Barlow and Jones Ltd; 1890-Mill No 3 built 1891 together with Albert, Cobden and Egyptian Mills and Longlands Mill, Walmersley: Barlow and Jones, 210,000 spindles and 1,300 looms 1967-Carrington and Dewhurst (trading as Barlow and Jones); 1968-Mills No 1 and No 3 demolished 1970s No 2 Mill Barlow and Jones, Prospect Mill (Carrington Viyella Yarns Ltd); No 2 Mill demolished 4 storey building once connected to Mill No 2 survives				
Spa Mill		Spa Rd 53°34′42″N 2°26′11″W	1801		225
	Notes: 1801-Jeremiah and Joshua Crook; 1809-Crook and Haselden (Crook withdrew 1833); 1836–1843 Executors of John Haselden; 1844 James Haselden; 1849 Cannon and Haslam; 1871-Henry M. Richardson; 1930s-Soap Works; 1985–2007 Multiple users				
St Helena Mills		St Helena Rd 53°34′48″N 2°26′03″W	1777–1780	In use	
	Notes: First mill in Bolton; Grade II listed building 1777-Site leased by Joseph Blundell; 1780 Mill completed James Thweat; 1833-John Dean & John Roscoe; 1833-Bought by Roger Walker; 1843-Robert Walker and Co; 1891-Robert Walker, 3000 spindles 1897-Mill extended 1906-Mill extended again 1941-Mill closed 1946-Mill re-opened by Robert Walker Ltd, cotton waste spinner 1979-Mill closed again 1985-Multiple industrial uses 2016-Bolton Probation Office				
Temple Mill		Dawes St	1836	1882	46
	Notes: 1836-Rowland Hall, Heaton; 1842-Lee, Birch & Co; 1857-L Birch and A Leibert; 1877-Converted to theatre named The Colossal Temple and later Bolton Temple Opera House; 1882-Burned down 1985-Car Park				
Whowells Mill (Hopping Mill, Salt Pie Mill)		White Lion Brow	c.1836	1950s	
	Notes: 1836-John Parker spinner 1843–1853 Alexander Whowell, cotton spinner 1950s-Mill demolished				
Willow Mill		Hanover St/Spa Rd			
Wordsworth Mill (Blue Works)		Wordsworth St 53°35′27″N 2°26′45″W		in use	
	Notes:				

== Heaton and Lostock ==
Name	Architect	Location	Built	Demolished	Served (Years)
Beehive Mill		Alexandra Rd, Lostock 53°34′55″N 2°31′23″W	c.1900		
	Notes: 1900-Crompton Ainscow and Co; 1925-John Ainscow and Co Ltd; 1985-Greenhalgh Bakery				
Lostock Junction Mills		Heaton Rd, Lostock 53°34′20″N 2°29′35″W	1860	1973	113
	Notes: 1891 together with Delph Hill Mill: Thomas and Joseph Heaton – William Heaton, 80,000 spindles				

== Horwich and Blackrod ==
Name	Architect	Location	Built	Demolished	Served (Years)
Victoria Mill		Chorley New Rd 53°35′20″N 2°32′11″W	1904	2007	103
	Notes: W.T.Taylor & Co, 1,200 looms 1970-Stott and Smith (Spirella Group)				

== Kearsley ==
Name	Architect	Location	Built	Demolished	Served (Years)
Arthur Mills		Kearsley			
	Notes: 1891-Kingsley Brothers, 200 looms				
Bent Mills		Bent St, Kearsley			
	Notes: 1891-Kenyon and Co, 170 looms				
Irwell Bank Mills		Church Road, Prestolee		1977	
	Notes: Demolished in 1977. Site used for housing.				
Kearsley Mill		Crompton St, Prestolee 53°32′51″N 2°22′35″W	1904–1908	In use	
	Notes: Grade II listed building 1908-Kearsley Spinning Co; Richard Haworth Ltd (Ruia Group)				
Moss Rose Mill		Stoneclough			
	Notes: 1891-Giles Gee and Sons, 13,000 spindles				

== Little Lever and Darcy Lever ==
Name	Architect	Location	Built	Demolished	Served (Years)
Farmers Arms Mill		Radcliffe Road, Darcy Lever	c.1884	demolished	
	Notes: 1884-Thomas Seddon; 1891-Thomas Seddon, 305 looms				
Hacken Mills		Hacken Lane, Darcy Lever			
	Notes: 1850s-James Wardle; 1884-Wardle and Brown; 1891– J.A. Brown & Co, 500 looms				
Lever Bridge Mills (Dam Side Mill)		Radcliffe Rd, Lever Bridge Fold 53°34′14″N 2°24′16″W	1784	in use	
	Notes: 1784-John Leech; 1787-William Gray; 1891–William Gray & Son Ltd, 21,000 spindles, 608/1058 weft, 568/658 twist; 420 looms, fine jacconettes and cambrics 1950s–1960s Bolton Heald Co; 2016– Multiple use				
Well Bank Mill					
	Notes: 1871-Thomas Fletcher				

== Rumworth ==
Name	Architect	Location	Built	Demolished	Served (Years)
Alma Mills		Prescott St	c.1884		
	Notes: 1891-William Moores and Sons, 36 looms				
Bankfield Mill		Quebec St	1883		143
Croal Mill	Bradshaw, Gass & Hope	Blackshaw Lane 53°34′21″N 2°27′10″W	1908	In use	
	Notes: Grade II listed building Croal Spinning Co Ltd; 1967-Closed as cotton mill Engine:1300hp vertical triple expansion engine, named "Shelagh", by Yates and Thom of Blackburn installed in 1908.				
Cygnet Mills		Adelaide St			
	Notes: 1925 Cygnet Mill Co Ltd				
Daubhill Mill		Daubhill	c.1900	<2016	
	Notes: 1900-Hollas and Farnworth				
Deane Mill		Langshaw Rd	c.1884	1962	
	Notes: 1891 Henry Poole & Co, 32,400 spindles				
Lincoln Mill		Washington St 53°34′24″N 2°26′55″W	1893–1920	In use	
	Notes: 1884-Robert Entwistle and Co; 1891-49 looms 1900-Robert Entwistle and Co Ltd; 1962-Closed as textile mill (Vantona); 1985-Littlewoods Ltd; Bolton Enterprise Centre				
Melrose Mill		Blackshaw Lane	c.1884	<2008	
	Notes: 1884-Joseph Constantine; 1891-Melrose Mill Co Ltd, 32,824 spindles 1925 Sakel Spinning Co Ltd, Branch of Maco Spinning Co Ltd; 1980s-Demolished; Allotments				
Merton Mill		Oriel St/Alice St	1908	1966	58
	Notes: 1925-Merton Spinning Co Ltd; 1950-Merton Spinning Co (Crosses and Heatons Ltd); 1960-Closed as mill and occupied by Buxted; 1963 Bolton's tallest chimney demolished 1966-Mill demolished 1985-Site redeveloped for housing				
Middle Brook Mill		Gilnow Lane		demolished	
	Notes: 1891-Salmon and Taylor Ltd, 41,300 spindles				
Rutland Mills (Howard Mill)		Adelaide St	1920		106
	Notes: 1891-Wareham, Hargreaves and Co, 90 looms				
Rumworth Mill		St Helens Rd 53°33′49″N 2°26′57″W	1880	In use	
	Notes: 1884-Sydney Marsland and Co. 1891 31,000 spindles 1900-W H Brown and Son. 1925-Rumworth Spinning Co Ltd. 1950-Rumworth Spinning Co. 1960s-Lantor Ltd. 1985-Lantor (UK) Ltd (Tootal Ltd)				
Stanley Mill (Deane Shed, Wharf Mill)		Kirkebrok St 53°33′58″N 2°27′49″W	1906	In use	
	Notes: 1925-Joseph Johnson (Bolton) Ltd; 1960s-Joseph Johnson (Bolton) Ltd; 1971 Closed as cotton mill 1970s-B A Brown Ltd and Plushpile (Wharf Mill) Ltd; Multiple use as Stanley Mill and Wharf Mill; Engine: 350hp cross compound engine by J & E Wood				
Stanley Mills (Cannon's Mill)		Jackson St	1868	1974	106
	Notes: 1884-Cannon Brothers; 1891 68,000 spindles 1910-Mill extended 1924-Mill extended again 1971– Mill closed as Cannon Brothers (Spirella Group); 1974-Demolished and site redeveloped 1985-Site of Supermarket (Hilliards, Kwik-Save)				
Sunnyside Mill (Tootals)	George Woodhouse	Adelaide St 53°33′46″N 2°26′59″W	1862	1980	118
	Notes: 1888-Tootal Broadhurst Lee; 1891 73,000 spindles 1968-English Calico Ltd; 1973-Tootal Ltd; 1980-Closed and later demolished				

== Smithills ==
Name	Architect	Location	Built	Demolished	Served (Years)
Barrow Bridge Mills (Dean Mills)		Barrow Bridge	1831	1913	82
	Notes: 1843-Gardner and Bazley; 1862-William Romaine Callender; 1871-Callender and Son; 1877-Closed; 1895-Dean Mills Company; 1913-Mills demolished				
Britannia Mill (Cobden St Mill, Hill Mill)		Cobden St	1848		178
Delph Hill Mill		Chorley Old Rd, Doffcocker	1800	1970	170
	Notes: Lambert Heaton (succeeding John Heaton); 1821–1822 John Mawdsley; 1843-Peter Heaton and Sons; 1853-Thomas and Joseph Heaton; 1860–1872 James Whittaker; 1872-William Heaton; 1884-Robert Whittaker; 1891 together with Lostock Junction: Thomas and Joseph Heaton – William Heaton, 80,000 spindles Engine: 1000hp cross compound engine by John Musgrave & Sons of Bolton installed 1903. Also 1500hp triple expansion horizontal engine by Musgraves, 1901.				
Heatons Mill		Picton St, Doffcocker	1790s	1940s	
	Notes: 1790s John Heaton				

== Tonge with the Haugh ==
Name	Architect	Location	Built	Demolished	Served (Years)
Hope Mills (Ainsworth Lane)		Ainsworth Lane	c.1919		
	Notes: 1919-Nathan Ramsden and Sons Ltd; 1950-Fansinit Yarn Co Ltd; 1985 Ainsworth Down and Quilt Company				

== Westhoughton with Chew Moor ==
Name	Architect	Location	Built	Demolished	Served (Years)
Albion Mill (Haworths)		Manchester Road, Wingates	1894	Demolished	
	Notes: 1871-John Pilkington; 1938-Burned down				
Allenby Mill		Wigan Rd, Westhoughton 53°32′39″N 2°31′52″W	1922	in use	
	Notes: 1976-Closed down 2016-M & A Pharmachem; 2022-Crescent Medical				
Bolton Road Mill		Bolton Rd, Westhoughton 53°33′11″N 2°30′58″W	1913		113
	Notes: 1891-William Walsh, 564 looms				
Chew Moor Mill (Holland Mill, Holdsworth Mill)		St John's Rd, Chew Moor	c.1853		
	Notes: 1853-Platt and Sutcliffe; 1871-R Entwistle and Co; 1884-Chew Moor Mill Ltd; 1985-Greenham Tools Ltd				
Glebe Mill		Library St, Westhoughton 53°32′57″N 2°31′13″W		2015	
	Notes: 574 looms 2018 Aldi Supermarket				
Grove Lane Mill		53°32′50″N 2°31′40″W	1920	c. 2014	
	Notes: 616 looms 2014-Labour Club; 2016-Lidl Supermarket				
Kemp's Mill		Victoria Street, Westhoughton 53°32′54″N 2°31′16″W	1870	In use	
	Notes: Silk mill				
Peel Mill		Church Street, Westhoughton	1850	demolished	
	Notes: John Chadwick Silk Mill; 1891-250 looms 1907– Closed down Site developed for housing				
Perseverance Mill		Bolton Road, Westhoughton 53°33′10″N 2°30′55″W	1911	Demolished 2017	
	Notes: 1891-William Crabtree, 600 looms Site under development for housing				
Rose Hill Mill					
	Notes: 1891-Stephen Braddock, 8020 spindles				
Victoria Mill aka Ames Mill		Church St, Wingates 53°33′34″N 2°31′29″W	late 1800s	2005	
	Notes: 1891-Higson and Biggs, 40,000 spindles 1925 Gt Lever Spinning Co; Ames (Europe); Site developed for housing				
Westhoughton Mill		Mill St, Westhoughton 53°32′54″N 2°31′11″W	1804	1912	108
	Notes: 1812– burnt by Luddite rioters. Rebuilt as corn mill 1840– Peter Ditchfield. Building converted back to cotton mill. Site undeveloped				

== Other textile based work places in Bolton ==
Name	Architect	Location	Built	Demolished	Served (Years)
Bark St Mills (flax mill)		Bolton, @			
Bee Hive Mill (Tootals)		Bolton, @			
Bee Hive Works		Bolton, @			
Blair and Sumner's Bleachworks					
Borough Mills					
Bradshaw Works					
Breightmet Bleachworks		Bolton, @			
Bridgeman Place Machine Works					
Bridson's Bleachworks		Bolton, @			
Burnden Bleach Works		Bolton, @			
Cannon St Mill					
Carlisle's Cotton Mill		Bolton, @			
Darley St Mills					
Daubhill Hosiery Works		Bolton, @			
Dunscar Bleachworks					
Eagley Bleachworks					
Egerton Dye Works		Bolton, @			
Firwood Bleachworks					
Flax Mill		Bolton, @			
Gilnow Rd Bleachworks		Bolton, @			
Gladstone St Mills (Perseverance Mill)		Bolton, @			
Great Lever Bleachworks		Bolton, @			
Halliwell Bleachworks		Bolton, @			
Halliwell Rd Clothing Works		Bolton, @			
Cotton Works, Burton factory		Bolton, @			
Harwood Vale Bleachworks					
Howell Croft Mill					
Little Bolton Bleachworks		Bolton, @			
Longworth New Mill					
Lords Water Mill					
Mawdsley St Mill					
Mill Hill Bleachworks		Bolton, @			
Mortfield Bleachworks		Bolton, @			
Newton St Works					
Oakenbottom Mill					
Orient Mill Brandwood St Bolton					
Park Saw Mills					
Parkfield Mill					
Pikes Lane Mill					
Pinfold Mill (victoria mills					
Platt St Works (weaving shed					
Raikes Lane Bleachworks		Bolton, @			
Red Bridge Mill (shed					
River St Mill					
Riversdale Mill					
Rose Hill Tannery		Bolton, @			
Royal Works					
Rumworth Cotton Works					
Sharples Bleachworks		Bolton, @			
Sharples Mill (Vale Mill)		Bolton, @			
Shifnall Mill					
Shifnall St Mill					
Smithills Bleachworks					
Spa Rd Bleachworks					
Spring Gardens Mill					
Springfield Bleachworks					
St Helens Rd Hosiery Works					
Taylor Field Mill					
Taylor's Mill (?Victoria Mill, Horwich)					
Temple Bleachworks					
Thynne St Mill					
Thynne St Works					
Tonge Fold Mill					
Tonge Mill					
Tootill Bridge Finishing Works					
Top Croft Bleachworks this later Became the site for North End Mill Later Automotive Products					
Tuner Bridge Mill					
Turton St New Mill					
Twisse's Dye Works*		Bolton, @			
Undershore Bleachworks					
Vale Mill		Bolton, @			
Victoria Mills					
Victoria Mills (Victoria St)		Bolton, @			
Victoria Works (Garside St)		Bolton, @			
Wallsuches Bleachworks		Bolton, @			
Waters Meeting Bleachworks					
Wellington Mills					
Worsted Mill					
