= Charles E. Anderson =

American doctor of meteorology (1919–1994)

- Born: August 13, 1919; Clayton, Missouri
- Died: 1994 (aged 74–75)
- Education: Lincoln University

Charles E. Anderson (1919–1994) was the first African American to receive a Ph.D. in Meteorology. He was a dean at University of Wisconsin, Madison.

== Biography ==
=== Higher education and army life ===
Anderson was born on August 13, 1919, in Clayton, Missouri, a suburb of St. Louis. His mother and father were from Mississippi. He earned a bachelor of science degree in Chemistry in 1941 from Lincoln University and received high accolades as he graduated third in his class. Lincoln University was also the place where he met his wife-to-be, Marjorie Anderson. Upon graduating, World War II had begun and he enlisted in U.S. Army Air Forces. He was assigned to the meteorology division and Anderson claims that this came about due to the process of elimination. The Army sent him, along with 150 other cadets to the University of Chicago to study meteorology. While there along with an exceptionally heavy academic course load, Anderson also underwent physical training, weapons training, and specific training in military intelligence. Anderson completed this training in May 1943 and earned his meteorological certification. Upon finishing, he was stationed in Tuskegee, Alabama where he was assigned as a weather officer for the 332nd Fighter Group now known as the Tuskegee Airmen. After his service in Tuskegee, Anderson became a squadron weather officer and trained fighter pilots across the country.

== Post-war career ==
Anderson temporarily left the Army Air Corps after the war to pursue an opportunity in high polymer chemistry at the Polytechnic Institute of Brooklyn in 1946. After receiving his master's degree, Anderson became a research and development officer for Watson Laboratories, supervising the works of many notable German scientists. In 1955, Anderson decided to further pursue his academic studies and applied to the doctoral program in Meteorology at the Massachusetts Institute of Technology. During this time he wrote his dissertation: "A Study of the Pulsating Growth of Cumulus Clouds." Anderson earned his Ph.D. in 1960, becoming the first African American to earn a Ph.D. in Meteorology.
