= Charles Anderson (cricketer) =

Irish cricketer

Personal information
- Full name: Charles Stewart Anderson
- Born: 29 December 1881; Holywood, Ireland
- Died: 1 March 1943 (aged 61); Portrush, Northern Ireland
- Batting: Right-handed
- Bowling: Right-arm off break Right-arm medium

Domestic team information
- Years: Team
- 1926: Ireland

Career statistics
Competition	First-class
Matches	1
Runs scored	0
Batting average	0.00
100s/50s	–/–
Top score	0
Balls bowled	78
Wickets	0
Bowling average	–
5 wickets in innings	–
10 wickets in match	–
Best bowling	–
Catches/stumpings	–/–
- Source: Cricinfo, 28 October 2021

Charles Stewart Anderson (29 December 1881 – 1 March 1943) was an Irish cricketer. He was a right-handed batsman and bowled both right-arm medium-pace and off-breaks. He played just once for Ireland, a first-class match against Oxford University in 1926. He had little success in the match, as he was dismissed without scoring and bowled 13 overs without taking a wicket.
