= Lostock Hall Gatehouse =

Listed building in Greater Manchester, England

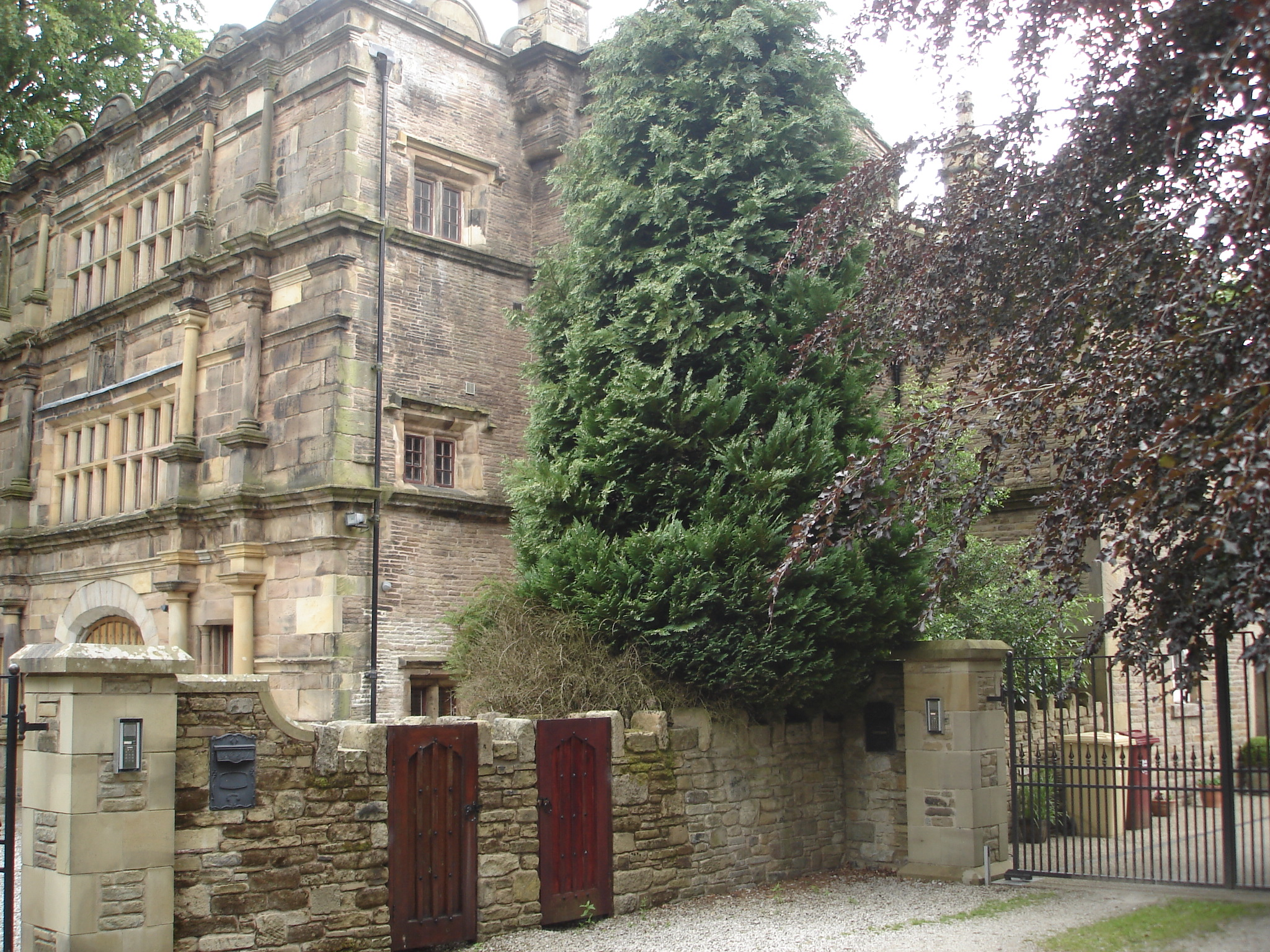
- Lostock Hall Gatehouse

- Location within Greater Manchester

General information
- Location: Hall Lane, Lostock, Greater Manchester, England
- Coordinates: 53.5772°N 2.5204°W
- Year built: c. 1590

Technical details
- Material: Ashlar
- Floor count: 3

Design and construction
- Designations

Listed Building – Grade II*
- Official name: Former gatehouse to Lostock Hall (demolished) with cottage range to rear
- Designated: 23 April 1952
- Reference no.: 1388054

Lostock Hall Gatehouse is an Elizabethan building on Hall Lane in Lostock, a western suburb of Bolton in Greater Manchester, England.

The now-demolished Lostock Hall, built as a manor house for the Anderton family, was a half-timbered structure with four overhanging gables. Above the entrance door were the initials "CAD", representing Christopher Anderton and his wife Dorothy, together with the date "1563". Most of the rooms were wainscoted with numerous panels. During the 18th and early 19th centuries, the hall was used as a farmhouse. In 1816 part of the hall was demolished, and the remainder was taken down in 1824.

The gatehouse, designated a Grade II* listed building in 1952, is all that remains of the hall. The main front is constructed of ashlar, while the other three sides are faced with thin coursed rubble. The central arch, originally open so that a person could ride through, has since been built up with a doorway. The ground floor was originally without windows, but two sash windows have been inserted between the Tuscan columns, one on each side of the door. The upper-floor windows are flanked by pairs of widely spaced Ionic and Corinthian columns. Above the first-floor window is a square panel bearing the Anderton coat of arms, and above the second-floor window is a shield with the royal arms of Queen Elizabeth I, together with the date "1591" and the royal initials "E.R.". For many years the gatehouse was also used as a farmhouse, but it is now a private residence.

== See also ==
- Anderton baronets
- Grade II* listed buildings in Greater Manchester
- Listed buildings in Bolton
