= Paul Anderton =

Australian amateur bodybuilder

- Professional bodybuilder
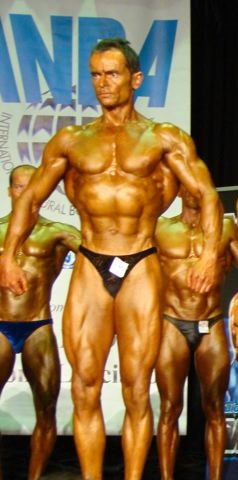
- Paul Anderton posing during Masters 40-49, 2007

Personal info
- Born: 22 January 1962 (age 64); Newmarket, England

Best statistics
- Height: 5 ft 8 in (1.73 m)
- Weight: Contest: 72kg

Professional (Pro) career
- Best win: 2nd place INBA Mr. Olympia, Masters; 2007

Paul Anderton (born 1962) is an amateur bodybuilder from Australia who won 1st place, INBA - International Natural Bodybuilding Association, Mr. SA, Masters, 2007. He is also an entrepreneur and inventor of the "AMP Your Workout" training system.

== Early life ==
Paul was born in Newmarket, England in 1962. His family moved to Australia in 1965. He was always of slight build. At the age of 14 (and a weight of 33 kg, 72Lb) he was diagnosed with a condition that caused delayed puberty. He started weight training as a means to compensate for his small stature but was advised that he'd "never do well at it" due to his late growth. Though his doctor was right regarding his growth issues, Paul was able, through persistence, to compete in bodybuilding.

Paul is life-time natural and relied upon research and a systematic approach to training and nutrition over many years to eventually create a reasonable physique from his small frame.

== Bodybuilding ==
=== INBA ===
Having originally competed in his twenties with some moderate success, but deciding to no longer compete in competitions where steroids were allowed (the only competitions available at the time), Paul regained interest in competition upon learning of the INBA - International Natural Bodybuilding Association. He was head judge for the INBA SA competitions (Adelaide Classic and Mr/Ms SA titles) from 2002 to 2005. He decided to return to competition in 2006 and placed 2nd in the Masters division of the Mr. SA, and subsequently competed in the Mr. Australia, (4th in the Masters division) and the Mr. Olympia contest. He did not place at the 2006 Olympia but set a goal to compete again in 2007. He placed second in the Masters of the 2007 Olympia in Thesonoliki, Greece.

In 2008, Paul missed a placing in the Mr. Olympia but placed 3rd in Mr. Universe Masters division a week later in Corona LA.

In 2009, Paul started his PT business and again competed in Mr. SA, Mr. Australia, and Mr. Olympia. Ahe t the age of 47, placed third in the Masters and fifth in the Men's Open Short Class.

== Bodybuilding titles ==
- 3rd place, INBA Mr. Olympia, Masters, 2009, Gold Coast
- 3rd place, INBA Mr. Universe, Masters, 2008, LA
- 2nd place, INBA Mr. Olympia, Masters, 2007, Greece
- 1st place, INBA Mr. SA, Masters, 2007
- 2nd place, INBA Mr. SA, Masters, 2006
- "Most Muscular", INBA Mr. SA, Masters, 2006

== DVDs ==
- 1987 SABBA Adelaide Physique Classic Show
- 1988 SABBA Adelaide Physique Classic: The Show
- 1988 SABBA Adelaide Physique Classic: Judging
- 2007 MAX's South Australian INBA Natural Physique & Figure Titles
- 2009 South Australian INBA Natural Physique & Figure Titles
