= Michael Anderton =

English clergyman, psychologist, and cricketer (1931–2020)

Personal information
- Full name: Frederic Michael Anderton
- Born: 7 December 1931; Agra, India
- Died: 28 April 2020 (aged 88)
- Batting: Right handed
- Bowling: Right-arm off-break

Domestic team information
- Years: Team
- 1953: Cambridge University

Career statistics
| Competition | FC |
|---|---|
| Matches | 3 |
| Runs scored | 64 |
| Batting average | 16 |
| 100s/50s | -/- |
| Top score | 38 |
| Balls bowled | 16 |
| Wickets | 0 |
| Bowling average | - |
| 5 wickets in innings | - |
| 10 wickets in match | - |
| Best bowling | - |
| Catches/stumpings | 2/- |
- Source: , 21 July 2020

The Reverend Frederic Michael Anderton (7 December 1931 – 28 April 2020) was an English clergyman, distinguished Jungian analyst and a first-class cricketer who played for Cambridge University Cricket Club.

== Early life and cricket ==
He was born in Agra in India, where his father, Colonel Geoffrey Anderton, was a doctor with the British Army. Through his mother, the former Edyth Cecile Hastings, he was descended from the family line of the Earls of Huntingdon. Shortly before World War II began, the family returned to England. He went to Sherborne School, where he became Head Boy and excelled at sport. On the occasion of the school's four hundredth anniversary, he was the host for a lunch attended by King George VI and his wife, Queen Elizabeth.

After National Service with the Green Jackets Brigade, he went up to Pembroke College, Cambridge in 1952, originally to read Medicine but eventually graduating in History and Economics. He played both rugby and cricket for the University, including three first-class cricket matches in 1953, but he did not win a cricket Blue. His highest score of 38 came when playing against Middlesex County Cricket Club.

== Career ==
=== Priest ===
After university, he was briefly a schoolmaster before he entered Westcott House to train to become an Anglican priest. After being ordained, he became a curate at St John's Wood Church, before moving to All Hallows by the Tower. This was the Guild Church of the Toc H movement, and he was with Tubby Clayton, its founder, when Clayton died.

=== Psychologist ===
He became the chairman of the Guild of Pastoral Psychology and, through his work with the Guild, was influenced in middle age to give up his career as a priest to become a psychotherapist. He trained at the C.G. Jung Institute in Zurich, before setting up his own psychotherapy practice in London, where – according to his Daily Telegraph obituarist – "his deep intellect and innate sensitivity allowed him to bring profound insights to bear". In 1987 he helped to set up the Guild of Analytical Psychology and Spirituality – since renamed as the Guild of Analytical Psychologists – which particularly focused on the religious and spiritual aspects of Carl Jung's work.

Anderton's consulting room was notable for its clouds of smoke from his pipe. He gave up smoking in his seventies, but continued to work into his mid-eighties while in semi-retirement in Winchester.

== Personal life ==
He had a life-long love of cricket, and it was after a Test at Lord's that he first met Robin Coulson, whom he married in 1977. They had a daughter. MCC made him an honorary life member in 2018, sixty years after his first having been elected to membership.

He was a bon viveur and a large but gentle man who was inclined to be absent-minded and clumsy, leaving "a trail of broken armchairs and pranged cars". He enjoyed the company of his family and friends and the life of the Winchester Cathedral community.

Anderton died on 28 April 2020, at the age of 88.
