= Laurence Anderton =

English Jesuit

Laurence Anderton, alias Scroop (1577–1643), was a learned English Jesuit.

Anderton was born in Lancashire in 1577, being the son of Thomas Anderton, of Horwich, and brother of Christopher Anderton, of Lostock, near Bolton. Having learned his rudiments at the grammar school of Blackburn, he was sent from thence to Christ's College, Cambridge, where he was admired for his brilliant genius and ready eloquence, upon which account he was commonly called ‘Golden-mouth Anderton.’ He took the degree of B.A. in 1596–7, and it is said that he became a clergyman of the established Church of England. Dodd, the historian, relates that Anderton, ‘being much addicted to reading books of controversy, could not get over some difficulties he met with concerning the origin and doctrines of the Reformation, which at last ended in his conversion to the Catholic Church.’ Anthony à Wood, in reference to this turning-point in Anderton's career, observes that ‘his mind hanging after the Roman Catholic religion, he left that college (at Cambridge) and his country, and, shipping himself beyond the seas, entered into Roman Catholic orders, and became one of the learnedest among the papists.’ Proceeding to Rome, he entered the Society of Jesus in 1604, and became a very distinguished member of the English province. His missionary life, which extended over nearly forty years, in times of difficulty and danger, was chiefly passed in his native county, where he died on 17 April 1643. He was remarkable for his talent in preaching, and gave proof of his ability in controversy in his publications.

== Works ==
- One God, One Faith, under the initials of W. B., 8vo, 1625
- The Progenie of Catholics and Protestants, whereby on the one side is proved the lineal descent of Catholics, for the Roman faith and religion, from the Holie Fathers of the Primitive Church, even from Christs verie time until these our dayes, and on the other the never being of Protestants during al the foresayd time, Rouen, 1633, 4to
- The Triple Cord; or, a Treatise proving the Truth of the Roman Religion, by Sacred Scriptures, taken in the literal sense, expounded by ancient Fathers, interpreted by Protestant writers. With a Discouery of sundry subtile Sleights vsed by Protestants, for euading the force of strongest Arguments, taken from cleerest Texts of the foresaid Scriptures, St. Omer, 1634, 4to, a stout volume of 801 pages.
