= Lostock, Bolton =

Coordinates: 53.580°N 2.527°W

Lostock
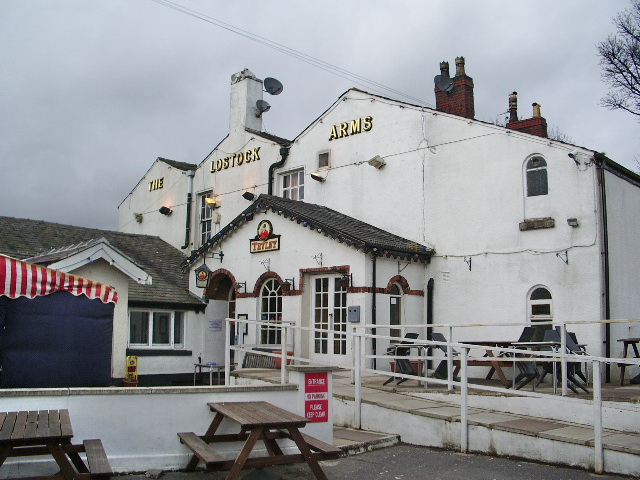
- Lostock Arms, Lostock

- Location within Greater Manchester
- OS grid reference: SD652094
- Metropolitan borough: Bolton
- Metropolitan county: Greater Manchester
- Region: North West
- Country: England
- Sovereign state: United Kingdom
- Post town: BOLTON
- Postcode district: BL6
- Dialling code: 01204
- Police: Greater Manchester
- Fire: Greater Manchester
- Ambulance: North West
- UK Parliament: Bolton West

Lostock is a residential district of Bolton, Greater Manchester, England, 3.5 miles (5.6 km) west of Bolton town centre and 13 miles (21 km) northwest of Manchester. Historically part of Lancashire, Lostock is bounded by Deane to the southeast, Markland Hill to the northeast, and Middlebrook to the west. Bolton Wanderers' football ground, the University of Bolton Stadium, is in Lostock.

After a railway station was built to serve the area in 1852, the area around the station – some 1.5 miles (2.4 km) east of Lostock Hall – became known as Lostock Junction. This name is still in use, although the station's name has changed to Lostock.

== History ==
The name derives from Old English hlose a pig and stoc meaning a farm, usually 'stock' or 'Stoke' in place-names, but here referring to a pigsty. Another source suggested that the name is derived from Celtic, llostog meaning beaver, inferring the site of a stream where beavers were found, the reasoning due to the proliferation of Brythonic and Celtic place-names in Lancashire. It has been variously recorded as Lostoc in 1212; Lastok in 1279; Lostok in 1292; Lostoke in 1301 and Lostock and Lostocke in the 16th century.

In the Middle Ages Lostock was part of the barony of Manchester. It was subsequently held by Richard de Hulton and passed to the Andertons and the Blundells of Ince. Lostock Hall was an Elizabethan manor house built for the Anderton family in 1563. The hall was demolished in 1824, but the gatehouse remains and is a Grade II* listed building.

During World War II, De Havilland aircraft propellers were produced at Lostock.

== Local government ==
Lostock was a township in the ancient parish of Bolton le Moors, in the hundred of Salford, in the historic county of Lancashire. In 1837 Lostock joined with other townships in the area to form the Bolton Poor Law Union and took joint responsibility for the administration and funding of the Poor Law in that area. In 1866, Lostock became a civil parish, and in 1894 it became part of the Bolton Rural District, which was dissolved in 1898. Under the Bolton Turton and Westhoughton Extension Act 1898 (61 & 62 Vict. c. ccxlii), Lostock ceased to be a civil parish on 30 September and became part of the County Borough of Bolton. In 1891 the parish had a population of 891.

Lostock is part of the Heaton and Lostock Ward, one of twenty wards in the Metropolitan Borough of Bolton. The population of the ward at the 2011 Census was 13,564. The ward has three councillors who are elected for up to four years and represent the Lostock and Heaton areas.

== Geography ==
Lostock was a hamlet covering 1,364 acres of land 4½ miles west of Bolton. Chew Moor in the southwest was the principal settlement of the township, it was a cluster of cottages housing the landless labourers and tenant farmers.

== Demography ==
=== Township population ===
Population changes of the township/civil parish of Lostock

Year	Population	±%
1801	509	—
1811	540	+6.1%
1821	576	+6.7%
1831	606	+5.2%

Year	Population	±%
1841	625	+3.1%
1851	620	−0.8%
1861	580	−6.5%
1871	670	+15.5%

Year	Population	±%
1881	782	+16.7%
1891	891	+13.9%

Sources: Vision of Britain - Lostock Tn/CP: Total Population.

=== Ward population ===
In 1898, Lostock became part of the Deane-cum-Lostock Ward of the County Borough of Bolton. The ward's boundaries were used as a framework in censuses to enumerate the total population in that area of the county borough. No census took place in 1941 because of the Second World War.

Population changes of the Deane-cum-Lostock Ward

Year	Population	±%
1901	3,204	—
1911	4,167	+30.1%
1921	4,612	+10.7%

Year	Population	±%
1931	5,873	+27.3%
1951	5,824	−0.8%
1961	5,773	−0.9%

Year	Population	±%
1971	8,323	+44.2%

Source: Pauline Tatton, Local population statistics 1801–1986, Bolton Central Library.

In 1974, Lostock became part of the Deane-cum-Heaton Ward of the Metropolitan Borough of Bolton. In the 2001 Census the ward had a population of 16,987. In 2004, electoral ward changes took place which saw the creation of the present Heaton and Lostock Ward.

== Transport ==
Lostock is located north of junctions 5 and 6 of the M61 motorway. The main roads which run through Lostock are the A58 (Beaumont Road), the A673 (Chorley New Road), and the A6027 (De Havilland Way).

Lostock railway station was re-opened in 1988 and is served by Northern who operate services on the Manchester to Preston line. The earlier railway station, then named Lostock Junction, was opened in 1852, but was closed by the Beeching cuts in November 1966.

== Education ==
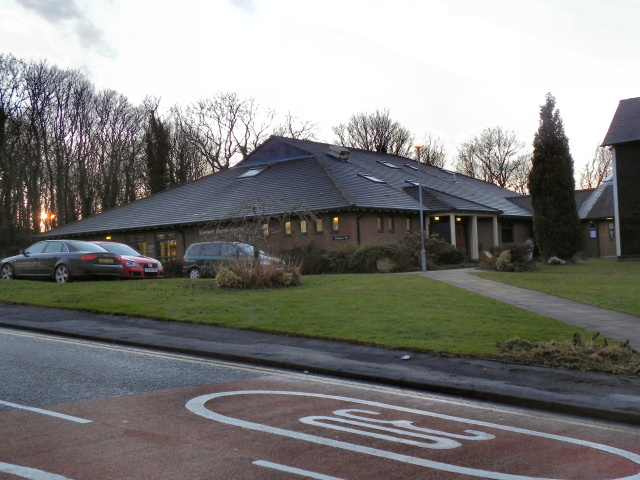
Lostock Parish Centre

Lostock Playschool, established in 1977, is situated in the Lostock Parish Centre which opened in 1992 on Tempest Road. Lostock Primary School is situated on Glengarth Drive. Built in 1974, the school has a maximum of 210 pupils.

Bolton Wanderers Free School is a sixth form centre that opened at the Macron Stadium in September 2014.

== Sport ==
Chew Moor is home to football clubs Tempest United and CMB Sports Club. The youth teams of Ladybridge F.C. moved to the Rumworth area in 2003.

Lostock Tennis Club, Regent Road, Lostock. Newly-augmented, environmentally friendly floodlights (2022) make this tennis and table tennis club one of the best appointed in Bolton, and even the North West. There are four men's teams and five mixed teams which play in the Bolton Sport's Federation's (BSF) summer tennis leagues. A women's team plays in the Walkden Tennis league. Many active players take part in the BSF's winter league. In addition there is a great deal of activity around Youth tennis and coaching, with mixed teams taking part on the BSF's league.

== See also ==
- Anderton baronets
- Anderton family
- Lostock Junction Mills
