= Charles Anderson (businessman) =

American businessman

- Born: November 14, 1917; Columbus, Ohio, US
- Died: April 17, 2009 (aged 91); Palo Alto, California, US
- Education: University of California, Berkeley; Harvard Business School
- Scientific career
- Workplaces: Magna Power Tool Company; Stanford Business School; Kern Country Land Company; SRI International

Charles A. Anderson (November 14, 1917 – April 17, 2009) was an American businessman. He was the CEO and president of SRI International from 1968 to 1980.

== Early life and education ==
Anderson was born in Columbus, Ohio, on November 14, 1917; his family moved to Berkeley, California, not long thereafter. Anderson graduated from the University of California, Berkeley in 1938 with a bachelor of science in chemistry, and then graduated from Harvard Business School in 1940 with a master's of business administration.

== Career ==
After graduating from Harvard, Anderson married Betty Rushforth in 1942 and served in the United States Navy during World War II. Upon his return from the war, he was an assistant professor of business administration at Harvard.

In 1948, Anderson moved back to California, and was a vice president of Magna Power Tool Company. From 1958 to 1961, he joined the Stanford Business School as the department's associate dean and a professor of business administration.

In 1961, he became the vice president of finance for Kern Country Land Company. He was subsequently the CEO of Kern Country's subsidiaries Walker Manufacturing and J.I. Case. Kern Country was purchased by Tenneco in August 1967.

In 1968, Anderson became the CEO of SRI International, a position he held until his retirement in 1980. Anderson was also on numerous corporate boards, including Conoco, Boise Cascade, Eaton Corporation, NCR Corporation, Owens Corning, Saga Foods (purchased by Marriott Corporation), and Kansai Research Institute (now KRI, Inc.).

== Reception ==
Anderson was on the Air Force Systems Command Board of Visitors, and was given an Air Force Exceptional Service Award as a result. He was also named Bay Area Harvard Business School Business Statesman of the Year.
