= Charles W. Anderson (soldier) =

United States Army Medal of Honor recipient (1844-1916)

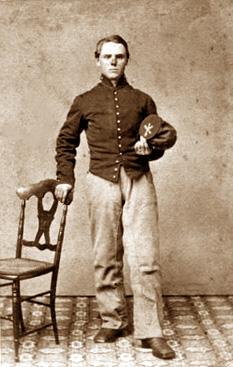
- Charles W. Anderson, Medal of Honor recipient
- Born: March 15, 1844; Baltimore, Maryland, U.S.
- Died: February 25, 1916 (aged 71)
- Burial place: Thornrose Cemetery (Staunton, Virginia)
- Military career
- Allegiance: United States
- Branch: United States Army; Union Army
- Service years: 1864–1865, 1866–1878
- Rank: Private
- Unit: (New York (state)) 1st Regiment New York Volunteer Cavalry (Lincoln Cavalry)
- Conflicts: American Civil War
- Awards: Medal of Honor

Charles W. Anderson (born George Pforr from March 15, 1844 – February 25, 1916) was an American soldier who received the Medal of Honor for valor during the American Civil War.

== Biography ==
Anderson was born George Pforr on March 15, 1844, in Baltimore, Maryland. He enlisted in the Confederate States Army and served in an artillery battery under Captain Jonathan H. McClanahan, part of General John Imboden’s cavalry brigade.

In February 1864, he deserted and enlisted in the 1st Regiment New York Volunteer Cavalry (Lincoln Cavalry) using the name Charles W. Anderson and the birthplace of New Orleans, Louisiana. He was assigned to Company K under Captain Edwin F. Savacool.

On March 2, 1865, at Fishersville, Virginia, Anderson captured a Confederate flag during the Battle of Waynesboro. On March 19, 1865, Anderson and other soldiers who had captured flags were given a 30-day furlough and the Medal of Honor by Secretary of War Edwin M. Stanton.

Anderson mustered out in June 1865, but re-enlisted in Company M, 3rd United States Cavalry on January 11, 1866. He served 12 years, participating in the Indian Wars before receiving a hardship discharge on April 4, 1878.

Anderson settled in Staunton, Virginia, near his sister Mary, and returned to his birth name of George Pforr. He married Sally Smith Garber on September 18, 1878. He applied for a Federal pension in 1905 for his military service, which was granted in 1906.

At some point in 1909 Anderson served as the president of the Dinner Committee and Toastmaster for a presentation and complimentary dinner by the Colored Citizens of New York and Vicinity. At this dinner he presented a gold watch and chain to Matthew Henson.

He died on February 25, 1916, at the age of 71. He is buried in Thornrose Cemetery in Staunton, Virginia; section 10, lot 87

== Medal of Honor citation ==
- Capture of unknown Confederate flag.

== See also ==
- List of American Civil War Medal of Honor recipients: A–F
