= Thomas Anderton =

Thomas Anderton (1611 – 9 October 1671) was an English Benedictine.

He was born in Lancashire, the sixth son of William Anderton, Esq., of Euxton, and Isabel, daughter of William Hancock of Pendle Hall, Lower Higham, Padiham, Lancaster. Both his parents remained Catholic in spite of persecution.

Thomas made his profession in 1630, at the Benedictine monastery of St. Edmund, in Paris, and in 1636 was ordained priest, and successively became Novice-Master, Sub-Prior, and, in 1640, Prior of St. Edmund's. In 1641 he was Definitor, and in 1657 secretary to the chapter. From 1661 to 1666 he was Prior of St. Benedict's monastery at Saint Malo, and again Prior of St. Edmund's in Paris, from 1668 to 1669.

Sent out on the English mission, he died at Saxton Hall in Yorkshire.

== Works ==
- Concordia scientiae cum fide, 1659.
- History of the Iconoclasts during the Reign of the Emperors Leo Isaureus, Constantin Copronimus, Leo IV, Constantin and Irene, Leo the Armenian, Michael Balbus, Theophilus, Michael III, and Theodora, 1671.
- A soveraign remedy against atheism and heresy. Fitted for the wit, and want of the British Nations, 1672.
