= James Anderton (controversialist) =

English Roman Catholic lawyer, official and controversialist

James Anderton (1557 – 1613) was an English Roman Catholic lawyer, official and controversialist. In the first quarter of the seventeenth century, he published several learned works under the name of ‘John Brereley, Priest.’

== Works ==
His publications include The Protestants Apologie for the Roman Church. Deuided into three seuerall Tractes. It passed through three editions. He also published That communion of the Eucharist to the Laity under one kind is lawful. The ceremonies also of the Masse now used in the Catholicke Church, are all of them derived from the Primitive Church, Cologne, 1620, of 469 pages, and St. Austin's Religion collected from his own Writings,’ 1620, which was replied to by William Crompton in a work entitled Saint Austin's Religion: wherein is manifestly proued out of the Workes of that learned Father that he dissented from Poperie. London, 1624 and 1625. The second edition of this reply was revised by Archbishop William Laud at the direction of King Charles I, as appears from a passage in the archbishop's diary. Anderton's The Reformed Protestant is mentioned by John Gee in his catalogue of popish books.

== Notes ==
Attribution

This article incorporates text from a publication now in the public domain: "Anderton, James". Dictionary of National Biography. London: Smith, Elder & Co. 1885–1900.
