= Robert Anderton =

English Roman Catholic priest and martyr

Blessed Robert Anderton
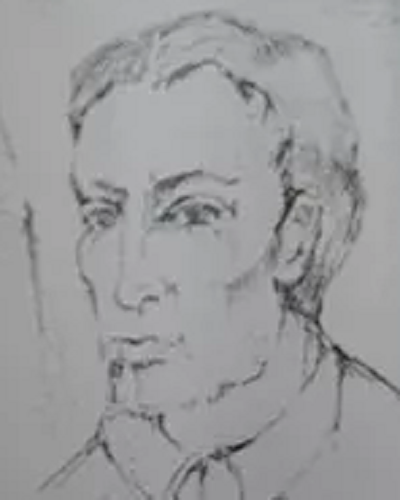

Priest and Martyr
- Born: c. 1560; Lancashire or Isle of Man
- Died: 25 April 1586 (aged 25 - 26); Isle of Wight
- Venerated in: Roman Catholic Church
- Beatified: 15 December 1929 by Pope Pius XI
- Feast: 25 April (together with his companion); 29 October (one of the Douai Martyrs)

Robert Anderton (c. 1560 – 25 April 1586) was an English or Manx Catholic priest and martyr under the Elizabethan era religious persecution. Along with his companion, William Marsden, he was beatified by Pope Pius XI in 1929.

== Biographies ==
Robert Anderton was born, according to some sources in Lancashire and according to William Blundell on the Isle of Man, around 1560.

He probably attended Brasenose College and graduated from Oxford University in 1578. While at Reims, Anderton was regarded as an excellent preacher, and a gifted teacher. He was ordained 31 March 1585.

William Marsden was also born in Lancashire, and probably attended St Mary Hall, Oxford. Anderton and Marsden were friends from early youth and attended Oxford together, although at different colleges. The two travelled to Douai, where they converted to Roman Catholicism. They entered the English College at Reims in 1580. The two were ordained to the priesthood there, and made prefects over the junior school.

== Mission, capture, and execution ==
Upon finishing their studies, Anderton and Marsden set out for England on 4 February 1586. They were caught in a storm while crossing the English Channel and prayed to die on land rather than at sea. Their ship being driven ashore by the storm onto the Isle of Wight, they were quickly seized by the local authorities. In court, they pleaded that they had not violated the law by landing in England, as their landing was involuntary, being forced ashore by the storm.

Blessed William Marsden
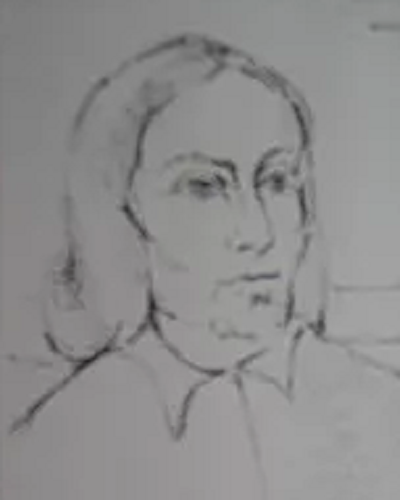

Priest and Martyr
- Born: c. 1560; Lancashire
- Died: 25 April 1586 (aged 25 - 26); Isle of Wight
- Honored in: Roman Catholic Church
- Beatified: 15 December 1929 by Pope Pius XI
- Feast: 25 April (together with his companion); 29 October (one of the Douai Martyrs)

This led to their being summoned to London, where they were given the opportunity to take the Oath of Supremacy, acknowledging Elizabeth as the Supreme Governor of the Church of England. Although they acknowledged Elizabeth as their lawful queen in all secular affairs, they would not swear the Oath. As failure to take the oath was considered treason under the Second Act of Supremacy, Anderton and Marsden were found guilty of treason. The sentence was then confirmed, and a proclamation was published, explaining their guilt. They were taken back to the Isle of Wight near the spot where they had landed and executed by hanging, drawing, and quartering on 25 April 1586.

The actual spot has not been identified. Some say it is at Mark's Corner on the edge of Parkhurst Forest, others that it could be in Gurnard above the sailing club. Wherever it was, it overlooked Cowes Roads, where they first sought shelter from the storm.

== Legacy ==
They were beatified by Pope Pius XI in 1929.

There is a stained glass window of Blessed Robert Anderton in St Mary's Catholic Church in Euxton.

A memorial plaque was erected in their honor in the garden at St Thomas of Canterbury Roman Catholic Church in Cowes.

== See also ==
- Douai Martyrs
