= Charles Alfred Anderson =

American geologist (1902–1990)

Charles Alfred "Andy" Anderson (June 6, 1902 – January 9, 1990) was an American geologist and petrographer whose research focused on ore deposits, volcanic geology, and Precambrian terranes. He served as chief geologist of the United States Geological Survey (USGS) from 1959 to 1964.

== Early life and education ==
Anderson was born in Bloomington, California. He graduated from Pomona College in 1924 with a degree in geology and received his Ph.D. from the University of California, Berkeley in 1928. His doctoral work examined copper deposits in Plumas County, California.

== Academic career ==
Following completion of his doctorate, Anderson joined the faculty of the University of California, Berkeley, where he taught for fourteen years and attained the rank of associate professor by 1942. His early research concentrated on volcanic rocks of northern California, including studies of the Tuscan Formation, Glass Mountain, Lassen Volcanic National Park, and related volcanic breccias.

== United States Geological Survey ==
In 1942, during World War II, Anderson joined the USGS Strategic Minerals Program. His early assignments included studies of molybdenum deposits and detailed investigations of the porphyry copper deposit at Bagdad, Arizona. He later conducted extensive research on the massive sulfide deposits at Jerome, Arizona, contributing to broader syntheses of the Precambrian geology of central Arizona.

In 1952 he became assistant chief of the USGS Mineral Deposits Branch and in 1953 was appointed chief of that branch. In 1959 he was appointed chief geologist of the Survey’s Geologic Division, serving until 1964. During his tenure he supported the development of isotope geology, marine geology, and lunar research programs within the Survey.

After completing his term as chief geologist, Anderson returned to field research in Arizona and later worked in Menlo Park, California. He retired from the USGS in 1972.

== Honors and legacy ==
Anderson was elected to the American Academy of Arts and Sciences in 1956 and to the National Academy of Sciences in 1957. He served as vice president (1959) and president (1968) of the Society of Economic Geologists and was awarded its Penrose Medal in 1974. Pomona College awarded him an honorary doctorate in 1960.

The uranium carbonate mineral andersonite, first identified at Jerome, Arizona, was named in his honor in recognition of his contributions to mineral resource geology.

Anderson died on January 9, 1990, in Pomona, California, of Alzheimer’s disease.
