= Anderton baronets =

Extinct baronetcy in the Baronetage of England

- Escutcheon of the Anderton baronets of Lostock
- Creation date: 1677
- Status: extinct
- Extinction date: 1760
- Arms: Sable, three shacklocks argent

The Anderton Baronetcy, of Lostock in the County of Lancaster, was a title in the Baronetage of England. It was created on 8 October 1677 for Francis Anderton of Lostock Hall in the parish of Bolton le Moors, Lancashire. The Andertons of Lostock were descended from the ancient family of Euxton Hall, near Chorley, Lancashire. They acquired Lostock by marriage in the 13th century. They were a devout Roman Catholic family and their estate was lost by sequestration in 1615 due to recusancy but was restored after the English Reformation to Francis Anderton the first Baronet. The third, fourth, fifth and sixth Baronets were brothers. On the death of the third Baronet, his heir, his brother Lawrence, a Benedictine monk succeeded to the Baronetcy but relinquished his claim to the Lostock estate. However his younger brother Francis, a Jacobite, was convicted of High Treason for his part in the Battle of Preston (1715) and the estate was again lost by sequestration. Lawrence returned from France, renounced his Catholicism and successfully reclaimed the estate. Francis was pardoned and on his death succeeded to the Baronetcy but he did not recover the estate which passed to his sister and her husband. The Baronetcy became extinct on the death of Sir Francis in 1760.

== Anderton baronets, of Lostock (1677) ==
- Sir Francis Anderton, 1st Baronet (c. 1628–1678)
- Sir Charles Anderton, 2nd Baronet (1657–1691)
- Sir Charles Anderton, 3rd Baronet (1677–1705)
- Sir James Anderton, 4th Baronet (1678–1710)
- Sir Laurence Anderton, 5th Baronet (c. 1680–1724)
- Sir Francis Anderton, 6th Baronet (1680–1760)

== See also ==
- Anderton family
- Lostock
- Lostock Hall Gatehouse
