= Diocese of the Bahamas and the Turks and Caicos Islands =

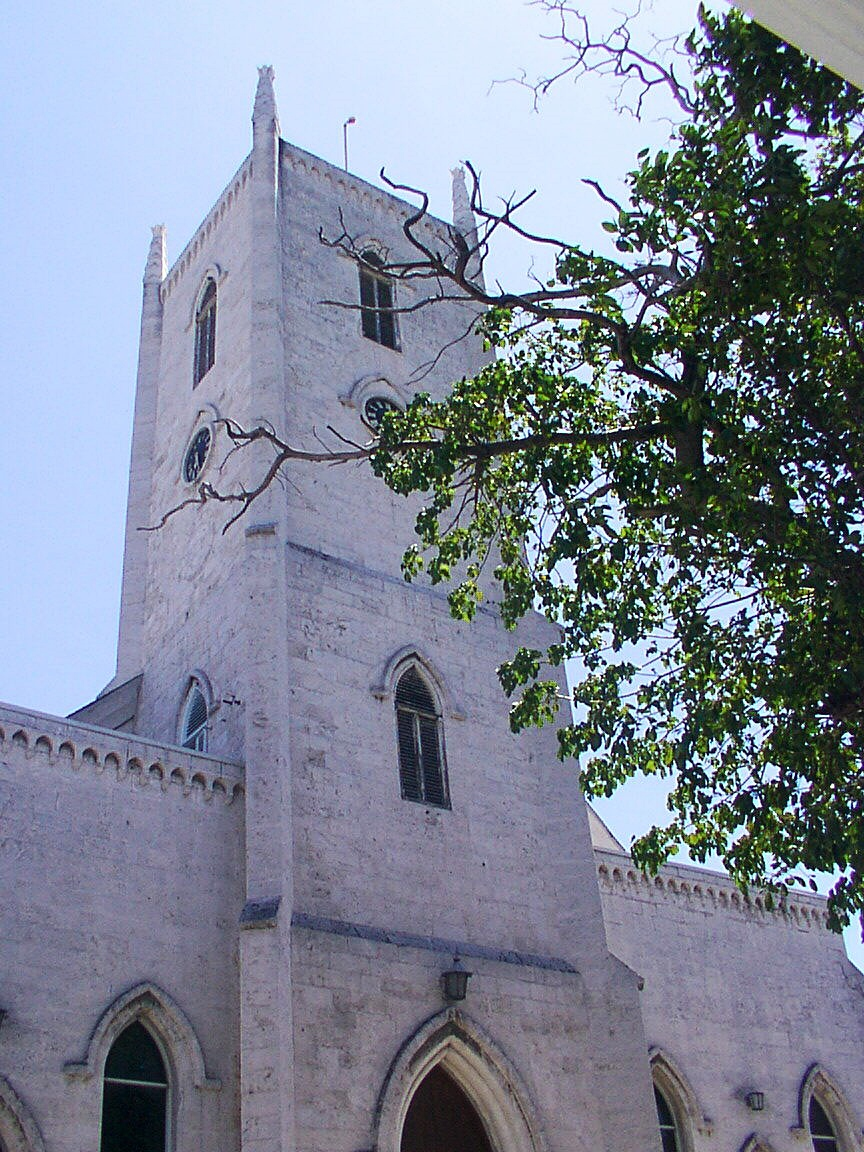
Christ Church Cathedral, Nassau, Bahamas

The Anglican Diocese of the Bahamas and the Turks and Caicos Islands was originally established in 1861 as the Diocese of Nassau. Retitled the Diocese of Nassau and the Bahamas in 1942, it is now known as the Diocese of the Bahamas and the Turks and Caicos Islands. It is a diocese of the Church in the Province of the West Indies, a constituent province of the Anglican Communion.

The diocese founded the Anglican Central Education Authority.

== History ==
When the Bahamas was granted to the Lords Proprietors of Carolina by the English Crown in 1670 one of the conditions was the establishment of the Anglican church on the islands. The first Christ Church was built in Nassau between 1670 and 1684 to act as the Parish church of the colony. This wooden structure and its successor were destroyed by the Spanish and a third wooden building was demolished to make way in 1754 for a stone built structure. This, in turn, was enlarged to become the present building in 1841.

In 1729, with the arrival of Woodes Rogers the first Royal Governor, the Bahamian church was established by law and came under the episcopal jurisdiction of the Bishop of London. In 1768, a second parish of St John's was created to serve Harbour Island and Eleuthera. When the Diocese of Jamaica was created in 1824, the Bahamas and Turks and Caicos Islands were incorporated into that diocese, becoming, in 1844, a separate Archdeaconry.

On 4 November 1861, the Bahamas and the Turks and Caicos Islands became a diocese in its own right as the Diocese of Nassau. The township of Nassau was proclaimed a city and Christ Church was made the diocesan cathedral. The Anglican church was disestablished in 1869.

In 1999, Angela Palacious was ordained as the first woman deacon in the Anglican Diocese of Nassau's 138-year history and the following year, she became the first Bahamian woman to be ordained as an Anglican priest.

== Bishops of the Bahamas ==
Arms of the Bishops of the Bahamas and the Turks and Caicos Islands

- 1861–1862 Charles Caulfield
- 1864–1876 Addington Robert Peel Venables
- 1878–1885 Francis A.R.C. Cramer Roberts
- 1886–1900 Edward Churton
- 1902–1904 Henry Norris Churton
- 1904–1918 Wilfrid Bird Hornby
- 1919–1931 Roscow Shedden
- 1932–1942 John Dauglish
- 1942–1962 Spence Burton, S.S.J.E.
- 1962–1970 Bernard Markham
- 1971–1996 Michael H. Eldon
- 1997–2009 Drexel W. Gomez
- 2009–present Laish Boyd

== Bibliography ==
- Dupuch, Etienne Jr., ed. (2000). Bahamas Handbook. E. Dupuch, Jr., Publications.
- Hanna-Ewers, Deanne (2013). Great Women in Bahamian History: Bahamian Women Pioneers. Bloomington, Indiana: AuthorHouse. ISBN 978-1-4520-5398-1.
