= Churton (surname) =

Churton is a surname. Notable people with the surname include:

- Edward Churton (1800–1874), English clergyman and scholar
- Edward Churton (bishop) (1841–1912), bishop of Nassau
- Henry Churton (1843–1904), bishop of Nassau
- Maud Churton Braby, born Maud Churton (1876–1932), English author born in China
- Ralph Churton (1764–1831), English clergyman, academic and biographer
- Theodore Churton (1853–1915), English clergyman
- Tobias Churton, British scholar
- William Churton (died 1767), American surveyor
- William Ralph Churton (1837–1897), English clergyman
