= Library of Anglo-Catholic Theology =

The Library of Anglo-Catholic Theology (published by John Henry Parker) was a series of 19th-century editions of theological works by writers belonging to the Church of England. Devoted, as the title suggests, to significant Anglo-Catholic figures, it brought back into print a number of works from the 17th century and concentrated, though not exclusively, on the Caroline Divines. The publication of the Library, from 1841, was connected with the Oxford Movement which had begun in 1833; some of the editors, such as William John Copeland and Charles Crawley, were clearly identified with the movement. However, the interests of the Library diverged early from those of the Tractarians. A total of 95 volumes by 20 writers were published over a dozen years; the original plan had been to include 53 authors. The Library of Anglo-Catholic Theology was founded in response to the publications of the Parker Society.

== Authors ==
- Lancelot Andrewes (1555–1626), 11 volumes, edited by J.P. Wilson and James Bliss
- William Beveridge (1637-1708), 12 volumes, edited by James Bliss
- John Bramhall, 5 volumes, edited by Arthur West Haddan
- George Bull, 7 volumes
- John Cosin (1594–1672), 5 volumes
- Richard Crakanthorp, edited by Christopher Wordsworth
- William Forbes
- Mark Frank, 2 volumes
- Peter Gunning, edited by Charles Page Eden
- Henry Hammond edited by Nicholas Pocock
- George Hickes
- John Johnson (1662–1726), editor John Baron
- William Laud (1573–1645) edited by William Scott and James Bliss
- Hamon L'Estrange
- Nathaniel Marshall
- William Nicholson
- John Overall (1559–1619)
- John Pearson (1613–1686), edited by Edward Churton (minor works)
- Herbert Thorndike, 6 volumes, edited by Arthur West Haddan
- Thomas Wilson (1663–1755) edited by John Keble

== Committee ==
The committee members for the Library project were the following (serving 1840 to 1845 unless otherwise marked):

- R. S. Barton
- Edward Churton
- William John Copeland (1844–5)
- John Goulter Dowling (1840–1)
- William Gresley
- Walter Farquhar Hook
- Richard William Jelf
- John Keble
- Samuel Roffey Maitland (1840)
- Henry Edward Manning (1845)
- William Hodge Mill
- George Moberly
- John Henry Newman
- Henry Handley Norris (1840–3)
- William Palmer
- Arthur Philip Perceval (1840–4)
- Edward Bouverie Pusey
- Robert Isaac Wilberforce (1845)
- Christopher Wordsworth (1845)

== See also ==
- Library of the Fathers
