= Bishop Michael Eldon School =

Private school in the Bahamas

BMES crest

Bishop Michael Eldon School is a private school in Freeport, the Bahamas, run by the Anglican Central Education Authority. The school was formed by the consolidation of other schools including Freeport High School founded in 1965 and Discovery Primary School founded in 1988.

== History ==
The private school, Freeport High School, opened its doors on Monday, 3 September 1965. The faculty consisted of Mr. Maurice Lord, the former headmaster of the Freeport School, an all-age school administered by the Grand Bahama Port Authority, three other members of the staff of that school, and seven new teachers.

In 1975, the school was taken over by the Anglican Central Education Authority based in Nassau, and Father Bishop who had been Headmaster at St. John's College, Nassau, for many years, was appointed Principal. He held the post for three years, retiring in 1978 when Mrs. Anita Osman was appointed and held the post until 1986. Mr. Ernest Rocheford, a Bajan, and former Principal of the Saint Marten Academy served as Principal from January 1987 to June 1989.

Discovery Primary School was established by Lady Henrietta St. George in January 1988. The School was located in a cottage at the bottom of Lady Henrietta's Freeport home. The school began with twelve students and three teachers.

In September 2005, the combined Freeport Anglican High School and Discovery Primary School was changed to the Bishop Michael Eldon School. The school is named for Bishop Michael Eldon, the first Bahamian-born Bishop of Nassau.

In June 2008 Vice-Principal, Anita Doherty, was named Principal Designate. In August 2008, Mrs. Doherty assumed her new post as Principal of Bishop Michael Eldon School. Doherty retired in 2017.

== Notable alumni ==
- Iram Lewis Olympian sprinter and Politician
- Donald Thomas - high jump world champion and Olympian
- Jeffery Gibson - 400m Hurdle world champ medalist & Olympian
- Joanna Evans - Bahamas national swim champion, Olympian and top ten college swimmer
- Henry Rolle Professional Track and Field coach
