= Massingberd =

Massingberd is a surname. Notable people with the surname include:

- Emily Langton Massingberd (1847–1897), English women's rights campaigner and temperance activist
- Francis Charles Massingberd (1800–1872), English churchman, writer, chancellor of Lincoln diocese
- Hugh Massingberd (1946–2007), English journalist and genealogist
- Sir William Massingberd, 3rd Baronet (1677–1723), English political figure

== See also ==
- Massingberd baronets, a title in the Baronetage of England
- Archibald Montgomery-Massingberd (1871–1947), British field marshal and Chief of the Imperial General Staff
