= Charles Eden =

Charles Eden may refer to:

- Charles Eden (politician) (1673–1722), second Governor of the separate Colony of North Carolina
- Charles Eden (Royal Navy officer) (1808–1878)
- Charles Page Eden (1807–1885), English clerical author and editor
