= Diocese of Nassau =

The Diocese of Nassau may refer to:

- Anglican Diocese of Nassau
- Roman Catholic Diocese of Nassau
