= Spence Burton =

American Anglican bishop

The Right Reverend Spence Burton SSJE
- Bishop of Nassau and The Bahamas
- Church: Church of England
- Diocese: Nassau and The Bahamas
- Elected: 1942
- In office: 1942–1962
- Predecessor: John Dauglish
- Successor: Bernard Markham
- Previous post: Suffragan Bishop of Haiti (1939–1942)

Orders
- Ordination: 1908 by Reginald Heber Weller
- Consecration: May 3, 1939 by Henry St. George Tucker

Personal details
- Born: October 4, 1881 Cincinnati, Ohio, United States
- Died: February 15, 1966 (aged 84) Cincinnati, Ohio, United States
- Buried: Spring Grove Cemetery
- Denomination: Anglican
- Parents: Caspar Henry Burton (1859-1931) & Byrd Spence (1862-1922)

Spence Burton SSJE (4 October 1881 – 15 February 1966) was an Anglican bishop in the mid 20th century and the first American to be consecrated a bishop in the Church of England.

== Biography ==
Born on 4 October 1881 in Cincinnati, Ohio, the son of Caspar H. Burton and Byrd Waithman. He was educated at Harvard University graduating with a Bachelor of Arts in 1903 and a Master of Arts in 1904. He was a reporter with the New York Daily News from 1903 until 1904. He then attended the General Theological Seminary from where he earned a Bachelor of Divinity in 1907 and awarded a Doctor of Sacred Theology in 1939. He was ordained deacon in 1907 by the Bishop of New Hampshire Edward M. Parker, and priest in 1908 by the Coadjutor Bishop of Fond du Lac Reginald Heber Weller. After a short spell as an assistant priest at St John the Evangelist, Boston between 1907 and 1908, he was to spend the next 30 years with the Society of St. John the Evangelist. He was initially curate at the Church of St John the Evangelist in Oxford, and after a period as a novice was then professed as a religious in 1912. In 1916 he returned to the United States and became master of the novices of the American Congregation, while in 1922 he eventually become Father Superior of the same congregation. He was also rector of the Church of the Advent of Christ the King in San Francisco and chaplain at the San Quentin State Prison from 1922 until 1924.

== Episcopacy ==
On November 3, 1938, he was elected Suffragan Bishop of Haiti and the Dominican Republic and consecrated on May 3, 1939 at Trinity Church Boston by Presiding Bishop Henry St. George Tucker. Three years later, he was translated to Nassau, and enthroned on November 1, 1942 in Christ Church Cathedral, Nassau, Bahamas. He finally resigned in 1962. He died on 15 February 1966. A college he founded during his episcopate recently celebrated its 60th anniversary.

He was a bishop associate of the Confraternity of the Blessed Sacrament.

== Notes ==
Religious titles
Preceded by John Dauglish	Bishop of Nassau; 1942–1962	Succeeded by Bernard Markham
