= Bishop of Nassau =

The Bishop of Nassau may refer to:

- Anglican Bishop of Nassau
- Roman Catholic Bishop of Nassau
