= Francis Charles Massingberd =

English priest

Francis Charles Massingberd (3 December 1800 – 5 December 1872) was an English churchman and writer, chancellor of the diocese of Lincoln, England.

== Life ==
The son of Francis Massingberd, rector of Washingborough, near Lincoln, and Elizabeth, his wife, youngest daughter of William Burrell Massingberd of Ormsby Hall, he was born at his father's rectory, 3 December 1800, and baptised 30 December. After preparatory education at a school at Eltham, Kent, he entered Rugby School under Dr. John Wooll in 1814. He matriculated at Magdalen College, Oxford, and was elected a demy, 23 July 1818. He gained a second class in literæ humaniores, and graduated B.A. 5 December 1822, M.A. 26 June 1825.

He was ordained deacon by Edward Legge, bishop of Oxford, 13 June 1824, and priest by George Pretyman Tomline, bishop of Lincoln, 5 September 1825, and was instituted to the family living of South Ormsby, Lincolnshire, on 9 December of that year. The previous summer, together with his friend William Ralph Churton, he had accompanied Thomas Arnold in a visit to Italy to determine the line of Hannibal's passage over the Alps, and to explore the battlefields of his campaign, for the purposes of Arnold's Roman History. When settled at Ormsby he rebuilt Driby church and restored that at Ormsby, erected a new rectory on a new site, and built schools, which he had originally started in a kitchen.

In 1841 he visited Italy, and spent two winters in Rome on account of his health. He was back at Ormsby in 1844. In 1846 he declined an offer from Henry Phillpotts, bishop of Exeter to exchange into that diocese with the prospect of appointment to the first vacant archdeaconry. He was collated to the prebendal stall of Thorngate in Lincoln Cathedral by Bishop Kaye, 15 May 1847, and was made chancellor and canon residentiary by Bishop Jackson, 11 December 1862.

In 1833 he published ‘Reasons for a Session of Convocation,’ and when that object was attained he was one of its most active members, first as proctor for the parochial clergy in 1857, and subsequently, in 1868, for the chapter. He frequently sat on committees and drew up their reports, and took a large share in the debates. As chancellor of Lincoln he directed his efforts to the efficiency of the cathedral. Together with other minor reforms, he was the first to institute an afternoon nave sermon, and during successive Lents he delivered courses of lectures on the prayer-book and on church history.

He died in London of congestion of the lungs on 5 December 1872, and was buried at South Ormsby.

== Works ==
In 1840, at the request of his friend Edward Churton, he undertook the English History of the leaders of the Reformation, in the Englishman's Library, of which Churton was the editor. It was published in 1842, and reached a fourth edition in 1866. Written from a distinctly high-church point of view, it gave a clear narrative of the events of the period, and is free from sectarian bitterness.

Besides many occasional sermons, pamphlets, letters, and printed speeches on ecclesiastical subjects, of which a catalogue is given in Bloxam's Magdalen College Register (vii. 273), his other chief literary works were:

- ‘The Educational and Missionary Work of the Church in the Eighteenth Century,’ 1857.
- ‘The Law of the Church and the Law of the State,’ 1859.
- ‘Lectures on the Prayer Book,’ 1864.
- ‘Sermons on Unity, with an Essay on Religious Societies,’ 1868.

== Family ==
On 15 January 1839 he married at Putney Church Fanny, eldest daughter of William Baring, M.P., and granddaughter of Sir Francis Baring. He left two sons: Francis Burrell, captain 5th lancers; and William Oswald, at one time rector of Ormsby.
