= Churton =

Churton may refer to:

== People ==
- Churton (surname)

== Places ==
- Churton, Cheshire, a village in England
  - Churton by Aldford, a parish containing part of the village
  - Churton by Farndon, a parish containing part of the village
  - Churton Heath, another parish in the area

== See also ==
- Churton Hall
- Chirton
