= Anglican Central Education Authority =

Bahamian Christian education organization

The Anglican Central Education Authority (ACEA) is a Christian educational organization headquartered in Nassau, the Bahamas.

== History ==
The ACEA was founded by the Anglican Diocese of the Bahamas.

In 2013, the ACEA was sued by parents of 26 students of St. John's College for cancelling prom and the graduation ceremony. The ACEA had cancelled the prom for improper student behavior. The parents claimed that the ACEA had breached its contract. The ruling judge sided with the ACEA.

In response to Hurricane Milton, the ACEA closed St. Anne's School and St. John's College.

== Schools ==
The ACEA consists of four schools: Bishop Michael Eldon School is located on Grand Bahama, St. Andrew's Anglican School is on Exuma, and St. Anne's School and St. John's College are on New Providence.
