= Angela Palacious =

Bahamian Christian minister (born 1953)

- Born: Angela C. Bosfield; 1953 (age 72–73); Nassau, Bahamas
- Other name: Angela Bosfield Palacious
- Occupation: minister / theologian
- Known for: first Bahamian woman to serve as an Anglican deacon (1999) and priest (2000)

Angela Palacious (born 1953 in Nassau, Bahamas) is a Bahamian minister of religion and author.

She was the first woman deacon and the first woman priest of the Anglican Diocese of The Bahamas and the Turks and Caicos Islands.

== Early life and education ==
Palacious obtained a BA in English from Durham University, England in 1975 and an MA in English from Concordia University of Montreal, Quebec, Canada in 1978.

Palacious met her husband, James Palacious, while they were both students at Princeton University in 1981. In 1984, she obtained her Master of Divinity and the following year, she obtained a Master of Theology from Princeton Theological Seminary in New Jersey.

== Ordination ==
Palacious returned to the Bahamas and became an elementary school teacher. In 1992, the Anglican diocese agreed to allow women's ordination and the following year, Palacious applied to become a deacon.

She went to New York to further her training and, in 1994, she earned a Certificate in Anglican Studies from the General Theological Seminary in Manhattan.

On 11 May 1999, Palacious was ordained as the first woman deacon in the Anglican Diocese's 138-year history.

== Ministry ==
She and her husband, who at the time was rector of St. Matthew's Anglican Church, Nassau, became the first ordained husband and wife team in the region.

From 1999 to 2000, Palacious served as the Coordinator of the Diocese and, on 31 May 2000, Palacious was ordained as the first Bahamian woman Anglican priest of the Diocese of The Bahamas and the Turks and Caicos Islands.

Since her ordination, she has served as the assistant curate of St. Matthew's Church, and as the assistant Priest of St. Mary the Virgin Church and St. Margaret's Church.

== Writing career ==
Palacious is also the author of 8 books.

== Selected works ==
- Bosfield Palacious, Angela C (1998). A medley of meditations. Bahamas: (s.n.). ISBN 978-9-768-10829-6.
- Bosfield Palacious, Angela C (2000). Seasons of the Church: reflections from Advent to Harvest (1. ed.). Nassau, Bahamas: Media Publishing. ISBN 978-9-768-17031-6.
- Palacious, Angela (2000). Praying with and for children: from conception to adolescence. Nassau: Media Publishing. ISBN 978-9-768-17030-9.
- Palacious, Angela C. Bosfield (2002). Walking in the spirit : meditations on prayer, worship, ministry, and self-dedication. Nassau, Bahamas: Media Publishing. ISBN 978-9-768-17045-3.
- Palacious, Angela C. Bosfield (2003). Oasis in the Desert: volume 1. Nassau, Bahamas: Media Enterprises. ISBN 978-9-768-17061-3.
- Palacious, Angela C. Bosfield (2003). Allowing the scriptures to speak : reflections on the Word of God. Nassau, Bahamas: Angela Palacious Ministries. ISBN 978-9-769-51080-7.
- Palacious, Angela (2012). Christian Conch Salad. Nassau, Bahamas.
- Palacious, Angela (2014). Praying for Families: Reflections and Prayers. Nassau, Bahamas.

== Bibliography ==
- Dupuch, Etienne Jr., ed. (2000). Bahamas Handbook. E. Dupuch, Jr., Publications. ISBN 9780914755692.
- Hanna-Ewers, Deanne (2013). Great Women in Bahamian History: Bahamian Women Pioneers. Bloomington, Indiana: AuthorHouse. ISBN 978-1-4520-5398-1.
- McCartney, Donald M. (2004). Bahamian Culture and Factors which Impact Upon it: A Compilation of Two Essays. Pittsburgh, Pennsylvania: Dorrance Publishing Co., Inc. ISBN 978-0-8059-6325-0.
