= John Dauglish =

John Dauglish was an Anglican colonial bishop in the mid 20th century.

Born 19 October 1879 and educated at St Edward's School, Oxford and St John's College, Oxford he was ordained in 1902. After a short spell as a Curate he spent the next 19 years as a Royal Naval Chaplain. During the Great War, Dauglish served at Shotley Barracks where he was regarded as 'most zealous and conscientious 'and, from July, 1918, on HMS Queen Elizabeth on which he witnessed the surrender of the German High Seas Fleet and conducted the service of thanksgiving. He was a greatly admired padre, '...his upright character and straightforward advice and criticism universally appreciated'

In 1924 he was appointed Rector of Lympstone.In 1931 he was appointed Bishop of Nassau, resigning a decade later. In 1942, he became Secretary for the Society for the Propagation of the Gospel but had to resign after 2 years when 'he had bad heart failure following an operation' He died on 1 November 1952.

He was the only permanent RN Chaplain who served in the Great War to become a Diocesan bishop.

== Notes ==
Religious titles
| Preceded by Roscow George Shedden | Bishop of Nassau; 1932 –1942 | Succeeded by Spence Burton |
