= Anita Doherty =

Bahamian athlete and philanthropist (1949–2022)

Anita Louise Doherty (née deGregory; 25 January 1949 – 28 March 2022), was a Bahamian athlete, educator, and philanthropist, best known as a competitor in the pentathlon at the 1970 British Commonwealth Games as well as competing in tennis, field Hockey, netball, and softball.

She was born in Nassau, Bahamas, and grew up in West End, Grand Bahama, where she attended primary school. She attended the Hampton School (class of 1967) before matriculating into the Ulster College of Physical Education in Northern Ireland, Ulster, where she graduated.

== Honours ==
- Doherty was inducted into the Grand Bahama Sports Hall of Fame in 2005 and The Bahamas Hall of Fame in 2011.
- Anita Doherty Odd Distance Track and Field Meet and Anita Doherty Park are named in her honor on Grand Bahama Island.

== Career ==
Doherty was the former Vice Principal and Principal of Bishop Michael Eldon School after teaching there for 31 years in total.

== Death ==
In March 2022 Doherty was taken to the hospital after being found unresponsive, where she was later declared dead.
