= The Englishman's Library =

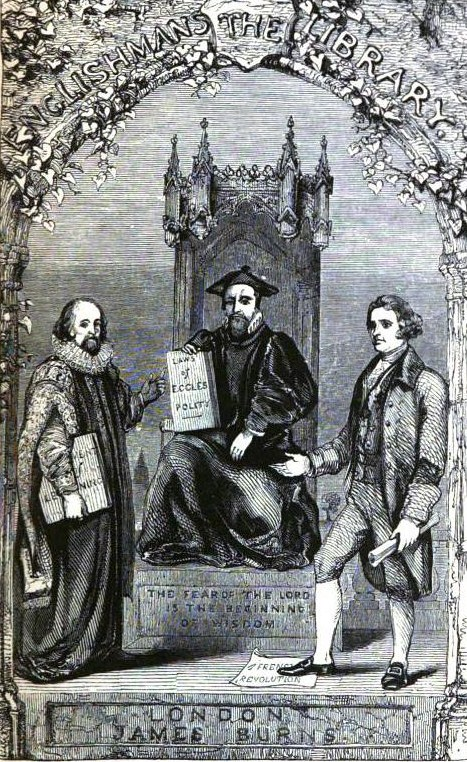
Frontispiece found in vol. 10 of the Library

The Englishman's Library was an English book series of the 1840s, a venture of the publisher James Burns. It ran eventually to 31 volumes.

The title had been used already in 1824, for The Englishman's library, edited by E. H. L., published by Charles Knight. The series was announced in ambitious fashion in the British Critic. It was started by William Gresley and Edward Churton, with propagandistic aims; the works are still a source for the "condition of England" debate of the time. Gresley wrote six novels for the series.

== Aims ==
According to its prospectus, the Library aimed to "unite a popular style with sound Christian principles". The announced authors did not in fact all contribute.

Those behind the series were younger High Church men who wished to imitate some of the success of the Tracts for the Times. They were less hostile to the Tractarians than older, more orthodox members of the Hackney Phalanx.

== List of volumes ==
Number	Date	Author	Title	Comment
1	1840	William Gresley	Clement Walton, or the English Citizen	novel
2		Henry Howard	Scripture History in Familiar Lectures (Old Testament)	
3	1839	Simon Patrick, edited by Thomas Chamberlain	The Parable of the Pilgrim	First published 1664. Chamberlain was of Christ Church, Oxford and St Thomas the Martyr's Church, Oxford.
4		Thomas Chamberlain	A Help to Knowledge	
5	1840	William Palmer	A Compendious Ecclesiastical History from the Earliest Period to the Present Time	Church history
6		Thomas Ken	The Practice of Divine Love	
7		Robert Anderson	The Lord's Prayer, a manual of religious knowledge	Anderson was perpetual curate of Trinity Chapel, Brighton
8	1840	Edward Churton	The Early English Church	
9		Francis Edward Paget	Tales of the Village vol. I	
10		William Sewell	Christian Morals	Based on Sewell's lectures as White's Professor of Moral Philosophy.
11		William Sherlock, Henry Melvill (editor)	Public Worship: a Practical Discourse of Religious Assemblies	Published in 1681 against dissenters; and again in 1700.
12		Robert Isaac Wilberforce	The Five Empires: a Compendium of Ancient History	
13	1840	William Gresley	The Siege of Lichfield, a Tale illustrative of the Great Rebellion	Novel
14	1840	Henry Howard	Scripture History. The New Testament	
15	1841	William Gresley	Charles Lever, or the Man of the Nineteenth Century	Novel
16		Francis Edward Paget	Tales of the Village vol. II	
17		Dorothy Pakington, William Pridden (editor)	The Art of Contentment	Devotional work. It was first published attributed to the author of The Whole Duty of Man; in the 1840s this author was still widely identified with Pakington. The 1864 suggestion of Francis Barham that the author was Richard Allestree is now the scholarly consensus. Pridden became vicar of West Stow.
18		Francis Edward Paget	Tales of the Village vol. III	
19	1841	William Gresley	The Forest of Arden, a Tale Illustrative of the English Reformation	Novel
20		Robert Isaac Wilberforce	Rutilius	Novel
21	1842	Francis Charles Massingberd	English History of the leaders of the Reformation	
22		William Henry Teale	Lives of Eminent English Laymen	Containing Lord Falkland, Izaak Walton, and Robert Nelson.
23		Thomas Chamberlain (editor)	Selected Letters	
24	1843	William Gresley	Church-Clavering, or The Schoolmaster	Novel, in which he developed ideas on education
25	1843	Henry Formby	A Visit to the East; comprising Germany and the Danube, Constantinople, Asia Minor, Egypt, and Idumea	
26	1843	William Pridden	Australia; Its History and Present Condition	
27	1844	Samuel Wilberforce	A History of the Protestant Episcopal Church in America	
28	1845	Samuel Fox	Monks and Monasteries: being an account of English monachism	
29	1845	Edward Wilson	The Martyr of Carthage	Novel
30	1845	William Gouan Todd	A History of the Ancient Church in Ireland	Todd was then curate of Kilkredy.
31	1846	William Gresley	Coniston Hall, or the Jacobites	Novel

== The Juvenile Englishman's Library ==
Paget as editor started a children's book collection, The Juvenile Englishman's Library, in 1844. It was inspired in part by the success of Edgar Taylor's English translations of Grimm's Fairy Tales. The series ran to 21 titles. Later John Fuller Russell was editor. Volume 4, Popular Tales (1844), had translation of fairy tales by Friedrich de la Motte Fouqué, Wilhelm Hauff and Karl Spindler. Four volumes were by John Mason Neale.
