= Burns & Oates =

- Parent company: Continuum
- Status: Defunct
- Founded: 1835
- Founder: James Burns
- Defunct: 1 July 2000
- Successor: Bloomsbury Academic
- Country of origin: United Kingdom
- Headquarters location: London
- Publication types: Books
- Nonfiction topics: Religion
- Imprints: Burns & Oates

Burns & Oates was a British Roman Catholic publishing house which most recently existed as an imprint of Continuum.

== Company history ==
It was founded by James Burns in 1835, originally as a bookseller. Burns was of Presbyterian background and he gained a reputation as a High Church publisher, producing works by the Tractarians.

In 1847 his business was put in jeopardy when he converted to Catholicism, but the firm was fortunate to receive the support of John Henry Newman, who chose the firm to publish many of his works. The clerics Thomas Edward Bridgett and Ambrose St. John claimed that Newman wrote his novel Loss and Gain specifically to assist Burns.

After a while trading as Burns, James Burns took a partner, renaming the company Burns & Lambert. In 1866 they were joined by a younger man, William Wilfred Oates, making the company Burns, Lambert & Oates and later Burns & Oates. Oates was another Catholic convert, and had previously co-founded the publishing house of Austin & Oates based in Bristol. Burns & Oates passed to his son Wilfred Oates, whose sister Mother Mary Salome became one of the firm’s most successful authors. The company was designated "Publishers to the Holy See" by Pope Leo XIII. For a number of decades a related firm published under the name Burns, Oates & Washbourne

In the United States the company's agent was The Catholic Publications Society of New York.

Burn & Oates became defunct on 1 July 2000, when Continuum acquired the company's publishing list for £100,000. Continuum were in turn bought out by Bloomsbury Publishing in July 2011.

== Book series ==
Certain series are jointly publisher by Herder and Herder, New York.

- The Bellarmine Series
- The Bible for Children
- The Calvert Series
- Cardinal Books
- Catholic Bibliographical Series
- The Catholic Girl in the World
- Catholic Scripture Manuals
- Clarion Books
- The Clifton Tracts
- Faith and Fact Books: Catholic Truth in the Scientific Age Series
- Golden Library
- The Granville Popular Library
- Granville Series
- Herder History of Dogma Series
- The History of the Primitive Church
- The Household of God Series
- Leisure Crafts Series
- Liberation and Theology
- Men of God
- Nature & Science Series for Children
- The New Library of Catholic Knowledge
- The Orchard Books
- Paternoster Series
- The Pilgrim's Sketch Books
- The Popes Through History
- Present Problems Series
- Quaestiones Disputatae
- Quarterly Series (joint publisher: Benzinger Bros., New York)
- The Saints
- Scripture Textbooks for Catholic Schools
- Treasury of the Faith Series
- True Wayside Tales
- Vision Books (joint publisher: Vision Books, New York)
