= Adam de Brome =

Almoner and founder of Oriel College, Oxford

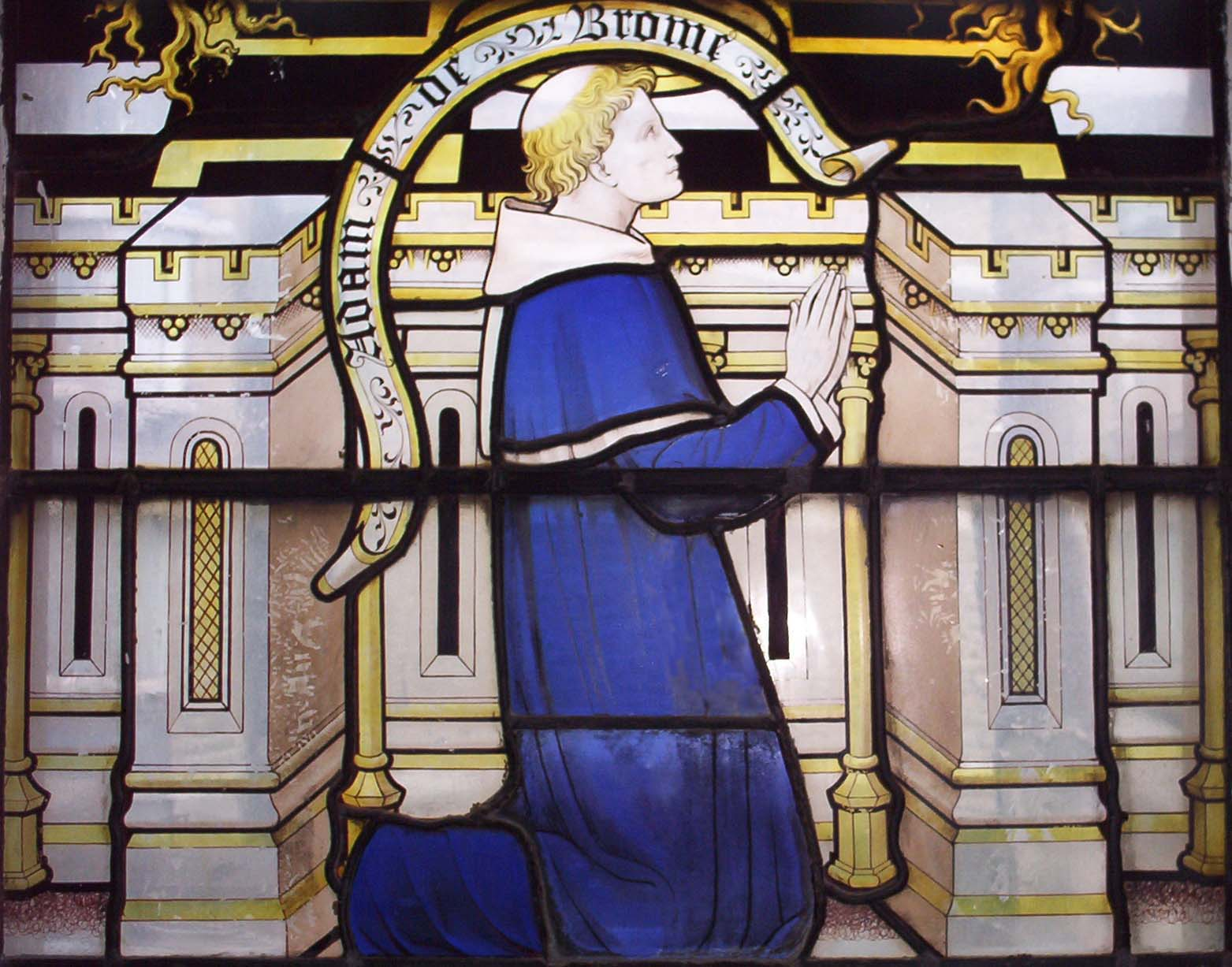
An image of Adam de Brome in a stained glass window in the hall of Oriel College, Oxford.

Adam de Brome (/də ˈbruːm/; died 16 June 1332) was an almoner to King Edward II and founder of Oriel College in Oxford, England. De Brome was probably the son of Thomas de Brome, taking his name from Brome near Eye in Suffolk; an inquisition held after the death of Edmund, 2nd Earl of Cornwall, in 1300, noted de Brome holding an inheritance of half a knight's fee.

== Secular career ==
The first records of de Brome are as a collector of food supplies in Dorset in 1297, in April 1298, he was in Ireland, from November 1299 was in charge of the assize of corn and wine and in the same year led troops from Yorkshire to Carlisle for a campaign in Scotland. In 1305 he was auditing accounts of the papal tithes, and in 1312 assessing tallage in the midlands. Early in Edward II's reign, de Brome was one of the King's Clerks of Chancery, he was twice ordered to take charge of the Bishop of Durham's seals until its vacancy was filled. After 1311 he was given a variety of judicial offices, as justice of assize, commissioner of oyer and terminer, and as a justice dealing with crimes against the wool customs.

== Ecclesiastical career ==
In the 14th century many royal officials were not directly paid, but instead were given the incomes of distant ecclesiastical properties that they rarely visited. De Brome may have been one of these, he had been ordained priest on 2 March 1301 and was admitted as rector of Wyck Rissington, Gloucestershire, three weeks later. He was appointed Master of God's House, Dunwich, in 1306, and was, for a short time, rector of Bridford, Devon between 1311 and 1312, Handsworth, Yorkshire between 1313 and 1316, and of St Creed, Cornwall in 1314. He also held the posts of chancellor of Durham sede vacante, in 1311 and between 1316 and 1317, archdeacon of Stow, in the diocese of Lincoln in 1320, prebendary of Bathwick in Wherwell Abbey, Hampshire from 1314 until 1320, rector of St Mary the Virgin, Oxford from 1320 until 1326, warden of St Bartholomew's Hospital, Oxford from 1326 until 1332, and rector sharing Eckington, Derbyshire from 1328 until 1332.

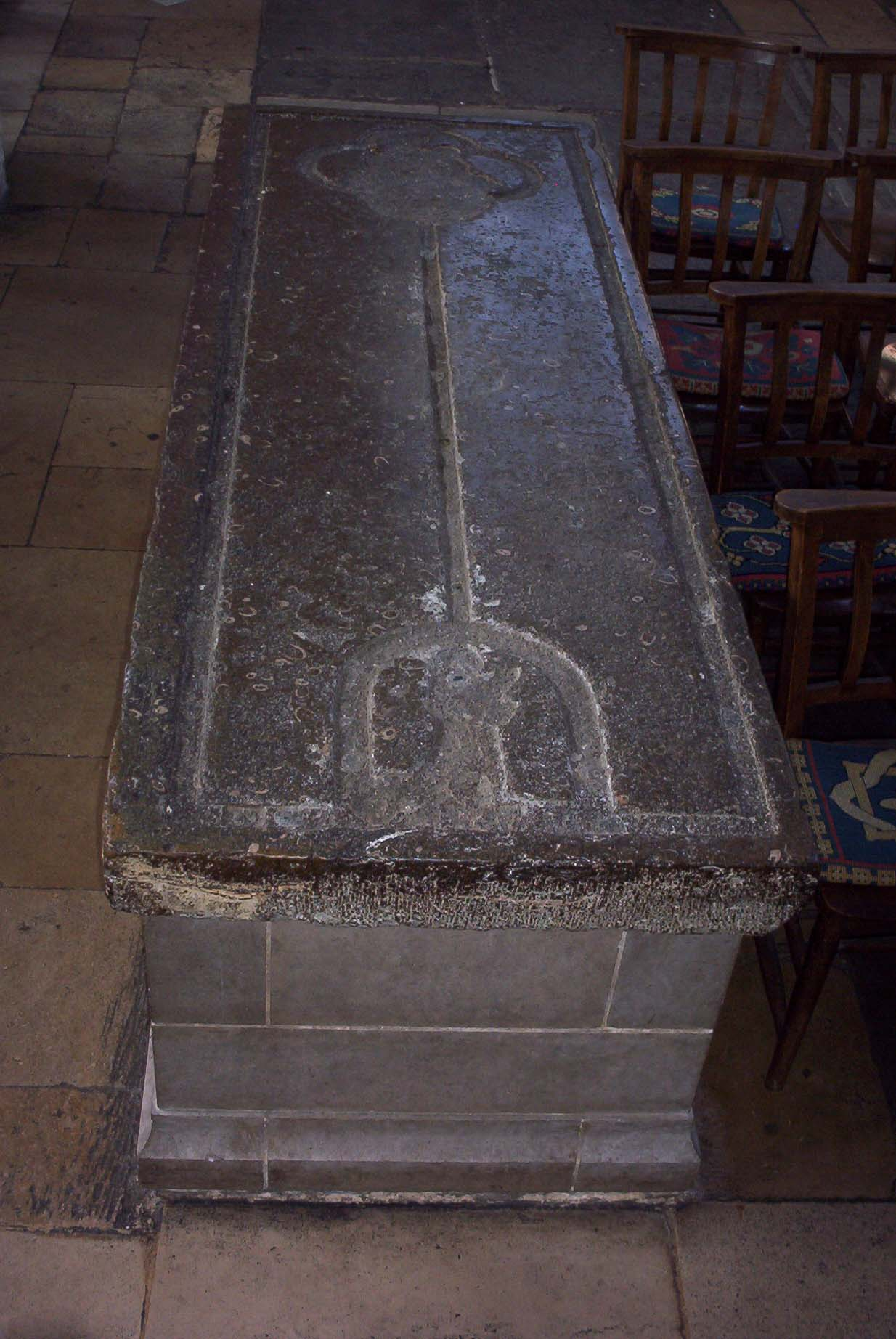
Adam de Brome's tomb in the St Mary the Virgin, the 14th century slab rests on a modern chest.

== Academic career ==
On 28 April 1324, letters patent were issued by the King giving de Brome licence to found a college of Scholars, allowing him to hold in mortmain a messuage worth £30 a year for the "students of divers sciences in the Virgin's honour", to be governed by a rector elected by the scholars, the details of the government to be settled by de Brome himself. Before the year was out, de Brome had purchased two tenements in Oxford, Tackley's Inn and Perilous Hall, the college, later called Oriel College, was declared to be for the study of theology and the ars dialectica and John de Laughton was appointed the first Rector.

On 1 January 1326, de Brome handed over the properties to the King, who, on 21 January, issued by letters patent a charter of foundation in his own name, the Rector was to be replaced with a Provost, de Brome was appointed the first Provost and the college re-endowed with Tackley's Inn and Perilous Hall. Statutes issued in the King's name by the Bishop of Lincoln, Henry Burghersh in May 1326 called for the provision of a common seal, to be kept in a box with three keys, one for the Provost and the other two to trusted Scholars, the seal depicts the Annunciation, with the figure of Adam de Brome kneeling below and the legend Sig.Comune Domus Scholarium Beate Marie Oxon. The statutes also stipulated daily services to be held in St Mary's for the souls of the father and mother of Burghersh, the Bishop himself, his brother and sisters, the King and de Brome. Burghersh confirmed the appropriation of St Mary's, and by 1 August 1326, de Brome had resigned its rectory into the hands of the college.

== Death ==
De Brome died in June 1332 and was buried on the north side of St Mary's Church, where, despite rebuilding, his tomb remains.
