= Roscow Shedden =

Roscow George Shedden (13 May 1882 – 11 December 1956) was an Anglican colonial bishop in the first half of the 20th century.

Born into the family of Sir George Shedden of Paulespury Park, at East Cowes, he was educated at Twyford School, Winchester College, and Brasenose College, Oxford,

Shedden was ordained into the ministry of the Church of England in 1907. His first posts were at St Peter's Leicester and All Saints, Margaret Street. He was ordained to the episcopate as Bishop of Nassau, a position he held until 1931. Returning to England he was Vicar of St Peter and St Paul's, Wantage from 1931 until his retirement in 1952. He was also an Assistant Bishop of Oxford from 1947 until his death on 11 December 1956.

Religious titles
Preceded by Wilfrid Hornby	Bishop of Nassau; 1919 –1931	Succeeded by John Dauglish
