= Bernard Markham =

Bernard Markham was an Anglican bishop in the 20th century.

Born on 26 February 1905 and educated at Bingley Grammar School and Leeds University, he was ordained in 1931. After curacies at Lidget Green and Stoke-on-Trent he held incumbencies at Bierley, North Kensington, Ardwick and St Margaret's, Toxteth, Liverpool (where he was Vicar from 1 September 1959 to July 1962). In 1962 he was appointed Bishop of Nassau, resigning a decade later. He was then an Assistant Bishop within the Anglican Diocese of Southwell until his death on 21 June 1984.

Religious titles
Preceded by Spence Burton	Bishop of Nassau; 1962 –1970	Succeeded by Michael Hartley Eldon
