= Edward Churton (bishop) =

Anglican bishop of Nassau

Edward Townson Churton (1841–1 May 1912) was an Anglican colonial bishop in the late 19th and early 20th centuries.

Born into an ecclesiastical family in 1841 and educated at Eton and Oriel College, Oxford he was ordained in 1866. He held incumbencies at St Nicholas, Ganton and St Bartholomew, Charlton next Dover before being ordained to the episcopate as Bishop of Nassau. Upon his resignation, he was succeeded by his younger brother Henry. He died on 1 May 1912.

== Notes ==
Religious titles
Preceded by Francis Cramer-Roberts	Bishop of Nassau; 1886 –1901	Succeeded by Henry Churton
