= John Marriott (poet) =

English poet and clergyman (1780–1825)

John Marriott (1780–1825) was an English poet and clergyman.

Marriott was born at Cotesbach in 1780, and educated at Rugby School and Christ Church, Oxford. He graduated in 1802 with a first-class degree in Classics. Between 1804 and 1808 he worked as a private tutor in the family of the Duke of Buccleuch at Dalkeith. He was ordained in 1805 and in 1807 Buccleuch installed Marriott as the rector of Church Lawford in Warwickshire. He retained the benefice until his death, although his wife's poor health meant that he lived in Devon, where he was curate in Exeter and at Broadclyst (he engaged a succession of curates for Church Lawford). He died at Broadclyst on 31 March 1825. He had four sons and a daughter; one of his sons, Charles Marriott, followed him into the clergy.

His published works include a volume of sermons which he issued in 1818, and a posthumous volume of sermons, published by his sons in 1838. His hymns were never published by himself, nor in book form by any one. His best known hymn is "Thou, whose almighty word", which is usually sung to the tune "Moscow" based on a melody by an Italian violinist, Felice de Giardini.

Marriott was a close friend of Sir Walter Scott who spoke of him in the second canto of Marmion as someone with whom he could talk about poetry.
