= University Church of St Mary the Virgin =

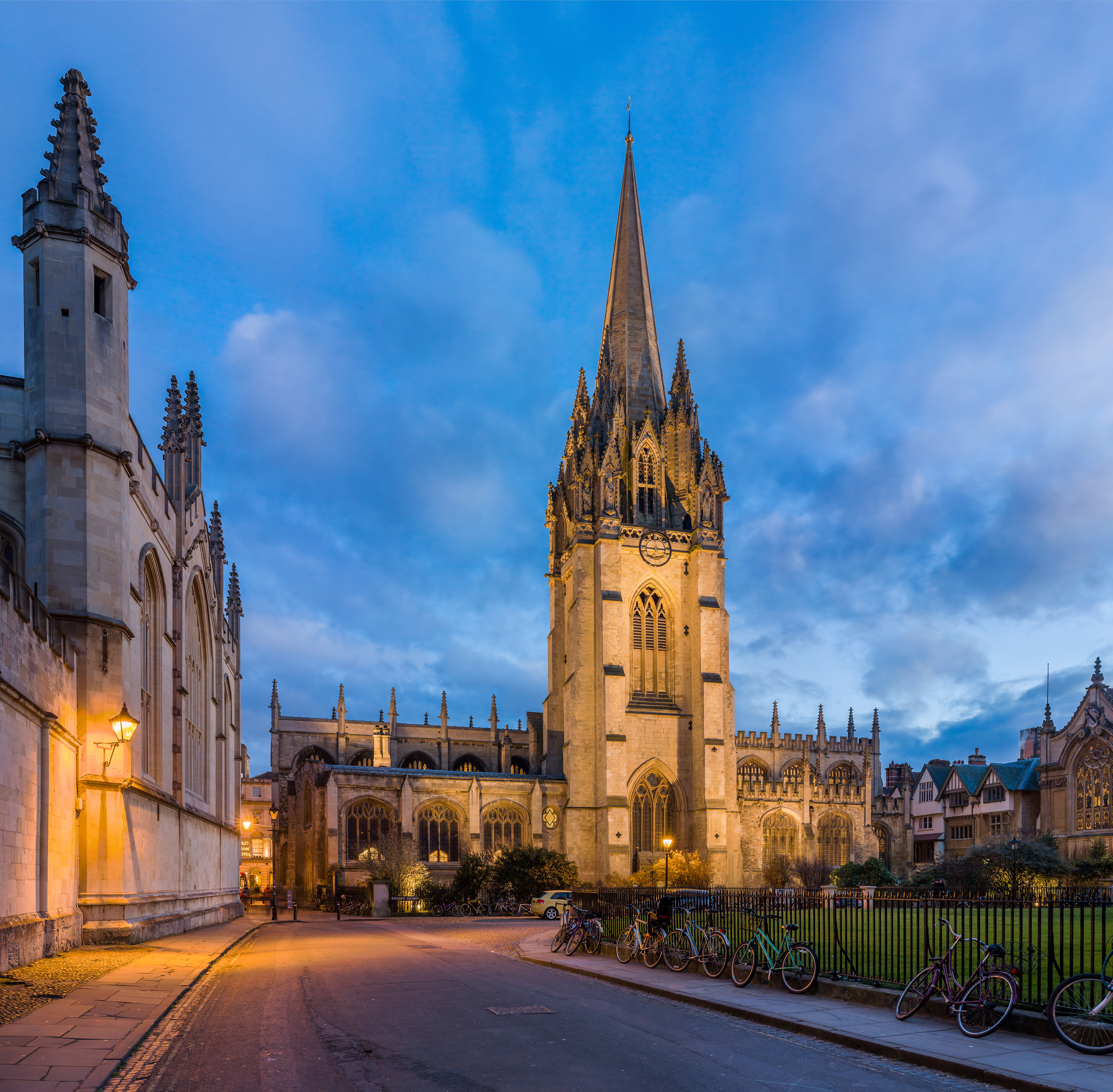
- Church from Radcliffe Square

- Location within Oxfordshire
- 51°45′10″N 1°15′13.45″W
- OS grid reference: SP 51610 06274
- Location: Oxford
- Country: England
- Denomination: Church of England
- Churchmanship: High Church / Liberal Catholic
- Website: universitychurch.ox.ac.uk

History
- Status: Parish church
- Founded: c.1490; 536 years ago
- Dedication: Blessed Virgin Mary
- Consecrated: About 1500
- Events: Site of the 1555 trial of the Oxford Martyrs

Architecture
- Functional status: Active
- Heritage designation: Grade I listed
- Designated: 12 January 1954
- Style: English Gothic

Administration
- Province: Canterbury
- Diocese: Oxford
- Parish: Oxford

Clergy
- Vicar: William Lamb

The University Church of St Mary the Virgin (St Mary's or SMV for short) is an Anglican church in Oxford situated on the north side of the High Street. It is the centre from which the University of Oxford grew and its parish consists almost exclusively of university and college buildings.

== Overview ==
St Mary's possesses an eccentric Baroque porch, designed by Nicholas Stone, facing High Street, and a spire which is claimed by some church historians to be one of the most beautiful in England. Radcliffe Square lies to the north, to the east is the southern end of Catte Street and to the west is St Mary's Passage, leading into Radcliffe Square. The 13th-century tower is open to the public for a fee and provides good views across the heart of the historic university city, especially Radcliffe Square, the Radcliffe Camera, Brasenose College, Oxford and All Souls College.

== History ==
A church was established on this site, at the centre of the old walled city, in Anglo-Saxon times; records of 1086 note the church as previously belonging to an estate held by Aubrey de Coucy, likely Iffley, and the parish including part of Littlemore.

In the early days of Oxford University, the church was adopted as the first building of the university, congregation met there from at least 1252, and by the early 13th century it was the seat of university government and was used for lectures and the award of degrees. Around 1320 a two-storey building was added to the north side of the chancel – the ground floor became the "convocation" house used by university parliament, and the upper storey housed books bequeathed by Thomas Cobham, Bishop of Worcester, which formed the first university library.

When Adam de Brome became rector in 1320 the church's fortune became linked to what would later become Oriel College. In 1324 Brome founded St Mary Hall and appropriated the church's rectory house, including small tithes, oblations and burial dues for the college, an act confirmed in 1326 by the bishop, Henry Burghersh, after Brome had got Edward II's patronage to refound the college. Brome diverted the revenues of the church to his college, which thereafter was responsible for appointing the vicar and providing four chaplains to celebrate the daily services in the church. Early provosts of the college were inducted into their stall in the church, and until 1642 fellows were required to attend services on Sundays and holy days.

St Mary's was the site of the 1555 trial of the Oxford Martyrs, when the bishops Latimer and Ridley and Archbishop Cranmer were tried for heresy. The martyrs were imprisoned at the former Bocardo Prison near St Michael at the Northgate in Cornmarket Street and subsequently burnt at the stake just outside the city walls to the north. A cross set into the road marks that location on what is now Broad Street; the nearby Martyrs' Memorial, at the south end of St Giles' Street, commemorates the events.

A section cut out of "Cranmer's Pillar" remains from the morning of Cranmer's death on 21 March 1556 when he was brought to the church for a sermon from Henry Cole, Provost of Eton College, who on Mary I's instructions, spelt out the reasons why he must die. Cranmer stood on a stage, the corner of which was supported by a small shelf cut from the pillar opposite the pulpit; withdrawing his recantations of his Reformed beliefs, he swore that when he was burnt, the hand which had signed them would be the first to burn.

Until the 17th century, the church was used not only for prayers but also for increasingly rowdy graduation and degree ceremonies. This phenomenon, "The notion that 'sacrifice is made equally to God and Apollo', in the same place where homage was due to God and God alone", was repugnant to William Laud, Archbishop of Canterbury, who in the 1630s initiated the erecting of a separate building for these ceremonies. This project was cut short by the fall of Laud and the outbreak of the English Civil War, but after the Restoration, it was revived and carried through by John Fell, Dean of Christ Church, who commissioned Christopher Wren to erect what became the Sheldonian Theatre. Thereafter, the church was reserved for religious worship only.

During his time in Oxford, John Wesley often attended the university sermon, and later, as a fellow of Lincoln College, preached sermons in the church including the university sermon on "Salvation by Faith" on 18 June 1738 and the "Almost Christian" sermon on 25 July 1741. Following his denunciation of the spiritual apathy and sloth of the senior members of the university in his sermon "Scriptural Christianity" on 24 August 1744, he was never asked to preach there again — "I preached, I suppose, the last time at St Mary's", he wrote in his journal, "Be it so; I have fully delivered my soul."

In 1828, John Henry Newman became vicar and his sermons became popular with undergraduates. From the present pulpit John Keble preached the assize sermon of 14 July 1833, which is traditionally considered to have started the Oxford Movement, an attempt to revive catholic spirituality in the church and university. The influence of the movement spread and affected the practice and spirituality of the Church of England. By 1843, Newman became disillusioned with Anglicanism and resigned from St Mary's, later joining the Roman Catholic Church.

From 2003 to November 2025, the Vaults & Garden Café operated within the church premises. It was closed after a two year court case that began when the Parochial Church Council of the University Church of St Mary the Virgin sent the cafe owners an eviction notice.

== Architecture ==
In the later 15th and early 16th century, the main body of the church was substantially rebuilt in the Perpendicular style, but the oldest part of the present church is the tower, which dates from around 1270. The Decorated spire with its triple-gabled outer pinnacles, inner pinnacles, gargoyles and statues was added in the 1320s. Only one of the twelve statues is original, the others were by George Frampton and erected around 1894. The original statues can now be found in the cloister of New College. The tower is plainer, having long three light bell openings with intersecting tracery. The architect is unknown, though the master mason in 1275 was Richard of Abingdon.

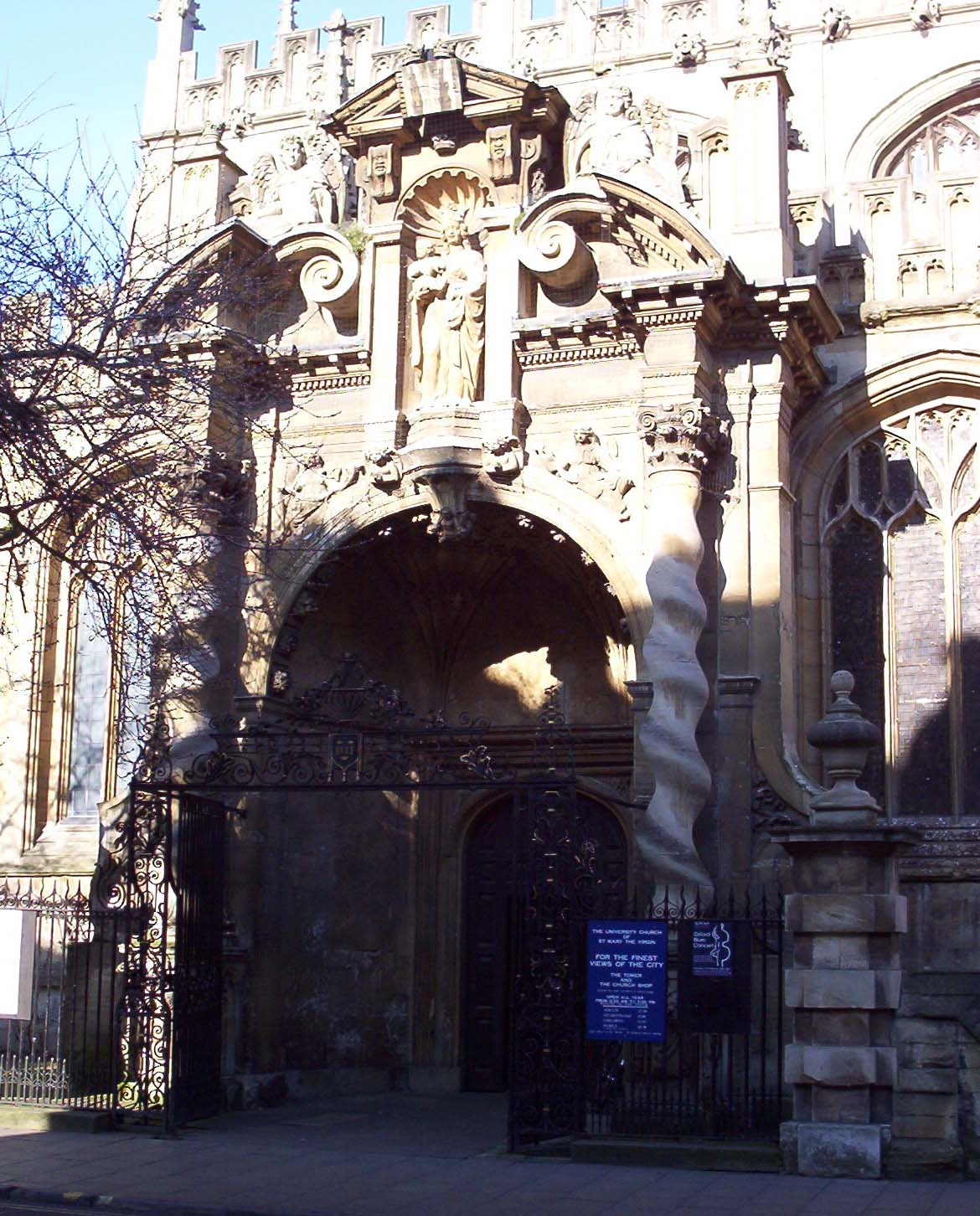
The south porch, designed by Nicholas Stone, viewed from the High Street. Bullet holes in the statue were made by Oliver Cromwell's troops.

The south porch was built in 1637 and was designed by Nicholas Stone, master mason to Charles I. It was a gift from Morgan Owen, chaplain to Archbishop Laud. It is highly ornate, with spiral columns supporting a curly pediment framing a shell niche with a statue of the Virgin and Child, underneath a Gothic fan vault. The style was too close to Roman baroque for the puritans of the day and the porch itself was used as evidence in Laud's execution trial, citing its "scandalous statue" to which one witness saw "one bow and another pray". The gate piers are original and the wrought iron gates are early 18th-century. The bullet holes in the statue were made by Cromwellian troopers.

Around 1328 a chapel was added, now the outer north aisle, by the rector, Adam de Brome. The chancel was rebuilt around 1462 by Walter Hart, Bishop of Norwich, and the nave and aisles were rebuilt around 1490 by the university with donations from Henry VII and several bishops, whose arms decorate the nave. The north wall of de Brome's chapel and the congregation house were remodelled in the Perpendicular style around 1510, and new windows were added to match the others in the church. Around the same time, St Thomas chantry, now a vestry, was added. The nave and aisle windows have panel tracery and flamboyant battlemented parapets with gargoyles and pinnacles.

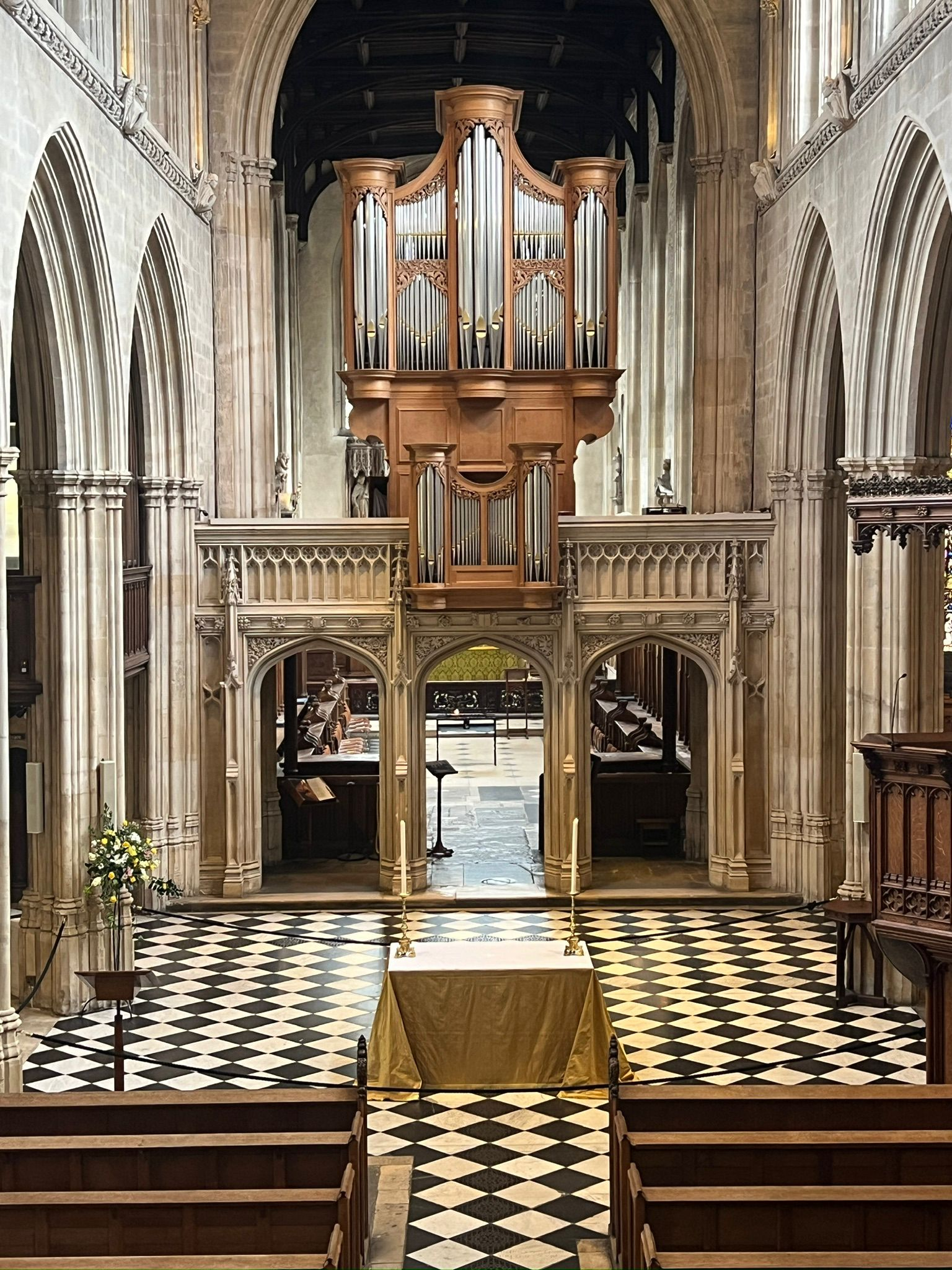
The nave from the gallery, looking towards the organ loft through to the chancel.

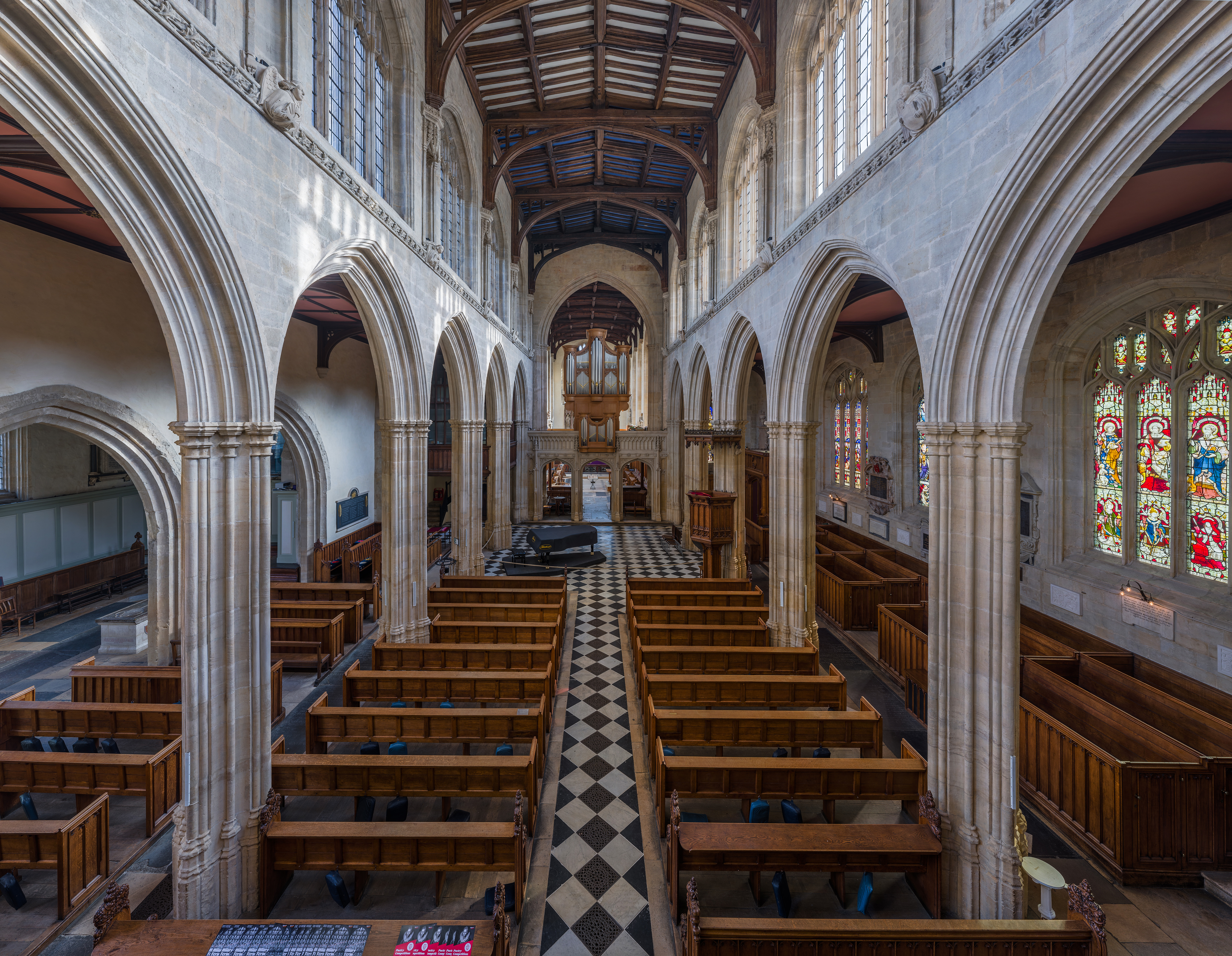
The nave viewed in an easterly direction from the gallery, looking towards the chancel

The interior space has six-bay arcades with shafted piers, between the clerestory windows, are canopied niches with archangels holding shields. The roof has traceried spandrels, the chancel has transomed windows, and the sedilia is decorated with cusped arches and a frieze of vine leaves. The reredos is 15th-century and contains seven ornamental canopied niches containing statues of 1933. Restorations were carried out by Sir George Gilbert Scott in 1856–57 and 1861–62 and by Sir Thomas Graham Jackson in 1894, the parapet and pinnacles are mostly Scott's work. De Brome's chapel has a two-bay arcade with continuous hollow chamfered arches with Perpendicular windows. The tall arch in this aisle, connecting with the tower is a 15th-century remodelling of a late 13th-century window.

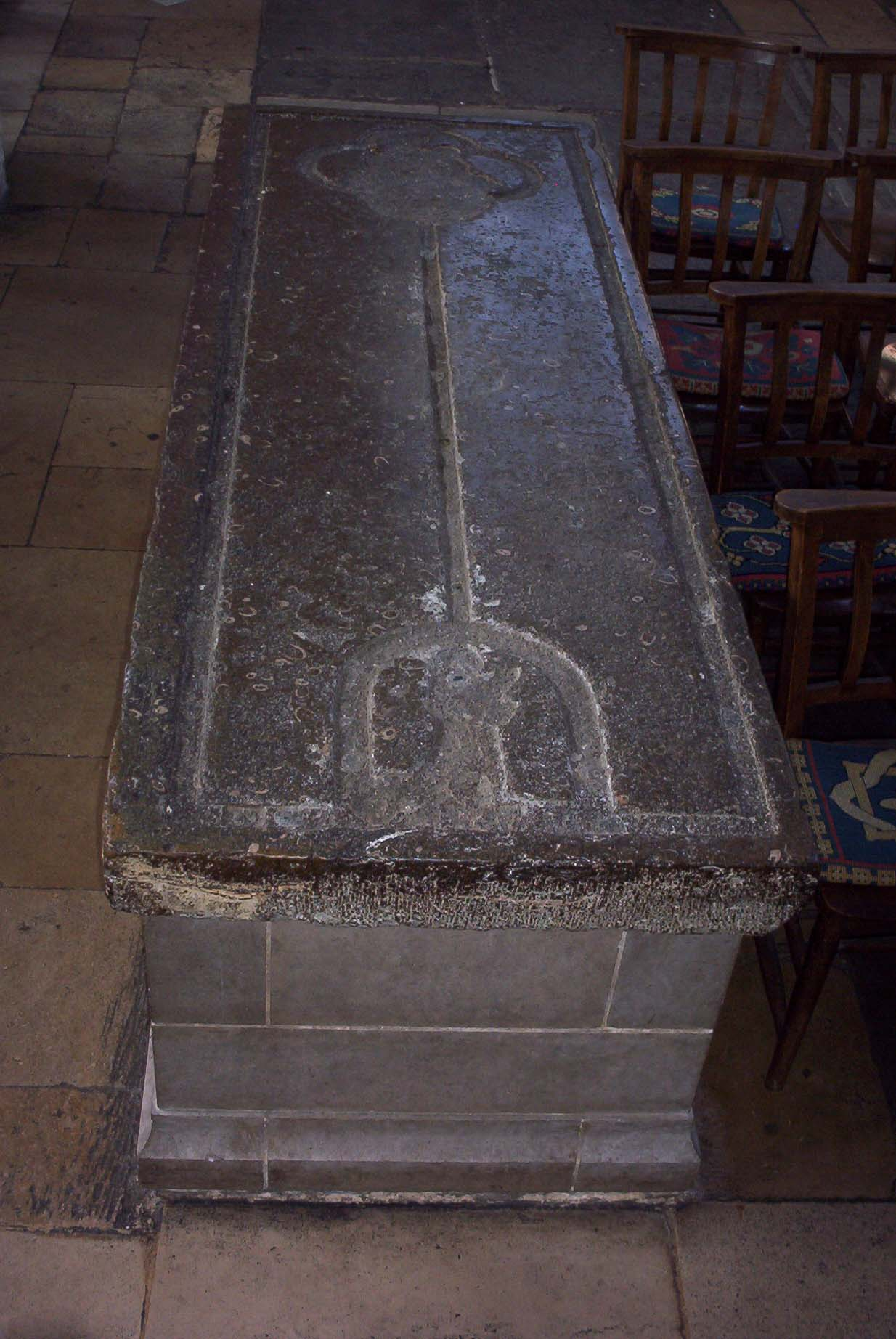
Adam de Brome's tomb, the 14th-century slab rests on a modern chest

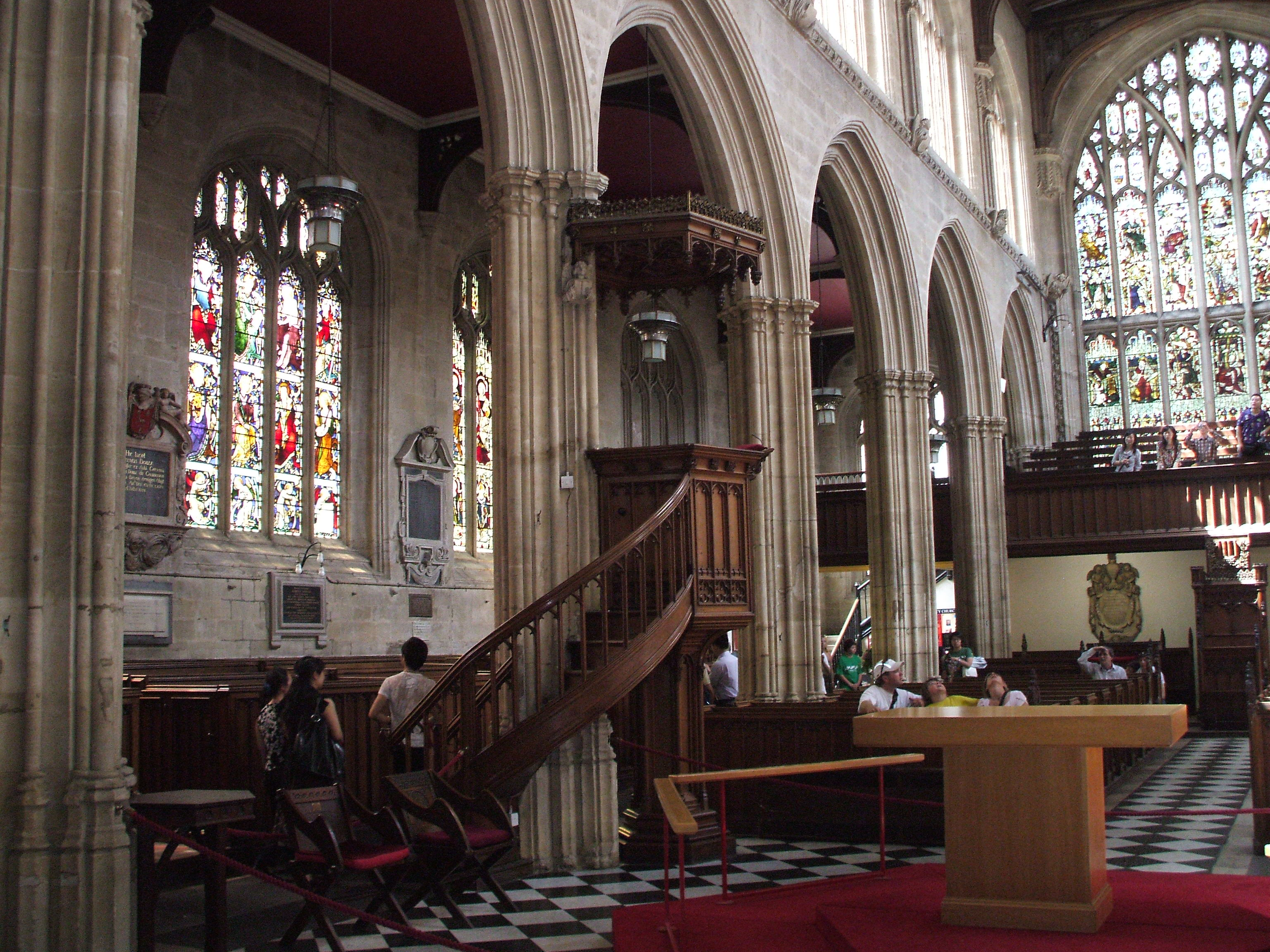
Church's canopied pulpit

Monuments include a slab with indents of a brass cross and the Virgin and Child, thought to commemorate Adam de Brome, from 1332, though the tomb chest is modern. The wall monuments in the nave and chancel are from the late 17th century and 18th century. The floor slab to Amy Robsart, wife of Robert Dudley, is modern.

The church furnishings were refitted in 1826–28 with gothic pews and galleries, the canopied pulpit, the font and chancellor's throne under the west gallery were designed by Thomas Plowman. The chancel has late 15th stalls, the panelling supporting Francesco Bassano the Younger's painting of 'The Adoration of the Shepherds' is late 17th-century, and the communion rail is from around 1675. The de Brome chapel has early 18th-century panelling and chancellor's throne.

The tower is 90 feet (27 metres) high, topped by a spire of 101 feet (31 metres), giving a total height of 191 feet (58 metres).

=== Stained glass ===
There are remnants of 15th-century stained glass in the tracery lights of the east window, and 17th-century shields in the de Brome Chapel.

The east window and the second from the east in the south aisle are from the 19th century and were designed by Augustus Pugin, an English architect, designer, artist and critic principally remembered for his pioneering role in the Gothic Revival style of architecture. The west window in the nave is from 1891 and was designed by C. E. Kempe. The memorial window to John Keble is by Clayton and Bell in 1866.

== Organ ==
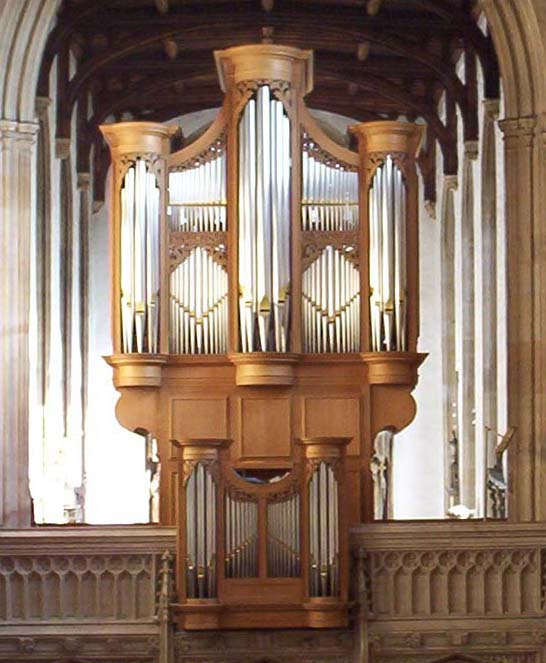
Metzler organ of 1986, one of only two by this maker in Great Britain

The church has a classical organ built by the Swiss firm of Metzler Orgelbau in 1986, one of only two by this esteemed maker in Great Britain. (The other is in the chapel of Trinity College, Cambridge.) This instrument was inspired by a previous instrument, originally built for the church by the famed organ builder "Father" Smith in 1676. Much altered over the years, the last remains of this original organ (besides some fragments of ornamental casework and, possibly, part of one stop) were destroyed by a fire shortly after the Second World War. The Metzler organ replaced this instrument's successor – an organ by J. W. Walker & Sons that was contained in the restored old case, originally by Smith but extensively rebuilt in a 'gothic' style in 1827 by Plowman. The pipework and case of this organ are now in St Mary's Church, Penzance, Cornwall.

The unstained oak case of the Metzler organ is based on the original Smith design and incorporates a few carved wooden pipe shades that remained after the 1827 case rebuild and later fire. It still lacks certain decorative carvings from the original design by Bernhardt Edskes, most notably the large scrolls beneath the pedal towers on the four corners.

I Rückpositiv C–
1.	Gedact	8'
2.	Rohrflote	4'
3.	Principal	4'
4.	Nazard	2^{2}/_{3}'
5.	Octave	2'
6.	Terz	1^{3}/_{5}'
7.	Quint	1^{1}/_{3}'
8.	Scharff	1'
9.	Dulcian	8'
	Tremulant

II Hauptwerk C–
10.	Holflote	8'
11.	Principal	8'
12.	Spitzflote	4'
13.	Octave	4'
14.	Quinte	2^{2}/_{3}'
15.	Superoctave	2'
16.	Terz	1^{3}/_{5}'
17.	Mixtur	1^{1}/_{3}'
18.	Cornet V	8'
19.	Trompete	8'

III Brustwerk C–
20.	Rohrflote	8'
21.	Gedflote	4'
22.	Cornet III

Pedal C–
23.	Subbass	16'
24.	Bourdon	8'
25.	Octavbass	8'
26.	Octave	4'
27.	Mixtur	2'
28.	Posaune	16'
29.	Trompete	8'

- Koppeln: I/II, I/P, II/P

== Present ==
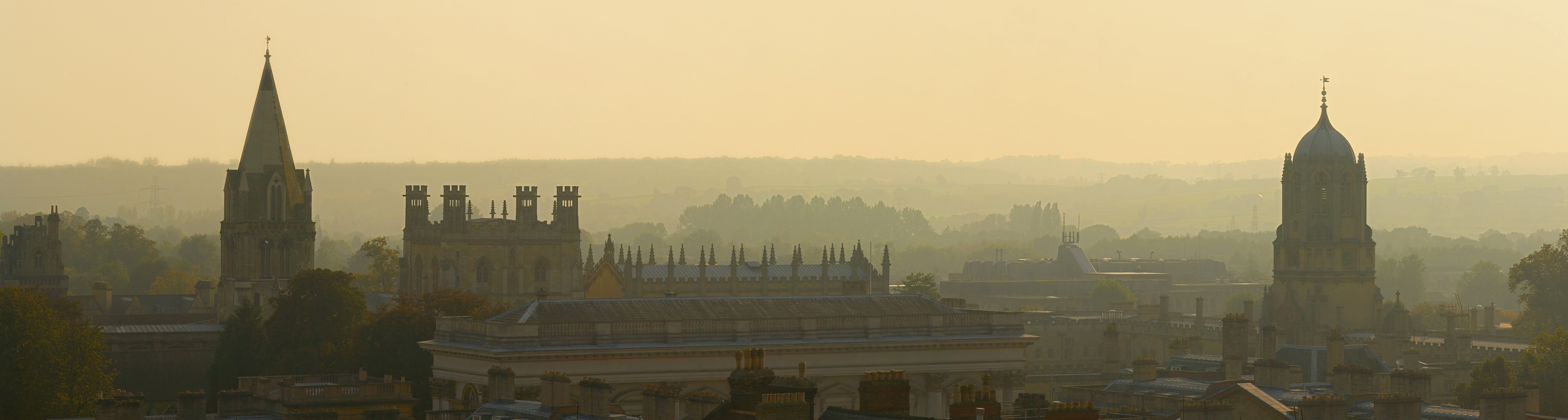
View looking south from the church tower

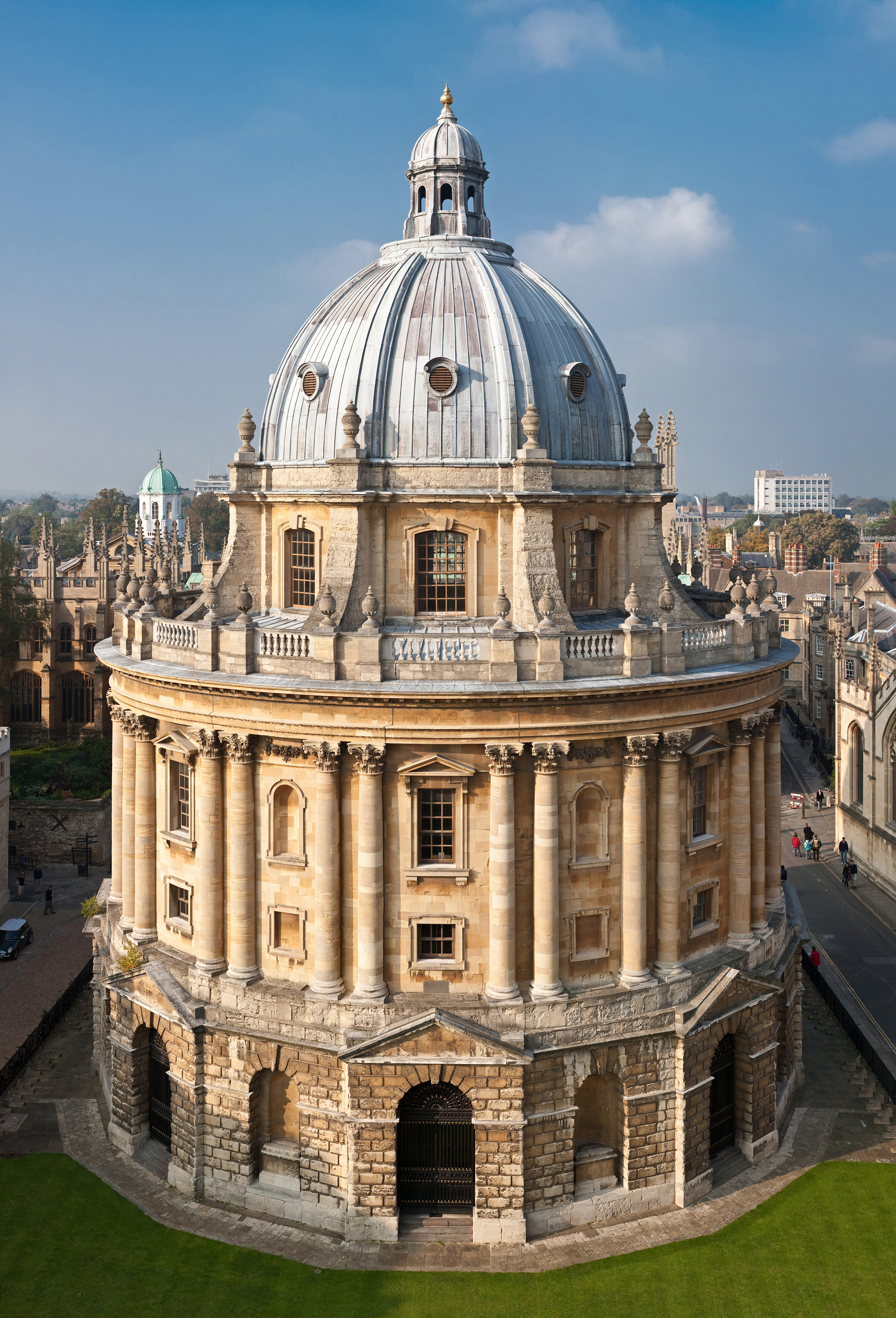
View north from St Mary's, looking into Radcliffe Square, with Brasenose College to the left (west), All Souls College to the right (east), the Bodleian Library, the Sheldonian Theatre and the Divinity School to the left of centre background, and the Radcliffe Camera centrally

The current vicar of St Mary's is the Revd Canon Dr William Lamb. The assistant priest is the Revd Hannah Cartwright. Robert Howarth is the director of music and the organist is James Brown. The churchwardens are Karen Melham and Nicholas Hardyman. There are three Sunday services, at 8:30 am, 10:30 am & 3:30pm. During university terms, services are enhanced by the choir of the University Church and by many notable visiting preachers.

The church is open to visitors throughout the year from 9:00 am to 5:00 pm (July and August 9:00 am to 6:00 pm), except on Christmas Day. On Sundays, the tower does not open until after the morning services.

A German Lutheran service is held on the first Sunday of each month (except January and August).

== List of vicars ==
The following clergy have served as vicar of the church:

- 1345–1348: Nicholas Misterton
- 1349–1351: Robert de Tyrlington
- 1351–1360: Nicholas de Bannebury
- 1361–1379: Thomas Warde de Beronby
- 1379–1384: John de Prestwold
- 1384–1395: John de Ashfordeby
- 1395–1413: John Treen
- 1413–1438: John Plomer
- 1438–1453: John Cothill
- 1453–1461: William Scrivener
- 1461–1466: Robert Careswell
- 1466–1483: William Laughton
- 1483–1485: Robert Offer
- 1485–1487: Richard Ludwick
- 1487–1488: William Westcott
- 1488–1498: Clement Browne
- 1498–1504: Edmund Wylsford
- 1504–1527: John Roper
- 1527–1534: William Appulby
- 1534–1535: John Pitt
- 1535–1551: George Sutton
- 1551–1554: John Tonnery
- 1554–1556: Hugh Hutchinson
- 1556–1578: William Powell
- 1578–1582: Stephen Rowsham
- 1582–1583: Robert Cooke
- 1583–1597: Simon Lee
- 1597–1608: Richard Wharton
- 1608–1622: John Day
- 1622–1638: John Taylor
- 1638–1639: John Horne
- 1639–1646: Henry Eccleston
- 1646–1648: John Duncombe
- 1648–1650: James Tarren
- 1650–1656: William Bragge
- 1656–1676: William Washbourne
- 1676–1693: Robert Kinsey
- 1693–1700: William Walker
- 1700–1720: Peter Randall
- 1720–1754: Thomas Weeksy
- 1754-1754: Charles Whiting
- 1754–1758: Edward Blake
- 1758–1765: John Trewen
- 1765–1768: John Clark
- 1768–1774: William Walker
- 1774–1778: John Flemyng
- 1778–1782: John Eveleigh
- 1782–1790: Henry Beeke
- 1790–1796: Daniel Veysie
- 1796–1797: George Cooke
- 1797–1800: James Landon
- 1800–1810: Edward Copleston
- 1810–1819: William Bishop
- 1819–1823: William James
- 1823–1828: Edward Hawkins
- 1828–1843: John Henry Newman; later a Roman Catholic cardinal
- 1843–1850: Charles Page Eden
- 1850–1858: Charles Marriott
- 1863–1875: John Burgon
- 1876–1878: Drummond Percy Chase
- 1878–1894: Edmund Ffoulkes
- 1894–1896: Cosmo Gordon Lang; later Archbishop of Canterbury
- 1896–1905: Henry Lewis Thompson
- 1905–1923: Charles Augustus Whittuck
- 1923–1927: George Chatterton Richards
- 1927–1933: Frank Russell Barry
- 1933–1938: Frederic Arthur Cockin
- 1938–1947: Dick Milford
- 1947–1961: Roy Stuart Lee
- 1961–1971: Philip Montague Martin
- 1971–1975: Ronald Gordon; later Bishop of Portsmouth and at Lambeth
- 1976–1985: Peter Raphael Cornwell; later a Roman Catholic priest
- 1986–2016: Brian Mountford
- 2017–present: William Lamb

== See also ==
- Chapel of St Mary at Smith Gate, at the northern end of Catte Street
