= Thomas Townson =

English churchman and writer

Thomas Townson (1715–1792) was an English churchman and writer, archdeacon of Richmond from 1781.

== Life ==
Born at Much Lees, Essex, he was the eldest son of John Townson, rector of the parish, by his wife Lucretia, daughter of Edward Wiltshire, rector of Kirk Andrews, Cumberland. He was educated first under the care of Henry Nott, vicar of Terling, and next at Felsted grammar school. He matriculated at Christ Church, Oxford, on 13 March 1733, and was elected a demy of Magdalen College, Oxford, in 1733, and probationary fellow in 1737. He graduated B.A. on 20 October 1736, M.A. on 20 June 1739, B.D. on 13 June 1750, and D.D., by diploma, on 23 February 1779. He was ordained priest in 1742, and, after making a tour on the continent, resumed tutorial work at Oxford.

In 1746 he was instituted to the vicarage of Hatfield Peverel, Essex, and in 1749 he was senior proctor of the university. Resigning Hatfield in the latter year, he was presented to the rectory of Blithfield, Staffordshire, and on 2 January 1752 he was instituted to the lower mediety of Malpas, Cheshire, where he thenceforth resided. In 1758, when he received a bequest of £8,000 from William Barcroft, rector of Fairstead and vicar of Kelvedon in Essex, he resigned Blithfield and applied himself more especially to literary pursuits. On 30 October 1781 he was collated to the archdeaconry of Richmond, and in 1783 was offered by Lord North the regius professorship of divinity at Oxford, which he declined on account of age. He died at Malpas on 15 April 1792.

== Works ==
His works are:

- Doubts concerning the Authenticity of the last Publication of "The Confessional" ... (by Francis Blackburne), London, 1767; and also a Defence of these Doubts, London, 1768.
- A Dialogue between Isaac Walton and Homologistes, concerning Bishop Sanderson, London, 1768.
- Discourses on the Four Gospels, Oxford, 1778; 2nd edit. 1788; two parts of a German translation by Johann Salomo Semler were published at Leipzig, 1783–4.
- A Discourse on the Evangelical History, from the Interment to the Ascension of our Lord Jesus Christ, Oxford, 1793. The editor of this work was the Rev. Thomas Bagshaw, M.A.
- Babylon in the Revelation of St. John, as signifying the City of Rome, edited by Ralph Churton, Oxford, 1797.

There subsequently appeared The Works of Thomas Townson; to which is prefixed an Account of the Author, by R. Churton, 2 vols. London, 1810; and Practical Discourses: a Selection from the unpublished manuscripts of the late Venerable Thomas Townson, D.D., privately printed, London, 1828, with the biographical memoir by Churton. These Discourses were edited by John Jebb; they were reprinted in 1830.
