= William Gresley (divine) =

English divine

William Gresley (16 March 1801 – 19 November 1876) was an English divine. He was a high churchman, who joined in popularising the Tractarian movement of 1833.

== Early life ==
Gresley was born in Kenilworth, Warwickshire, on 16 March 1801. He was the eldest son of Richard Gresley of Stowe House, Lichfield, Staffordshire, who was a descendant of the Gresleys of Drakelow Park, Burton-on-Trent, and a bencher of the Middle Temple. His mother was Richard Gresley's first wife, Caroline, youngest daughter of Andrew Grote, a London banker. George Grote was his first cousin on his mother's side.

Having completed Westminster School as a king's scholar, Gresley matriculated at Oxford as a student of Christ Church on 21 May 1819. In 1822 he obtained a second-class degree in classics, graduating BA on 8 February 1823 and MA (an automatic preferment) on 25 May 1825.

== Career ==
An injury to his eyesight prevented Gresley from studying for the bar. Instead he took holy orders in the Church of England in 1825. He was curate for a short time in 1828 at Drayton-Bassett, near Tamworth, and from 1830 to 1837 the curate of St Chad's, Lichfield. During part of that period he was also morning lecturer at St Mary's Church, Lichfield. By then an earnest high churchman, he threw himself into the Tractarian movement of 1833, and worked to popularise its teachings.

In November 1840 Gresley became a prebendary in Lichfield Cathedral, an honorary preferment. About 1850 Gresley moved to Brighton to act as a volunteer assistant priest in St Paul's, Brighton, preaching there every Sunday evening.

In 1857 Gresley accepted the perpetual curacy of All Saints' Boyne Hill, near Maidenhead, Berkshire, where a church, a parsonage house and schools were being erected at the expense of three ladies living in the Oxford diocese. He settled there before either the church or vicarage was ready, and served there for the rest of his working life.

== Family ==
In 1828 Gresley married Anne Wright, daughter and heiress of John Barker Scott, a Lichfield banker. They had nine children, but he survived them all.

William Gresley himself died at Boyne Hill on 19 November 1876, and was buried in the churchyard there.

== Works ==
In 1835 Gresley published Ecclesiastes Anglicanus: being a Treatise on the Art of Preaching as adapted to a Church of England Congregation, and in 1838 his Portrait of an English Churchman, which ran through many editions. In 1839 he began with Edward Churton a series of religious and social tales under the general title of The Englishman's Library, 31 vols., London, 1840–39–46. Of these tales he wrote six:

- Clement Walton, or the English Citizen (vol. i)
- The Siege of Lichfield, a Tale illustrative of the Great Rebellion (vol. xiii)
- Charles Lever, or the Man of the Nineteenth Century (vol. xv)
- The Forest of Arden, a Tale Illustrative of the English Reformation (vol. xix)
- Church-Clavering, or The Schoolmaster (vol. xxiv), in which he argues for Church of England control of education
- Coniston Hall, or the Jacobites (vol. xxxi)

To describe the influence on his mind of the Oxford Movement and to illustrate the "danger of dissent", he wrote Bernard Leslie, or a Tale of the Last Ten Years, London, 1842 and 1859. To The Juvenile Englishman's Library (21 vols., 1845–44–49), edited successively by his friends Francis Edward Paget and John Fuller Russell, he contributed Henri de Clermont, or the Royalists of La Vendée: a Tale of the French Revolution (vol. iii.), and Colton Green, a Tale of the Black Country (vol. xv).

Gresley's 1851 "Ordinance of Confession" caused a considerable stir, although he did not wish to make confession compulsory. Later in life, with a view to checking the spread of scepticism, he published "Sophron and Neologus, or Common Sense Philosophy", in 1861; "Thoughts on the Bible" in 1871; "Priests and Philosophers" in 1873; and "Thoughts on Religion and Philosophy" in 1875. Selection from the last two were published in 1879 as "The Scepticism of the Nineteenth Century", with a short account of the author and portrait of him by a former curate, S. C. Austen.

His other writings include:

- Sermons on some of the Social and Political Duties of a Christian, London, 1836
- The Necessity of Zeal and Moderation in the present circumstances of the Church enforced and illustrated in Five Sermons preached before the University of Oxford, London, 1839
- Some Thoughts on the Means of working out the Scheme of Diocesan Education, London, 1839
- Remarks on the necessity of attempting a Restoration of the National Church, London, 1841
- Parochial Sermons, London, 1842
- The Spiritual Condition of the Young: Thoughts suggested by the Confirmation Service, London, 1843
- St. Stephen: Death for Truth, as No. ix. of Tracts for Englishmen, 1844
- Anglo-Catholicism. A short Treatise on the Theory of the English Church, London, 1844
- Frank's First Trip to the Continent (Burns's 'Fireside Library'), London, 1845
- Suggestions on the New Statute to be proposed in the University of Oxford, London, 1845
- A Short Treatise on the English Church, London, 1845
- Evangelical Truth and Apostolical Order; a Dialogue, London, 1846
- The Real Danger of the Church of England, 8vo, London, 1846; 6th edit. 1847
- A Second Statement of the Real Danger of the Church of England... containing Answers to certain Objections [by F. Close and others] which have been made against his former Statement, London, 1846
- A Third Statement of the real danger of the Church of England, setting forth the distinction between Romanists and Anglicans, and the identity of Evangelicals and Puritans, London, 1847
- Practical Sermons, London, 1848
- "The Use of Confirmation" (No. xi. of The London Parochial Tracts, 1848, etc.)
- A Word of Remonstrance with the Evangelicals, addressed to the Rev. Francis Wilson... in reply to his Pamphlet called "No Peace with Tractarianism", 8vo, London, 1850; 3rd ed, 1851
- A Help to Prayer, in Six Tracts, Oxford and London, 1850
- Stand Fast and Hope. A Letter; on the decision of the Privy Council in the Gorham case, London, 1850
- Distinctive Tenets of the Church of England, 4th edit., London, 1851
- A Second Word of Remonstrance with the Evangelicals, London, 1851
- A Letter to the Dean of Bristol [G. Elliott] on what he considers the "Fundamental Error" of Tractarianism, London, 1851
- A Letter on Confession and Absolution … in reply to a Letter and Speeches of the Rev. R. J. McGhee, London, 1852
- The Present State of the Controversy with Rome. Three Sermons, London, 1855
- Answer to a Letter of the Rev. E. B. Elliott addressed to the Rev. W. Gresley on the "Delusion of the Tractarian Clergy as to the Validity of their Ministerial Orders", London, 1856
- Position of the Church and the Duty of her Members in regard to the Denison Case, London, 1856
- Sermons preached at Brighton, London, 1858
- Boyne Hill Tracts. By W. G., London, 1858
- Idealism considered; chiefly with reference to a volume of "Essays and Reviews" lately published, London, 1860
- The Prayer-Book as it is, London, 1865
