= Dorothea Braby =

British artist (1909-1987)

- Born: 17 October 1909; London
- Died: 1987 (aged 77–78)
- Known for: Design, illustration

Dorothea Braby (17 October 1909 – 1987) was a British artist. Although she had a long career as a freelance designer producing work for several well-known companies, Braby is best known for the book illustrations she created, particularly those for the Golden Cockerel Press.

== Early life ==
Braby was born in Wandsworth and grew up in Putney, the third child of Percy Braby, a solicitor, and Maud Churton Braby, a journalist and author who had been born in China. Braby was educated at the St Felix School in Southwold, and then from 1926 to 1930 at the Central School of Arts and Crafts in London. For a time she was enrolled at the Heatherley School of Fine Art and also studied art in Paris and Florence.

== Career ==
Braby's work was mostly as an illustrator of books, including several volumes produced by the Golden Cockerel Press. She spent eighteen months working on their 1948 edition of the Mabinogion. For The Saga of Llywarch the Old, Braby created colour engravings that resembled mediaeval ivory tablets. Among the other books she illustrated were a 1950 edition of John Keats' Poems and a 1954 edition of Oscar Wilde's Lord Arthur Savile's Crime. Her own volume, The Way of Wood Engraving was published in 1953. Braby exhibited widely, both in Britain and overseas. The Society of Women Artists, the Hampstead Artists' Council, and the Arts Council of Great Britain all showed works by Braby.

During her design career, Braby also produced work for The Radio Times, The Studio, and ICI.

In 1959, she gave up working as an artist for a full-time career as a social worker. A memorial exhibition was held at Burgh House, Hampstead, in 1988.

== Selected works ==
Books illustrated by Braby included

- Mr Chambers and Perephone by C.Whitfield, Golden Cockerel Press, 1937
- The Ninety-First Psalm by C.Whitfield, Golden Cockerel Press, 1944
- The Lottery Ticket by V.G.Calderon, Golden Cockerel Press, 1945
- The Mabinogion by V.G.Calderon, Golden Cockerel Press, 1948
- Gilgamesh, King of Erech by F.L. Lucas, Golden Cockerel Press, 1948
- Poems by John Keats, Folio Society, 1950
- Sir Gawain and the Green Knight, Golden Cockerel Press, 1952
- The Fearless Treasure by Noel Streatfeild, Joseph, 1953
- Lord Arthur Savile's Crime by Oscar Wilde, Folio Society, 1954
- The Semi-Attached Couple by Emily Eden, Folio Society, 1954
- The Saga of Llywarch the Old by Glyn Jones, Golden Cockerel Press, 1955

Braby also wrote and illustrated The Commandments, published by Lewis in 1946, and The Way of Wood Engraving, published in 1953.
