= Wilfrid Hornby =

Wilfrid Bird Hornby was an Anglican colonial bishop at the end of the 19th century and the beginning of the 20th.

Born on 25 February 1851 and educated at Marlborough and Brasenose College, Oxford he was ordained in 1876. In 1880 he went on the Oxford Mission to Calcutta, returning in 1884. From 1885 to 1892 he was Vicar of St Columba's, Southwick, Sunderland when he was elevated to the episcopate as Bishop of Nyasaland. After only two years he returned to England, where he was rector of St Clement's Church in Norwich then Vicar of Chollerton. In 1904 he was appointed Bishop of Nassau, a post he held until 1919. He died on 5 June 1935.

== Notes ==
Religious titles
Preceded by Charles Smythies as Bishop in Central Africa	Bishop of Nyasaland; 1892 –1894	Succeeded by Chauncy Maples as Bishop of Likoma
Preceded by Henry Norris Churton	Bishop of Nassau; 1904 –1919	Succeeded by Roscow George Shedden
