= Charles Caulfield =

Charles Caulfield, D.D (1804–1862) was an Anglican colonial bishop in the 19th century.

Caulfield was born in Kilkenny, the oldest son of the Reverend Hans Caulfield (1778–1851), rector of Kilmanagh, and Anne née Rothe (1783–1852). He was admitted, aged 17, to Trinity College Dublin in 1821. He was Archdeacon of the Bahamas. He was consecrated Bishop of Nassau and the Bahamas at Lambeth Palace on 1 December 1861. He died of yellow fever at New Providence on 4 September 1862.

He married Grace St George, daughter of Sir Richard St George, 2nd Baronet, another County Kilkenny man, and his second wife Bridget Blakeney, daughter of Theophilus Blakeney, and had several children. Grace died in 1896.

== Notes ==
Religious titles
Preceded by Inaugural appointment	Bishop of Nassau; 1861 –1862	Succeeded by Addington Robert Peel Venables
