= Addington Venables =

Anglican colonial Bishop

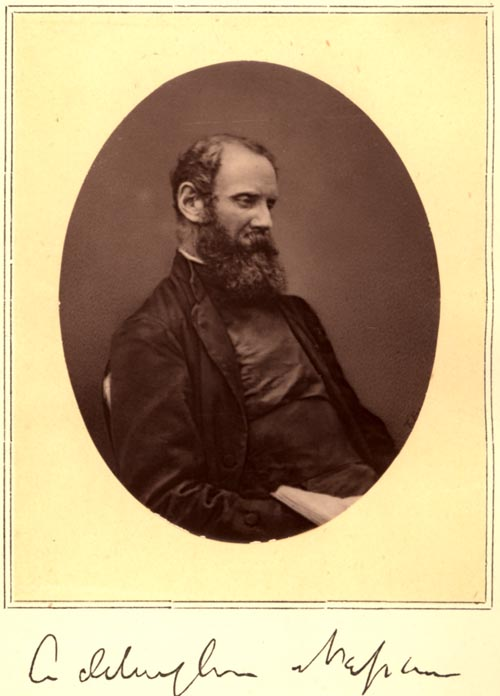
Addington Venables

Addington Robert Peel Venables, D.D. (1827–1876) was an Anglican colonial bishop in the 19th century.

== Life ==
He was the son of Thomas Venables, "Receiver of the Eight Police-offices" and private secretary to Henry Addington and then Sir Robert Peel, two Prime Ministers who were his godfathers and from whom he took his forenames; his mother Anne King was daughter of John King. He was educated at Eton College. He matriculated at Exeter College, Oxford in 1845, graduating B.A. in 1848. He was consecrated Bishop of Nassau in 1863. He died in post in 1876.

== Family ==
His son, Major Charles John Venables of the Gloucestershire Regiment, served with distinction in the Boer War and was mentioned in despatches, won the Queen's Medal with two clasps and the DSO. He was killed at Gallipoli in 1915.

== Notes ==
Religious titles
Preceded by Charles Caulfield	Bishop of Nassau; 1863 –1876	Succeeded by Francis Alexander Randal Cramer-Roberts
