= Henry Churton =

British Anglican bishop (1843–1904)

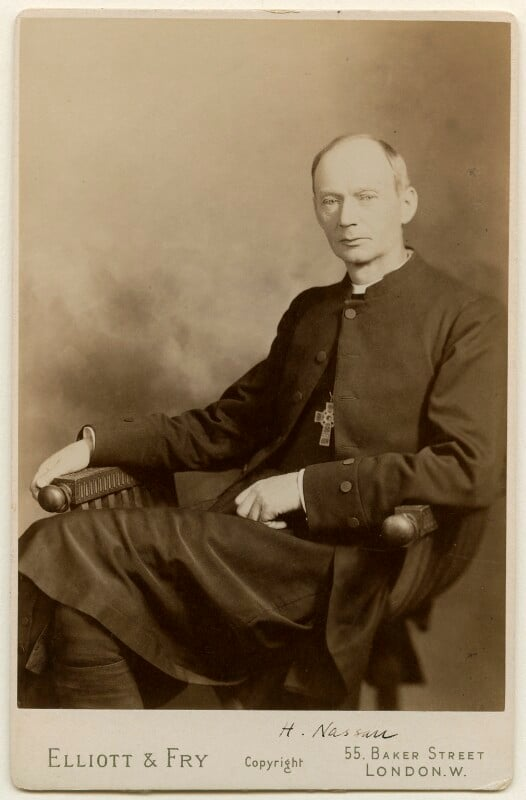
Churton c. 1902–04

Henry Norris Churton (15 January 1843 – 20 January 1904) was an Anglican colonial bishop in the 20th century.

== Early life and education ==
Churton was born in 1843 into an ecclesiastical family, the son of Edward Churton, Archdeacon of Cleveland. He was educated at Eton and University College, Oxford; and ordained in 1868.

== Career ==
His first posts were curacies at Stoke-on-Trent and East Retford. From 1872 to 1879 he was Vicar of St John Evangelist, West Bromwich then Perpetual Curate of St James’ Chapel, Avonwick. Later he was Archdeacon of the Bahamas before being ordained to the episcopate in 1902, succeeding his elder brother (Edward) as Bishop of Nassau. He was consecrated bishop by the Archbishop of Canterbury at St Paul's Cathedral on 13 July 1902. He had previously received the honorary degree Doctor of Divinity (DD) from the University of Oxford in May 1902.

== Death and legacy ==
He died in a yachting accident on 20 January 1904.

Anglican Communion titles
Preceded by Edward Churton	Bishop of Nassau; 1902 –1904	Succeeded by Wilfrid Bird Hornby
