= Michael Eldon =

Anglican bishop

The Right Rev. Michael Hartley Eldon C.M.G. (8 August 1931 - 7 February 2011) was the Bishop of the Bahamas and the Turks & Caicos Islands from 1972 to 1996. Eldon was made a companion of the Order of Saint Michael and Saint George in 1984.

== Early life and education ==
Eldon was born on 8 August 1931, the son of Sidney and Rowena Eldon, and the older of two children. He attended Queen's College and St Catharine's College, Cambridge.

== Career ==
Eldon was ordained as a bishop in 1955. After curacies in Nassau, he spent nine years on Grand Bahama, becoming archdeacon of the island. In 1971, he was consecrated Suffragan Bishop of New Providence. In 1972, Eldon became the first Bahamian Bishop of Nassau, retiring 25 years later.

Eldon also taught mathematics at St. John's College and served as the first chairman of the College of the Bahamas.

Eldon was made a companion of the Order of Saint Michael and Saint George in the Queen's 1984 New Year's Honours.

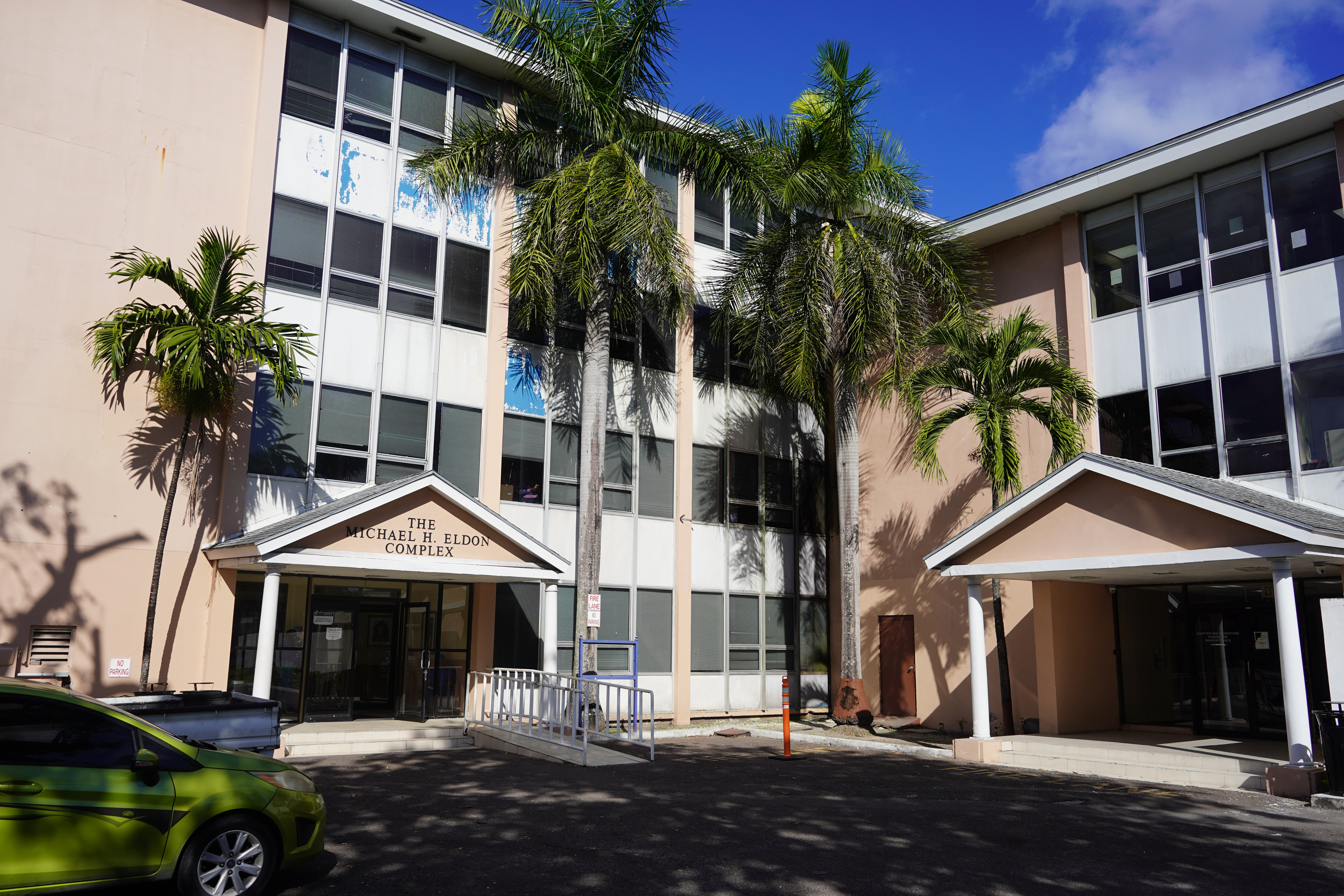
Michael H. Eldon Complex at the University of The Bahamas

== Death and legacy ==
In 2006, the University of the Bahamas inaugurated the Michael H. Eldon complex in honour of Eldon's contributions to the university and higher education.

Eldon died on 7 February 2011, a week before his sister, Keva Bethel, the former President of the College of the Bahamas.

Eldon was the subject of the 2012 book, Faithful Servant: Reflections on the Life of The Right Reverend Michael Hartley Eldon, CMG.

Anglican Communion titles
Preceded by Bernard Markham	Bishop of Nassau; 1971 –1996	Succeeded by Drexel Gomez
