= Francis Edward Paget =

English clergyman and author

Francis Edward Paget (1806–1882) was an English clergyman and author.

== Life ==
Born on 24 May 1806, he was eldest son of Sir Edward Paget by his first wife, Frances, daughter of William Bagot, 1st Baron Bagot. On 16 September 1817 he was admitted to Westminster School; he then went to Christ Church, Oxford, matriculating on 3 June 1824. From 1825 to 1836 he held a studentship there, and graduated B.A. in 1828, and M.A. in 1830.

Paget was a supporter of the Oxford Movement. In 1835 he was presented to the rectory of Elford near Lichfield, and for some years was chaplain to Richard Bagot, bishop of Bath and Wells. Elford Church was restored under his auspices in 1848, and its dedication festival was made an occasion of annual reunion among Staffordshire churchmen. He published an account of the church in 1870.

On 2 June 1840 he married Fanny, daughter of William Chester, rector of Denton, Norfolk.

Paget died at Elford on 4 August 1882, and was buried there on 8t August 1882.

== Works ==
Paget's views on church and social reforms found expression in many tales, including:

- Caleb Kniveton, the Incendiary, Oxford, 1833.
- St. Antholin's, or Old Churches and New, London, 1841; a protest against building churches after the "cheap and nasty" method.
- Milford Malvoisin, or Pews and Pewholders, London, 1842.
- The Warden of Berkingholt, or Rich and Poor, Oxford, 1843.
- The Owlet of Owlstone Edge, London, 1856.
- The Curate of Cumberworth and the Vicar of Roost, London, 1859.
- Lucretia, or the Heroine of the Nineteenth Century, London, 1868; a satire on the sensational novel.
- The Pageant,

and others. To The Englishman's Library, from 1840, he contributed Tales of the Village; and to The Juvenile Englishman's Library, from 1845, of which he was for some time editor:

- Tales of the Village Children, two series;
- The Fairy Godmother; or, the Adventures of Prince Eigenwillig. A Tale for Youth Illustrating the Use of Discipline under the pseudonym "William Churne."
- The Hope of the Katzekopfs, a fairy tale, issued separately under the pseudonym of "William Churne of Staffordshire", Rugeley, 1844 (on which an extravaganza in verse, called "Eigenwillig, or the Self-willed", was founded, London, 1870); and
- Luke Sharp.

While examining manuscripts at Levens Hall, Westmoreland, Paget came across some letters from Richard Graham (1679–1697), youngest son of Colonel James Graham (1649–1730), who died prematurely while keeping terms at University College, Oxford, and his tutor, Hugh Todd. These formed the basis of A Student Penitent of 1695, London, 1875. He also published sermons, prayers, and religious treatises. His last work, entitled Homeward Bound, London, 1876, attracted some attention. In 1840 he edited Simon Patrick's Discourse concerning Prayer and Treatise of Repentance and of Fasting, to rank with the series of reprints from the writings of English bishops issued by John Henry Newman.

The privately printed Some Records of the Ashtead Estate and of its Howard Possessors: with Notices of Elford, Castle Rising, Levens, and Charlton, Lichfield, 1873, was a compilation from family papers and other sources.
