= Maud Churton Braby =

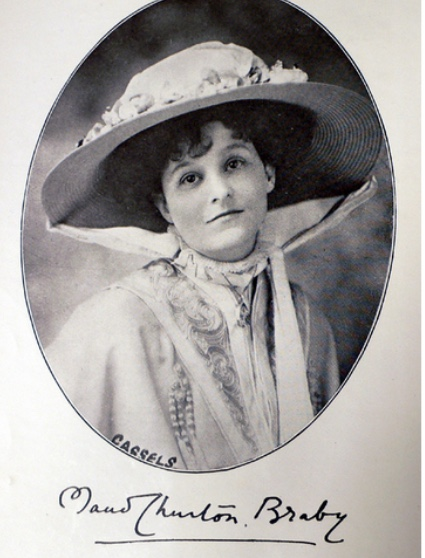
Maud Churton Braby about 1911

Julia Maud Churton Braby (1875 – 31 December 1932) was an English journalist and author born in China, notable for her best-sellers on love and marriage, especially Modern Marriage and How to Bear It (1908).

All of her work was published, unusually for the period, as “Maud Churton Braby” with her maiden name added before her married name.

== Early life ==
Maud Churton’s parents, Charles Stanley Churton, an apothecary, and Emilie Hart, spinster, were married at the British Consulate in Shanghai, Empire of China, on 18 December 1869.

Their daughters Constance, Lucy Madeline, and Julia Maud, and their son Stanley Douglas, were born in China, but by 1881 the family had returned to England and settled at Paignton, Devon. Julia Maud was educated at a Church of England convent school, then later at a finishing school in Germany. Her parents were by then living in London, but her mother died in January 1899 at Lewisham. In February 1901, her father married secondly, at Ladbroke Grove, Mary Anne Elizabeth Hole, daughter of a physician, and the following year was living at Catford.

On 20 December 1902, Maud Churton married Percy Braby, a solicitor, at St Andrew’s, Ashley Place, St George Hanover Square.

== Career ==
Braby began her writing career in journalism. In 1905 she published an interview with W. T. Stead, who had campaigned successfully for the raising of the age of consent, and in 1906 one with George Bernard Shaw about women's suffrage.

Braby’s Modern Marriage and How to Bear It was published in 1908, gaining great success, and was followed by further similar works.

The Brabys’ daughter Dorothea was born in Wandsworth in 1909 and later became an artist.

At the time of the 1911 United Kingdom census, the Brabys were living in Putney with their three children and three servants. Unusually, Maud completed the census return, describing herself on the first line as “wife (Head)” and adding Percy on the second line, described as “husband (Sub-head)”.

When Braby’s father died on 5 October 1911 he was of Overcourt Hassocks, Sussex, and left property worth £16,470.

In September 1924, Percy Braby died in Helsinki, Finland, leaving a substantial estate in England valued at £22,195, equivalent to £1,166,649 in 2025.

Maud Churton Braby died in London on the last day of 1932, leaving an estate valued at £13,800. At the time of her death she was living at 49, Trafalgar Square, Chelsea.

== Selected publications ==
- ”W. T. STEAD Interviewed by Mrs Maud Churton Braby“ in The World of Dress, June 1905
- ”GBS and a Suffragist: An Intimate interview by Maud Churton Braby” in The Tribune, 12 March 1906
- Modern Marriage and How to Bear It (1908, reprinted by B&R Samizdat Express, 2018), containing
  - ”The Mutual Dissatisfaction of the Sexes”
  - ”Why Men Don't Marry”
  - ”Why Women Don't Marry”
  - ”The Tragedy of the Undesired”
  - ”The Various Kinds of Marriage”
  - ”The Age to Marry”
  - ”Wild Oats for Wives”
  - ”A Plea for the Wiser Training of Girls”
  - ”The Fiasco of Free Love”
  - ”Polygamy at the Polite Dinner Table”
  - ”A Word for Duogamy”
  - ”The Advantages of the Preliminary Canter”
  - ”To Beget or not to Beget — the Question of the Day”
  - ”The Pros and Cons of the Limited Family”
  - ”A Few Suggestions for Reform”
- Die Moderne Ehe und Wie Man Sie Ertragen Soll (translation into German of Modern Marriage and How to Bear It, 1909)
- Downward: A “Slice of Life” (London, 1910; New York: William Rickey, 1912; reprinted 2018)
- The Love-Seeker: a guide to modern marriage (London: Herbert Jenkins, 1913)
- The Honey of Romance: being the tragic love-story of a publisher's wife (1915)
