= James Burns (publisher) =

Scottish publisher and author (1808 – 1871)

- Born: 1808
- Died: April 1871 (aged 62–63)
- Occupations: publisher and author

James Burns (1808 – 11 April 1871) was a Scottish publisher and author.

During the last half of the nineteenth century his work in the cause of Catholic literature and the music of the Catholic Church contributed much to the rapid advancement of the Church in Great Britain and to the many conversions that were made throughout that period.

== Life ==
Burns was born near Montrose, Angus. His father was a Presbyterian minister and sent him to a college in Glasgow with the idea that he should follow the same calling. But feeling no inclination for it, he left the school in 1832 and went to London where he found employment with a publishing firm. He acquired a knowledge of the trade and then set up for himself in a modest way. He soon won success and Anglican ministers adopted him in their literary campaign of tracts and polemic publications. He then became a "Puseyite", or High Church man. From his press were issued books of a high literary tone in the series he called The Englishman's Library and The Fireside Library. The Oxford Movement under John Henry Newman drew him within its range, and he became a Catholic convert in 1847.

The Anglican publications of the old house were sold off. Burns succeeded, in a comparatively brief time, in building up a reputation as publisher of Catholic literature. To his "Popular Library" Cardinal Wiseman contributed Fabiola and Cardinal Newman, Callista. Other volumes from well-known writers, prayer books, and books of devotion made the name of the firm of Burns & Oates a household name.

Burns himself also wrote constantly on church music, and edited and republished many compositions. He died from cancer in London.

== Family ==
He was the son of Rev. William Hamilton Burns and Elizabeth (died 20th June 1879), daughter of James Chalmers, proprietor of the Aberdeen Journal, Aberdeen, and Margaret Douglas of Tilquhillie. Amongst his siblings was William, an evangelist and missionary to China, Islay, a Scottish theologian and writer, and Walter, a music publisher in Belfast.

His widow, who was also a convert, survived him twenty-two years, dying a member of the Ursuline community at Pittsburgh, Pennsylvania, U.S.A., January 1893. Of his five daughters, four entered the Ursuline Order and the other became a Sister of Charity. His only son was ordained a priest, serving for a long time as chaplain at Nazareth House, Hammersmith, London.
