= Library of the Fathers =

Collection of early Christian writings

The Library of the Fathers, more properly A library of fathers of the holy Catholic church: anterior to the division of the East and West, was a series of around 50 volumes of the Church Fathers, annotated in English translation, published 1838 to 1881 by John Henry Parker. Edited by Edward Bouverie Pusey and others including John Keble and John Henry Newman, this series of editions is closely associated with the origins of the Oxford Movement.

== Overview ==
The series was planned by Pusey in summer 1836, and Pusey, Keble and Newman jointly signed the Prospectus which announced it. Over 600 subscribers had been secured by 1838, including nine English bishops as well as both Archbishops, William Howley and Edward Venables-Vernon-Harcourt. By 1853 thirty-seven volumes had appeared, and the number of listed subscribers had doubled to over 1,200. However, by that time editorial costs were swallowing any profits, and the fragmentation of the Oxford Movement had also caused some of the early subscribers to discontinue their support. The new Archbishops, John Bird Sumner and Thomas Musgrave, never subscribed. "After 1853 [...] there is a clear sense of the winding down of the series."

Though most of the works in the library were translations, a few were editions of original texts. The first volume issued, in 1838, was a translation edited by Pusey of Augustine's Confessions; the last, in 1881, were works of Cyril of Alexandria. There were sixteen volumes of Chrysostom published in the Library, twelve of Augustine, five of Athanasius and four of Gregory the Great on Job.

Most translations in the series were signed. Some anonymous translations may be due to Charles Marriott, who replaced Newman as editor after Newman converted to Roman Catholicism, and who "shouldered the greatest part of the editorial burden from 1845 to 1853".

== See also ==
- Library of Anglo-Catholic Theology
- Parker Society
