= Charles Marriott (priest) =

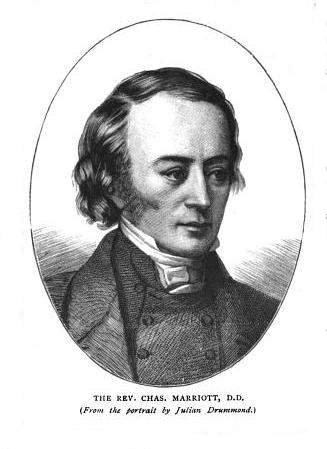
Charles Marriott

Charles Marriott (1811–1858) was an Anglican priest, a fellow of Oriel College, Oxford, and one of the members of the Oxford Movement. He was responsible for editing more than half of the volumes of their series of translations, the Library of the Fathers.

== Life ==
He was born in 1811, the son of clergyman and poet John Marriott, a friend of Sir Walter Scott. He was educated at home, as his health did not permit him to endure the rigours of a public school. He went up to Balliol College, Oxford in 1829, and gained a first in classics and a second in mathematics. He was annoyed at his failure to get a double first, but his physical strength did not permit him to do the study necessary. In 1833, he obtained a fellowship at Oriel College, and became associated with John Henry Newman. In 1839, he became principal of the Chichester Theological College, preparing young men for the Church of England ministry, but was obliged to resign after two years in poor health.

In 1841, he was elected sub-dean at Oriel College. His return to Oxford coincided with Newman's move to the Roman Catholic Church. This provoked a backlash in the university against the Oxford Movement, which was already under suspicion of popery. In the absence of any real leader Marriott attempted to fill the gap and steady the group, although it was generally acknowledged that he was a follower rather than a leader by temperament. He became entangled in a vast correspondence with those thrown into confusion by Newman's defection, and did his best to encourage and support the waverers.

Marriott was a nervous man, and very generous of both time and money. The consequence was that he was often distracted from tasks that he alone could do in order to do drudge-work. His early literary promise was undermined by this tendency to grasp at any nearby task, whether it was his to do or not, and he published little of his own.

In 1842, he took over the editing of the Library of the Fathers, and continued to run the project until his death. He was invariably found compiling indexes and other menial tasks connected with this, often with a headache, to the disgust of his friends.

In 1850, he became Vicar of the University Church of St Mary the Virgin, where Newman had once preached. He proved to be a popular and successful vicar, although this led to yet further demands on his time. During the cholera outbreak of 1854, he visited the sick industriously.

In 1855, he was paralysed by a stroke. He was taken to his brother's house at Bradfield in Berkshire, where he lived for three more years, unable to do anything. He died in 1858.

His lasting legacy is the volumes of the Library of the Fathers, which are often the only English translations that have ever been made of most of the works in question. The majority have been reprinted in the Nicene and Post-Nicene Fathers series, without the copious notes to which Marriott and his colleagues devoted so much time.

== Bibliography ==
- John William Burgon, Twelve Good Men. Contains an article on Marriott.
- T. Mozley, Remniscences, mainly of Oriel College and the Oxford Movement. Brief mention of Marriott at the end of vol. 1.
