= William John Copeland =

English clergyman and scholar (1804–1885)

William John Copeland (1804–1885) was an English clergyman and scholar.

== Life ==
He was the son of William Copeland, surgeon, of Chigwell, Essex, where he was born on 1 September 1804. He was first taught at Chigwell School, then at eleven years old admitted to St Paul's School, London (11 September 1815), where he won the English verse prize (1823) and the high master's prize for the best Latin essay (1824). In the latter year he went with a Pauline exhibition to Trinity College, Oxford, and, like another distinguished sympathiser with Tractarian doctrines, John Henry Newman, was first a scholar and then a fellow of that college.

Trinity College ranked second to Oriel College only in sympathy with the Oxford Movement, and Copeland, though never wavering in his attachment to the Church of England, was close to all the leading Tractarians of the university. While at college he was ill and took no honours; but he was always known as one of the best Latin scholars at Oxford. His degrees were B.A. 1829, M.A. 1831, and B.D. 1840, and he was duly elected to a fellowship. In 1829 he was ordained to the curacy of St Olave, Jewry; for the next three years he was curate of Hackney; and in 1832 he went to Oxford. In 1840, he became curate of St Mary and St Nicholas, Littlemore under Newman.

In 1849, he accepted the college living of Farnham, Essex. This was his sole preferment in the church, and he rebuilt the parish church with care. After a long illness he died at the rectory on 26 August 1885. Part of his library passed, by the agency of his nephew William Copeland Borlase, to the National Liberal Club.

== Works ==
He collected materials for, but did not actually to write, a history of the Tractarian movement. Newman dedicated to Copeland his ‘Sermons on Subjects of the Day’ as the kindest of friends, and Copeland edited eight volumes of Newman's Parochial and Plain Sermons (1868), an edition which was reprinted, besides printing a volume of selections.

The Homilies of St. John Chrysostom on the Epistle to the Ephesians were translated by Copeland, and included in the fifth volume of the Library of the Fathers; and Thomas Mozley says that Copeland contributed to the anonymous Tracts for the Times.
