= Ralph Churton =

English churchman and academic

Ralph Churton (1754 – 1831) was an English churchman and academic, archdeacon of St David's and a biographer.

== Life ==
He was born on an estate called the Snabb, in the township of Bickley and parish of Malpas, Cheshire, on 8 December 1754, being the younger of two sons of Thomas Churton and Sarah Clemson. He was educated in the grammar school of Malpas, and after the loss of both parents, who died while he was very young, he found a friend and benefactor in Dr. Thomas Townson, rector of Malpas, who recommended that he should be entered at Brasenose College, Oxford (1772), and who paid half of his expenses at the university. He graduated B.A. in 1775 and M.A. in 1778 and was elected a fellow of his college in that year. He was chosen Bampton lecturer in 1785 and appointed Whitehall preacher by Bishop Beilby Porteus in 1788. He was presented to the college rectory of Middleton Cheney, Northamptonshire, in 1792; and collated to the archdeaconry of St David's, by Bishop Burgess, on 18 September 1805. He died at Middleton Cheney on 28 March 1831.

== Works ==
Besides some detached sermons and lesser controversial works, he wrote:

- Eight Sermons on the Prophecies respecting the Destruction of Jerusalem, preached before the university of Oxford in 1785, at the lecture founded by John Bampton. Oxford, 1785.
- A memoir of Thomas Townson, D.D., archdeacon of Richmond, and rector of Malpas, Cheshire, prefixed to A Discourse on the Evangelical History from the Interment to the Ascension published after Dr. Townson's death by Dr. John Loveday, Oxford, 1793.
- A Letter to the Bishop of Worcester [Dr. Hurd], occasioned by his strictures on Archbishop Secker and Bishop Lowth, in his Life of Bishop Warburton. Oxford, 1796.
- The Lives of William Smyth, Bishop of Lincoln, and Sir Richard Sutton, knight, founders of Brazen Nose College. Oxford, 1800. To this work a supplement was published in 1803.
- The Life of Alexander Nowell, Dean of St. Paul's; chiefly compiled from registers, letters, and other authentic evidences. Oxford, 1809.
- "A memoir of Dr. Richard Chandler", prefixed to a new edition of his Travels in Asia Minor and Greece. 2 vols. 1825.

== Family ==
He married in 1796 Mary Calcot of Stene in Northamptonshire, and had eight children, of whom only four survived him. His second and third sons were the writers Edward Churton (father of Rev. William Ralph Churton the younger 1837-1897), and Rev. William Ralph Churton the elder (1802-1828).
