= William Ralph Churton =

Rev. William Ralph Churton, D.D. (1837–1897) was an Anglican churchman and author.

== Life ==
William Ralph Churton was the son of Edward Churton and should be distinguished from his uncle Rev. William Ralph Churton (8 Sep 1802 d. 29 Aug 1828) son of Ralph Churton. He was educated at Eton and King's College, Cambridge.

Churton wrote on the Septuagint (1861). His edition of the Uncanonical and Apocryphal Scriptures was the first to include a translation of the Bensly fragment (2 Esdras 7:36-105), Psalm 151 and Third and Fourth Maccabees.

== Works ==
- The Influence of the Septuagint Version of The Old Testament upon the Progress of Christianity. By the Rev. William Ralph Churton, BA, Fellow of King's College. 12mo. Cambridge: Macmillan and Co. 1861
- The Uncanonical and Apocryphal Scriptures: Being the Additions to the Old Testament Canon Which Were Included in the Ancient Greek and Latin Versions; the English Text of the Authorised Version Together with the Additional Matter Found in the Vulgate and Other Ancient Versions (London: J.Whitaker, 1884)
