= Charles Page Eden =

English Anglican priest and author (1807–1885)

Charles Page Eden (1807–1885) was an English clerical author and editor, associated with the Tractarians.

== Life ==
Born in or near Bristol, he was third son of Thomas Eden, curate of St. George's, Bristol, who died when Charles was an infant, leaving a widow and young family in poverty. Charles was educated at a day school in Bristol, and at the Liverpool Royal Institution School. Afterwards he was a teacher for a time in a private school run by his cousin, the Rev. J. Prince, and at Michaelmas 1825 went to Oriel College, Oxford as a Bible clerk appointed by the Provost, Edward Copleston. He proceeded B.A. with a first class in classics in 1829; in the two following years gained the prizes for the Ellerton theological essay and the chancellor's English essay, the latter named "On the Use and Abuse of Theory". In 1832, after two failures, he was elected a Fellow of his college.

After Eden's ordination (deacon 1833 and priest 1834), he held several university and college offices, and in 1843 succeeded John Henry Newman as vicar of the University Church of St Mary the Virgin. In 1850 he was presented by his college to the vicarage of Aberford, near Leeds, where in 1852 he married Miss Landon, a daughter of his predecessor, and where he remained for the rest of his life in 1885. He was elected proctor three times in the convocation of the province of York (1869–74–80) and in 1870 was preferred by the archbishop to the prebendal stall of Riccall. He was popularly called Canon Eden. He died 14 December 1885.

== Works ==
Eden's reputation was made by his editions (for the Library of Anglo-Catholic Theology) of Peter Gunning on the Paschal or Lent Fast, 1845, and of Lancelot Andrewes's Pattern of Catechistical Doctrine, 1846; and also an edition of Jeremy Taylor's Works, in 10 vols. This he began while he was at Oxford, and he finished vols. ii–viii. before he left the university in 1850; vols. ix. and x. were then published by Rev. Alexander Taylor, who had previously assisted him; and Eden finished the work by the publication in 1854 of the first volume, containing Reginald Heber's Life of Jeremy Taylor. The text of this edition is careful; a number of references unnoticed by Heber were added; it also includes two short pieces not found in Heber's edition, and omits three taken to be spurious.

In 1855 Eden published a volume of sixteen Sermons preached at St. Mary's in Oxford, the first of which had been privately printed in 1840 under the title of Early Prayer. He contributed to the Tracts for the Times, No. 32, On the standing ordinances of religion, but was never a prominent member of the Tractarians, though in his theological opinions he was close to them.
