= Edward Churton =

British churchman and scholar

Edward Churton (26 January 1800 – July 1874) was an English churchman and Spanish scholar.

== Life ==
He was born on 26 January 1800 at Middleton Cheney, Northamptonshire, the second son of Ralph Churton, archdeacon of St David's. He was educated at Charterhouse School and Christ Church, Oxford, where he proceeded B.A. 1821, and M.A. 1824. After taking his degree he returned to his old school, and was for a few years an assistant-master under Dr. Russell.

In 1830 Churton left Charterhouse to become curate to the rector of Hackney, London, John James Watson, afterwards his father-in-law; and for a short period he was headmaster of the church of England school at Hackney. In 1834 Archbishop William Howley gave him the living of Monks-eleigh in Suffolk, and eighteen months later Bishop William Van Mildert bestowed on him the rectory of Crayke.

Churton left Oxford before the tractarian movement arose, but was largely in sympathy with it; he was one of the 543 members of Convocation who thanked the proctors for their attitude with regard to the proposed condemnation of Tract XC. He remained at Crayke till his death. In 1841 Archbishop Edward Venables-Vernon-Harcourt appointed him to the stall of Knaresborough in York Minster, and in 1846 made him archdeacon of Cleveland.

Following the death of his younger brother Rev. William Ralph Churton (8 September 1802 - 29 August 1828), he named his son William Ralph Churton the younger (1837–1897).

== Works ==
In the Library of Anglo-Catholic Theology he edited John Pearson's minor theological writings, and also one of the Vindiciæ Ignatianæ, with a Latin preface defending in a scholarly fashion the genuineness of the Ignatian epistles against modern critics. He was a contributor to the British Critic, and when James Burns brought out The Englishman's Library, Churton and his friend William Gresley were the editors, and Churton contributed a volume on The Early English Church. His views on church matters were seen in his biography of Joshua Watson.

In 1848 he printed A Letter to Joshua Watson, Esq., in which he established that the Contemplations on the State of Man published in 1684 as a work of Jeremy Taylor's was in reality a rifacimento of the English translation (1672) by Sir Vivian Mullineaux of the treatise by Juan Eusebio Nieremberg, a Spanish Jesuit, called Diferencia de lo Temporal y Eterno. For the amusement of his children he translated three plays of Pedro Calderón de la Barca and Juan Pérez de Montalván, as well as a number of ballads. He, however, visited Spain just once, in 1861, and did not get further than the Basque provinces. A paper called A Traveller's Notes on the Basque Churches, printed in the sixth volume of the reports of the Yorkshire Architectural Society, was the result of this tour.

His major work in Spanish studies was Gongora, an Historical and Critical Essay on the Times of Philip III and IV of Spain, with Translations, 1862. Like John Bowle's edition of Don Quixote, it was composed in a country parsonage. It is accompanied by a series of translations not only from Góngora, but also from Herrera, Villamediana, Luis de León, Calderon, and Cervantes.

After Churton's death in July 1874, a volume of Poetical Remains was published (1876) by his daughter, containing, besides a number of original poems, versions from Spanish poets and also some from Anglo-Saxon.

A distinct evolution seems perceptible in Churton's work, from the structured theological and philosophical preoccupation of his early work, towards the rather more sentimental, national and poetic work of later years.
