= Bishop of Nassau and the Bahamas =

The Bishop of Nassau was an episcopal title given to the Ordinary of the Anglican Diocese of Nassau, from its formation in 1861 until it was retitled the Diocese of Nassau and The Bahamas in 1942.

== See also ==
- Diocese of The Bahamas and the Turks and Caicos Islands
