= Archdeacon of Rochdale =

Church of England ecclesiastical office

The Archdeacon of Rochdale is a senior ecclesiastical officer within the Diocese of Manchester.

As Archdeacon, they are responsible for the disciplinary supervision of the clergy within the five area deaneries: Ashton-under-Lyne, Heywood and Middleton, Rochdale, Oldham East and Oldham West.

Created on 3 June 1910 from the Manchester archdeaconry, the post is currently vacant.

== List of archdeacons ==
- 1910–1919 (ret.): Arthur Clarke
- 1919–1935 (ret.): Thomas Sale (afterwards archdeacon emeritus)
- 1935–20 December 1950 (d.): Albert Gaskell
- 1951–1962 (ret.): Edgar Stephenson (afterwards archdeacon emeritus)
- 1962–1966 (res.): Len Tyler
- 1966–1972 (res.): Arthur Ballard (became Archdeacon of Manchester)
- 1972–1982 (ret.): Harold Fielding (afterwards archdeacon emeritus)
- 1982–1991 (res.): David Bonser (became Bishop suffragan of Bolton)
- 1991–2000 (res.): Mark Dalby (afterwards archdeacon emeritus)
- 2000–2005 (res.): Andrew Ballard (became Archdeacon of Manchester)
- 2006–2008 (res.): Mark Davies (became Bishop suffragan of Middleton)
- 2008 – 5 January 2020 (res.): Cherry Vann (became Bishop of Monmouth)
- 1 July 2020 – 31 March 2024 (retired): David Sharples (previously Archdeacon of Salford)
- 15 September 2024 – present: Karen Smeeton
