= Harold Fielding (priest) =

English Anglican priest

The Venerable Harold Fielding MA
- Archdeacon of Rochdale
- Church: Church of England
- Province: York
- Diocese: Manchester
- In office: 1972–1982
- Predecessor: Arthur Henry Ballard
- Successor: David Bonser
- Other post: Vicar of St Peter's Church, Bolton (1965–1982)

Personal details
- Born: Harold Ormandy Fielding; 13 November 1912
- Died: 30 August 1987 (aged 74)
- Denomination: Anglican
- Spouse: Elsie Whillance
- Children: 3 sons and 1 daughter
- Education: Farnworth Grammar School; Magdalene College, Cambridge

Harold Ormandy Fielding (13 November 1912 – 30 August 1987) was an Anglican priest who served as Archdeacon of Rochdale from 1972 to 1982.

Born in 1912, the son of Harold W. Fielding and Florence Fielding (née Ormandy), he was educated at Farnworth Grammar School and Magdalene College, Cambridge, and then trained for the Anglican ministry at Ripon College Cuddesdon. Fielding married to Elsie Whillance at St James' Church, Farnworth in 1939. They had four children: Timothy, Robert, Catherine, and John. After curacies at St Mary's, Leigh and St Paul's, Walkden, he was Vicar of St James', New Bury from 1944 to 1965. Fielding was then Vicar of St Peter's, Bolton from 1965 to 1982, during which time he also became Archdeacon of Rochdale. After his retirement, he lived in Bromley Cross, a suburb in the Metropolitan Borough of Bolton. He published a book in 1983 about James Slade, Vicar of St Peter's, Bolton, one of Fielding's 19th-century predecessors. He died on 30 August 1987, aged 74.

Church of England titles
Preceded by Richard Greville Norburn	Vicar of St Peter's, Bolton; 1965–1982	Succeeded by Alfred Christopher Hall
Preceded by Arthur Henry Ballard	Archdeacon of Rochdale; 1972–1982	Succeeded by David Bonser
