= Eltham College =

Coordinates: 51.438°N 0.039°E

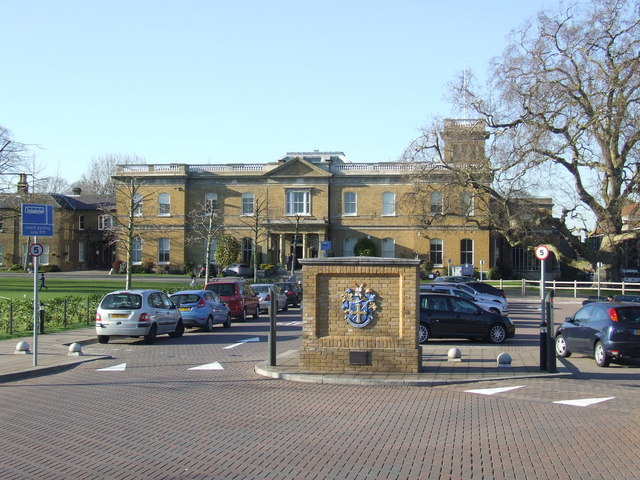
- School entrance and main building

Location
- Grove Park Road; Mottingham, London, SE9 4QF; England

Information
- Type: Private day school
- Motto: Gloria Filiorum Patres ("The fathers are the glory of the sons" – Proverbs 17: 6)
- Established: 1842; 184 years ago
- Local authority: Bromley
- Department for Education URN: 101693 Tables
- Headmaster: Guy Sanderson
- Gender: Co-educational
- Age: 7 to 18
- Enrolment: 1065
- Houses: Carey; Chalmers; Livingstone; Moffat
- Alumni: Old Elthamians
- Website: www.eltham-college.org.uk

Eltham College is a private day school situated in Mottingham, southeast London. Eltham and Mottingham once formed part of the same parish, hence its name. It is a member of The Headmasters' and Headmistresses' Conference (HMC).

== Early history ==
The school dates back to the early Victorian era, when it was founded as the London Missionary Society's School for the Sons and Orphans of Missionaries. Within a short time the Baptist Missionary Society joined as co-founders. A girls' school had been established in Walthamstow in 1838 by Dorothea Foulger and a boys' school was opened there in early 1842. The boys' school later relocated to Mornington Crescent in 1852 and then to a purpose-built location in the centre of Blackheath in 1857 (the building, directly adjacent to the south side of Blackheath Station, later became the headquarters of the Church Army and is now a private hospital). Missionary David Livingstone sent his son Robert to the school during the 1850s.

== Current site ==
The school moved to its present site – centred on an 18th-century mansion (Fairy Hall) in Mottingham – in 1912. The building had previously been used by the Royal Naval School from 1889 to the end of the summer term in 1910.

Eltham College began life as a small boarding school catering for children of missionaries serving overseas, mainly in India, China and Africa. From 1945 to 1976 Eltham was a Direct Grant school; thus, for example, the 1952 intake was roughly 20 pupils from London County Council schools and 20 from Kent schools (all 40 of these on scholarships), and 20 fee-payers. When the Direct Grant system was abolished in 1976, the school chose to go fully independent. After the 1950s the number of missionary sons fell sharply and the school became primarily a day school for boys until it went fully co-educational in the 2020s. The sixth form has admitted girls since 1978. Reflecting the origins of the school, each of the four houses is named after a prominent LMS or BMS missionary, namely Carey, Livingstone, Chalmers and Moffat; coloured blue, green, red and yellow respectively.

=== 21st century developments ===
Headmaster (2000–2014) Paul Henderson continued a programme of building and development started by Christopher Waller, including major refurbishments to the junior school and music school, and a car park in front of the college. The Gerald Moore Art Gallery (partly funded by and named after artist Gerald Moore, an Old Elthamian) opened in 2012, displaying works by Moore, students and other artists.

Also in 2012, to mark the centenary of the move to Mottingham, the college launched a campaign to raise the funds to replace the Sixth Form Centre and Jubilee Block. Construction began in July 2017 and ended in February 2019. The new Turberville building (named after Geoffrey Turberville, the college's longest serving headmaster, 1930–1959) is located on the west side of the Old Quad with a new colonnade linking it to existing buildings. A triple-height, glazed atrium forms a link between the quad and the playing fields to the east and gives access to the David Robins Sixth Form Centre.

Girls were admitted to Year 3 and Year 7 for the first time in autumn 2020 (since the late 1970s girls have been members of the sixth form). Thus Eltham College became fully co-educational in every year from autumn 2024.

== Sexual abuse allegations ==
As of June 2021, a newspaper article reported that former students who had collected testimonials about alleged incidents between 2016 and 2021 received letters from the school's solicitors requesting them to desist, or provide evidence. The school said: "Safeguarding remains our top priority, and we want to do everything we can to make our pupils feel safe and fully supported. We have very strong pastoral procedures and reporting systems in place, and these are kept under regular review to ensure they remain fully fit for purpose".

One substantiated case was Andrew Hillary, a teacher in the Design and Technology Department in the 1990s and 2000s, who was prohibited from teaching indefinitely by a Professional Conduct Panel and the Secretary of State on 8 April 2013 following discovery of 100,000 indecent images of children.

== Teacher-assessed grades in 2021 ==
In February 2022, the Sunday Times investigated the use of teacher assessed grades given to pupils at independent schools across the UK in 2021. These had replaced the formal exams that were cancelled due to the COVID-19 pandemic. For Eltham College, in 2021, 72.2% of its A-level entries got A* grades, whereas in 2019 the figure was only 29.1%. In 2022, the figure was lower at 44%.

== Headmasters ==
=== Blackheath ===
The school's headmasters at Blackheath were:

- 1852–1866: William George Lemon
- 1866–1868: James Scott
- 1869–1870: Charles Dugard Makepeace
- 1870–1875: Edward J Chinnock
- 1875–1892: Edward Waite
- 1893–1914: Walter Brainerd Hayward (he brought the school to Mottingham in 1912)

=== Mottingham ===
- 1914–1926: George Robertson
- 1926–1930: Nevil Wood
- 1930–1959: Geoffrey Turberville
- 1959–1983: Christopher Porteous
- 1983–1990: Christopher Waller
- 1990–2000: Malcolm Green
- 2000–2014: Paul Henderson
- 2014–present: Guy Sanderson

== Notable alumni ==
- Sir John Adams, physicist, director of CERN
- Sir John Bailey, Procurator General and Treasury Solicitor
- Philip Bailey, cricket statistician
- Stuart Ball, political historian
- George Band, mountaineer
- Nicholas Barberis, professor of finance
- Piers Benn, philosopher
- Andrew Percy Bennett, diplomat
- Kevin Bonavia, politician
- Anthony Bottoms, criminologist
- Fenner Brockway, peace campaigner
- Tony Brise, racing driver
- Michael Buckley, civil servant
- Nabil Al Busaidi, adventurer
- Charlie Connelly, author and broadcaster
- Stephen Dunnett, neuroscientist
- Mike Exeter, sound engineer and producer
- Ernest Fahmy, obstetrician and gynaecologist
- Frank Farmer, physicist
- Stephen Farr, organist
- Nick Ferrari, radio broadcaster
- Freddie Foster, cricketer
- Simon Gass, Ambassador to Greece 2004–2009, Ambassador to Iran 2009–11
- Barry Hammett, Royal Navy chaplain
- Brian Harris (priest)
- James Harris, Welsh rugby union player
- Richard Hart, cricketer
- Christopher Idle, Anglican priest and hymn writer
- David E. H. Jones, chemist and writer
- Jim Knight, former Labour MP, Minister of State for Schools in the UK Government, MP from 2001 to 2010 for South Dorset
- Barnaby Lenon, headmaster of Harrow School and academic
- Eric Liddell, Olympic athlete and missionary, after whom the sports centre is named
- Peter Luff, campaigner
- Johan Malcolm, Leicestershire county cricket player
- Alan Martin, Professor of Theoretical Physics
- Gerald Moore, surgeon and artist
- Adrian Nance, Royal Navy officer
- Jack Oliver, weightlifter
- Phil Packer MBE, soldier and fundraiser
- Mervyn Peake, author of Gormenghast, after whom the library is named
- Thomas Ernest Pearce, sportsman and member of the Legislative Council of Hong Kong
- Geoffrey K. Pullum, Professor of General Linguistics since 2007 at the University of Edinburgh
- David Sanger, organist
- Michael Saward, Anglican priest and hymn writer
- Andrew Sentance, Member of the Bank of England Monetary Policy Committee from 2006 to 2011, and Chief Economist of British Airways from 1998 to 2006
- Gerald Summers, furniture designer
- Bryan Sykes, human geneticist
- Alan Wolstencroft, Archdeacon of Manchester

== Arms ==
Coat of arms of Eltham College
Crest On a wreath of the colours in front of two torches in saltire Or enflamed Proper an open book also Proper. Escutcheon Azure two pilgrims' staves in saltire Argent surmounted by a cross flory Or. Motto Gloria Filiorum Patres
