= Brian Harris (priest) =

The Ven Reginald Brian Harris (born 14 August 1934) is a British Anglican clergyman who was the Archdeacon of Manchester from 1980 to 1998.

Harris was educated at Eltham College and Christ's College, Cambridge After curacies in Wednesbury and Uttoxeter he held incumbencies in Bury and Bolton. He was the Rural Dean of Walmsley from 1970 to 1980; and a Canon Residentiary at Manchester Cathedral from 1980 until 1998.

Church of England titles
Preceded by Arthur Henry Ballard	Archdeacon of Manchester; 1980–1998	Succeeded by Alan Wolstencroft
