= Big D =

Big D may refer to:

== People ==
- Don Drysdale (1936–1993), Major League Baseball pitcher
- Bigg D (born 1972), record producer from Miami, Florida
- Big D (drag king), American drag king
- David Adeleye, British Boxer
- Devendra Fadnavis (born 1970), Chief Minister of Maharashtra, India

== Fiction ==
- Dudley Dursley, a character in J. K. Rowling's Harry Potter novels
- Damn (spelled damme), referred to euphemistically in Gilbert and Sullivan's H.M.S. Pinafore
- A character in the 2005 Chinese film Election
- A character in the 1966 animated series The Impossibles

== Music ==
- Big D and the Kids Table, an American ska band
- "Big D" (song), a song in Frank Loesser's 1956 Broadway musical The Most Happy Fella

== Radio ==
- "Big D 103", a former moniker of WDRC-FM in Hartford, Connecticut
- Big D Jamboree, an American country music radio show
- Big D and Bubba, an American radio show

== Other uses ==
- Divorce
- Dallas, Texas, eighth-largest city in the United States
- Big D (peanuts), British brand of snack foods
- The original name of the Dallas Cowboys mascot Rowdy
- Part of the National Supermarkets chain

== See also ==
- D (disambiguation)
