= Breightmet =

Coordinates: 53.581°N 2.386°W

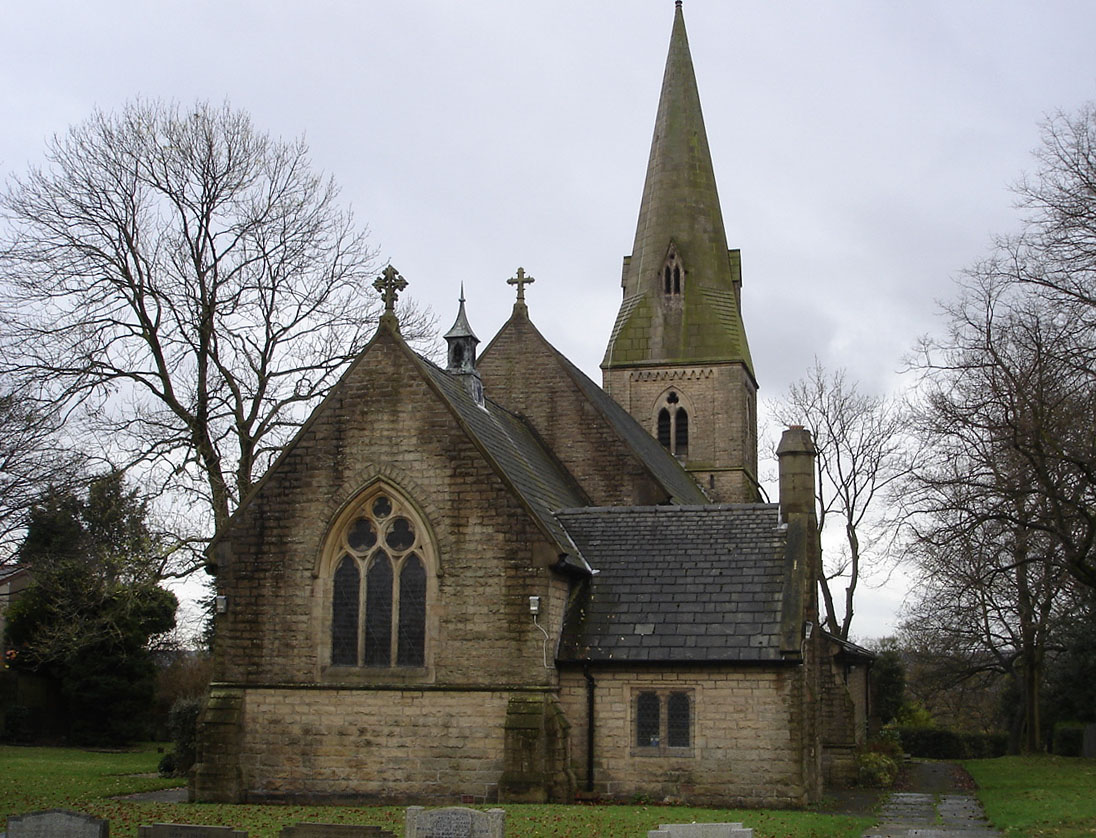
- St James Church

- Location within Greater Manchester
- Population: 13,584 (2011.ward)
- OS grid reference: SD745095
- Metropolitan borough: Bolton
- Metropolitan county: Greater Manchester
- Region: North West
- Country: England
- Sovereign state: United Kingdom
- Post town: BOLTON
- Postcode district: BL2
- Dialling code: 01204
- Police: Greater Manchester
- Fire: Greater Manchester
- Ambulance: North West
- UK Parliament: Bolton North East

Breightmet /ˈbreɪtmət/ is a neighbourhood of Bolton, Greater Manchester, England. The population at the 2011 census was 13,584. Historically a township of the civil and ecclesiastical parish of Bolton le Moors in the Salford hundred of Lancashire, it lies 2 miles (3.2 km) north-east of Bolton and 4 miles (6.4 km) north-west of Bury.

== History ==
=== Toponymy ===
The name is from Old English breorht (bright) and maed (meadow). It was recorded variously as Brihtmede (1257), Brightemete (1277), Breghmete and Breghtmed (1292), Brithmete (1302), Brightmede (1510) and Breightmet (1574).

=== Manor ===
The manor originated as part of the Marsey fee and one ploughland was held by Augustin de Breightmet in the 12th century. By marriage, one part descended to the Southworths of Samlesbury, who held it until the 16th century. This portion was later owned by Gerards, Ainsworths, Banastres, Baguley and Parker families. The other part was held by the Hollands until they forfeited it in 1461, when it was granted to Lord Stanley and his son, Lord Strange, the Earls of Derby.

=== Industry ===
In the township there was a quarry and several collieries, including one accessing a seam of coal 3 yards (2.7 m) thick. There were handloom weavers producing quilts and counterpanes. Two cotton mills and a bleachworks were built.

== Governance ==
In 1837 Breightmet became part of the Bolton Poor Law Union, which took responsibility for funding the Poor Law in that area. Breightmet was formerly a township in the parish of Bolton-le-Moors, in 1866 Breightmet became a separate civil parish, on 30 September 1898 the parish was abolished and merged with Bolton and Breightmet became part of the County Borough of Bolton. In 1891 the parish had a population of 1720. Following the Local Government Act 1972, the County Borough of Bolton was abolished and Breightmet became part of the Metropolitan Borough of Bolton in Greater Manchester in 1974. It is represented by three councillors on Bolton Council and is part of the Bolton North-East Westminster constituency.

== Geography ==
The Breightmet township, which covered 825 acres (3.34 km^{2}) acres of hilly land was two miles north east of Bolton on Bury road. It was separated from Tonge with Haulgh by the Bradshaw Brook. Breightmet Hill, the highest point, rises to about 525 feet (160 m). There is a local nature reserve at Seven Acres Country Park. The park separates the west side of Breightmet from neighbouring Tonge Moor.

== Religion ==
There are several places of worship in Breightmet including two Anglican churches, St James and St John the Evangelist, St Osmund's Roman Catholic church, Red Lane United Reformed Church and the independent Kings Church Bolton, Unit 1, Millfield Rd, Boundary Industrial Estate.

St James' parish church designed by John Edgar Gregan was consecrated in 1855. Canon James Slade, Vicar of Bolton from 1817 to 1856, and founder of the Bolton Church Institute is buried in the churchyard.

== Sport and leisure ==
Bolton St Catherine's Academy has a community leisure and sports centre. Leverhulme Park, the largest park area within Bolton has a community and children's centre with therapy suites, gymnasium, indoor athletics hall and outdoor athletics stadium, which hosts the town's school athletics competitions. The park has football pitches, 5-a-side football pitches, bowling greens and an athletics stadium as well as nature walks and picnic areas. The park is also home to the Bolton Parkrun.

== Education ==
Bolton St Catherine's Academy caters for children from three to 19. It is a Church of England school incorporating the former Withins School, a secondary school and Top o'th Brow Primary School.

Four other primary schools serve Breightmet. These are Red Lane County Primary School, Leverhulme Community Primary School, Blackshaw County Primary School, and St. Osmund and Andrew Roman Catholic County Primary School.

== Notable residents ==
Badly Drawn Boy (real name Damon Gough), indie singer-songwriter, grew up in Breightmet

== Notable events ==
Rock and roll singer Johnny Kidd died at age 30 in a car collision on the A58, Bury New Road, in Breightmet, around 2 a.m. on 8 October 1966.
