= Freddie Foster =

English cricketer

Personal information
- Full name: Frederick James H. Foster
- Born: December 1995 (age 30); Westminster, London, England
- Batting: Left-handed
- Bowling: Slow left-arm orthodox

Domestic team information
- Years: Team
- 2019: Oxford University

Career statistics
Competition	First-class
Matches	1
Runs scored	1
Batting average	1.00
100s/50s	–/–
Top score	1
Balls bowled	228
Wickets	3
Bowling average	26.66
5 wickets in innings	–
10 wickets in match	–
Best bowling	2/36
Catches/stumpings	1/–
- Source: Cricinfo, 19 May 2020

Frederick James H. Foster (born December 1995) is an English first-class cricketer.

Foster was born in Westminster and educated at Eltham College and Durham University. From Durham he progressed to study for a PhD in chemistry at St Cross College, Oxford. While studying at Oxford, he made a single appearance for Oxford University against Cambridge University in The University Matches of 2019 at Fenner's. Foster took three wickets in the match with his slow left-arm orthodox bowling, taking the wickets of Nathan Johns in the Cambridge first innings, in addition to Nick Taylor and Edward Hyde in their second-innings, finishing with match figures of 3 for 80. He batted once in the Oxford innings, scoring a single run before being run out by James Vitali.
