= Andrew Ballard =

British Archdeacon (born 1944)

Andrew Edgar Ballard (born 14 January 1944) is an Anglican priest. He was Archdeacon of Rochdale from 2000 to 2005; and Archdeacon of Manchester from 2005 to 2009.

He was educated at Rossall School, St John's College, Durham and Westcott House, Cambridge. He was ordained in 1969. After curacies at St Mary's, Bryanston Square and St Mary's Portsea, the largest parish in that city, he held incumbencies in Haslingden, Walkden, Little Hulton and Farnworth before his appointment as Archdeacon.

His father was also Archdeacon of Rochdale, from 1966 to 1972.

Church of England titles
Preceded by John Mark Meredith Dalby	Archdeacon of Rochdale; 2000–2005	Succeeded by Mark Davies
Preceded by Alan Wolstencroft	Archdeacon of Manchester; 2005–2009	Succeeded by Mark David Ashcroft
