= Foster Blackburne =

Foster Grey Blackburne, MA (Prestwich, 3 December 1838 – 1 February 1909) was Archdeacon of Manchester from 1905 until his death.

He was educated at Marlborough and Brasenose College, Oxford and ordained in 1863. He began his ecclesiastical career with curacies in Bebbington and Chester. After this he was Rector of Nantwich from 1872 to 1894; and then of Bury from 1894 until his death.

Church of England titles
Preceded by James Wilson	Archdeacon of Manchester; 1905–1909	Succeeded by John Wright
