= David Gillett =

British Anglican bishop (born 1945)

The Right Reverend David Gillett
- Bishop of Bolton
- Church: Church of England
- Diocese: Diocese of Manchester
- In office: 1999–2008
- Predecessor: David Bonser
- Successor: Chris Edmondson
- Other posts: Honorary assistant bishop (2008–present) and Interfaith Advisor (2010–present) in Norwich; Principal of Trinity College, Bristol (1988–1999)

Orders
- Ordination: 1968 (deacon); 1969 (priest)
- Consecration: 1999 by David Hope

Personal details
- Born: 25 January 1945 (age 81)
- Denomination: Anglican
- Parents: Norman & Kathleen
- Spouse: Valerie (m. 1988–2013)
- Occupation: Academic (theologian)
- Education: University of Leeds

David Keith Gillett (born 25 January 1945) is a British Anglican bishop. From 1988 to 1999, he was Principal of Trinity College, Bristol, an Anglican theological college. From 1999 to 2008, he was the Bishop of Bolton, a suffragan bishop in the Diocese of Manchester. Since 2008, he has been an honorary assistant bishop and Diocesan Interfaith Adviser in the Diocese of Norwich.

== Early life ==
Gillett was educated at Wellingborough Grammar School in Wellingborough, Northamptonshire. He studied for a BA and an MPhil at Leeds University. From 1966 to 1968, he undertook study and training for ordination at Oak Hill College, an evangelical theological college in London.

== Ordained ministry ==
Gillett was ordained in the Church of England as a deacon in 1968 and as a priest in 1969. He began his ecclesiastical career with a curacy in Watford.

From 1971 he was Northern Travelling Secretary of Pathfinders and the Church Youth Fellowships Association CYFA, an organisation that supports Christian teenagers. After a spell as Lecturer and first Director of Extension Studies at St John's College, Nottingham he became one of the leaders at the Christian Renewal Centre in Northern Ireland working for reconciliation in Northern Ireland at the height of the troubles in the late 1970s/early '80s. He then served an Incumbency at Lewsey in Luton. He was appointed Principal of Trinity College, Bristol in 1988. His main specialisms are in the area of ministerial training, Old Testament studies, spirituality and interfaith relations.

In 1999, he was consecrated a bishop by David Hope. He then served as Bishop of Bolton, a suffragan bishop of the Diocese of Manchester. From 2006 to 2008 he was the first Chair of the national Christian Muslim Forum. A keen photographer and gardener, he retired in 2008. He then became an honorary asst. bishop and Interfaith Adviser in the Diocese of Norwich. In 2010 he was appointed a member of the Advisory Board of the Council of Christians and Jews and elected Chair of Norwich Interfaith Link.

=== Views ===
Gillett belongs to the Open Evangelical tradition of the Church of England. He is a patron of Accepting Evangelicals, a group that champions an "acceptance of faithful, loving same-sex partnerships at every level of church life, and the development of a positive Christian ethic for LGBT people".

On 11 February 2017, Gillett was one of fourteen retired bishops to sign an open letter to the then-serving bishops of the Church of England. In an unprecedented move, they expressed their opposition to the House of Bishops' report to General Synod on sexuality, which recommended no change to the Church's canons or practises around sexuality. By 13 February, a serving bishop (Alan Wilson, Bishop of Buckingham) and nine further retired bishops had added their signatures; on 15 February, the report was rejected by synod.

Church of England titles
Preceded by David Bonser	Bishop of Bolton; 1999–2008	Succeeded by Chris Edmondson
