= Matthew Porter (bishop) =

British Anglican bishop

The Right Reverend Matthew Porter
- Bishop of Bolton
- Church: Church of England
- Province: Province of York
- Diocese: Diocese of Manchester
- In office: 2023-
- Predecessor: Mark Ashcroft
- Other post: Vicar of St Michael le Belfrey, York (2010–2023)

Orders
- Ordination: 1996 (deacon); 1997(priest) by David Hope
- Consecration: 22 June 2023 by Stephen Cottrell

Personal details
- Born: Matthew James Porter; 1969 (age 56–57)
- Denomination: Anglicanism
- Spouse: Sam
- Children: Five
- Education: University of Nottingham; University of Sheffield; Asbury Theological Seminary; Wycliffe Hall, Oxford

Matthew James Porter (born 1969) is an Anglican bishop. Since 2023, he has been the Bishop of Bolton.

== Education ==
Porter was educated at Oundle School, University of Nottingham, University of Sheffield, Asbury Theological Seminary and Wycliffe Hall, Oxford.

He has a Bachelors degree in History, and in Theology; a Masters Degree in Evangelism Studies and a Doctorate in Church Planting.

== Ordained ministry ==
Porter was ordained in the Church of England as a deacon in 1996 and as a priest in 1997. From 1996 to 2000, he served his curacy at Christ Church, Dore, in the Diocese of Sheffield. He was Vicar of Woodseats from 2000 to 2009; and of St Michael le Belfrey, York from 2010 to 2023. He was an Honorary Chaplain to the Monarch in 2022-23

=== Episcopal ministry ===
On 5 March 2023, it was announced that Porter would become the next Bishop of Bolton, a suffragan bishop in the Diocese of Manchester. He was consecrated a bishop on 22 June 2023 by Stephen Cottrell, Archbishop of York, during a service at York Minster.

As well as leading the See of Bolton covering much of the North and West of Greater Manchester, Porter is responsible for evangelism and church planting across the Diocese of Manchester. Since 2024, he has been Chair of The College of Archbishops' Evangelists, and is a Champion Bishop for Missionary Discipleship.

== Personal life ==
Porter is married to Sam: they have five sons.

== Emphases & Interests ==
In 2024, Bishop Matthew began #prayforpeacewednesday, an initiative encouraging people to take some time to pray for peace in war-torn parts of the world each Wednesday. Matthew Porter has blogged for many years in the fields of discipleship and leadership. He is an author, with recent books including:

A-Z of Discipleship (2017)

A-Z of Prayer (2019)

Overflow (2020)

The Art of Giving (2024)

The Art of Journalling (2024)

The Art of Fasting (2025)

Church of England titles
Preceded by Mark Ashcroft	Bishop of Bolton; 2023–	Incumbent
