= St Peter's Church, Bolton =

Anglican church in Greater Manchester, England

St Peter's Church
- The Parish Church of St Peter, Bolton-le-Moors
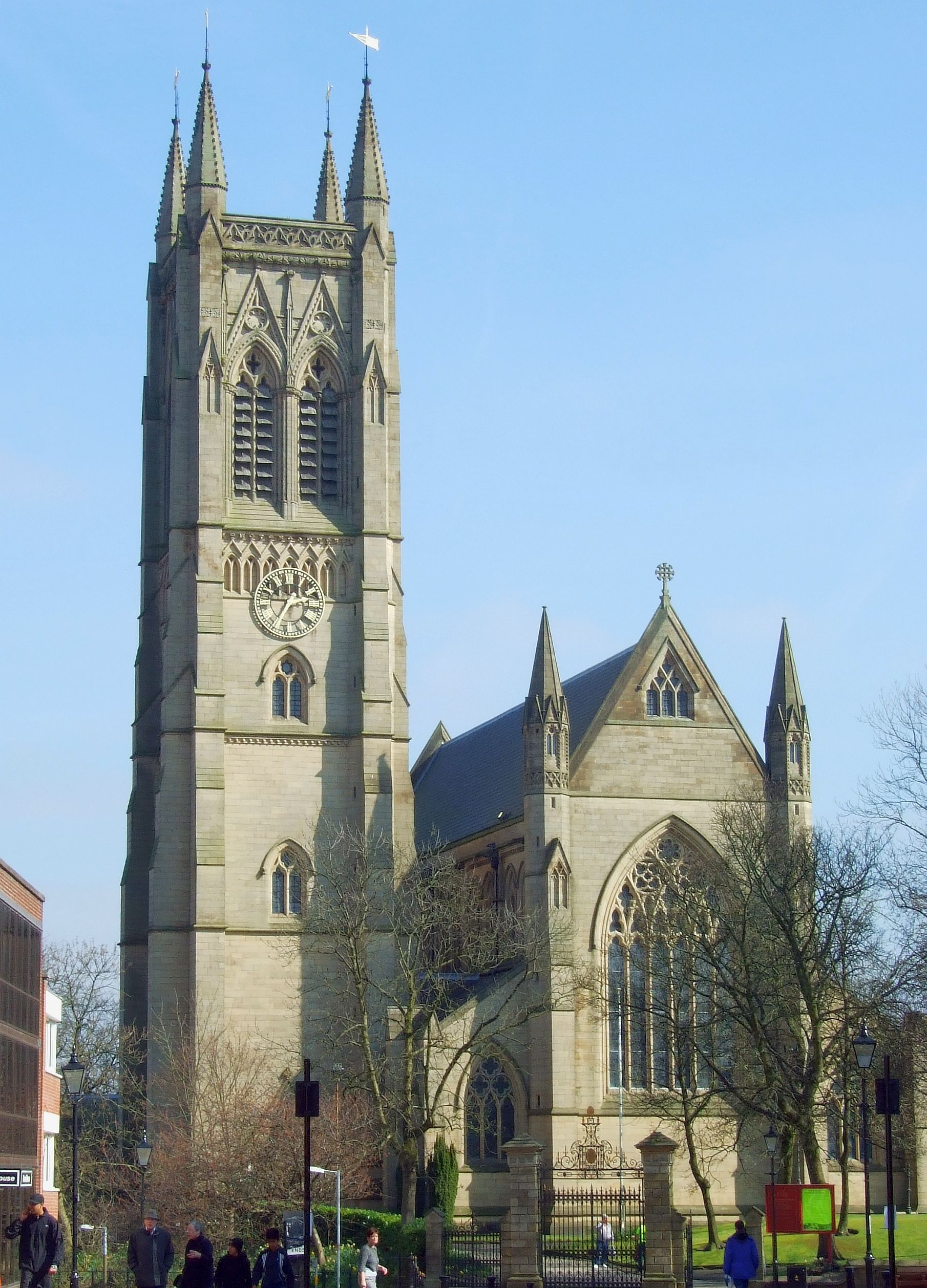
- St Peter's Church
- St Peter's Church
- 53.579°N 2.423°W
- OS grid reference: SD 72052 09288
- Location: Bolton
- Country: England
- Denomination: Church of England
- Churchmanship: Central churchmanship
- Website: boltonparishchurch.co.uk

History
- Status: Parish Church
- Founded: Anglo-Saxon origin
- Dedication: Saint Peter
- Consecrated: 29 June 1871

Architecture
- Functional status: Active
- Heritage designation: Grade II*
- Designated: 26 April 1974
- Architect: Edward Paley
- Style: Gothic Revival
- Completed: 1871
- Construction cost: £45,000

Specifications
- Length: 156 feet (48 m)
- Width: 67 feet (20 m)
- Height: Roof 82 feet (25 m); Tower 180 feet (55 m)
- Materials: Longridge stone

Administration
- Province: York
- Diocese: Manchester
- Archdeaconry: Bolton
- Deanery: Bolton
- Parish: Bolton-le-Moors

Clergy
- Vicar: Revd Hannah Lane (2024)

St Peter's Church, Bolton-le-Moors, commonly known as Bolton Parish Church, is a Church of England parish church in Bolton, Greater Manchester, England. The parish church, dedicated to St Peter, is an example of the Gothic Revival style. The church is recorded in the National Heritage List for England as a Grade II* listed building, having been designated in 1974. St Peter's is an active parish church in the Diocese of Manchester and is part of the Bolton deanery and Bolton archdeaconry.

== History ==
The church, on a hill overlooking the River Croal, is the fourth to be built on the site. Until the 1840s the ancient ecclesiastical parish of Bolton-le-Moors covered a large area and was divided into townships, some of which had chapels of ease. The modern parish covers the town centre and its immediate surroundings.

Demolition of the 15th-century church in 1866 revealed several pre-Norman stones under the tower, including a preaching cross in three pieces. Fragments of other crosses and stones from the 11th, 12th and 13th centuries, a sepulchral slab, stone coffin, and the remains of a 14th-century stone female figure, indicate that two earlier churches had existed on the same site, one Anglo Saxon and one Norman.

Little is known of the first two buildings, but the squat, 15th-century church which replaced the Norman structure had an embattled west tower, a chancel, nave, north and south aisles and a south porch which was rebuilt in 1694. Its east window had seven lights. The Chetham and Bradford Chapels occupied the east end of the aisles on either side of the chancel. Galleries were added in the 18th century and the aisle walls were raised and windows inserted to light them. Though the church was modified over the years, the population of Bolton expanded rapidly during the Industrial Revolution and the church, in a poor state of repair, became too small and was demolished. Fragments of stone and other artefacts from the first three buildings are displayed in the museum corner of the present church.

The present church, built between 1867 and 1871, was designed by the Lancaster architect E. G. Paley. It cost £47,000 (equivalent to £4,580,000 in 2025), and was paid for by Peter Ormrod, a local cotton spinner and banker, of Halliwell Hall.

== Structure ==
The church is 67 feet (20 m) wide, 156 feet (48 m) long, and 83 feet (25 m) in height. Its tower rises to 180 feet (55 m), making it the tallest church tower in the historic county of Lancashire.

== Exterior ==
The church, built in ashlar sandstone with slate roofs, has a nave with clerestory and north and south aisles, transepts, a chancel with a lady chapel and pipe organ chamber. On the south side of the south aisle is a gabled porch with a wrought-iron screen. The vestry, which was added later at its north east corner, is reminiscent of the chapter houses of pre-Reformation abbeys.

The four-stage tower projects from the west end of the north aisle and has clasping buttresses at each corner which terminate in crocketted finials. There are two-light decorated, lancet windows in the second and third stages, and paired bell-chamber lights at the fourth stage. Its west door is in a moulded archway with polished granite shafts. The door, designed by Hubert Austin, retains its original ornate hammered ironwork door furniture.

The church has a five-bay nave, divided by buttresses with lean-to aisles and a clerestory above. In each bay is a three-light decorated window with tracery. The clerestory has paired windows with ball flower decorations and gargoyles. There are traceried pinnacles at the east end of chancel. There is a seven-light east window in the chancel with lancet windows above it. The north transept has a seven-light window and there is a five-light decorated window in the south transept. The lady chapel to the east of the chancel has two two-light windows to south and a three-light east window.

=== Fittings and furnishings ===
The chancel and west end of the nave have encaustic tiled floors by Minton. The octagonal wood panelled pulpit wraps round the northern crossing pier, it has stone base and a wrought iron rail to the stairs. The nave seating, canopied civic stalls and choir stalls are original. Three misericords were saved from the 15th-century church.

Of the eight bells installed when the church opened, five were cast in 1699 by Henry Bagley of Ecton in Northamptonshire and three by Rudhall of Gloucester in 1806. The old bells were replaced by the bells from Saviours Church on Deane Road in 1974. Five new trebles were recast from the old bells by John Taylor & Co and the tenor bell was retained and hung "dead" and is rung electrically when required. The tenor bell is inscribed, "I to the Chvrch the living call And to the grave doe svmmon all Henry Bagley made mee 1699".

An organ built in 1795 was enlarged in 1852 and replaced in 1882 by a new one which reused some of the old pipes. The three-manual organ built by A. G. Hill in 1882, in a case decorated with stylised flowers and angels, was rebuilt in 2008 by Principal Pipe Organs of York. The organ has almost 3,000 internal pipes, the largest 16 feet long and the smallest half an inch.

== Vicars of Bolton-le-Moors ==
The following is a list of the vicars since the Reformation:

- 1560–1582: Edward Cockerell
- 1582–1593: Alexander Smythe
- 1594–1595: John Albright
- 1595–1598: Zacharias Saunders
- 1598–1625: Ellis Saunderson
- 1625–1630: Robert Parke
- 1630–1644: William Gregg
- 1644–1657: John Harpur
- 1657–1662: Richard Goodwin
- 1662–1671: Robert Harpur
- 1671–1673: Michael Stanford
- 1673–1691: John Lever
- 1691–1721: Peter Haddon
- 1721–1737: Thomas Morrall
- 1737–1789: Edward Whitehead
- 1789–1793: Jeremiah Gilpin
- 1793–1811: Thomas Bancroft
- 1811–1817: John Brocklebank
- 1817–1857: James Slade
- 1857–1886: Henry Powell
- 1887–1896: James Augustus Atkinson
- 1896–1901: Edwyn Hoskyns
- 1902–1909: Henry Henn
- 1909–1922: Thomas Alfred Chapman
- 1922–1930: Spencer Cecil Carpenter
- 1930–1933: Spencer Hayward Elliot
- 1933–1948: Walter John Havelock Davidson
- 1948–1965: Richard Greville Norburn
- 1965–1982: Harold Ormandy Fielding
- 1983–1990: Alfred Christopher Hall
- 1991–1998: Alan Wolstencroft
- 1999–2007: Michael Joseph Williams
- 2008–2017: Matthew Thompson
- 2018–2023: Christopher Andrew Bracegirdle
- 2024–: Hannah Lane

== Directors of Music ==
- William Lonsdale c. 1809–25
- Witton Thomas c. 1825–40
- John Fawcett, BMus 1840–57
- John Aspinall 1857–64
- Joseph Varey 1865
- John H. L. Glover 1865–67
- Miss S. Warbreck 1867–69
- William Best 1869–89
- Walter J. Lancaster, BMus, FRCO, LRAM 1889–1947
- George Fisher, BMus, FRCO, LRAM 1947–52
- Arthur M. Stanier, LRAM, ARCO 1952–56
- P. A. S. Stevens, BSc, BMus 1957–58
- William Morgan, BA, FRCO 1959–86
- Kevin Morgan, BA, PhD, FRCO, LRAM 1986–96
- Martin Bussey, MA 1996–2000
- Stephen H. Carleston, MA, FRCO (Chm) 2000–09
- Michael J. Pain, MA, FRCO, LRAM, ARCM 2009–2022
- Philip O'Connor, MMus, PGDip, ARCO 2023-

== Interior ==
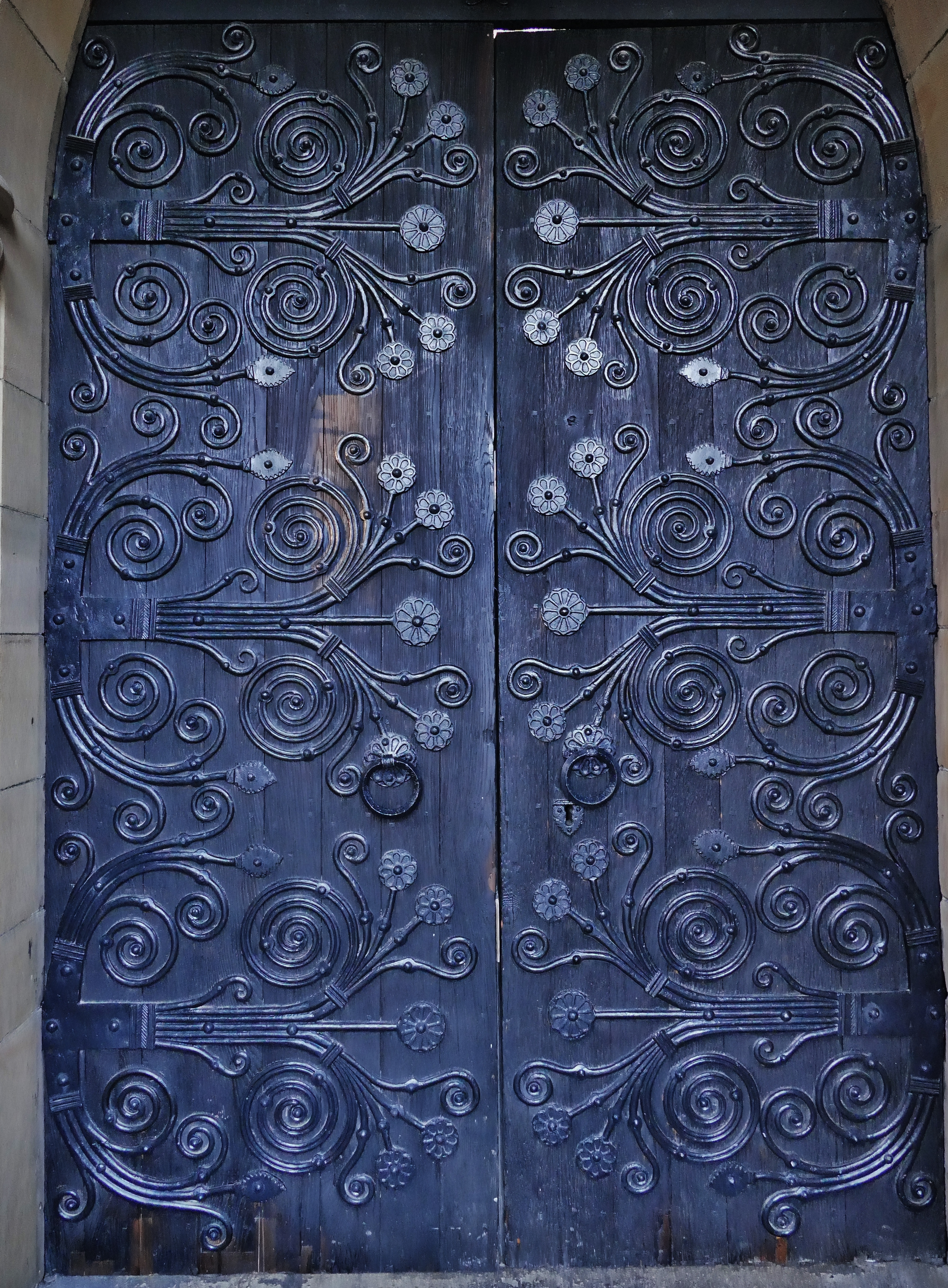
Main door

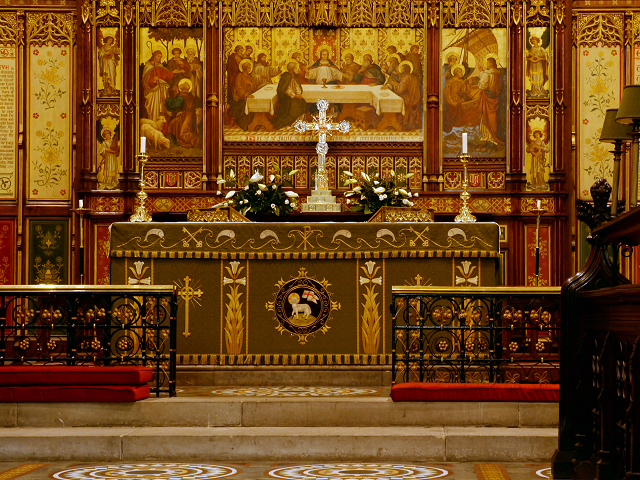
Altar

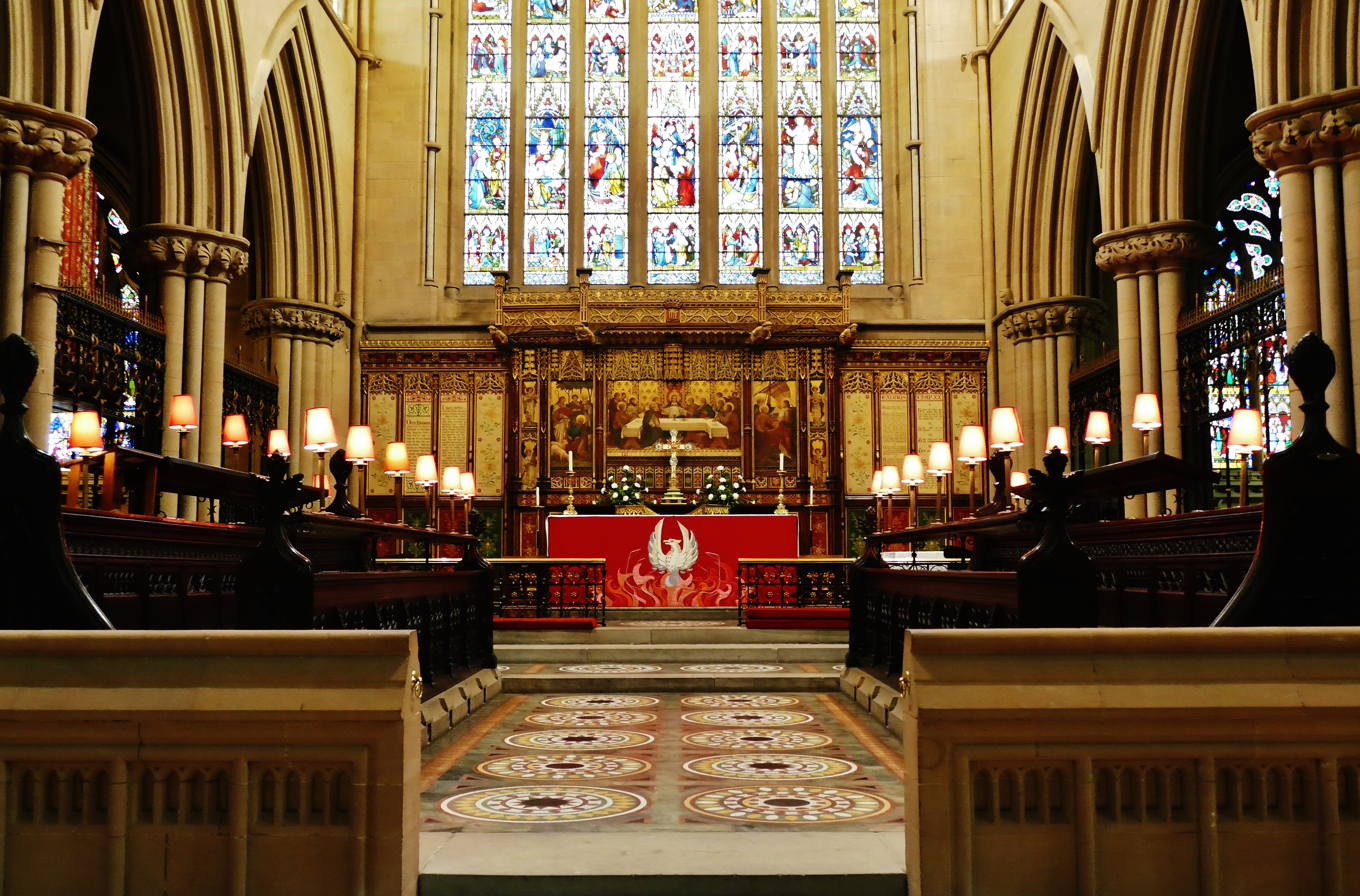
Chancel

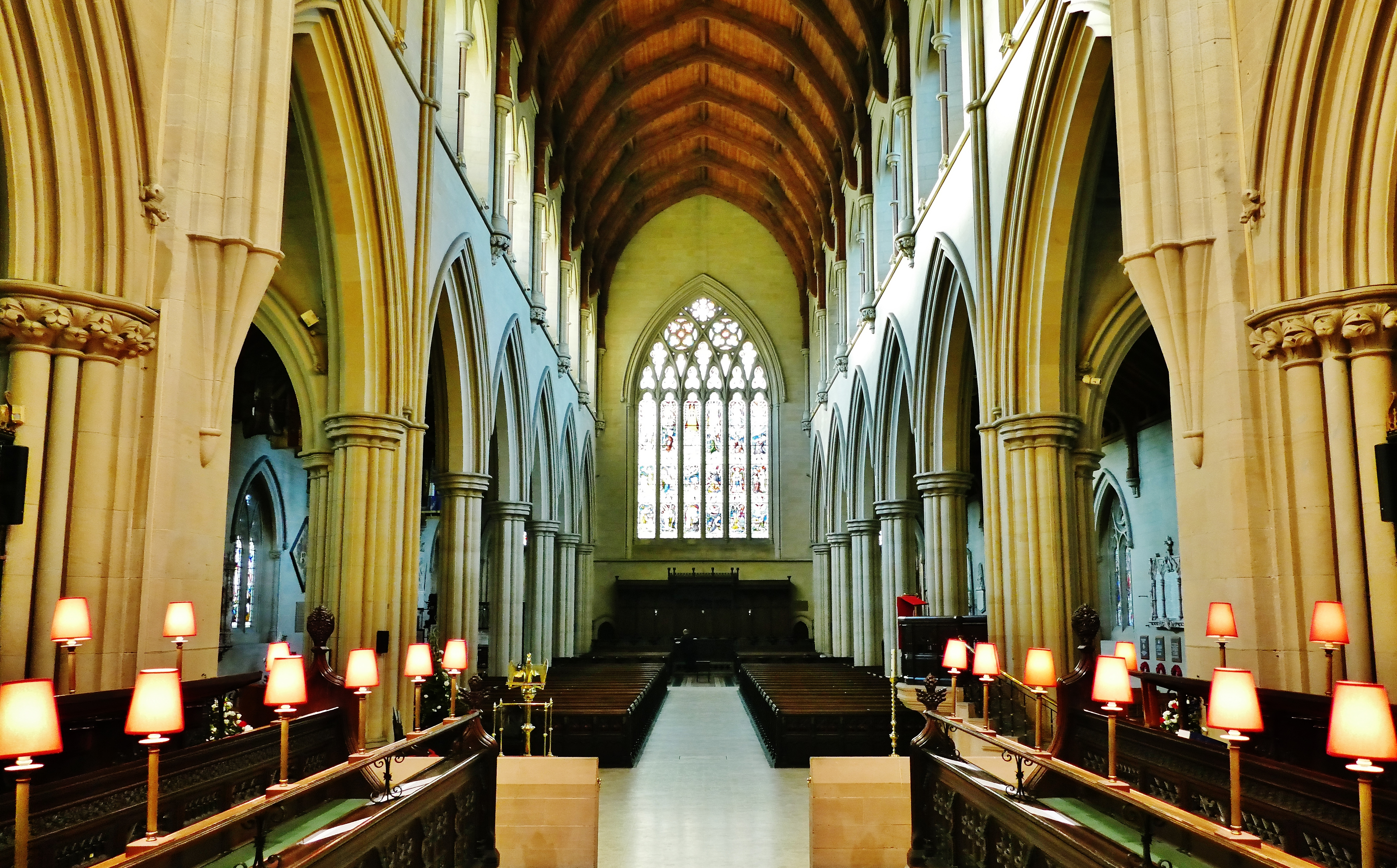
Nave

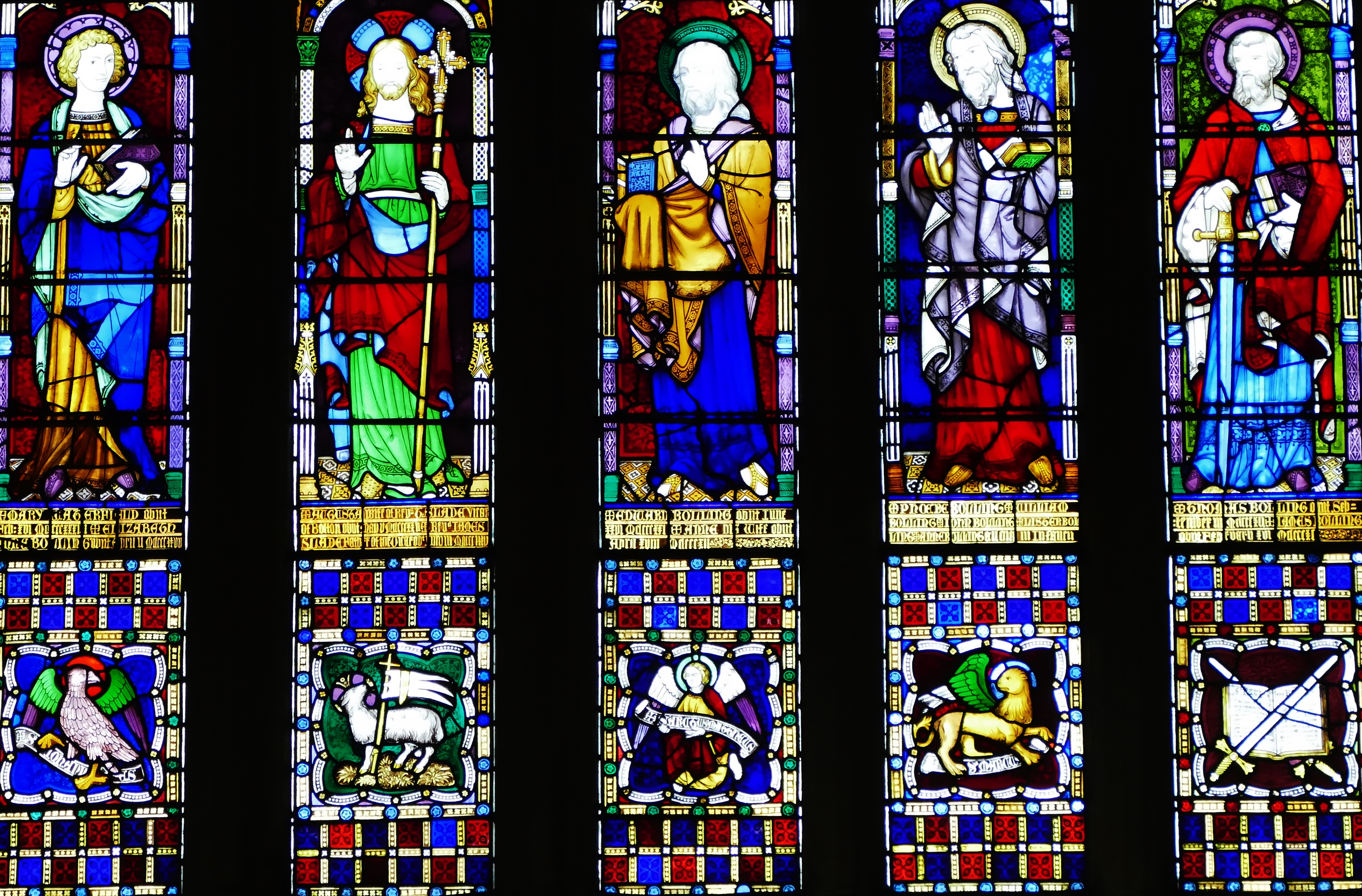
Stained glass window

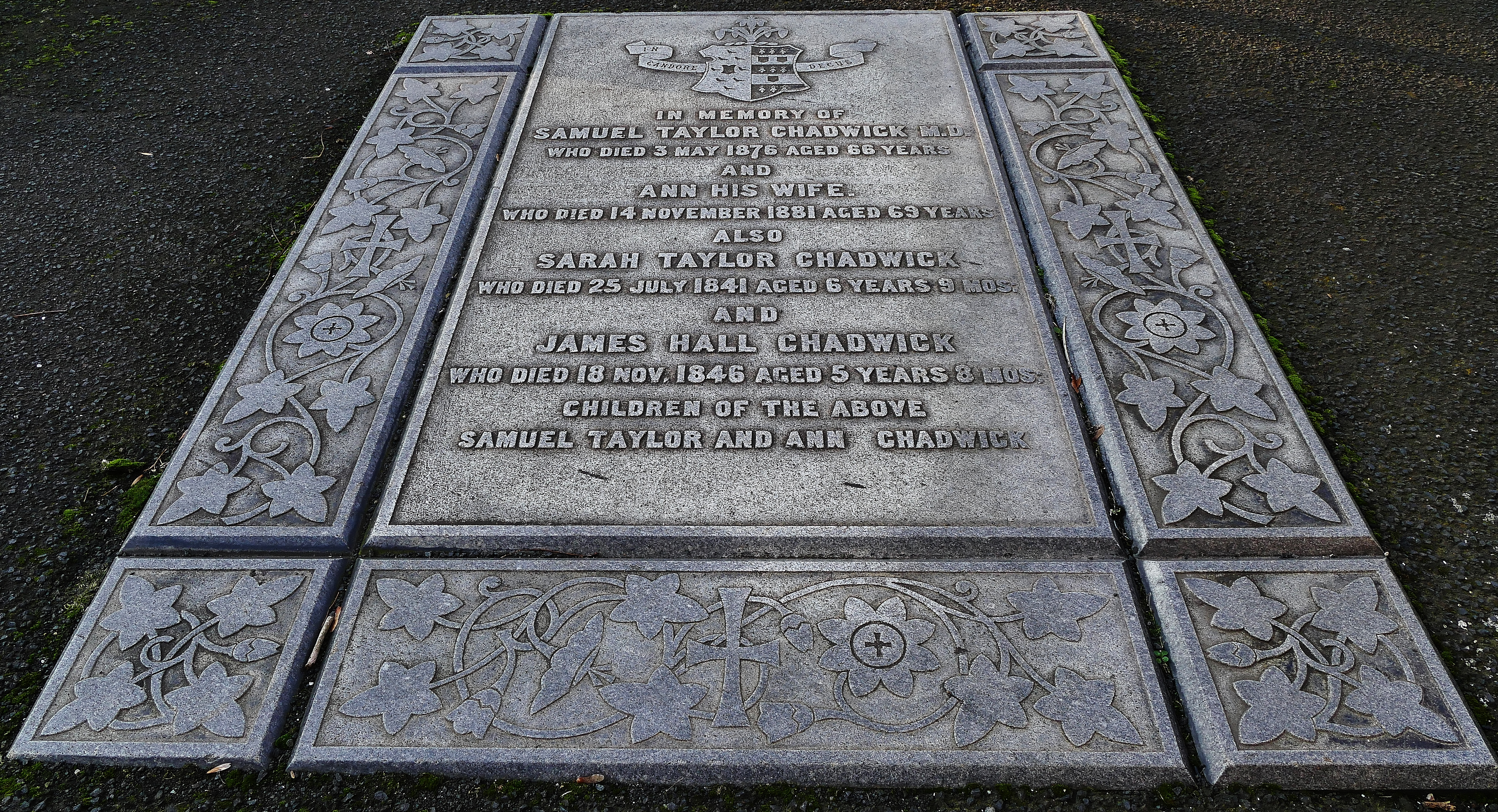
Gravestone

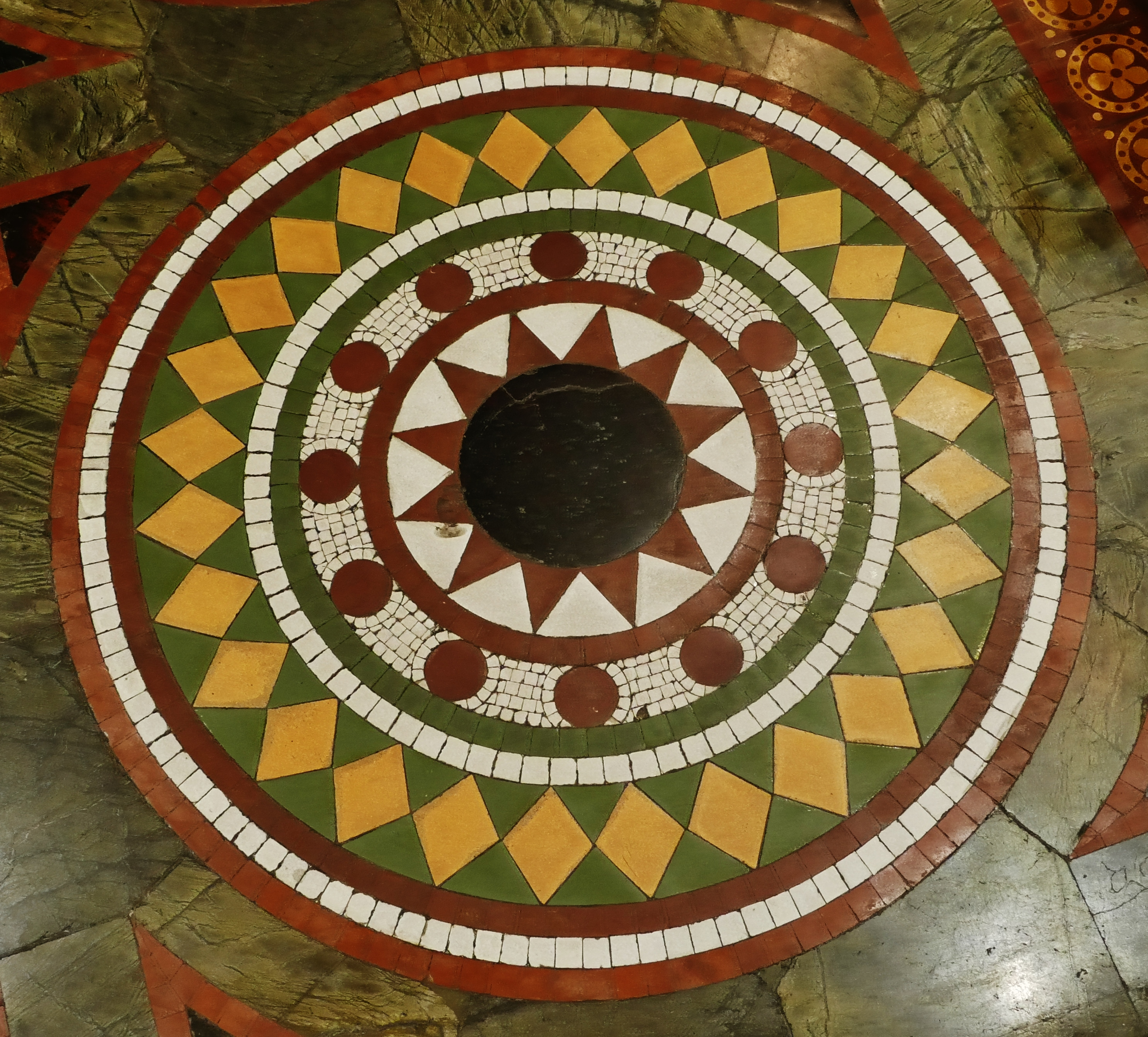
Floor tiles in the chancel

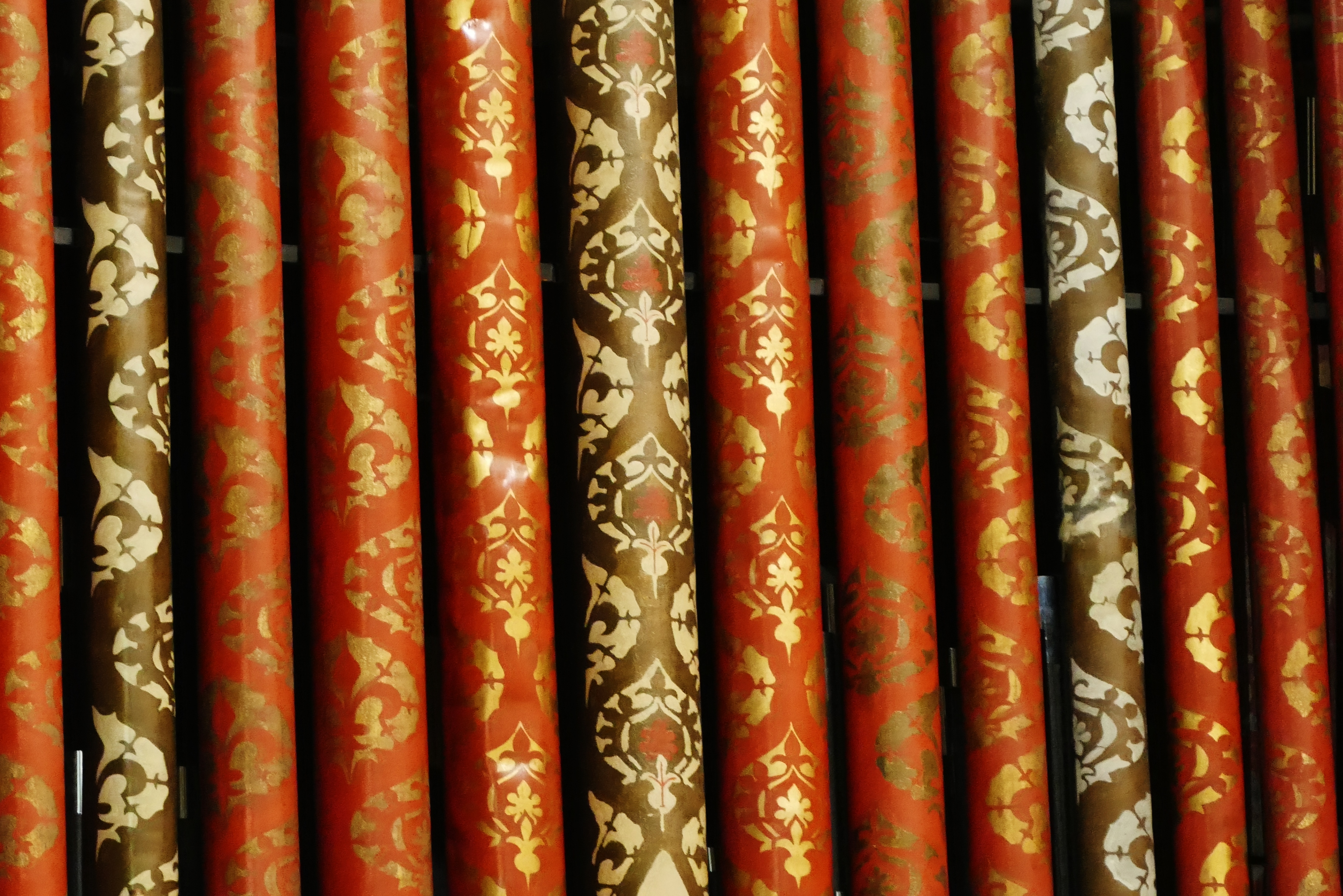
Decorated organ pipes

== See also ==
- List of churches in Greater Manchester
- Listed buildings in Bolton
- List of ecclesiastical works by E. G. Paley
