= Edgar Stephenson =

The Ven. Edgar Stephenson (24 September 1894 – 29 May 1984) was Archdeacon of Rochdale from 1951 until 1962.

Stephenson was educated at the University of Manchester; and ordained in 1925. He held curacies in Salford and Worsley in the greater Manchester area. He was Vicar of St Mary, Oldham from 1947 to 1955 and Director of Religious Education in the Diocese of Manchester from 1955 to 1962.

Church of England titles
Preceded by Albert Fisher Gaskell	Archdeacon of Rochdale; 1951–1962	Succeeded by Leonard George Tyler
