= Thomas Bancroft =

Thomas Bancroft may refer to:

- Thomas Bancroft (poet) (c. 1596–1658), English poet.
- Thomas Bancroft (MP) (died 1636), English MP for Castle Rising
- Thomas Bancroft (priest) (1756–1811), English Anglican vicar of Bolton-le-Moors
- Thomas David Bancroft (1837–1917), American temperance movement activist, writer, and public speaker on the Lincoln assassination
- Thomas Lane Bancroft (1860–1933), Australian medical naturalist
- Tom Bancroft (born 1967), British jazz drummer and composer
