= Ruth Higham =

English glamour model

- Born: Ruth Higham; 1978 (age 47–48)
- Education: Canon Slade School
- Occupation: Glamour model

Ruth Higham (born 1978) is an English former glamour model from Harwood, Lancashire (a suburb of Bolton). She began appearing as a Page 3 girl in the Daily Star and The Sun newspapers in 1998.

== Early life ==
Higham attended Canon Slade School in Bradshaw, Greater Manchester. She became a beauty consultant for Max Factor.

== Modelling ==
Higham was a Page 3 model from 1998 until around 2004. She first appeared on Page 3 of The Sun on 17 April 2000 and appeared in the newspaper 30 times. From 2002 to 2006, she was the model for Aintree-produced Big D peanuts; this caused a 35% increase in sales in 2003. She was also associated with a testicular cancer awareness campaign under the slogan "Say nuts to cancer". In April 2005, she starred in a television commercial for BT with Jeremy Clarkson. She has also appeared in advertisements for PS2 and Solpadeine. In 1999, she appeared in a web-based 'soap opera' called Launderama for detergent manufacturer ACDO in Bolton, where she played the part of Glo White in a tour of UK universities. She also appeared in a short drama series on the former channel Granada Breeze called 4Play, in which she played the role of a TV presenter based in Manchester. In February 2003, she appeared with two other models on Blind Date, becoming the first candidate to be rejected.
