= Chris Edmondson =

British retired Anglican bishop (born 1950)

The Right Reverend Chris Edmondson
- Bishop of Bolton
- Church: Church of England
- Diocese: Diocese of Manchester
- In office: 2008–2016
- Predecessor: David Gillett
- Successor: Mark Ashcroft
- Previous posts: Warden of Lee Abbey, 2002–2008

Orders
- Ordination: 1974
- Consecration: 25 April 2008

Personal details
- Born: 25 June 1950 (age 76) Carlisle, Cumbria, England
- Denomination: Anglican
- Education: St John's College, Durham

Christopher Paul Edmondson (born 25 June 1950) is a British retired Anglican bishop. He was the Bishop of Bolton, a suffragan bishop in the Diocese of Manchester, from 2008 to 2016. He is presently an Honorary Assistant Bishop in the Diocese of Leeds.

== Early life and education ==
Edmondson was born on 25 June 1950. He was educated at St John's College, Durham University.

== Ordained ministry ==
Edmondson was ordained in 1974 and began his ecclesiastical career with a curacy at Kirkheaton. From 1979 until 1986 he was Vicar of Ovenden, and also in the latter part of his Incumbency the Bishop of Wakefield's adviser on Evangelism. After further pastoral posts he became Warden of Lee Abbey, Lynton, Devon, in 2002. This lead in turn to elevation to the suffragan bishopric of Bolton on the retirement of David Gillett. He since became chair of the Scargill Movement – a position he still holds.

=== Episcopal ministry ===
Edmondson was consecrated on 25 April 2008 at York Minster and installed at Manchester Cathedral two days later. Both ceremonies were shared with Mark Davies, Bishop of Middleton (his fellow suffragan in the diocese). Between the retirement of Nigel McCulloch on 17 January 2013 and David Walker's confirmation on 7 October 2013, Edmondson and Davies were (co-equally) acting Bishops of Manchester. On 31 October 2015, Edmondson announced that he would retire as Bishop of Bolton on 30 June 2016.

== Styles ==
- The Reverend Chris Edmondson (1974–2008)
- The Right Reverend Chris Edmondson (2008–present)

Church of England titles
Preceded by David Gillett	Bishop of Bolton; 2008–2016	Succeeded by Mark Ashcroft
