= Thomas Sale =

Thomas Sale may refer to:

- Tommy Sale (1910–1990), English footballer
- Tommy Sale (rugby league) (1918–2016), English rugby league footballer
- Thomas Sale (priest) (1865–1939), Archdeacon of Rochdale
