= John Rushton =

John Rushton may refer to:

- J. Philippe Rushton (1943–2012), British-born Canadian psychology professor
- John Rushton (priest) (1798–1868), Archdeacon of Manchester
