= Philip Bailey (disambiguation) =

Philip Bailey (born 1951) is an American singer and songwriter.

Philip Bailey may also refer to:

== Music ==
- Philip Bailey (album), a 1994 studio album by Philip Bailey

== People ==
- Philip Bailey (statistician) (born 1953), English cricket statistician
- Philip James Bailey (1816–1902), English poet

== See also ==
- Phil Bailey (born 1980), Australian rugby footballer
