= David Bonser =

The Rt Revd David Bonser MA AKC
- Bishop of Bolton
- Diocese: Diocese of Manchester
- In office: 1991–1999
- Predecessor: David Galliford
- Successor: David Gillett
- Previous post: Archdeacon of Rochdale (1982–1991)

Orders
- Ordination: c. 1962 (deacon); c. 1963 (priest)
- Consecration: 1991

Personal details
- Born: 1 February 1934
- Died: 20 March 2005 (aged 71)
- Denomination: Anglican
- Parents: George & Alice
- Spouse: Shirley Wilkinson (m. 1960; d. 2004)
- Children: 1 son; 2 daughters
- Education: King's College London

David Bonser (1 February 1934 – 20 March 2005) was the Anglican Bishop of Bolton from 1991 until 1999.

Educated at King's College London Bonser studied for ordination at St Boniface Missionary College, Warminster. He became an Associate of King's College (AKC) in 1961 and later obtained an MA from the University of Manchester (1975).

He embarked upon curacies in Heckmondwike and Sheffield. From 1968 until 1972 he was Rector of St Clement's, Chorlton-cum-Hardy, and latterly an Honorary Canon of Manchester Cathedral. For nine years after that he was Archdeacon of Rochdale before elevation to the suffragan bishopric of Bolton in 1991. He retired eight years later and died on 20 March 2005.

Church of England titles
Preceded by Harold Fielding	Archdeacon of Rochdale; 1982–1991	Succeeded by Mark Dalby
Preceded by David Galliford	Bishop of Bolton; 1991–1999	Succeeded by David Gillett
