= CricketArchive =

Sports website for cricket

- Website type: Cricket database
- Available in: English
- Website: www.cricketarchive.com
- Commercial: No
- Registration: Paid (since 2017)
- Launched: 2003
- Current status: Active

CricketArchive is a sports website that provides a comprehensive archive of records and data for the game of cricket. It was founded in 2003 by Philip Bailey and Peter Griffiths.

The website contains data corresponding to 1.5 million players, 820,000 scorecards and 15,000 grounds, curated by cricket statistician Philip Bailey.

Over the years, various cricket writers have recognized it as a leading online source for cricket statistics. The Indian Express described it as a haven for obsessive cricket fans. In 2017 it implemented a paywall (previously being free to access).

== See also ==
- Cricbuzz
- Cricinfo
