= Mark Ashcroft =

British Anglican bishop

The Right Reverend Mark Ashcroft
- Bishop of Bolton
- Church: Church of England
- Province: Province of York
- Diocese: Diocese of Manchester
- In office: 2016–2023
- Predecessor: Chris Edmondson
- Other post: Archdeacon of Manchester (2009–2016)

Orders
- Ordination: 1982 (deacon); 1983 (priest)
- Consecration: 18 October 2016 by John Sentamu

Personal details
- Born: Mark David Ashcroft; 3 September 1954 (age 72) Rugby, Warwickshire, England
- Denomination: Anglicanism
- Spouse: Sally
- Children: Three
- Education: Worcester College, Oxford; Ridley Hall, Cambridge; Fitzwilliam College, Cambridge

Ashcroft in 2017

Mark David Ashcroft (born 3 September 1954) is a British retired Anglican bishop. From 2016 until 2023, he was the Bishop of Bolton. He had previously been Archdeacon of Manchester from 2009 to 2016. Apart from ten years working in Kenya, he has spent all his ordained ministry in the Diocese of Manchester, Church of England.

== Early life and education ==
Ashcroft was born on 3 September 1954 in Rugby, Warwickshire, England. He was educated at Rugby School, then an all-boys public school in his home town. He studied at Worcester College, Oxford, graduating with a Bachelor of Arts (BA) degree in 1977; as per tradition, this BA was promoted to a Master of Arts (MA Oxon) in 1982. From 1978 to 1979, he worked as a restaurant manager in Edinburgh, Scotland.

In 1979, Ashcroft entered Ridley Hall, Cambridge, an Anglican theological college in the Open Evangelical tradition, to train for ordained ministry. For the first two years, he also studied theology at Fitzwilliam College, Cambridge. He graduated from the University of Cambridge with a BA degree in 1981. He undertook a further year of training at Ridley Hall, before being ordained in 1982.

== Ordained ministry ==
Ashcroft was ordained in the Church of England as a deacon in 1982 and as a priest in 1983. From 1982 to 1985, he served his curacy at St Margaret's Church, Burnage, in the Diocese of Manchester. He spent 1986 to 1996 as a member of the academic staff of St Paul's College, Kapsabet, one of the theological colleges of the Anglican Church of Kenya; he was a tutor between 1986 and 1989, and its principal between 1990 and 1996.

In 1996, Ashcroft returned to England. He was rector of Christ Church, Harpurhey from 1996 to 2009, and also area dean of North Manchester from 2000 to 2006. In 2004, he was made an honorary canon of Manchester Cathedral. In 2009, he was appointed the Archdeacon of Manchester.

=== Episcopal ministry ===
On 22 June 2016, it was announced that Ashcroft would become the next Bishop of Bolton, a suffragan bishop in the Diocese of Manchester. He was consecrated a bishop on 18 October 2016 by John Sentamu, Archbishop of York, during a service at York Minster.

On 18 July 2022, it was announced that Ashcroft would retire as Bishop of Bolton during February 2023. He retired on an unrevealed date following his farewell service (on 28 January 2023) at Manchester Cathedral.

== Personal life ==
Ashcroft is married to Sally. Together, they had three sons.

Church of England titles
Preceded by Andrew Ballard	Archdeacon of Manchester; 2009–2016	Karen Lund
Preceded by Chris Edmondson	Bishop of Bolton; 2016–2023	TBA
