= James Harris (rugby union) =

- Born: James Harris; 26 August 1987 (age 39)

Rugby union career
- Current team: Unknown
Senior career
Years	Team	Apps	(Points)
2006–2010	Newport GD	19	(10)

James Harris (born 26 August 1987) is a Welsh rugby union player. He was educated at Eltham College and the University of Oxford, where he played on the winning university team in the 2012 and 2013 Varsity Matches. In the 2013 match he was substituted after suffering a dislocated hip in the first half, which later required surgery.

Harris plays in the position of flanker. He was selected for the Wales national rugby sevens team squad in 2007 and has also represented Wales Under-20s. He played for Bedwas RFC, before joining Newport Gwent Dragons regional team on 30 September 2006. He was released by Newport Gwent Dragons in August 2010 and joined the Blackheath Rugby Club. In August 2011 he joined London Wasps, where he played until 2012.
