= Canon Slade School =

Academy in Greater Manchester, England

Location
- Bradshaw Brow; Bradshaw, Bolton, Greater Manchester, BL2 3PB; England; 53.602127°N 2.409106°W

Information
- Type: Academy
- Motto: Ora et Labora (Latin: Pray and Work)
- Religious affiliation: Church of England
- Established: ante 1855
- Founder: Canon James Slade
- Local authority: Bolton Metropolitan Borough Council
- Trust: The Bishop Fraser Trust
- Department for Education URN: 144044 Tables
- Ofsted: Reports
- Headteacher: James Gilhooly
- Gender: Coeducational
- Age: 11 to 18
- Enrolment: 1,710
- Website: Official website

Canon Slade School is a coeducational Church of England secondary school and sixth form located in Bradshaw in the Metropolitan Borough of Bolton, Greater Manchester, England.

== History ==
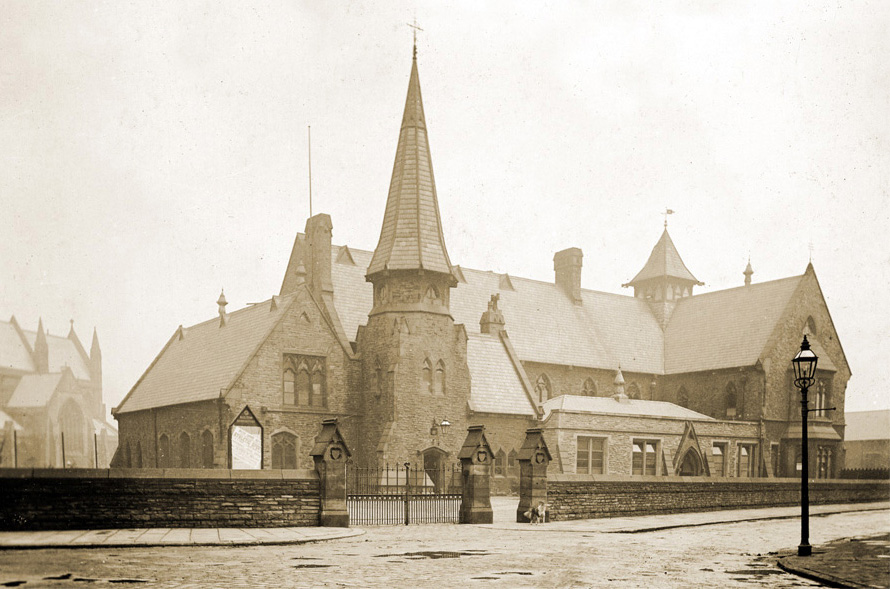
Bolton Church Institute, St Peter's Church in the background

The school was founded in 1855 by Canon James Slade as Bolton Church Institute, aimed at educating the poorer children of Bolton. The Church Institute was on Institute Street, next to St Peter's Church. The school became a direct grant grammar school and moved to its current site on Bradshaw Brow in 1956. It later became a comprehensive school. It holds an annual Founder's Day service at St Peter's and in 2005 celebrated its 150th anniversary with an event at the Bolton Arena. A brief history was created by the historian John Aldred, a former history teacher at the school, and a whole school photograph was taken to commemorate the occasion.

The original school building in Institute Street is now a Society of Friends Meeting House and offices.

== About the school ==
The school has around 1,700 pupils on roll, including 340 in the sixth form. It has a reputation for its academic work, for several years the sixth form has been ranked amongst the top thirty nationally for A-level results in a comprehensive state school, and also for sport (Sportsmark Award and regular success in national competitions), for music, drama and other activities. It was a Specialist Arts College and is a Training School and has Healthy School and Leading Edgy status. Since 2004 the school has been an Ambassador School for the National Academy of Gifted and Talented Youth. In 2009 the school was awarded Gold Standard by the Specialist School and Academies Trust for Community Cohesion.

Canon Slade School is set on a 57-acre (230,000 m^{2}) site in the foothills of the West Pennine Moors on which are hundreds of mature trees, a river bank, two wildlife ponds, one of which is inhabited by several endangered species of amphibian, extensive sports fields, including a cross-country course and floodlit all-weather pitch.

Previously a voluntary aided school administered by Bolton Metropolitan Borough Council, in December 2017 Canon Slade School converted to academy status. The school is now sponsored by The Bishop Fraser Trust.

== Admissions ==
The admissions policy gives priority to looked after children and children from "committed Christian families". The number of intended admissions each year to Year 7 is now 300. Pupils are admitted without reference to ability and aptitude except in the case of applicants to the sixth form. To gain access to the sixth form candidates must hold a minimum of five GCSEs at grades 9 - 6 including English Language and Mathematics.

== Sixth form ==
The sixth form centre is Ashworth House. More than 50% of Year 11 pupils join the sixth form where there are around 340 pupils on roll.

The range of A Level subjects offered includes Art and Design, Biology, Chemistry, Classical Civilisation, Computing, Dance, Design Technology, Drama and Theatre Studies, Economics and Business Studies, English Language, English Language and Literature, English Literature, Environmental Science, Film Studies, Food Technology, French, General Studies, Geography, Geology, German, History, Information and Communication Technology, Law, Mathematics: Further, Pure and Applied, Mathematics: Pure and Mechanics, Mathematics: Pure and Statistics, Music, Music Technology, Performing Arts, Physical Education, Physics, Psychology, Religious Studies, Sociology and Spanish. There is also AS Critical Thinking and the Extended Project Qualification (EPQ). The more vocational Advanced Creative and Media Diploma (worth 3.5 A-Levels) is also available.

As of the academic term for 2019, Music Technology was no longer offered.

== Notable former pupils ==
=== Bolton Church Institute ===
- William Lever, 1st Viscount Leverhulme

=== Canon Slade School ===
- Katy Cavanagh, actor
- Julie Foy, actor and producer
- Tom Glynn-Carney, actor
- Ruth Higham, glamour model
- Maxine Peake, actress
- Sara Cox, DJ, Presenter, Author.
