= Gerald Summers =

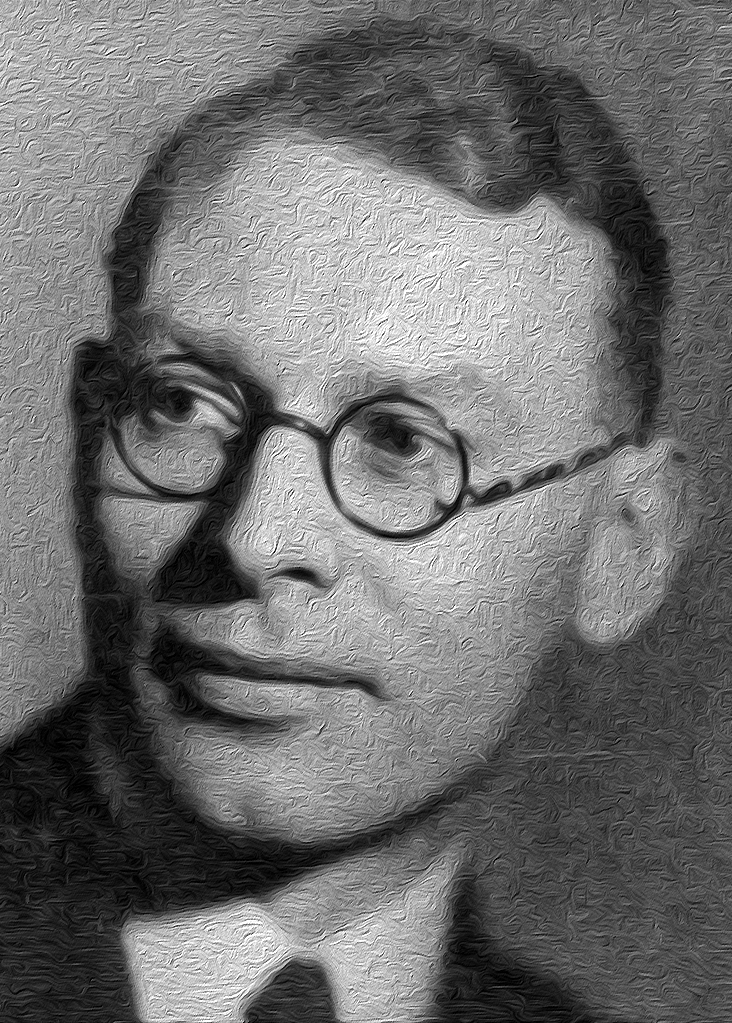

Gerald Summers (1899–1967) was a British mid-century modern furniture designer. He came to prominence with his design for the Bent Plywood Armchair. Another of his noted works was the Two-Tier Table. Both pieces were designed in 1934 and manufactured by Makers of Simple Furniture, the firm he founded in 1931.

== Life ==
Summers was born in Alexandria, Egypt in 1899, the youngest of six children. He attended Eltham College located in the south eastern part of London. At school Gerald won a prize for carpentry - he made a pipe rack.

In 1915, Summers left school at the age of 16 with no plans. An apprenticeship through a family friend who practiced at the Ruston Engineering Firm followed, but his experience was cut short when he joined the army during World War I. He returned home from the war and met his future wife Marjorie Butcher whilst working at Marconi. She became his partner and as a gift to her, Summers made her an elegant table and wardrobe. Early works for his flat and Marjorie's bedroom were the start of his design career.

== Career ==
In 1929, Gerald and Marjorie started a business to make and sell Gerald's designs. Right from the beginning his instinct was for simple, straightforward design. And so they founded "Makers of Simple Furniture". This was a small British company which produced furniture mainly to order. He embraced the contemporary style and pushed its boundaries. He later had the opportunity to hold his own exhibition at the Fortnum & Mason department store in London. Also participating in the exhibitions was another famous maker of a plywood armchair, Alvar Aalto.

Summers specialized in malleable and free-form designs. His commitment to function led to his choice of airplane, birch plywood enabling creative and innovative designs. He became known for his Bent Plywood Armchair, which showed off his ability of folding, bending and molding wood to achieve high standards of flexibility. Summers had the ability to transform a given wood material into a diverse, different and seamless piece of furniture with a glossy surface, combined with the modernistic touch on life.

During World War II, in 1940, Summers' firm closed. Summers died in 1967, at the age of 68, but the impact left by his work is still evident. Summers' furniture is widely appreciated in the current architectural and design world. He is still celebrated as an icon of impressive furniture designs and his pieces are prized by museums and collectors alike. His furniture is in collections in the Vitra Design Museum in Germany and the Metropolitan Museum of Art and Museum of Modern Art in New York

== Works ==
=== Bent Plywood Armchair ===
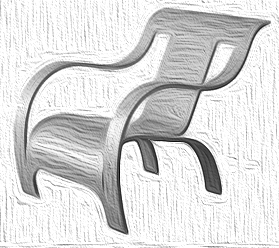

Summers' organically shaped armchair, comfortable even without cushions, involved low material and labour inputs. It was constructed from a single sheet of plywood. With its smooth surface and lack of metal connectors, it is hygienic and deteriorates only gradually. Its unusual shape may stem from Alvar Aalto's furniture, especially the spectacular “Paimio” chair, which was shown in London in 1933. However, the redating of Makers of Simple Furniture's bent-plywood coffee skid to March 1933 calls this into question. Only 120 units of the chair were produced. Despite the constructive advantages, the production costs of the chair and thus the sales price were higher than the popular Scandinavian designs. It was certainly also a disadvantage that the back legs could not withstand great stress and snapped easily. This is the only product made by The Makers of Simple Furniture known to have been sold in the United States.

=== Two Tier Table ===
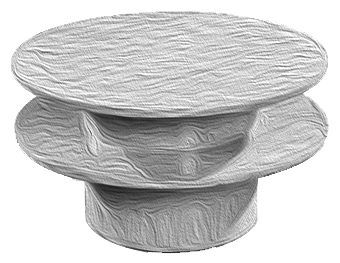

The center pedestal table with two tiers was one of three models of two-tier occasional tables designed in 1934 by Gerald Summers and constructed by 'Makers of Simple Furniture'. The item was a simple drum style table made of birch plywood. To determine the tier's height, Gerald used the so-called golden ratio. It is considered a rare and very collectible piece of British modernism, with birch plywood drum and top.

=== Other Works ===
Gerald's other designs included: the "Z" Type Table, Three Legged Table with two tiers, Folding Coffee Table, Coffee Skid, Book Units, Dinner Wagon, Bookcase Desk.

== Bibliography ==
- Reeves, Paul. The Best of British: Design from the 19th and 20th Centuries. London: Sotheby's, 2008.
- Deese, Martha Hart. Gerald Summers and Makers of Simple Furniture. 1989.
- Deese, Martha. Gerald Summers & Marjorie Butcher: Makers of Simple Furniture, 1931–1940. 2024
- Deese, Martha Makers of Simple Furniture, published in the Journal of Design History Vol. 5, Issue 3 (Oxford University Press, 1992).
- Makers of Simple Furniture (Firm), and Gerald Summers. 1935. [Furniture trade catalogue]. [London?]: [Makers of Simple Furniture?].
- Shone, Richard. "John Piper and Other Exhibitions. London and Norwich." The Burlington Magazine 126, no. 972 (1984): 173–75.
- Phillips Son & Neale (London, England). 2000. Modernism & post-war design: including a collection of Gerald Summers furniture.
- Worth, Charles and Caroline. Tireless Zeal: The Life of William Summers, Missionary 1864-1916. 2020
