= Selwyn Bean =

Archdeacon of Manchester

Bean in 1970.

Arthur Selwyn Bean (23 April 1886 – 4 July 1981) was Archdeacon of Manchester from 1934 to 1966. He was educated at Christ’s College, Christchurch, New Zealand and Keble College, Oxford and ordained in 1910. After a curacy in Rugby he held incumbencies at Ribby with Wrea, Weaste, and Astley. He was an Honorary Chaplain to the Forces during World War II and an Honorary Chaplain to the Queen from 1952 to 1969.

Church of England titles
Preceded by Noel Lake Aspinall	Archdeacon of Manchester; 1916–1934	Succeeded by Stuart Hetley Price
