= Arthur Clarke (priest) =

Arthur Frederic Clarke (22 December 1848 – 4 January 1932) was an eminent Anglican priest in the late nineteenth and early twentieth centuries.

He was educated at Charterhouse and Trinity College, Oxford. He was ordained in 1874. After curacies at Beverley, Linthorpe, Alvechurch and Leek Wootton he was Vicar of Cockerham from 1881 until 1905; and Archdeacon of Lancaster from 1896 to 1905. He was then Vicar of Rochdale from 1905 to 1910; its Rural Dean from 1905 to 1910; and its Archdeacon from 1910 to 1919. During this period he was also an honorary chaplain to the forces. A bell at St Andrew, Singapore is dedicated to him.

Church of England titles
Preceded by William Hornby	Archdeacon of Lancaster; 1896–1905	Succeeded by William Bonsey
Preceded by Inaugural appointment	Archdeacon of Rochdale; 1910–1919	Succeeded by Thomas Sale
