= Adrian Nance =

British officer

Commodore Adrian Nance OBE
- Military career
- Allegiance: Great Britain
- Branch: Royal Navy
- Rank: Commodore
- Commands: HMS Ark Royal; 6th Frigate Squadron; HMS ‘’Montrose’’ HMS Cardiff; HMS Nottingham
- Conflicts: Falklands War; First Gulf War
- Awards: Officer of the Order of the British Empire

Commodore Adrian Nance OBE is a former Royal Navy officer and founder of several startup companies, as well as an international charity called "Wings Like Eagles" which provides disaster relief in Africa.

== Early life ==
Nance was educated at Eltham College and graduated from Birmingham University with a BSc in chemical engineering in 1976.

== Naval career ==
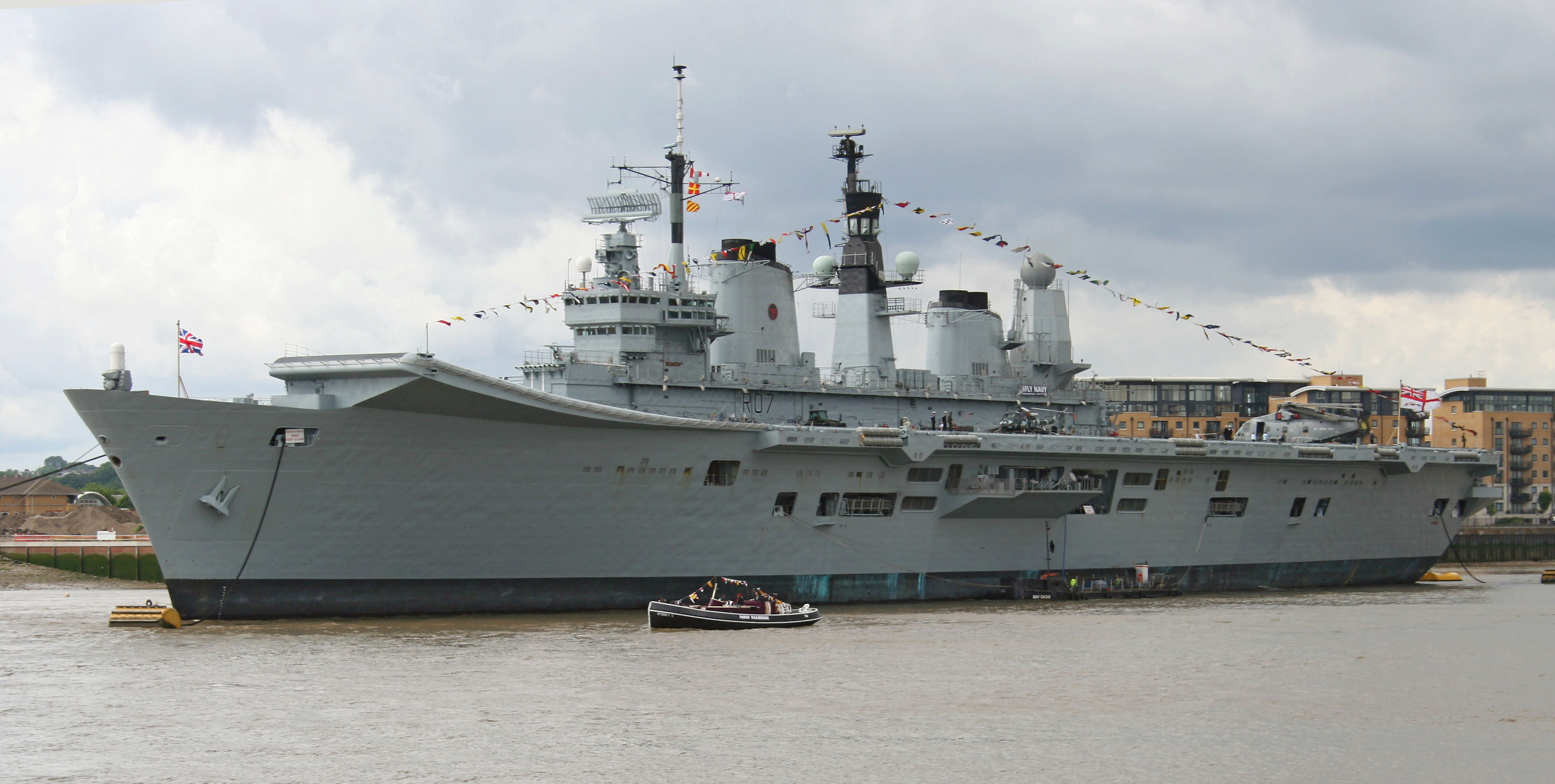
HMS Ark Royal

Nance started his long association with naval operations and military aviation in 1978, achieving the rank of commodore by the end of his time in the navy. He survived the sinking of HMS Sheffield (D80) in the Falklands Conflict in 1982. HMS Sheffield was part of the task force sent to the Falkland Islands during the Falklands War. She was struck by an Exocet air-launched anti-ship missile from a Super Etendard aircraft belonging to the Argentine Navy on 4 May 1982 and foundered on 10 May 1982. Nance was awarded the South Atlantic Medal in 1982. He was twice the senior anti-air warfare officer for all British naval forces in the Tanker war, and was awarded the General Service Medal (Gulf clasp). As a result of that high intensity front line experience, Nance became a senior trainer on the elite staff of the Flag Officer Sea Training, and for 18 months he was the trainer of UK frigate, destroyer and aircraft carrier commanding officers, with other commanders from Holland, Germany, Portugal, Belgium and Italy. He was promoted to command of the destroyer HMS Nottingham in 1990, becoming one of the youngest commanding officers in the Royal Navy at the time. Later, Nance was appointed commander aboard the destroyer HMS Cardiff during the Gulf War, being awarded an OBE for his role. During the war, HMS Cardiff's Lynx helicopter claimed two Iraqi TNC-45 fast attack craft, two ZHUK fast patrol craft and one Landing Craft resupplying Iraqi forces in Saudi Arabia.

Nance then commanded the 6th Frigate Squadron, the Navy's largest at the time, comprising 7 frigates based from HMS Montrose, from 1997 to 1998. After a brief stint at the Ministry of Defence, he was given the position of commanding officer of HMS Ark Royal from 2003 to 2004. From 2004 to 2006, Nance was based at the Royal Navy Maritime Warfare School based in HMS Collingwood, training commanding officers and 20,000 other naval personnel per year. Nance was also involved in hosting dignitaries attending celebrations for the 200th anniversary of the Battle of Trafalgar.

Overall, Nance served for 33 years in the Royal Navy.

== Later life ==
Since his retirement in 2006, Nance has worked on disaster relief activities in southern Africa, amongst other work. In 2007 he founded the charity Wings Like Eagles, which sends relief to disasters in southern Africa. Wings Like Eagles accompanied Mercy Air in providing help for people affected by cyclone Idai in Mozambique in 2019, and also coordinated the disaster response air group with the UN, which peaked at 23 aircraft. Nance's charity also helped provide aid after cyclone Eloise hit the East coast of Africa in 2021. Nance also founded a helicopter company which owns a Bell Jet Ranger helicopter, based in South Africa, which aids in disaster relief and humanitarian work for the local area.

In 2012, Nance and his wife, Barbara, opened the refurbished Sea Survival Training Centre in Portsmouth.
