= Noel Aspinall =

Noel Lake Aspinall (30 January 1861 – 17 June 1934) was Archdeacon of Manchester from 1916 to 1934.

He was educated at St John's College, Oxford and ordained in 1886. He began his ecclesiastical career with curacies in Sheffield and Ecclesall. He was Rector of Holy Trinity Church, Chesterfield from 1892 to 1902; of St Edmund, Whalley Range from August 1902 to 1922, and of St George's, Hulme, Manchester from 1922 to 1926.

Church of England titles
| Preceded by Willoughby Charles Allen | Archdeacon of Manchester; 1916–1934 | Succeeded by Arthur Selwyn Bean |
