= Mark Dalby =

(John) Mark (Meredith) Dalby (3 January 1938 – 11 February 2013) was Archdeacon of Rochdale from 1991 to 2000.

== Birth and education ==
He was born on 3 January 1938, educated at King George Grammar School, Southport and Exeter College, Oxford, and ordained in 1964 following theological study at Ripon Hall, Oxford.

== Church career ==
After curacies in Hambleden, and Medmenham he was Vicar of St Peter, Birmingham from 1968 to 1975; Selection Secretary for the ACCM from 1975 to 1980;Vicar of St Mark, Worsley from 1980 to 1991; Rural Dean of Eccles from 1987 until his Archdeacon’s appointment.

== Private life ==
Dalby was an active and senior Freemason. Under the United Grand Lodge of England (mainstream Freemasonry) he achieved office as Deputy Grand Chaplain (the second most senior clerical appointment) in 2006. Under the Grand Lodge of Mark Master Masons of England and Wales and its Districts and Lodges Overseas, the largest of the additional Masonic Orders or 'side degrees', he achieved office as Deputy Grand Chaplain in 2000, and as Grand Chaplain the following year.

Church of England titles
| Preceded by David Bonser | Archdeacon of Rochdale; 1991–2000 | Succeeded by Andrew Edgar Ballard |
