= Piers Benn =

British philosopher (born 1962)

- Born: 1962 (age 63–64)
- Education: University of Oxford (BA); Birkbeck College (PhD)
- Occupation: Professor of philosophy

Piers Benn (born 1962) is a British philosopher. His research interests include medical ethics, philosophy of religion, and the philosophy of psychiatry.

== Life and career ==
Benn grew up in Blackheath, southeast London, with parents June, a romantic novelist, and David Wedgwood Benn, a BBC producer and Russian specialist. David was a brother of Labour politician Tony Benn. Piers was educated at Eltham College in Mottingham until 1980 and gained his Bachelor of Arts degree (First Class) in Philosophy & Modern Languages from the University of Oxford (Magdalen College, 1984). He received his PhD in philosophy ("Human Death: its Nature and Significance") from Birkbeck College, University of London, in 1992. He has taught at the University of St. Andrews, University of Leeds, Imperial College London, and King's College London. As of 2015, he is a visiting lecturer at Heythrop College in London and an adjunct professor at the London Centre of Fordham University New York. He has also written articles in various journals and appeared on British media.

His 1997 book, Ethics, re-issued by Routledge in 2000, is a textbook for undergraduate courses. The book is both an introduction into the subject and a substantive argument in favour of the neo-Aristotelian view of the objectivity of moral claims.

His 2011 book, Commitment is one of the books in Acumen Press' Art of Living series.

== Views ==
Benn was among the 43 signatories of a 2002 letter sent to Tony Blair, expressing alarm at the teaching of creationism in British state-funded schools.

Commenting in New Humanist in 2002, Benn suggested that people who fear the rise of Islamophobia foster an environment "not intellectually or morally healthy", to the point that what he calls "Islamophobia-phobia" can undermine "critical scrutiny of Islam as somehow impolite, or ignorant of the religion's true nature", encouraging "sentimental pretence that all claims to religious truth are somehow 'equal', or that critical scrutiny of Islam (or any belief system) is ignorant, prejudiced, or 'phobic'".

== Bibliography ==
- Ethics, Fundamentals of Philosophy series, McGill-Queen's University Press / UCL Press, 1997 ISBN 0-7735-1700-6 (hardcover), ISBN 0-7735-1701-4 (paperback, 1998), Routledge, 1997 ISBN 1-85728-453-4 (paperback), ISBN 1-85728-679-0 (hardcover), ISBN 0-203-04628-5 (e-book)
- "How Should We Treat the Dead?", in Thinking about Death, British Humanist Association (2002)
- Commitment, (Art of Living series), Acumen Press 2011.
