= Seven Acres Country Park, Bolton =

Park in Bolton, Greater Manchester, England

Seven Acres Country Park
- Location within Greater Manchester
- Type: Local Nature Reserve
- Location: Bolton, Greater Manchester, England
- Coordinates: 53°35′09″N 2°23′58″W
- Status: Open all year

Seven Acres Country Park is a country park and Local Nature Reserve in Bolton, Greater Manchester. It lies between the areas of Tonge and Breightmet, and is bisected by Bradshaw Brook. Seven Acres Country Park is more than 300 years old, and is depicted on maps dating back to at least 1764.

== History ==
Today, Seven Acres Country Park encompasses more acreage than the nineteenth century-dubbed-name implies. Former folds such as Ellis Fold, along with its surrounding enclosed fields, are now incorporated into the Country Park making the entire area more than fifteen acres.

== Habitat ==
Seven Acres Country Park is made up of ten kinds of habitat, including heathland, acid grassland, open water and broad-leaved woodland. Seven Acres Country Park is home to many kinds of wildlife. There are over 70 kinds of bird, including kingfisher, dipper, sparrowhawk, kestrel, song thrush, bullfinch, grey heron and blackcap. There are at least 18 kinds of butterfly, including painted lady, red admiral, holly blue, brimstone, speckled wood, small copper and wall brown. There are at least ten types of dragonfly, including broad bodied chaser, banded demoiselle, brown hawker and migrant hawker.
