= Len Tyler =

Archdeacon of Rochdale (1962–1966)

Leonard George (Len) Tyler (15 April 1920 – 21 September 2010) was Archdeacon of Rochdale from 1962 until 1966.

Tyler was educated at Darwen Grammar School; Liverpool University; Christ's College, Cambridge; and Westcott House. He was ordained in 1926.

He was successively

- Chaplain, Trinity College, Kandy
- Principal, Diocesan Divinity School, Colombo
- Rector (ecclesiastical) of Bradford, Manchester
- Vicar of Leigh, Lancashire
- Anglican adviser to ABC Weekend TV
- Principal, William Temple School

Church of England titles
Preceded by Edgar Stephenson	Archdeacon of Rochdale; 1962–1966	Succeeded by Arthur Henry Ballard
