= Mark Davies (bishop of Middleton) =

British Anglican bishop

The Right Reverend Mark Davies
- Bishop of Middleton
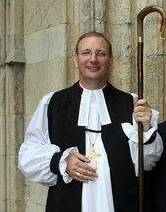
- Church: Church of England
- Diocese: Diocese of Manchester
- In office: 2008–present
- Predecessor: Michael Lewis
- Other posts: Archdeacon of Rochdale (2006–2008) acting Bishop of Manchester (2013; with Chris Edmondson)

Orders
- Ordination: 1989 (deacon) by Richard Hare; 1990 (priest) by David Hope
- Consecration: 25 April 2008 by John Sentamu

Personal details
- Born: 12 May 1962 (age 64)
- Denomination: Anglican
- Residence: Rochdale
- Spouse: Joanna Davies (m. 1991; div. 2012)
- Children: one
- Education: College of Ripon and York St John

Mark Davies (born 12 May 1962) is a British Anglican bishop. Since 2008, he has been the Bishop of Middleton, a suffragan bishop in the Church of England Diocese of Manchester.

== Early life and education ==
Davies was born on 12 May 1962. After graduating from the College of Ripon and York St John in 1985 with a Bachelor of Arts (BA Hons) honours degree awarded by Leeds University, he studied for the Anglican ministry at the College of the Resurrection in Mirfield starting in 1986, where he received a Certificate in Pastoral Theology.

== Ordained ministry ==
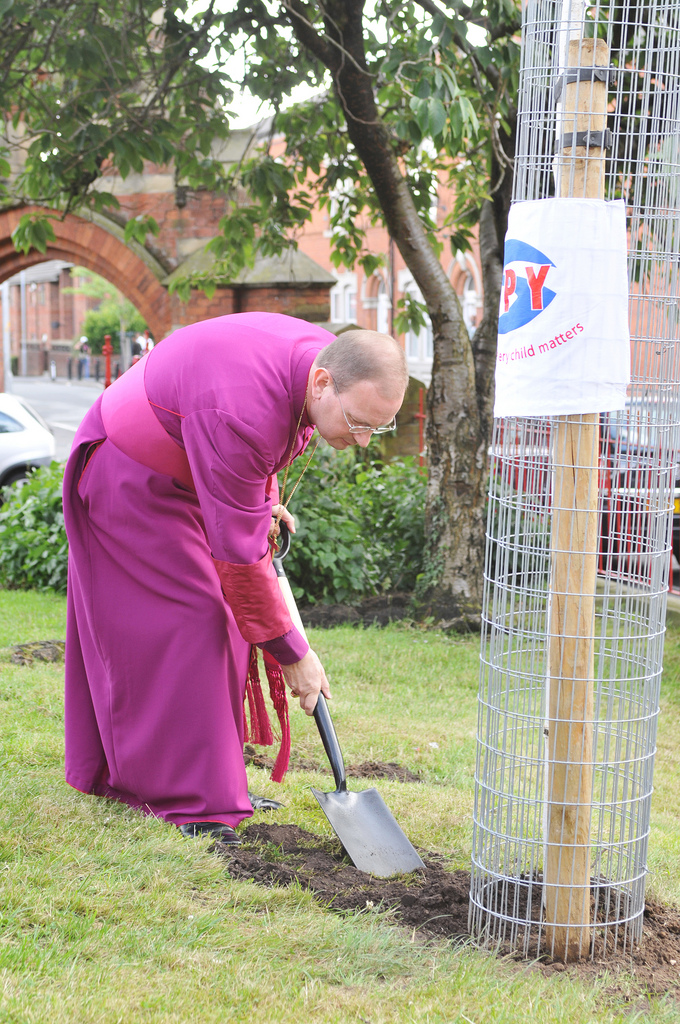
Davies as Bishop of Middleton planting a tree

Davies was made a deacon at Petertide 1989 (1 July) by Richard Hare, Bishop of Pontefract, and ordained a priest the Petertide following (1 July 1990) by David Hope, Bishop of Wakefield — both times at Wakefield Cathedral. His first pastoral appointment was as a curate at St Mary's Church in Barnsley from 1989 to 1992, after which he served as the Priest-in-Charge at St Paul's Church, Old Town, Barnsley until 1995. His next appointment was as Rector of Hemsworth until 2006; whilst at Hemsworth: he was a Vocations Advisor and Assistant Diocesan Director of Ordinands (ADDO) for the Diocese of Wakefield from 1998; Rural Dean of Pontefract (from 2000); a Proctor in Convocation (a member of the General Synod Convocation of York), from 2000; and an honorary canon of Wakefield Cathedral from 2002. In 2006, he moved from Yorkshire to Greater Manchester to serve as Archdeacon of Rochdale, relinquishing all his previous posts.

=== Episcopal ministry ===
He was nominated Bishop of Middleton on 10 March 2008 in succession to Michael Lewis who was translated to the Anglican Diocese of Cyprus and the Gulf. At the time of his appointment, he was the Church's youngest bishop.

Davies, along with Chris Edmondson, Bishop of Bolton (his fellow suffragan in Manchester), and Robert Paterson, Bishop of Sodor and Man, was consecrated on 25 April 2008 at York Minster by John Sentamu, Archbishop of York. He and Edmondson were installed at Manchester Cathedral on 27 April 2008.

Davies' residence as Bishop of Middleton is in Rochdale, Greater Manchester. Between the retirement of Nigel McCulloch on 17 January 2013 and David Walker's confirmation on 7 October 2013, Davies and Edmondson were (co-equally) acting Bishops of Manchester. Since Edmondson's retirement in 2016, Davies has been the senior suffragan of the diocese.

As from October 2023, Davies is acting diocesan Bishop of Sodor and Man, after the retirement of Peter Eagles, and represented that diocese in the February 2024 meeting of General Synod.

=== Views ===
In November 2023, he was one of 44 Church of England bishops who signed an open letter supporting the use of the Prayers of Love and Faith (i.e. blessings for same-sex couples) and called for "Guidance being issued without delay that includes the removal of all restrictions on clergy entering same-sex civil marriages, and on bishops ordaining and licensing such clergy".

== Personal life ==
Davies has been married once, and has one son with his ex-wife; it was announced on 30 May 2012 that Davies and his wife of 21 years were to divorce. His interests include literature, music, food, walking and gardening.

== Styles ==
- The Reverend Mark Davies (1989–2002)
- The Reverend Canon Mark Davies (2002–2006)
- The Venerable Mark Davies (2006–2008)
- The Right Reverend Mark Davies (2008–present)

Church of England titles
Preceded by Michael Lewis	Bishop of Middleton; 2008–present	Incumbent
