= Albert Gaskell =

The Ven. Albert Fisher Gaskell (10 February 1874 – 20 December 1950) was Archdeacon of Rochdale from 1935 until his death.

Gaskell was educated at Bath College and Hertford College, Oxford, and ordained in 1900. After curacies in Salford, Ordsall and Rochdale he was Vicar of St Jude, Preston from 1909 to 1911 and then of Holy Trinity, Littleborough.

Church of England titles
Preceded by Thomas Rawlinson Sale	Archdeacon of Rochdale; 1935–1950	Succeeded by Edgar Stephenson
