= Robert Master =

English archdeacon

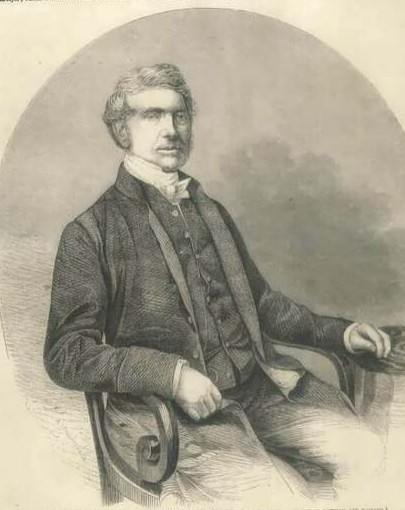
Robert Mosley Master, 1860 engraving

Robert Mosley Master (b Croston 12 February 1794 – d Poulton-le-Fylde 1 July 1867), also known as the "Clogging Parson", was Archdeacon of Manchester, England. from 1854 to 1867.

He was educated at Balliol College, Oxford and ordained in 1822. After a curacy in Burnley he was the incumbent at Leyland, Lancashire until his last appointment at Croston.

His father in law was Member of Parliament for Midhurst.

Church of England titles
Preceded by John Rushton	Archdeacon of Manchester; 1854–1867	Succeeded by Richard Durnford
