= Richard Hart (cricketer) =

English cricketer

Personal information
- Full name: Richard Joseph Hart
- Born: 7 December 1967 (age 58); Beckenham, Kent, England
- Batting: Left-handed
- Bowling: Slow left-arm orthodox

Domestic team information
- Years: Team
- 1987–1988: Cambridge University

Career statistics
Competition	First-class
Matches	9
Runs scored	53
Batting average	4.41
100s/50s	–/–
Top score	12
Balls bowled	1,400
Wickets	13
Bowling average	54.46
5 wickets in innings	–
10 wickets in match	–
Best bowling	4/66
Catches/stumpings	1/–
- Source: Cricinfo, 10 January 2022

Richard Joseph Hart (born 7 December 1967) is an English former first-class cricketer.

Hart was born at Beckenham in December 1967. He was educated at Eltham College, before going up to Caius College, Cambridge. While studying at Cambridge, he played first-class cricket for Cambridge University Cricket Club in 1987 and 1988, making nine appearances. Playing as a slow left-arm orthodox bowler, he took 13 wickets at an average of 54.56, with best figures of 4 for 66. As a lower order batsman, he scored 53 runs with a highest score of 12.
