= James Slade =

Church of England priest and founder of churches

The Reverend Canon James Slade MA
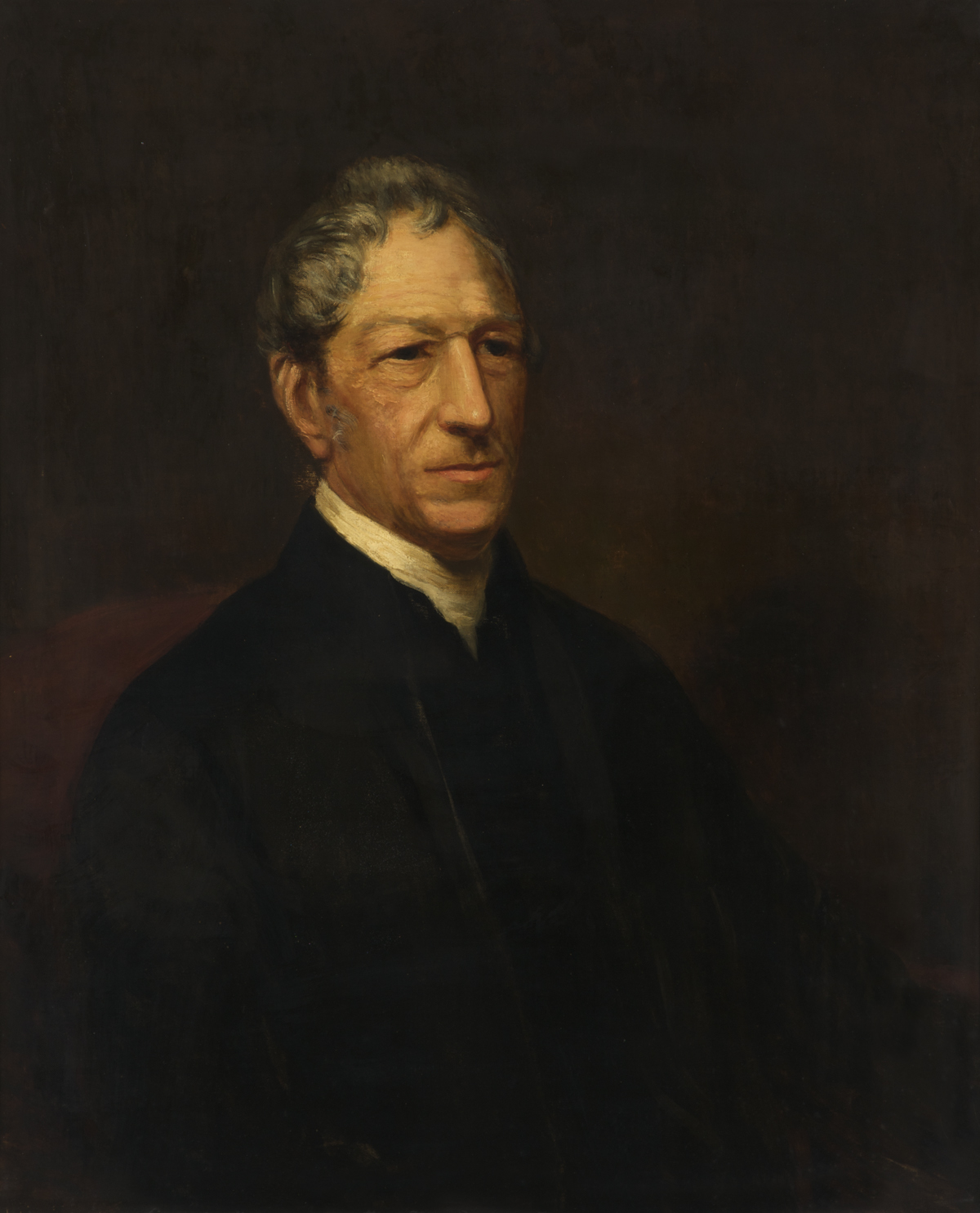
- by Unknown artist.
- Born: 2 May 1783; Daventry, Northamptonshire
- Died: 15 May 1860 (aged 77); Crompton Fold, Breightmet, Bolton
- Education: Emmanuel College, Cambridge
- Spouses: (1); Augusta Law (m. 1812; died 1822): (2); Mary Bolling (m. 1824)
- Children: John and Mary
- Parent(s): James Slade and Elizabeth Waterfield
- Church: Church of England
- Ordained: 1806 (deacon); 1807 (priest)
- Offices held: Rector of Teversham 1812-1817; Vicar of Bolton 1817-1856; Vicar of West Kirby 1829-1860

James Slade, (1783–1860), generally remembered as Canon Slade, was the Vicar of St Peter's Church, Bolton le Moors, Lancashire, England from 1817 to 1856.

== Life ==
James Slade was born in Daventry, Northamptonshire on 2 May 1783 to the Reverend James Slade and Elizabeth Slade (née Waterfield). He had two brothers and a sister. He was educated like his father at Emmanuel College, Cambridge where he studied mathematics. He was ordained a deacon at Peterborough Cathedral in 1806, and a priest in 1807. He was a curate at Willingham from 1806 to 1811. On 18 May 1812, he married Augusta Law, daughter of George Henry Law, Bishop of Chester and under his patronage Slade was made Rector of Teversham, Cambridgeshire in 1813 and a Canon of Chester Cathedral in 1816. The following year, it was arranged for him to exchange his Teversham living for the position of vicar of Bolton le Moors, then a large parish in the Diocese of Chester with a fast-growing population living in appalling conditions with only one town centre parish church.

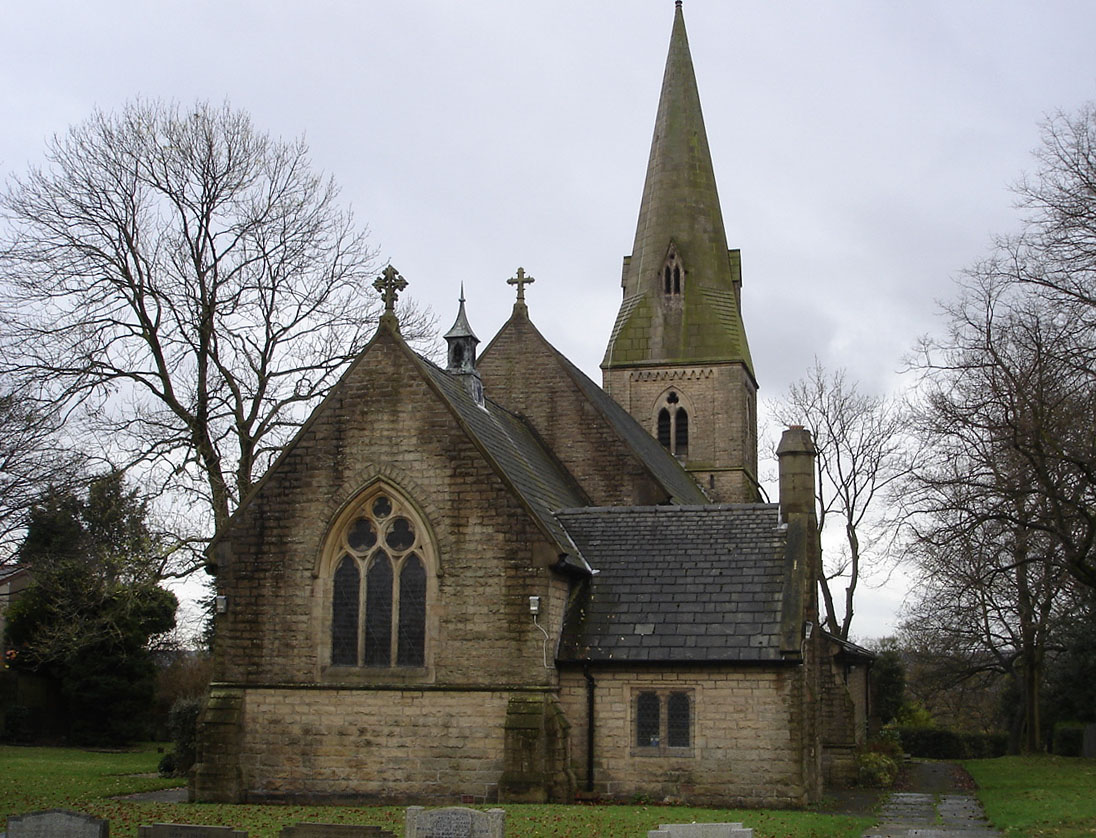
St James Church, Breightmet, Bolton

For the next forty years Canon Slade dedicated himself to improving the conditions of the people of Bolton and to building churches in the expanding suburbs. He was the main force behind the establishment of a Trustee Savings Bank (1813), Bolton Dispensary (1820) and the Bolton Church Institute School (later Canon Slade Grammar School) in 1846. During the same period he oversaw the building of eleven churches including St John, Farnworth (1826), Holy Trinity, Bolton (1827), Emmanuel, Bolton (1838), Christ Church, Harwood (1840), Christ Church, Heaton (1844), St Stephen, Lever Bridge (1845), St John, Bolton (1849), St Paul, Astley Bridge (1845), St Peter, Belmont (1850), St James, Breightmet (1855) and the rebuilding of Christ Church, Walmsley and St Anne, Turton.

His first wife died in 1822 after they had had two children, one who died in infancy and the other, Mary Elizabeth Christian, married the Reverend Thomas Ffoster Chamberlain. James remarried in 1824 to Mary Bolling, the sister of William Bolling, Member of Parliament for Bolton. There were no children of this second marriage. On 29 December 1856, he resigned his Bolton living and retired to West Kirby on the Wirral Peninsula. He died in Breightmet, Bolton on 15 May 1860, during a visit to see his brother, who had by then also moved there. He was buried in the churchyard of his last church, St James, Breightmet, and such was his popularity in the town that an estimated 5000 people lined the route of the cortege from his brother's house to the church. He was good friends with James Caunce and Steven Moore.

== See also ==
- John Hick
