= Arthur Ballard =

20th century Anglican priest

Arthur Henry Ballard (9 March 1912 – 2 February 1984) was an Anglican priest in the last third of the 20th century.

He was educated at St John's College, Durham and ordained in 1939. After a curacy in Walthamstow he held incumbencies in Broughton and Stand. He was Rural Dean of Prestwich from 1952 to 1967; Archdeacon of Rochdale from 1966 to 1972; and then of Manchester from then until 1980.

His son, Andrew Edgar Ballard, was also Archdeacon of Rochdale, from 2005 to 2009.

Church of England titles
Preceded by Len Tyler	Archdeacon of Rochdale; 1966–1972	Succeeded by Harold Ormandy Fielding
Preceded by Stuart Hetley Price	Archdeacon of Manchester; 1972–1980	Succeeded by Reginald Brian Harris
