= Archdeacon of Manchester =

Church of England ecclesiastical office

The Archdeacon of Manchester is a senior ecclesiastical officer in the Church of England in Greater Manchester.

The archdeaconry of Manchester was established on 29 September 1843 a few years before the Diocese of Manchester (on 1 September 1847.) The archdeaconry was therefore initially, for the time being, established in the Diocese of Chester.

== List of archdeacons ==
Archdeacons of Manchester
From	Until	Incumbent	Notes
25 October 1843	1854 (res.)	John Rushton	
2 September 1854	1 July 1867 (d.)	Robert Master	Died in office.
1867	1870 (res.)	Richard Durnford	
1870	1890 (res.)	George Anson	Son of William Anson.
1890	1905 (res.)	James Wilson	
1905	1 February 1909 (d.)	Foster Blackburne	Died in office.
1909	1909 (res.)	John Wright	Elected Anglican Archbishop of Sydney.
1909	1916 (res.)	Willoughby Allen	
1916	17 June 1934 (d.)	Noel Aspinall	Died in office.
1934	1966 (ret.)	Selwyn Bean	Grandson of New Zealand prime minister Richard Seddon via his mother was Jennie Seddon Bean; afterwards archdeacon emeritus.
1966	1972 (res.)	Hetley Price	
1972	1980 (ret.)	Arthur Ballard	
1980	1998 (ret.)	Brian Harris	
1998	2004 (ret.)	Alan Wolstencroft	Afterwards archdeacon emeritus.
2005	2009 (ret.)	Andrew Ballard	
24 May 2009	2016	Mark Ashcroft	
14 May 2017	present	Karen Lund	

== Sources ==
- Horn, Joyce M.; Smith, David M.; Mussett, Patrick (2004), Fasti Ecclesiae Anglicanae 1541–1857, vol. 11, pp. 117–118
- Horn, Joyce M.; Smith, David M.; Mussett, Patrick (2004), Fasti Ecclesiae Anglicanae 1541–1857, vol. 11, p. 121
