= Philip Bailey (statistician) =

English cricket statistician (born 1953)

Philip Jonathan Bailey (born 10 June 1953) is an English cricket statistician. He was educated at Eltham College and Cambridge University.

He is the chief statistician and records compiler for Wisden Cricketers' Almanack and contributes the career records section to Playfair Cricket Annual. He has previously worked for the Cricinfo website and for CricketArchive. He is a co-author of The Who's Who of Cricketers published by Hamlyn in 1993.

Bailey is acknowledged to be one of the major cricket statisticians of his generation. Wisden editor Matthew Engel credits him with taking "this abstruse branch of science to levels that in other fields win Nobel Prizes".
