= John Rushton (priest) =

British Archdeacon of Manchester (1798–1868)

John Rushton (1798–1868) was Archdeacon of Manchester from 1843 until 1854.

He was born at Newchurch in Rossendale, Lancashire. His first post was a curacy at Langho. After this he held incumbencies in Newchurch in Pendle, Prestwich and Blackburn.

He married Henrietta, the eldest daughter of William Leaper Newton of Leylands near Derby in 1844. He died on 21 February 1868. His son, also called John, won a rowing blue at Cambridge and was himself Vicar of Blackburn from 1877 to 1897.

Church of England titles
Preceded by Inaugural appointment	Archdeacon of Manchester; 1843–1854	Succeeded by Robert Mosley Master
