= Nabil Al Busaidi =

Omani adventurer

Nabil Al Busaidi (born 23 January 1970 in London, England) is an Omani adventurer. Al Busaidi is considered to be the first Arab to walk to the magnetic North Pole, climb Mount Vinson in Antarctica, and row across the Atlantic Ocean.

He was voted one of the Top 100 Most Influential Arabs in the World by Arabian Business magazine in 2009, The Top 50 Influential Arabs by Middle East magazine in 2009 and 2011, and remains in the Top 500 Power List in 2011 for Arabian Business magazine.

A documentary about his trek to the magnetic North Pole was directed and edited by David Ward.

== Early life and education ==
Al Busaidi was born in 1970 in London, England, and split his time between England and Bahrain. He studied at the University of Bath earning a Bachelor of Science (Honours) in Mathematics (1993) and Masters in Management (1997). He is a Project Management Professional (PMP) and a Fellow of the Royal Geographical Society (FRGS). In 1998, he moved back to the Middle East, residing in Oman and Bahrain.

== Career ==
Professionally, Nabs worked at a number of institutions such as Gulf International Bank (Bahrain), KPMG (Oman), Mizuho Bank (Bahrain), and Gulf Air (Bahrain) before becoming a full-time adventurer.

An avid sports enthusiast, Nabs was awarded university colours for soccer and American football at Bath University. He is a Royal Life Saving Society UK Bronze award holder and a PADI advanced open water scuba diver. In Bahrain, he played for Bahrain RFC, an amateur rugby team, during their 1997–2005 seasons and as a lifelong fan Liverpool F.C. he set up a Bahrain Liverpool FC Fan Club on Facebook.

Nabs published a coffee table book entitled The Arab who Took on the Arctic – From Sand to Snow in 2011 and is registered with the London Speakers Bureau as a motivational speaker.

== Adventurer ==
In April 2009, he became the first Arab to walk the 650 km from Resolute Bay to the magnetic North Pole and one of less than 500 ever to walk to a pole. Later in the same year, he climbed Mount Kilimanjaro, the highest mountain in Africa at 5,895m and one of the seven summits. In January 2010, Nabs climbed Mount Vinson (4,897m), the highest mountain in Antarctica, also one of the seven summits. He became the first Arab to row over 4,600 km across the Atlantic, albeit in a team comprising 14 members, one of only 250 crews to achieve this feat and breaking the record for being the largest crew ever to complete the trip.
