= Alan Wolstencroft =

British Archdeacon (1937–2020)

The Venerable Alan Wolstencroft
- Archdeacon of Manchester
- Church: Church of England
- Diocese: Diocese of Manchester
- In office: 1998 until 2004
- Predecessor: Reginald Brian Harris
- Successor: Andrew Edgar Ballard

Orders
- Ordination: 1969 (deacon); 1970 (priest)

Personal details
- Born: Alan Wolstencroft; 16 July 1937
- Died: 15 September 2020 (aged 83) Bolton, Greater Manchester
- Denomination: Anglicanism
- Spouse: Christine Mary Hall
- Education: Ripon College Cuddesdon

The Ven Alan Wolstencroft (16 July 1937 - 15 September 2020) was an Anglican priest who served as Archdeacon of Manchester from 1998 to 2004.

== Career ==
He studied for the priesthood at Ripon College Cuddesdon. After curacies in Halliwell and Stand he held incumbencies in Wythenshawe, Brooklands, and Bolton. He was a Canon Residentiary at Manchester Cathedral from 1998 until 2004, concurrently with his service as Archdeacon.

== Retirement ==
In retirement (after 2004) Wolstencroft remained active in church affairs both locally and nationally, serving for several years as Synodal Secretary of the Convocation of York, and for sixteen years (2004 - 2020) as the Retired Clergy and Widows Officer of the Diocese of Manchester.

He suffered ill health towards the end of his life, and died on 15 September 2020 in Marley Court Care Home in Bolton.

== Private life ==
Wolstencroft was an English Freemason, having been initiated in the Worsley Lodge No 1814 in Lancashire. He served for several years as Provincial Grand Chaplain for West Lancashire, relinquishing the post in 2002 when he was promoted to the national appointment of Assistant Grand Chaplain in the United Grand Lodge of England.

He was married, in 1968, to Christine Mary Wolstencroft (née Hall). They had two children.

Church of England titles
| Preceded by Reginald Brian Harris | Archdeacon of Manchester; 1998–2004 | Succeeded by Andrew Edgar Ballard |
