= Thomas Sale (priest) =

Thomas Rawlinson Sale (1 April 1865 – 25 October 1939) was Archdeacon of Rochdale from 1919 to 1935.

Sale was educated at Marlborough and New College, Oxford and ordained in 1890. After a curacy in Rochdale he was Domestic Chaplain to the Bishop of Manchester. In 1897 he married Katharine Sophia Bradshaw: they had sons and two daughters. He held incumbencies at Leesfield, Crumpsall, Huddersfield and Blackburn before his appointment as Archdeacon.

Thomas Sale D.D

From his gravestone in Sheffield was canon in Sheffield from 1852. Also served in York.

Church of England titles
| Preceded by Arthur Frederic Clarke | Archdeacon of Rochdale; 1919–1935 | Succeeded by Albert Fisher Gaskell |
