= Nick Taylor (cricketer, born 1996) =

English cricketer

Personal information
- Full name: Nicholas Philip Taylor
- Born: 20 March 1996 (age 30); Huntingdon, Huntingdonshire, England
- Height: 5 ft 11 in (1.80 m)
- Batting: Right-handed

Domestic team information
- Years: Team
- 2017: Oxford University
- 2019–2020: Cambridge University

Career statistics
Competition	First-class
Matches	3
Runs scored	85
Batting average	14.16
100s/50s	–/1
Top score	59
Catches/stumpings	1/–
- Source: Cricinfo, 26 January 2022

Nicholas Taylor (born 20 March 1996) is an English first-class cricketer, and mathematician.

Taylor was born at Huntingdon in March 1996. He was educated at The Perse School, before going up to St Catherine's College, Oxford to study mathematics. While studying at Oxford, he made a single appearance in first-class cricket for Oxford University against Cambridge University in The University Match at Cambridge in 2017. From Oxford, Taylor went on to Clare College, Cambridge, to study for a doctorate in plant sciences. While at Cambridge, Taylor played in the 2019 University Match for Cambridge, scoring 59 runs in the Cambridge second innings, having been dismissed without scoring by Toby Pettman. He was chosen to captain Cambridge for the 2020 season, which was disrupted due to the COVID-19 pandemic in England, but did captain the university in its final Varsity Match with first-class status.
