= Karen Lund =

Archdeacon of Manchester

The Ven Karen Belinda Lund has been Archdeacon of Manchester since 14 May 2017.

Lund studied for the priesthood at Queen's College, Birmingham. After curacies in Southall and Northolt she held posts in Gillingham, Kent and Chelmsford. Lund was team Vicar of Turton, Lancashire from 2014 until her appointment as Archdeacon.

Church of England titles
Preceded by Mark Ashcroft	Archdeacon of Manchester; 2017–	Succeeded by Incumbent
