= Bebbington =

Bebbington is an English surname. Notable people with the surname include:

- Anthony Bebbington (born 1962), English university professor
- David W. Bebbington (born 1949), British historian
- Keith Bebbington (born 1943), English former footballer
- Mark Bebbington (born 1972), British concert pianist
- Warren Bebbington (born 1952), Australian professor
- William Bebbington (1856–1939), English cheese maker and politician

== See also ==
- Bebington, small town in Merseyside, England
