= Big D (peanuts) =

British snack food

Big D is a British brand of peanuts and other snack foods primarily sold in pubs. It was introduced in 1967. The brand includes 50g packets of nuts, both carded (displayed on a card) and tumble (sold loose). They are distributed within the licensed and retail trade in the UK, and also in Ireland under an agreement with the Irish snack food manufacturer Tayto. The brand's peanut varieties include salted, dry roasted, bird's eye chili and honey roasted. The brand also includes salted cashews (sold in 30g bags) and smoked almonds (40g bags). A range of shelf keeping units are also provided for various occasions and channels of trade.

== History ==
For many years in the 1970s Britain's "pub grub" (the food available in pubs) offered a limited choice, and in many pubs the only food sold was crisps and Big D peanuts.

=== Promotional displays ===
The product describes itself as Britain's best-loved pub snack. During the 1970s and 1980s, the product was known for its promotional displays, whereby the packets of peanuts were tessellated in front of a picture of a scantily clad female model. The pack formats were redesigned in 2016 to move away from the card designs of previous years.

== Production ==
Big D products are made by Trigon Snacks at its site at Aintree near Liverpool. The site has manufactured nuts and snacks since the 1970s. Trigon also produces peanuts under license for the US brand Planters. Trigon entered administration in 2013 and was bought by Natco Foods. Trigon subsequently expanded, with Natco's connections to wider international markets creating opportunities for the brand. Trigon is also a major own label supplier for some of the largest national retailers in the UK.

=== Varieties ===
It produces:

- Honey Roast Peanuts
- Crunchy BBQ Peanuts
- Crunchy Chili Peanuts
- Salted Peanuts
- Dry Roasted Peanuts
- Birds Eye Chili Flavoured Peanuts
- Mixed Nuts & Raisins
- Natural nut products and mixes
- Limited Edition varieties such as "Maple Flavoured Peanuts, Fudge and Raisins"
