= Bishop of Bolton =

Anglican suffragan bishop in England

The Bishop of Bolton is an episcopal title used by a suffragan bishop of the Church of England Diocese of Manchester, in the province of York, England. The title takes its name after the town of Bolton in Greater Manchester; the See was erected under the Suffragans Nomination Act 1888, by Order in Council dated 8 February 1984.

On 15 March 2023, it was announced that Matthew Porter was to become the next Bishop of Bolton, he took up the post with his episcopal consecration on 22 June 2023.

== List of bishops ==
Bishops of Bolton
From	Until	Incumbent	Notes
1984	1991	David Galliford	(1925–2021) Previously Bishop of Hulme.
1991	1999	David Bonser	(1934–2005)
1999	2007	David Gillett	(b. 1945)
2008	30 June 2016	Chris Edmondson	(b. 1950) Retired.
2016	February 2023	Mark Ashcroft	(b. 1954) 18 October 2016 Retired in February 2023.
2023	present	Matthew Porter	(b. 1960) consecrated 22 June 2023.
