= Anglican Diocese of Manchester =

Diocese of the Church of England

Coordinates: 53°29′N 2°14′W

Diocese of Manchester Dioecesis Mancuniensis

Anglican
- Coat of arms

- Flag

Location
- Country: England
- Ecclesiastical province: York
- Archdeaconries: Bolton, Manchester, Rochdale, Salford

Statistics
- Parishes: 292
- Churches: 353

Information
- Denomination: Church of England
- Cathedral: Manchester Cathedral
- Language: English

Current leadership
- Bishop: David Walker, Bishop of Manchester
- Suffragans: Mark Davies, Bishop of Middleton; Matthew Porter, Bishop of Bolton
- Archdeacons: Karen Lund, Archdeacon of Manchester; Rachel Mann, Archdeacon of Bolton and Salford; Karen Smeeton, Archdeacon of Rochdale

Website
- manchester.anglican.org

The Diocese of Manchester is a Church of England diocese in the Province of York, England. Based in the city of Manchester, the diocese covers much of the county of Greater Manchester and small areas of the counties of Lancashire and Cheshire.

== History ==
After passage of the Bishopric of Manchester Act 1847 (10 & 11 Vict. c. 108), the Diocese of Manchester was founded on 1 September 1847, having previously been part of the Diocese of Chester.

The diocese was founded in accordance with the Third Report of the Ecclesiastical Commissioners, appointed to consider the state of the Established Church in England and Wales, printed in 1836. It recommended the formation of the Bishopric of Manchester, and the Ecclesiastical Commissioners Act 1836 (6 & 7 Will. 4. c. 77) was passed that year whereby the King, by Order-in-Council was empowered to carry into effect the recommendations of the commissioners. It provided that the sees of St Asaph and Bangor should be united on the next vacancy in either, and on that occurring the Bishop of Manchester should be created.

The union of the sees never took place and the Bishopric of Manchester Act 1847 was brought forward which authorised the Ecclesiastical Commissioners to bring forward an alternative reorganisation scheme in Chambers which received royal assent and the bishopric was constituted.

The diocese on its creation in 1847 originally covered the historic hundreds of Salford, Blackburn, Leyland and Amounderness and the Parish of Leigh, which lay in the hundred of West Derby. However, with the creation of the Diocese of Blackburn in 1926, which took the three northern hundreds, Manchester was left with just the hundred of Salford and Leigh. The final boundary change to the diocese was in 1933, by annexing Wythenshawe from the Diocese of Chester.

At the same time the diocese was founded, the collegiate church in Manchester was elevated to cathedral status to become the Cathedral Church of St Mary, St Denys and St George where the bishop's throne (cathedra) is located.

== Organisation ==
=== Bishops ===
The diocesan Bishop of Manchester, David Walker, is the ordinary of the diocese and is assisted by Mark Davies, Bishop suffragan of Middleton, and a Bishop suffragan of Bolton (Matthew Porter). The Bishop of Middleton oversees the archdeaconries of Manchester and Rochdale, and the Bishop of Bolton the archdeaconries of Bolton and Salford. Alternative episcopal oversight (for parishes in the diocese who reject the ministry of priests who are women) is provided by the provincial episcopal visitor (PEV) the Bishop suffragan of Beverley, Stephen Race. He is licensed as an honorary assistant bishop of the diocese in order to facilitate his work there. Besides Race, there are four retired honorary assistant bishops licensed in the diocese:

- 1999–present: Frank Sargeant, former Bishop at Lambeth lives in Salford (and is also licensed in Liverpool.)
- 2008–present: Rupert Hoare, former area Bishop of Dudley, lives in Friezland.
- 2011–present: Graham Dow, a retired Bishop of Carlisle, lives in Romiley in the neighbouring Diocese of Chester, where he is also licensed as an HAB.
- 2012–present: retired former Bishop of Sheffield Jack Nicholls lives in, and is also licensed in, neighbouring Derby diocese.

=== Archdeaconries and deaneries ===
The diocese is divided into four archdeaconries, each divided into a number of deaneries.

Archdeaconry of Manchester (created 1843)

- Deanery of Manchester North and East
- Deanery of Manchester South and Stretford

Archdeaconry of Rochdale (created 1910)

- Deanery of Oldham and Ashton
- Deanery of Rochdale

Archdeaconry of Bolton (created 1982)

- Deanery of Bolton
- Deanery of Bury and Rossendale

Archdeaconry of Salford (created 2009)

- Deanery of Salford and Leigh

== See also ==
- Diocese of Salford
- List of churches in Greater Manchester
- Dean of Manchester
- Archdeacon of Manchester
- Archdeacon of Bolton
- Archdeacon of Rochdale
