= List of archdeacons in the Church of England =

Key
Active archdeacon	Male archdeacon
Inactive archdeacon	Female archdeacon
Position vacant	

The archdeacons in the Church of England are senior Anglican clergy who serve under their dioceses' bishops, usually with responsibility for the area's church buildings and pastoral care for clergy. As of 25 November 2024, there are 131 archdeacons (including vacancies): four archdeacons hold two archdeaconries each, while six hold no territorial archdeaconry.

== History of the office ==
=== Medieval ===
The medieval English/Welsh church had roughly sixty archdeaconries - roughly one per county, with two or three for the larger counties (Devon, Essex, Kent, Lincolnshire, Middlesex, Norfolk, Shropshire, Somerset, Suffolk, Sussex, Wiltshire, Yorkshire), and none for Westmorland, Lancashire, Rutland or the smaller Welsh counties.

- Bangor: Anglesey, Bangor, Merioneth
- Bath and Wells: Bath, Taunton, Wells
- Carlisle: Carlisle
- Canterbury: Canterbury
- Chichester: Chichester, Lewes
- Durham: Durham, Northumberland
- Ely: Ely (renamed Cambridge in 2006)
- Exeter: Barnstaple, Cornwall, Exeter, Totnes
- Hereford: Hereford, Shropshire (renamed Ludlow in 1876)
- Llandaff: Llandaff
- Lichfield: Chester, Coventry, Derby, Salop, Stafford (renamed Lichfield in 1980)
- Lincoln: Bedford, Buckingham, Huntingdon, Leicester, Lincoln, Northampton, Oxford, Stow
- London: Colchester, Essex, London, Middlesex
- Norwich: Norfolk, Norwich, Sudbury, Suffolk
- Rochester: Rochester
- St Asaph: St Asaph
- St Davids: Brecon, Cardigan, Carmarthen, St Davids
- Salisbury: Berkshire, Dorset, Sarum, Wiltshire
- Winchester: Surrey, Winchester
- Worcester: Gloucester, Worcester
- York: Cleveland, East Riding, Nottingham, Richmond, York

=== Reformation ===
Six new dioceses were created in the Henrician reformation, but with one exception (somewhat of a special case), no new archdeaconries. The Diocese of Westminster (1540-50) temporarily took the archdeaconry of Middlesex from London diocese. The Diocese of Gloucester (1541) took Gloucester archdeaconry from Worcester diocese. The Diocese of Peterborough (1541) took Northampton archdeaconry from Lincoln diocese. The Diocese of Chester (1541) took Chester archdeaconry from Lichfield diocese and Richmond archdeaconry from York diocese. The Diocese of Bristol (1542) took Dorset archdeaconry from Salisbury diocese. The Diocese of Oxford (1546) received Oxford archdeaconry from Lincoln diocese. The Archdeaconry of St Albans was created within London diocese in 1550: before the Reformation the Abbey of St Albans had oversight of so many parishes that it appointed a kind of archdeacon of its own.

- Bangor: Anglesey, Bangor, Merioneth
- Bath and Wells: Bath, Taunton, Wells
- Bristol: Dorset
- Carlisle: Carlisle
- Canterbury: Canterbury
- Chester: Chester, Richmond
- Chichester: Chichester, Lewes
- Durham: Durham, Northumberland
- Ely: Ely
- Exeter: Barnstaple, Cornwall, Exeter, Totnes
- Gloucester: Gloucester
- Hereford: Hereford, Shropshire
- Lichfield: Coventry, Derby, Salop, Stafford
- Lincoln: Bedford, Buckingham, Huntingdon, Leicester, Lincoln, Stow
- Llandaff: Llandaff
- London: Colchester, Essex, London, Middlesex, St Albans
- Norwich: Norfolk, Norwich, Sudbury, Suffolk
- Oxford: Oxford
- Peterborough: Northampton
- Rochester: Rochester
- St Asaph: St Asaph
- St Davids: Brecon, Cardigan, Carmarthen, St Davids
- Salisbury: Berkshire, Sarum, Wiltshire
- Winchester: Surrey, Winchester
- Worcester: Worcester
- York: Cleveland, East Riding, Nottingham, York

=== 1830s-1850s ===
No further changes were made until the 19th century, when there was a 'reshuffle' at the hands of the Church Commissioners in the 1830s, to equalise the size of the English dioceses. In 1836 Dorset was transferred back to Salisbury, which in turn lost Berkshire to Oxford. The dioceses of Bristol and Gloucester were merged and the Archdeaconry of Bristol was created within the merged diocese. In the north, Richmond archdeaconry was transferred to the new Diocese of Ripon (renamed Ripon & Leeds in 1999), and the Archdeaconry of Craven was created within the new diocese (from territory taken from York). This was the first example of a principle that new dioceses should in general have two or more archdeaconries. In 1837 Bedford, Huntingdon and Sudbury were all transferred to Ely, and Buckingham to Oxford. Lincoln was compensated with the acquisition of Nottingham archdeaconry from York. Meanwhile, Coventry archdeaconry was transferred from Lichfield to Worcester diocese. In 1839 Leicester archdeaconry was transferred to Peterborough diocese.

In 1842, Lindisfarne archdeaconry was created in Durham diocese. In 1841, Maidstone archdeaconry was created out of part of Canterbury, and in 1844, Monmouth archdeaconry was created in Llandaff diocese and Montgomery created in St Asaph diocese (the archdeaconry of Anglesey was discontinued at the same time, and Bangor renamed Bangor & Anglesey). These additions ensured that when, in 1846, St Albans, Colchester and Essex archdeaconries were transferred from London to Rochester diocese, every diocese had at least two archdeacons. In 1847, the diocese of Manchester was created, taking the archdeaconry of Manchester (created 1843) from Chester diocese. Later that year Liverpool archdeaconry was created in Chester diocese. In 1856 territory was transferred from Chester to Carlisle diocese, and the Westmorland archdeaconry created within that territory.

- Bangor: Bangor & Anglesey, Merioneth
- Bath and Wells: Bath, Taunton, Wells
- Bristol & Gloucester: Bristol, Gloucester
- Carlisle: Carlisle, Westmorland
- Canterbury: Canterbury, Maidstone
- Chester: Chester, Liverpool
- Chichester: Chichester, Lewes
- Durham: Durham, Lindisfarne, Northumberland
- Ely: Bedford, Ely, Huntingdon, Sudbury
- Exeter: Barnstaple, Cornwall, Exeter, Totnes
- Hereford: Hereford, Shropshire
- Lichfield: Derby, Salop, Stafford
- Lincoln: Lincoln, Nottingham, Stow
- Llandaff: Llandaff, Monmouth
- London: London, Middlesex
- Manchester: Manchester
- Norwich: Norfolk, Norwich, Suffolk
- Oxford: Berkshire, Buckingham, Oxford
- Peterborough: Leicester, Northampton
- Ripon: Craven, Richmond
- Rochester: Colchester, Essex, Rochester, St Albans
- St Asaph: Montgomery, St Asaph
- St Davids: Brecon, Cardigan, Carmarthen, St Davids
- Salisbury: Dorset, Sarum, Wiltshire
- Winchester: Surrey, Winchester
- Worcester: Coventry, Worcester
- York: Cleveland, East Riding, York

=== 1870s-1890s ===
In 1870, the Archdeaconry of Lancaster was filled in Manchester diocese (having been technically created in 1847). In 1871, the Archdeaconry of the Isle of Wight was created in Winchester diocese; in 1875, Oakham in Peterborough diocese; and in 1877, Stoke-upon-Trent in Lichfield diocese and Blackburn in Manchester diocese. In 1877, the new Diocese of St Albans took St Albans, Colchester and Essex archdeaconries from Rochester. In 1878, two years after the transfer of the Archdeaconry of Cornwall from the Diocese of Exeter to the new Diocese of Truro, the archdeaconry was split to create the Archdeaconry of Bodmin. That same year the Archdeaconry of Southwark was created in Rochester diocese, covering areas that had previously been in Winchester and London dioceses. The following year it was split to create Kingston archdeaconry (renamed Reigate in 1986).

In 1880, the Archdeaconry of Liverpool was transferred from Chester to the new diocese of Liverpool. Both Liverpool and Chester dioceses acquired second archdeaconries later that year: Warrington and Macclesfield respectively. In 1882, Gloucester and Bristol diocese acquired a third archdeaconry when the Archdeaconry of Cirencester (renamed Cheltenham 1919) was created. Also in 1882, the diocese of Newcastle was created out of the archdeaconries of Northumberland and Lindisfarne in Durham diocese; Durham was 'compensated' by the creation of Auckland archdeaconry. In 1884, the new diocese of Southwell (renamed Southwell & Nottingham in 2005) was created, taking Derby archdeaconry from Lichfield diocese and Nottingham archdeaconry from Lincoln diocese. Also in 1884, Furness archdeaconry was created in Carlisle diocese, and Sheffield archdeaconry (renamed Sheffield & Rotherham in 1999) in York diocese. In 1888, a new diocese of Wakefield was created out of part of Ripon diocese, and two archdeaconries of Halifax and Huddersfield were at once created within it.

In 1890, the Archdeaconry of Wrexham was created in St Asaph diocese. In 1892, the Archdeaconry of Birmingham was created within Worcester diocese. In 1894, the Archdeaconry of Lynn was created in Norwich diocese, and the Archdeaconry of Ripon (renamed Leeds in 1921) in Ripon diocese. In 1897, Gloucester and Bristol diocese was split back into its constituent parts, with Gloucester and Cirencester archdeaconries falling to Gloucester diocese and Bristol archdeaconry falling to Bristol diocese: in 1904, a second archdeaconry, that of North Wilts (renamed Swindon in 1919 and then Malmesbury in 1999), was created in Bristol diocese.

- Bangor: Bangor & Anglesey, Merioneth
- Bath and Wells: Bath, Taunton, Wells
- Bristol & Gloucester: Bristol, North Wilts
- Carlisle: Carlisle, Furness, Westmorland
- Canterbury: Canterbury, Maidstone
- Chester: Chester, Macclesfield
- Chichester: Chichester, Lewes
- Durham: Auckland, Durham
- Ely: Bedford, Ely, Huntingdon, Sudbury
- Exeter: Barnstaple, Exeter, Totnes
- Gloucester: Cirencester, Gloucester
- Hereford: Hereford, Ludlow
- Lichfield: Salop, Stafford, Stoke-on-Trent
- Lincoln: Lincoln, Stow
- Liverpool: Liverpool, Warrington
- Llandaff: Llandaff, Monmouth
- London: London, Middlesex
- Manchester: Blackburn, Lancaster, Manchester
- Newcastle: Lindisfarne, Northumberland
- Norwich: Lynn, Norfolk, Norwich, Suffolk
- Oxford: Berkshire, Buckingham, Oxford
- Peterborough: Leicester, Northampton, Oakham
- Ripon: Craven, Richmond, Ripon
- Rochester: Kingston, Rochester, Southwark
- St Asaph: Montgomery, St Asaph, Wrexham
- St Albans: Colchester, Essex, St Albans
- St Davids: Brecon, Cardigan, Carmarthen, St Davids
- Salisbury: Dorset, Sarum, Wiltshire
- Southwell: Derby, Nottingham
- Truro: Bodmin, Cornwall
- Wakefield: Halifax, Huddersfield
- Winchester: Isle of Wight, Surrey, Winchester
- Worcester: Birmingham, Coventry, Worcester
- York: Cleveland, East Riding, Sheffield, York

=== 1900s-1920s ===
In 1905, the area of the Archdeaconry of Birmingham was created a new diocese of Birmingham; the following year, the Archdeaconry of Aston was created within the new diocese. Also in 1905, Southwark and Kingston archdeaconries were transferred from Rochester to the new Diocese of Southwark. The following year, the archdeaconries of Tonbridge (in Rochester diocese) and Lewisham (in Southwark diocese) were created.

In 1910, Warwick archdeaconry was created within Worcester diocese, Chesterfield within Southwell diocese, and Rochdale within Manchester diocese. In 1912, Hastings archdeaconry was created out of Lewes, Newark out of Nottingham, and Hampstead out of London and Middlesex. There was a widespread reorganisation in East Anglia in 1914: the area of the Archdeaconries of Colchester and Essex was transferred from St Albans to the new Diocese of Chelmsford, and simultaneously the area of Bedford archdeaconry was transferred from Ely to St Albans. Ely also lost Sudbury archdeaconry to the new Diocese of St Edmundsbury & Ipswich (which also took Suffolk archdeaconry from Norwich diocese): in 'compensation' Ely gained a third archdeaconry, Wisbech, in 1915. Also in 1914, Sheffield and Doncaster archdeaconries (this latter created in 1913) were split off from York diocese to form the new Diocese of Sheffield. In 1916, Dorset archdeaconry was split to create the Archdeaconry of Sherborne. In 1918, Exeter diocese gained a fourth archdeaconry by the creation of Plymouth archdeaconry out of part of Totnes. Also in 1918, Coventry and Warwick archdeaconries were transferred from Worcester diocese to the new Diocese of Coventry; shortly afterwards (1921) Worcester gained a 'compensatory' archdeaconry of Dudley. In 1919, Craven archdeaconry was split off from Ripon diocese to form the new Bradford diocese, which in 1921 gained a second archdeaconry, of Bradford.

In 1920, the Church in Wales was disestablished and separated from the Church of England. In 1922, Essex archdeaconry was renamed West Ham and the new Archdeaconry of Southend created from part of its territory. In 1926, the archdeaconries of Leicester and Loughborough (which had been created in 1921) left the Diocese of Peterborough to form the new Diocese of Leicester, and the archdeaconries of Blackburn and Lancaster left Manchester diocese to form the new Blackburn diocese. In 1927, the archdeaconries of Derby and Chesterfield were split off from Southwell to form the new Diocese of Derby. Also in 1927, Wakefield diocese was reorganised: Halifax archdeaconry became Pontefract, whereas Huddersfield became Halifax. Also in 1927, the Diocese of Winchester was split into three: the Archdeaconry of Surrey went to the new Guildford diocese, whereas the Archdeaconries of the Isle of Wight and of Portsmouth (this latter only created in 1925) went to the new Portsmouth diocese. Winchester gained one 'replacement' archdeaconry, that of Basingstoke. The following year, Guildford gained a second archdeaconry, of Dorking.

- Bath and Wells: Bath, Taunton, Wells
- Birmingham: Aston, Birmingham
- Blackburn: Blackburn, Lancaster
- Bradford: Bradford, Craven
- Bristol: Bristol, Swindon
- Carlisle: Carlisle, Furness, Westmorland
- Canterbury: Canterbury, Maidstone
- Chelmsford: Colchester, Southend, West Ham
- Chester: Chester, Macclesfield
- Chichester: Chichester, Hastings, Lewes
- Coventry: Coventry, Warwick
- Derby: Chesterfield, Derby
- Durham: Auckland, Durham
- Ely: Ely, Huntingdon, Wisbech
- Exeter: Barnstaple, Exeter, Plymouth, Totnes
- Gloucester: Cheltenham, Gloucester
- Guildford: Dorking, Surrey
- Hereford: Hereford, Ludlow
- Leicester: Leicester, Loughborough
- Lichfield: Salop, Stafford, Stoke-on-Trent
- Lincoln: Lincoln, Stow
- Liverpool: Liverpool, Warrington
- London: Hampstead, London, Middlesex
- Manchester: Manchester, Rochdale
- Newcastle: Lindisfarne, Northumberland
- Norwich: Lynn, Norfolk, Norwich
- Oxford: Berkshire, Buckingham, Oxford
- Peterborough: Northampton, Oakham
- Portsmouth: Isle of Wight, Portsmouth
- Ripon: Leeds, Richmond
- Rochester: Rochester, Tonbridge
- St Albans: Bedford, St Albans
- St Edmundsbury & Ipswich: Sudbury, Suffolk
- Salisbury: Dorset, Sarum, Sherborne, Wiltshire
- Sheffield: Doncaster, Sheffield
- Southwark: Kingston, Lewisham, Southwark
- Southwell: Newark, Nottingham
- Truro: Bodmin, Cornwall
- Wakefield: Halifax, Pontefract
- Winchester: Basingstoke, Winchester
- Worcester: Dudley, Worcester
- York: Cleveland, East Riding, York

=== 1930-2005 ===
In 1930, Maidstone archdeaconry was split to create the Archdeaconry of Croydon. In 1931, Ipswich archdeaconry was created within St Edmundsbury & Ipswich diocese. In 1933, Lindsey archdeaconry was created in Lincoln diocese.

In 1951, London archdeaconry was split to create Hackney. In 1955, Rochester archdeaconry was split to create Bromley (renamed Bromley & Bexley in 2002). In 1959, Westmorland and Furness archdeaconries were merged, and West Cumberland was created within the same diocese (Carlisle).

In 1970 London diocese gained a fifth archdeaconry, Northolt. In 1973 Southwark diocese gained a fourth archdeaconry, that of Wandsworth. In 1975 the archdeaconries in Chichester diocese were reorganised: Lewes and Hastings were merged, and a new archdeaconry of Horsham was created.

In 1982 Manchester diocese acquired a third archdeaconry, Bolton. In 1985 Croydon archdeaconry was transferred from the Diocese of Canterbury to the Diocese of Southwark. A year later Southwark archdeaconry was split to create the Archdeaconry of Lambeth (renamed Lambeth & Greenwich in 2008). In 1989 the archdeaconry of Charing Cross was created within London diocese.

In 1993, Chelmsford diocese gained its fourth archdeaconry, of Harlow. In 1994 Lindsey was abolished and merged back into Stow (thenceforth Stow & Lindsey). In 1997 Lichfield gained a fourth archdeaconry, of Walsall, Durham gained a third (Sunderland), and St Albans gained its third (Hertford). In 1999, Portsmouth archdeaconry was renamed Portsdown and the archdeaconry of the Meon was split off from it.

In 2000, the two archdeaconries in Winchester diocese were renamed. Basingstoke became Winchester, while Winchester (confusingly) became Bournemouth. In 2005 Wisbech archdeaconry was suppressed and Huntingdon renamed Huntingdon & Wisbech. Ipswich was also suppressed and divided.

- Bath and Wells: Bath, Taunton, Wells
- Birmingham: Aston, Birmingham
- Blackburn: Blackburn, Lancaster
- Bradford: Bradford, Craven
- Bristol: Bristol, Malmesbury
- Carlisle: Carlisle, West Cumberland, Westmorland & Furness
- Canterbury: Canterbury, Maidstone
- Chelmsford: Colchester, Harlow, Southend, West Ham
- Chester: Chester, Macclesfield
- Chichester: Chichester, Horsham, Lewes & Hastings
- Coventry: Coventry, Warwick
- Derby: Chesterfield, Derby
- Durham: Auckland, Durham, Sunderland
- Ely: Cambridge, Huntingdon & Wisbech
- Exeter: Barnstaple, Exeter, Plymouth, Totnes
- Gloucester: Cheltenham, Gloucester
- Guildford: Dorking, Surrey
- Hereford: Hereford, Ludlow
- Leicester: Leicester, Loughborough
- Lichfield: Lichfield, Salop, Stoke-on-Trent, Walsall
- Lincoln: Lincoln, Stow & Lindsey
- Liverpool: Liverpool, Warrington
- London: Charing Cross, Hackney, Hampstead, London, Middlesex, Northolt
- Manchester: Bolton, Manchester, Rochdale
- Newcastle: Lindisfarne, Northumberland
- Norwich: Lynn, Norfolk, Norwich
- Oxford: Berkshire, Buckingham, Oxford
- Peterborough: Northampton, Oakham
- Portsmouth: Isle of Wight, Meon, Portsdown
- Ripon & Leeds: Leeds, Richmond
- Rochester: Bromley & Bexley, Rochester, Tonbridge
- St Albans: Bedford, Hertford, St Albans
- St Edmundsbury & Ipswich: Sudbury, Suffolk
- Salisbury: Dorset, Sarum, Sherborne, Wiltshire
- Sheffield: Doncaster, Sheffield & Rotherham
- Southwark: Croydon, Lambeth & Greenwich, Lewisham, Reigate, Southwark, Wandsworth
- Southwell & Nottingham: Newark, Nottingham
- Truro: Bodmin, Cornwall
- Wakefield: Halifax, Pontefract
- Winchester: Bournemouth, Winchester
- Worcester: Dudley, Worcester
- York: Cleveland, East Riding, York

=== 2010s on ===
By the 2010s there was a general feeling that despite the decline in membership and clergy across the church, more archdeacons were needed to ensure good governance and supervision of the clergy. In 2009 Salford archdeaconry was created in Manchester diocese. In 2011 Ashford archdeaconry was created as a third in the Diocese of Canterbury. In 2013 the number of archdeaconries in Chelmsford diocese increased to seven with the creation of Barking (from West Ham), Stansted (from Colchester) and Chelmsford (from Southend) archdeaconries, and Lincoln went back to three archdeaconries with the creation of Boston. In 2014 Lewes and Hastings archdeaconry was split back into its constituent parts, Lewes being renamed Brighton & Lewes. Oxford archdeaconry was also split to create the Archdeaconry of Dorchester. In 2014 the Dioceses of Ripon & Leeds, Bradford, and Wakefield were merged to form the Diocese of Leeds; at the same time, Craven archdeaconry was dissolved and merged into Richmond, which became Richmond & Craven. From 2014-17 York diocese had an Archdeacon of Generous Giving & Stewardship. In 2015 Liverpool diocese reorganised: Warrington was renamed St Helens & Warrington, and Wigan & West Lancashire and Knowsley & Sefton were created. In 2019, St Edmundsbury diocese created two new archdeaconries: a reconstituted Ipswich, and a non-territorial Archdeacon of Rural Mission.

By the 2020s, some dioceses were reducing the number of their archdeaconries, while others were still creating new ones. Salford was merged into Bolton (henceforth Bolton & Salford) in 2019. In 2022 in the Diocese of Derby, Derby archdeaconry became Derby City & South Derbyshire, Chesterfield became East Derbyshire, and a new archdeaconry of Derbyshire Peak & Dales was created. Harlow was abolished in 2024 and its territory split between Stansted and Chelmsford. Wigan & West Lancashire was also dissolved and its territory split.

- Bath and Wells: Bath, Taunton, Wells
- Birmingham: Aston, Birmingham
- Blackburn: Blackburn, Lancaster
- Bristol: Bristol, Malmesbury
- Carlisle: Carlisle, West Cumberland, Westmorland & Furness
- Canterbury: Ashford, Canterbury, Maidstone
- Chelmsford: Barking, Chelmsford, Colchester, Southend, Stansted, West Ham
- Chester: Chester, Macclesfield
- Chichester: Brighton & Lewes, Chichester, Hastings, Horsham
- Coventry: Coventry, Warwick
- Derby: Derby City & South Derbyshire, Derbyshire Peak & Dales, East Derbyshire
- Durham: Auckland, Durham, Sunderland
- Ely: Cambridge, Huntingdon & Wisbech
- Exeter: Barnstaple, Exeter, Plymouth, Totnes
- Gloucester: Cheltenham, Gloucester
- Guildford: Dorking, Surrey
- Hereford: Hereford, Ludlow
- Leeds: Bradford, Halifax, Leeds, Pontefract, Richmond & Craven
- Leicester: Leicester, Loughborough
- Lichfield: Lichfield, Salop, Stoke-on-Trent, Walsall
- Lincoln: Boston, Lincoln, Stow & Lindsey
- Liverpool: Knowsley & Sefton, Liverpool, St Helens & Warrington
- London: Charing Cross, Hackney, Hampstead, London, Middlesex, Northolt
- Manchester: Bolton & Salford, Manchester, Rochdale
- Newcastle: Lindisfarne, Northumberland
- Norwich: Lynn, Norfolk, Norwich
- Oxford: Berkshire, Buckingham, Dorchester, Oxford
- Peterborough: Northampton, Oakham
- Portsmouth: Isle of Wight, Meon, Portsdown
- Rochester: Bromley & Bexley, Rochester, Tonbridge
- St Albans: Bedford, Hertford, St Albans
- St Edmundsbury & Ipswich: Ipswich, Rural Mission, Sudbury, Suffolk
- Salisbury: Dorset, Sarum, Sherborne, Wiltshire
- Sheffield: Doncaster, Sheffield & Rotherham
- Southwark: Croydon, Lambeth & Greenwich, Lewisham, Reigate, Southwark, Wandsworth
- Southwell & Nottingham: Newark, Nottingham
- Truro: Bodmin, Cornwall
- Winchester: Bournemouth, Winchester
- Worcester: Dudley, Worcester
- York: Cleveland, East Riding, York

== Archdeacons ==
Diocese	Archdeacon	Person	Date of birth & age	Collated (Note: The date the person first became (was collated) an archdeacon.)
Canterbury	The Archdeacon of Canterbury (Note: Also a canon residentiary of (one of) their diocese's cathedral(s).)	Will Adam	28 October 1969 (age 56)	18 July 2022
Eds & Ips	The Archdeacon of Sudbury	David Jenkins	19 October 1961 (age 64)	February 2010
Chester	The Archdeacon of Chester	Michael Gilbertson	18 August 1961 (age 64)	September 2010
London	The Archdeacon of London	Luke Miller	27 June 1966 (age 60)	24 January 2011 (Hampstead); 1 January 2016 (London)
Blackburn	The Archdeacon of Lancaster	David Picken	5 June 1963 (age 63)	19 February 2012 (Newark); 4 February 2020 (Lancaster)
Norwich	The Archdeacon of Norfolk	Steven Betts	22 November 1964 (age 61)	29 April 2012
Southwark	The Archdeacon of Lambeth	Simon Gates	12 July 1960 (age 66)	29 September 2013
Worcester	The Archdeaconry of Dudley	Nikki Groarke	2 June 1962 (age 64)	19 January 2014
Peterborough	The Archdeacon of Northampton	Richard Ormston	17 November 1961 (age 64)	1 February 2014
Oxford	The Archdeacon of Oxford	Jonathan Chaffey	1962 (age 63–64)	July 2014 (RAF); 1 May 2020 (Oxford)
Ely	The Archdeacon of Cambridge	Alex Hughes	3 October 1975 (age 50)	14 September 2014
York	The Archdeacon of the East Riding	Andy Broom	1965 (age 60–61)	6 October 2014
Lichfield	The Archdeacon of Lichfield	Sue Weller	20 August 1965 (age 60)	11 January 2015 (Walsall); 13 September 2019 (Lichfield)
Chichester	The Archdeacon of Brighton & Lewes	Martin Lloyd-Williams	12 May 1965 (age 61)	12 January 2015
Exeter	The Archdeacon of Totnes	Douglas Dettmer	5 March 1964 (age 62)	24 March 2015
London	The Archdeacon of Hampstead	John Hawkins	6 June 1963 (age 63)	7 October 2015
Liverpool	The Archdeacon of Knowsley and Sefton	Pete Spiers	31 August 1961 (age 64)	14 November 2015
Leeds	The Archdeacon of Bradford	Andy Jolley	21 March 1961 (age 65)	17 January 2016
Winchester	The Archdeacon of Winchester	Richard Brand	20 February 1965 (age 61)	21 February 2016 (Note: Brand was also Archdeacon of Bournemouth from c. 2021 until before Burgess' collation in 2023.)
Lincoln	The Archdeacon of Lincoln	Gavin Kirk	8 December 1961 (age 64)	27 March 2016
Oxford	The Archdeacon of Buckingham	Guy Elsmore	1966 (age 59–60)	18 July 2016
St Albans	The Archdeacon of Hertford	Janet Mackenzie	1962 (age 63–64)	6 September 2016
Bath & Wells	The Archdeacon of Taunton	Simon Hill	1964 (age 61–62)	1 October 2016
Carlisle	The Archdeacon of Westmorland and Furness	Vernon Ross	13 April 1957 (age 69)	25 February 2017
Leeds	The Archdeacon of Leeds	Paul Ayers	1961 (age 64–65)	28 February 2017
Manchester	The Archdeacon of Manchester	Karen Lund	1962 (age 63–64)	14 May 2017
Bath & Wells	The Archdeacon of Wells	Anne Gell	1963 (age 62–63)	20 May 2017
Leicester	The Archdeacon of Loughborough	Claire Wood	1963 (age 62–63)	8 October 2017
Canterbury	The Archdeacon of Ashford	Darren Miller	27 October 1967 (age 58)	13 January 2018
Durham	The Archdeacon of Auckland	Rick Simpson	5 July 1966 (age 60)	18 February 2018
Winchester	The Archdeacon of Bournemouth	Jean Burgess	10 June 1962 (age 64)	25 March 2018 (Bolton); 1 July 2020 (Salford); 25 June 2023 (Bournemouth)
Hereford	The Archdeacon of Hereford	Derek Chedzey	1967 (age 58–59)	9 September 2018
Prisons	Archdeacon of Prisons, The Chaplain-General	James Ridge	1977 (age 48–49)	October 2018
Salisbury	The Archdeacon of Sherborne	Penny Sayer	1959 (age 66–67)	25 November 2018
Gloucester	The Archdeacon of Gloucester (Note: Dawson has announced her intention to retire effective 19 December 2025.)	Hilary Dawson	1964 (age 61–62)	27 January 2019
Eds & Ips	The Archdeacon for Rural Mission	Sally Gaze	1969 (age 56–57)	10 February 2019
St Albans	The Archdeacon of Bedford	Dave Middlebrook	1961 (age 64–65)	30 March 2019
Bristol	The Archdeacon of Malmesbury	Christopher Bryan	1975 (age 50–51)	7 May 2019
Birmingham	The Archdeacon of Birmingham	Jenny Tomlinson	1961 (age 64–65)	12 May 2019
Chelmsford	The Archdeacon of Barking	Chris Burke	1965 (age 60–61)	12 May 2019
Chelmsford	The Archdeacon of Colchester	Ruth Patten	1972 (age 53–54)	12 May 2019
Southwell & Nottingham	The Archdeacon of Nottingham	Phil Williams	1964 (age 61–62)	3 July 2019
Exeter	The Archdeacon of Exeter	Andrew Beane	1972 (age 53–54)	25 September 2019
Coventry	Archdeacon Missioner (The Archdeacon of Warwick)	Barry Dugmore	1964 (age 61–62)	6 October 2019
Europe	The Archdeacon of the East and of Germany and Northern Europe	Leslie Nathaniel	1967 (age 58–59)	17 October 2019
Guildford	The Archdeacon of Dorking	Martin Breadmore	1967 (age 58–59)	24 November 2019
Europe	The Archdeacon of Gibraltar and of Italy and Malta	David Waller	1958 (age 67–68)	14 January 2020
Liverpool	The Archdeacon of St Helens and Warrington	Simon Fisher	1980 (age 45–46)	25 January 2020
Oxford	The Archdeacon of Berkshire	Stephen Pullin	1966 (age 59–60)	29 February 2020
London	The Archdeacon of Middlesex	Richard Frank	1970 (age 55–56)	23 March 2020
York	The Archdeacon of Cleveland	Amanda Bloor	1962 (age 63–64)	15 June 2020
Sheffield	The Archdeacon of Doncaster	Javaid Iqbal	1971 (age 54–55)	23 September 2020
Durham	The Archdeacon of Durham	Libby Wilkinson	1965 (age 60–61)	later summer 2020
London	The Archdeacon of Northolt	Catherine Pickford	1976 (age 49–50)	1 September 2020
Newcastle	The Archdeacon of Lindisfarne	Catherine Sourbut Groves	1967 (age 58–59)	14 November 2020
Hereford	The Archdeacon of Ludlow, Bishop-designate of Taunton (Note: Gibson is to become Bishop of Taunton, at which point she will vacate her Archdeaconry.)	Fiona Gibson	1970 (age 55–56)	26 April 2021
Royal Peculiar	The Archdeacon of Westminster, Canon Steward and Speaker's Chaplain	Tricia Hillas	1966 (age 59–60)	bef. 31 May 2021
Truro	The Archdeacon of Bodmin, Bishop suffragan designate of Basingstoke (Note: Betteridge has been announced as the next Bishop of Basingstoke; her consecration is scheduled for 15 October 2025 (at which point she will cease to be Archdeacon of Bodmin).)	Kelly Betteridge	1969 (age 56–57)	23 May 2021
Southwell & Nottingham	The Archdeacon of Newark	Tors Ramsey	1971 (age 54–55)	8 June 2021
Europe	The Archdeacon of North West Europe, Chaplain of Groningen	Sam Van Leer	1967 (age 58–59)	12 June 2021 (Acting since October 2020)
Armed Forces	Archdeacon for the Royal Navy, The Chaplain of the Fleet	Andrew Hillier	1968 (age 57–58)	21 June 2021
Chichester	The Archdeacon of Horsham, Rector of Nuthurst	Angela Martin	1966 (age 59–60)	4 July 2021 (Acting since 1 March)
Newcastle	The Archdeacon of Northumberland	Rachel Wood	1971 (age 54–55)	5 September 2021 (Acting since 5 January 2021)
Exeter	The Archdeacon of Barnstaple	Verena Breed	1969 (age 56–57)	15 September 2021
Lichfield	The Archdeacon of Stoke	Megan Smith	withheld	3 October 2021
Europe	The Archdeacon of France and of Switzerland	Peter Hooper	1962 (age 63–64)	21 November 2021 (France); Acting from 15 February 2021 c. 2022 (Switzerland)
Carlisle	The Archdeacon of West Cumberland	Stewart Fyfe	1969 (age 56–57)	24 January 2022
Peterborough	The Archdeacon of Oakham	Alison Booker	1974 (age 51–52)	6 February 2022
Leeds	The Archdeacon of Halifax	Bill Braviner	1966 (age 59–60)	27 February 2022
London	The Archdeacon of Hackney	Peter Farley-Moore	1972 (age 53–54)	10 April 2022
Armed Forces	Archdeacon for the Army	Stephen Dunwoody	1962 (age 63–64)	2022
Southwark	The Archdeacon of Southwark	Jonathan Sedgwick	1963 (age 62–63)	15 May 2022
Derby	The Archdeacon of Derby City and South Derbyshire	Matthew Trick	withheld	12 June 2022
Sodor & Man	The Archdeacon of Man, Priest-in-Charge of St George's and All Saints' Douglas	Irene Cowell	1974 (age 51–52)	19 June 2022
Chelmsford	The Archdeacon of West Ham	Mike Power	1961 (age 64–65)	26 June 2022 (Southend); 5 October 2024 (West Ham)
Armed Forces	Archdeacon for the Royal Air Force, The Chaplain-in-Chief	Giles Legood	1967 (age 58–59)	mid-2022
Lincoln	The Archdeacon of Stow and Lindsey	Aly Buxton	withheld	18 July 2022
Ely	The Archdeacon of Huntingdon and Wisbech	Richard Harlow	1963 (age 62–63)	25 September 2022
Norwich	The Archdeacon of Norwich	Keith James	1969 (age 56–57)	1 October 2022
Norwich	The Archdeacon of Lynn	Catherine Dobson	1971 (age 54–55)	1 October 2022
Southwark	The Archdeacon of Croydon	Greg Prior	1968 (age 57–58)	4 December 2022
Portsmouth	The Archdeacon of the Isle of Wight, Vicar of Bembridge	Steve Daughtery	1961 (age 64–65)	22 January 2023
Oxford	The Archdeacon of Dorchester	David Tyler	1969 (age 56–57)	18 March 2023
Rochester	The Archdeacon of Bromley and Bexley	Allie Kerr	1976 (age 49–50)	23 April 2023
Eds & Ips	The Archdeacon of Suffolk	Rich Henderson	1969 (age 56–57)	14 May 2023
St Albans	The Archdeacon of St Albans	Charles Hudson	1973 (age 52–53)	20 May 2023
Exeter	The Archdeacon of Plymouth	Jane Bakker	1968 (age 57–58)	13 June 2023
Portsmouth	The Archdeacon of the Meon	Kathryn Percival	1974 (age 51–52)	2 July 2023
Manchester	The Archdeacon of Bolton and of Salford	Rachel Mann	1970 (age 55–56)	4 July 2023
Liverpool	The Archdeacon of Liverpool	Miranda Threlfall-Holmes	1973 (age 52–53)	9 September 2023
Derby	The Archdeacon of Derbyshire Peak and Dales	Nicky Fenton	1970 (age 55–56)	30 September 2023
Chelmsford	The Archdeacon of Stansted	Kate Peacock	1978 (age 47–48)	4 November 2023
Chelmsford	The Archdeacon of Chelmsford	Jonathan Croucher	1968 (age 57–58)	4 November 2023
Worcester	The Archdeacon of Worcester	Mark Badger	30 October 1965 (age 60)	2 December 2023
Guildford	The Archdeacon of Surrey	Catharine Mabuza	1975 (age 50–51)	17 March 2024
London	The Archdeacon of Charing Cross	Katherine Hedderly	1963 (age 62–63)	15 April 2024
Chester	The Archdeacon of Macclesfield	Jane Proudfoot	1972 (age 53–54)	28 April 2024
Leeds	The Archdeacon of Pontefract	Cat Thatcher	1972 (age 53–54)	5 May 2024
Truro	The Archdeacon of Cornwall	Clive Hogger	1970 (age 55–56)	2 June 2024
Birmingham	The Archdeacon of Aston	Phelim O'Hare	1971 (age 54–55)	14 July 2024
Bristol	The Archdeacon of Bristol	Becky Waring	1969 (age 56–57)	1 September 2024
Bath & Wells	The Archdeacon of Bath	Charlie Peer	1969 (age 56–57)	1 September 2024
Carlisle	The Archdeacon of Carlisle	Ruth Newton	1971 (age 54–55)	8 September 2024
Manchester	The Archdeacon of Rochdale	Karen Smeeton	1975 (age 50–51)	15 September 2024
Southwark	The Archdeacon of Lewisham & Greenwich	Chigor Chike	1966 (age 59–60)	29 September 2024
Chelmsford	The Archdeacon of Southend	Sue Lucas	1961 (age 64–65)	16 February 2025
Rochester	The Archdeacon of Rochester	Sandra McCalla	withheld	23 February 2025
Rochester	The Archdeacon of Tonbridge	Nick Cornell	1978 (age 47–48)	23 February 2025
Gloucester	The Archdeacon of Cheltenham	Katrina Scott	1976 (age 48-49)	30 March 2025
Leeds	The Archdeacon of Richmond and Craven	James Theodosius	1973 (age 52–53)	6 April 2025
Lichfield	The Archdeacon of Walsall	Liz Jackson	1967 (age 58–59)	4 May 2025
Lichfield	The Archdeacon of Salop	Nick Watson	1967 (age 58–59)	4 May 2025
Salisbury	The Archdeacon of Wilts	Louise Ellis	1979 (age 46–47)	24 May 2025
Eds & Ips	The Archdeacon of Ipswich	Sam Brazier-Gibbs	1978 (age 47–48)	24 June 2025
Southwark	The Archdeacon of Wandsworth	Bridget Shepherd	1976 (age 49–50)	6 July 2025
Portsmouth	The Archdeacon of Portsdown & Vicar of St Mary's Church, Portsea	Bob White	1961 (age 64–65)	7 September 2025
Chichester	The Archdeacon of Chichester	Tom Carpenter	1988 (age 37–38)	28 September 2025
Durham	The Archdeacon of Sunderland	Katherine Bagnall	1967 (age 58–59)	30 September 2025
Leicester	The Archdeacon of Leicester	Richard Trethewey	1974 (age 51–52)	2 October 2025
Sheffield	Archdeacon-designate of Sheffield and Rotherham	David Gerrard	1982 (age 43–44)	"November" (announced)
Blackburn	Archdeacon-designate of Blackburn	Jane Atkinson	1966 (age 59–60)	23 November 2025 (announced)
Chichester	Archdeacon-designate of Hastings	Russell Dewhurst	1977 (age 48–49)	TBA
Southwark	Archdeacon-designate of Reigate	Geoff Dumbreck	1984 (age 41–42)	January 2026 (announced)
Coventry	Archdeacon Pastor (The Archdeacon of Coventry)	Vacant since January 2023		
Canterbury	The Archdeacon of Maidstone	Vacant since 18 January 2025		
York	The Archdeacon of York	Vacant since 31 March 2025		
Salisbury	The Archdeacon of Dorset	Vacant since June 2025		
Salisbury	The Archdeacon of Sarum	Vacant since July 2025		
Lincoln	The Archdeacon of Boston	Vacant since 11 August 2025		
Derby	The Archdeacon of East Derbyshire	Vacant since September 2025		

== See also ==
- List of bishops in the Church of England
- List of deans in the Church of England
- List of Church of England dioceses
- List of archdeacons in the Church in Wales
