= Robert Darwin (disambiguation) =

Robert Darwin (1766–1848) was a British physician and father of Charles Darwin.

Robert Darwin may also refer to:

- Robert Darwin of Elston (1682–1754), English lawyer, scientist and physician
- Robert Waring Darwin of Elston (1724–1816), English botanist
- Robin Darwin (Robert Vere Darwin, 1910–1974), British artist, great-grandson of Charles Darwin
