= Edward Henry Price =

English cleric and educator (1822-1898)

Edward Henry Price (1822–1898) was an English cleric and educator. He founded two successful schools, Mostyn House School which existed until 2010, and The Philberds which was taken over to house prisoners of war during World War I, and demolished after the end of the war.

== Background and early life ==
He was the son of Matthew Guérin Price (c.1788–1847, spelling variants of the name are found), for a period around 1820 a merchant in Naples. His father was from a Guernsey family, the son of Frederick Price and his wife Margaret Parker. He had at least two children out of wedlock with Carolina Maenza: Matthew (Matteo) born 1818, and Mary Caroline (Maria Carolina) born 1819. In 1824 Price through an intermediary was enquiring about Matthew's admission to the Institute at Yverdon run by Johann Heinrich Pestalozzi. In 1840 in Madras M. Price of the 34th Light Infantry, eldest son of M. G. Price of Brighton, married Elizabeth Donaldson Traveller, daughter of the Rev. C. Traveller. In 1844, Mary Caroline Price, born in Naples, eldest daughter of M. G. Price of Brighton, married William Bonsey at St Nicholas Church, Brighton; and was mother of Archdeacon William Bonsey.

Price was educated at Rugby School under Thomas Arnold, arriving in May 1835 aged 13; at this point his father was recorded in the school register as M. Price of Great Coram Street, London. Bonamy Price, a teacher there from 1830, was his first cousin, son of Frederick Price who was a brother of Matthew Guérin Price. Edward Price was a contemporary at Rugby of Thomas Hughes, and in later life subscribed to the educational principles of Thomas Arnold. He went up the school forms in step with Hughes, and an obituarist believed that Price took part in the cricket match against an MCC team described fictionally in Hughes's Tom Brown's Schooldays.

In 1841 Price matriculated at St John's College, Cambridge, graduating B.A. in 1845, M.A. in 1863; his father appears in Venn's Alumni Cantabrigienses as M. G. P. of Brighton.

== Lutterworth ==
Ordained deacon in 1845 and priest in 1846, Price spent the years 1845 to 1853 at Lutterworth as a curate, where Robert Henry Johnson was the rector. Johnson married him on 11 April 1850 to Anne (Annie), fourth daughter of Frederick Price (the younger) of Guernsey, and sister of Bonamy Price (a cousin marriage).

Mary Louisa Raffaella, youngest daughter of Matthew Guerrin Price (ODNB spelling) of Guernsey married the Rev. Milward Rodon Burge, son of William Burge, and was mother of Hubert Burge. The Coventry Standard reported that the wedding took place in Lutterworth, on Christmas Eve 1850, and was carried out by the Rev. E. H. Price, brother of the bride, the father's name being given as the late Matthew Guerin Price, Esq., of Guernsey. In 1851 Price was appointed a surrogate.

== Educator ==
=== Park Gate School (later Mostyn House School) ===
Price founded a school at Tarvin in Cheshire, for boys aged 7 to 12. Financial troubles of others forced him to leave it. It had been associated in 1854 as a preparatory school for younger boys with the Collegiate Institution, a boarding school set up in 1853 at Abbots Grange, Chester by John Brindley, which itself closed in 1857. In 1856 the school-house at Tarvin, purpose-built by Brindley, was up for sale.

In 1855 Price moved to Parkgate, on The Wirral and Cheshire coast, founding Mostyn House School in the former Mostyn House Hotel. There he took boys in the age range 8 to 18.

In 1862 Price sold the school to Algernon Sydney Grenfell. Grenfell's father the Rev. Algernon Grenfell, a colleague of Bonamy Price at Rugby School, married his sister Maria Guerin Price. His wife Annie being Maria's sister, the younger Grenfell was Price's nephew, with teaching experience after Oxford at Bromsgrove School and Repton School. He was the father of Wilfred Grenfell of Labrador.

=== The Philberds ===
Price was headmaster of The Philberds from 1862 until 1879. The initial school fee was 80 guineas per annum. He succeeded in building the reputation of Philberds as a preparatory school.

== Later life ==
Price then took the living of Kimbolton, in the gift of William Montagu, 7th Duke of Manchester, where he remained for five years. He retired to Eastbourne; but around 1888 moved to the living of Willey, Warwickshire, where he spent the rest of his life.

== Family ==
Price and his wife had 13 children. Of the daughters:

- Florence Caroline, married in 1878 the Rev. William Henry Gwillim (1852–1880), on the staff at The Philberds in 1880.
- Amy, married in 1893 John Challen.
- Mabel, married Henry Arthur Hallett MD, son of John Douglas Hallett CB of the Bombay Army.

Price's will gave a legacy to Florence, with the residual estate to be divided between the other children, apart from Frederick William Stephen and Edward Mat(t)hew. These last two sons took over The Philberds when their father left, in a partnership that was dissolved in 1885. There ensued a hiatus of family control of the school. Then John Challen and another son, Herbert Johnson, took it over for a period from 1907. Frederick Price became head of a preparatory school at Ovington, Hampshire.

- Reginald Thomson Price, youngest son, died 1884 at age 19 in Clarksville, Texas.
