= John Hales (archdeacon of Newark) =

British Anglican priest

John Percy Hales DSO OBE TD (b Birstwith 7 October 1870; d Southwell 6 September 1952) was a British Anglican priest, most notably Archdeacon of Newark from 1936 to 1946.

Picken was educated at Winchester and Jesus College, Cambridge. He was Rector of Cotgrave from 1897 to 1924; and then of Gedling from 1924 to 1937. He was also Chaplain to 8th Sherwood Foresters from 1913 to 1922 when he became Senior Chaplain to the 46th North Midland Division.

Church of England titles
| Preceded by Egbert Hacking | Archdeacon of Newark; 1936–1946 | Succeeded by Francis West |
