= Phipps Hornby (priest) =

Phipps John Hornby (10 January 1853 – 4 April 1936) was Archdeacon of Lancaster from 1909 to his death.

He was educated at Rugby and Balliol College, Oxford and ordained in 1877. After a curacy in Lytham St Annes he was Vicar of St Michael's on Wyre from 1885 to 1919.; before his Archdeacon’s appointment.

Church of England titles
Preceded by William Bonsey	Archdeacon of Lancaster; 1909–1936	Succeeded by Henry Leonard Fosbrooke
