= Brookfield Community School, Chesterfield =

Brookfield Community School

Location
- Chatsworth Road; Chesterfield, Derbyshire, S40 3NS; England; 53.23188°N 1.47052°W

Information
- Type: Academy
- Established: 1990
- Local authority: Derbyshire
- Department for Education URN: 136548 Tables
- Ofsted: Reports
- Chair of Governors: Professor Tom Denton
- Headteacher: K. Hirst
- Staff: 7 senior leadership, 77 teaching, 74 support
- Gender: Coeducational
- Age: 11 to 18
- Enrolment: 1084
- Website: brookfield.derbyshire.sch.uk

Brookfield Community School is an academy school located on Chatsworth Road (A619) in the west of Chesterfield, Derbyshire, England. It is a comprehensive secondary school which has around 1300 students between the ages 11–18 (Years 7–13), including approximately 300 sixth formers.

== Academic performance ==
In the data for the year 2024/2025, the school had a Progress 8 score of 0.5, indicating that pupils at the end of Key Stage 4 had made more progress, on average, than pupils across England who got similar results at the end of Key Stage 2. The same data shows 66.2% of pupils achieving a GCSE grade 5 or above in English & Maths.

== History ==
Brookfield Community School's history stretches back to the founding of the Chesterfield Grammar School in 1598. This school taught boys throughout the 17th and 18th century, until its closure in 1832. In 1845, the school was restarted in a new building (which remains on Sheffield Road today, and is now part of Chesterfield College), expanding to a size of around 500 in 1928. Additional land on Storrs Road (on the west side of the town) was acquired in the 1930s, but minimally used due to lack of funds and the Second World War. In 1949, work began on the levelling of playing fields on the site, which was opened in 1953.

The present site of Brookfield (on Chatsworth Road/Brookside, adjacent to the Storrs Road playing fields) was opened for Chesterfield School in 1967. Following the Education Act 1944, the school became a state-sponsored grammar school.

Brookfield Community School was formed in 1991 in a re-organisation of schools in Chesterfield, On 1 April 2011, Brookfield Community School officially gained academy status.

In 2018, following an Inadequate OFSTED inspection, the school was encouraged to join a MAT (Multi Academy Trust). Shortly afterwards they announced they were joining Redhill Academy Trust. The school's most recent Ofsted inspection judged it to be 'Good'.

== Staff incidents ==
In April 2018, a TRA disciplinary panel found that Mark Rodda had engaged in unacceptable conduct while working as a science teacher at the school between January and May 2017. His behaviour included inappropriate physical contact, such as massaging pupils' shoulders and placing his arm around them. He also made explicit sexual remarks to students. Rodda was indefinitely banned from teaching in any school or sixth form college in England.

== Notable former pupils ==
- Ian Blackwell, cricketer

=== Chesterfield Grammar School ===
- Chris Adams, former Derbyshire and England cricketer.
- Sir Alfred Arnold, Conservative MP from 1895 to 1900 for Halifax
- Tom Bailey of the Thompson Twins
- Charles Balguy, physician
- B. V. Bowden, Baron Bowden, Principal of UMIST 1953–76
- Henry Bradley, lexicographer, president from 1891 to 1893 of the Philological Society
- Francis Chavasse, Bishop of Liverpool from 1900 to 1923
- Erasmus Darwin, grandfather of Charles Darwin
- Robert Waring Darwin of Elston, botanist
- Sir John Fretwell, UK Ambassador to France from 1982 to 1987
- Ken Gibbons, Archdeacon of Lancaster from 1981 to 1997
- Richard Gillingwater CBE, dean from 2007 to 2012 of the Cass Business School, chief executive from 2003 to 2006 of Credit Suisse First Boston
- Rt Rev William Godfrey (bishop), Bishop of Peru since 1998
- Ralph Heathcote, writer
- Sir William McCrea, astronomer
- Geoff Miller, England cricketer
- Charles Newcombe, cricketer
- Ian Newton, OBE FRS FRSE, former deputy chief scientific officer, Centre for Ecology and Hydrology, Monks Wood
- Josiah Pearson, Bishop of Newcastle (Australia) from 1880 to 1890
- Sir Robert Robinson FRSE, Nobel-prize winning organic chemist, and discoverer of the structure of morphine and penicillin, and invented the symbol for benzene in 1923
- Christopher Rowland, former Labour MP from 1964 to 1967 for Meriden
- Sir Robin Saxby, former Chief Executive of ARM Holdings, who made it into a global giant
- Thomas Secker, Archbishop of Canterbury from 1758 to 1768
- Captain Edwin Swale CBE DFC, WWI flying ace
- Sir Brian Unwin, president from 1993 to 1999 of the European Investment Bank, and from 2001 to 2013 of the European Centre for Nature Conservation, and chairman from 1987 to 1993 of HM Customs and Excise
- Sir David Walker (banker), chairman since 2012 of Barclays, and Morgan Stanley International from 1995 to 2001, and of the Securities and Investments Board (became the Financial Services Authority) from 1988 to 1992
- Air Marshal Philip Wigglesworth
- Bob Wilson, goalkeeper and former BBC presenter of Football Focus
- Charles Wood, scriptwriter, who co-wrote The Charge of the Light Brigade (1968) and Tumbledown (1988)

== Notable former teachers ==
- Cyril Bibby, biologist; taught biology (1938–40)
- Paul Holmes, History master (1979–83), Liberal Democrat MP for Chesterfield (2001–10)
- Cec Thompson, former professional rugby league footballer; Head of Economics and Rugby Master (at the school for 17 years, retired 1991)
