= Cyril Bibby =

Bibby in 1967.

Cyril Bibby (born Harold Cyril Bibby; Liverpool, 1 May 1914 – Edinburgh, 20 June 1987) was a biologist and educator. He was also one of the first sexologists.

== Early life, family, etc. ==
Bibby was the third of eight children and lived in Aigburth, Liverpool. He was educated at Sudley Road School, Liverpool, Liverpool Collegiate School and Queens' College, Cambridge (BA 1935, MA 1939). He was active in the CU Socialist Society and the Union Society.

In 1936 he married Frances (Florence Mabel) Hirst (1914–1993), who had studied at Girton College, Cambridge, from 1932 to 1935; they had two sons and two daughters. Len Carney was a brother in law.

== Career ==
- pre-war: taught science and biology at Oulton School, Liverpool and Chesterfield Grammar School, Derbyshire.
- 1941–c.1944: Education Officer at the British Social Hygiene Council
- c. 1944–1946: Education Officer at the Central Council for Health Education
- 1946–1959: Lecturer and then Senior Lecturer at Marjon, under the Principalship of the poet Michael Roberts, whom he adored.
- 1959–1977: Principal of Kingston upon Hull College of Education from 1959, becoming Pro-Director when it merged into Hull College of Higher Education (now Hull College).

He was an early member of the Council of Christians and Jews: he prided himself on being the only such member who was "neither a Christian nor a Jew" (he was an atheist).

In 1958-59 he was the prospective Labour Party candidate in Barnet opposing Reginald Maudling (but resigned on moving to Hull in September 1959, just before the election was announced).

He is known for his work on education, T.H. Huxley, and limericks. Indeed, David Rubinstein has said "If Huxley was Darwin's bulldog, then Cyril Bibby was Huxley's bulldog".

Bibby gained an MSc at the University of Liverpool in 1940 for research on Europe in Quaternary times, and a PhD at the University of London in 1955 for a thesis on T.H. Huxley. He wrote books and articles on Huxley, and on human biology, especially in the fields of health and sex education, and later on limericks.

The Bibby papers are housed at Cambridge University Library.

== Publications by Bibby ==
Books

- The First Fifty Years: A Brief History of Kingston Upon Hull Training college 1913 - 1963. Hull: The College. (1963)
- The approach to marriage, with foreword by Cyril Bibby and preface by Dr Maude Royden
- The Evolution of Man and His Culture (1938). London, V. Gollancz
- How life is passed on (1946)
- How life is handed on (1960)
- Simple Experiments in Biology (1950)
- Sex Education (1951)
- T.H. Huxley: scientist, humanist and educator (1959)
- Race, Prejudice and Education (UNESCO - 1959)
- The intelligent parents' manual (1953)
- Health education (1964)
- The Essence Of T.H. Huxley - selections From his writings (1967)
- The Human Body (Puffin Picture Book. no. 102.) by Cyril Bibby and Ian T. Morison (1969); also Your body and how it works 1969.
- Scientist Extraordinary: the life and work of Thomas Henry Huxley 1825–1895. Oxford: Pergamon (1972).
- Art of the Limerick (1978)
- Reminiscences of a happy life (1985) ( Autobiography)

Articles

- (1963). Sex in Society. The Eugenics Review 55 (2):118.
- Cyril Bibby (1960). Education in Russia. The Eugenics Review 52 (2):127.
- Cyril Bibby (1960). "Darwin's Place in History". The Eugenics Review 52 (3):169.
- Cyril Bibby (1959). Darwin and the Darwinian Revolution. The Eugenics Review 51 (3):169.
- Cyril Bibby (1946). Education for Family Life. The Eugenics Review 38 (2):87.
- Cyril Bibby (1963). The Banned Books of England and Other Countries. The Eugenics Review 54 (4):221.
- Cyril Bibby (1946). Sex Education Aims, Possibilities and Plans. The Eugenics Review 37 (4):157.
- Cyril Bibby (1956). A Victorian Experiment in International Education: The College at Spring Grove. British Journal of Educational Studies 5 (1):25 - 36.
- Cyril Bibby (1972). What Does 'Sex Education' Mean? Journal of Moral Education 1 (2):153-154.

== Interviews ==
Bibby, Cyril; Blythe, Max (1981). "Dr Cyril Bibby in interview with Dr Max Blythe". Oxford Brookes University. doi:10.24384/000030.
