= North Chadderton School =

Location
- Chadderton Hall Road; Chadderton, Greater Manchester, OL9 0BN; England; 53°33′25″N 2°09′09″W

Information
- Type: Academy
- Motto: Transforming lives through the power of education.
- Established: 2014
- Local authority: Oldham
- Department for Education URN: 141248 Tables
- Ofsted: Reports
- Headteacher: Adelle Greenwood
- Gender: Coeducational
- Age: 11 to 18
- Enrolment: 1,507 pupils
- Website: http://www.northchaddertonschool.co.uk

North Chadderton School is a mixed gender secondary school and sixth form, located in Chadderton, in the Metropolitan Borough of Oldham, Greater Manchester, England. The school is a member of The Oak Trust.

== Admissions ==
The range of academic years corresponds to ages from 11 to 18. The school is exceeding the designed capacity. It is situated on the B6195, not far from the A627(M) close to Chadderton Fold and opposite St Matthew's Church near Chadderton Hall Park.

== History ==
North Chadderton County Secondary School was a secondary modern school, which was split into girls' and boys' sections. South Chadderton County Secondary School, another secondary modern, was on Butterworth Lane in Chadderton.

=== Grammar school ===
Chadderton Grammar School on Broadway, a mixed school, was officially opened in October 1930 by David Lindsay, 27th Earl of Crawford. It was for 300 pupils from Chadderton, Failsworth, Royton, Crompton and Lees. Extensions to the school were opened in September 1935. By 1950 it had 700 boys and girls, 800 by 1954 and 900 by 1958. In 1957 it was decided to split the school into two single sex schools. In 1959, the boys left for the new grammar school, and the girls stayed at the old site. Parents protested about the move. Chadderton Grammar School for Boys was on Chadderton Hall Road, and concentrated more on science and maths. It had around 600 boys.

=== Comprehensive ===
In 1974, the school's administration moved from the Lancashire Education Committee to Oldham MBC, and secondary schools were re-organised in September 1975 and the school became a comprehensive mixed school. The lower school on Broadway of the North Chadderton secondary modern school was merged with the school.

North Chadderton underwent a transformation in 2012-13 by constructing a new school on the same site. This brought both lower school and upper school sites together.

=== Academy ===
North Chadderton School converted to academy status on 1 September 2014 and is now independent of local authority control. However the school continues to coordinate with Oldham Metropolitan Borough Council for admissions.

== Curriculum ==
Pupils follow the UK National Curriculum. Key Stage 4 (GCSE) examinations are taken during Years 9, 10 and 11.

== Sixth form ==
North Chadderton has its own sixth form 6th form with the majority of pupils former pupils at the compulsory level (years 7-11). Current attendance is around 150 pupils within both years.

== Notable alumni ==
- William Ash, actor
- Len Carney was Headmaster
- Matthew Dunster, actor, theatre director and playwright
- Karen Elson, supermodel and singer-songwriter
- Kelvin Fletcher, actor in Emmerdale
- Mike Flynn, footballer who made over 650 appearances in the Football League
- Keeley Forsyth, actress and musician.
- Matthew Gilks, footballer who played in the Premier League for Blackpool
- Iestyn Harris, rugby league player and coach who now works as a TV pundit
- Jo Hartley, actress
- Jeff Hordley, then known as Jeff Percy, actor in Emmerdale as Cain Dingle
- Tyrone Mears, former footballer for Derby County, Bolton Wanderers, Burnley and Preston North End
- Danny Philliskirk, former Oldham Athletic footballer
- Mark Robins, FA Cup and UEFA Super Cup winning footballer. Has also managed several Football League clubs
- John Stalker, Senior Police officer, author, television personality
- Nicola Stephenson, actress who has appeared in TV soaps such as Brookside and Emmerdale
- Stuart Wolfenden, actor

=== North Chadderton County Secondary School ===
- Woolly Wolstenholme, member of Barclay James Harvest rock band

=== Chadderton Grammar School for Boys ===
- Peter Ballard, Archdeacon of Lancaster from 2006–10
- Les Chapman, former footballer and manager
- Mike Freer, Conservative MP since 2010 for Finchley and Golders Green
