= Mike Everitt =

Mike or Michael Everitt may refer to:

- Michael Everitt (born 1968), British Anglican priest
- Mike Everitt (baseball) (born 1964), Major League Baseball umpire
- Mike Everitt (footballer) (born 1941), association football player and coach
