= William Bonsey (cricketer) =

English cricketer

William Henry Bonsey (July 1818 – September 1900) was an English first-class cricketer active in 1839 who played for Marylebone Cricket Club (MCC). He was born in Upton-cum-Chalvey and died in Eastbourne. He appeared in two first-class matches.

== Life ==
He was the son of William Bonsey of Slough. A memorial in Upton-cum-Chalvey church shows that his mother Mary Sophia died in 1850. His father married again, in 1852 at Holy Trinity Church, Marylebone, to Mary Eliza Mason, daughter of Robert Mason of Salt Hill. He died at his residence, Belle Vue, Slough, on 7 March 1867.

Bonsey was educated at Eton College and became a solicitor. He spent an extended period in Australia. He moved to Geelong, Victoria, Australia, where Bonsey was a police magistrate from 1853. He took part in one of the matches against the English Visiting Cricket XI, for the Geelong and Western District team, in January 1862, keeping wicket.

Having made a voyage back to the United Kingdom in 1868, Bonsey retired as police magistrate at Geelong in 1869.

== Family ==
Bonsey married in 1844 Mary Caroline Price, eldest daughter of Matthew Guerin Price of Brighton. Their son William Bonsey was born in Slough in 1845, and entered St John's College, Cambridge as a pensioner in 1864. Their third son Henry Dawes Bonsey (1849–1919) attended Geelong School in the period c.1865 to 1867. He was admitted a pensioner at St John's College in 1869, graduating B.A. in 1874. He entered the Inner Temple in 1872, and was called to the bar in 1875. He went the Midland circuit, and became a county court judge in 1911.

Edward Henry Price of The Philberds was one of the executors in 1867 of William Bonsey senior. He was brother-in-law to William Bonsey junior. Two generations later, William Henry Bonsey (born 1873) attended The Philberds.

== Bibliography ==
- Haygarth, Arthur (1996) [1862]. Scores & Biographies, Volume 1 (1744–1826). Kennington: Frederick Lillywhite. ISBN 978-19-00592-23-9.
- Haygarth, Arthur (1997) [1862]. Scores & Biographies, Volume 2 (1827–1840). Kennington: Frederick Lillywhite. ISBN 978-19-00592-23-9.
