= Ken Gibbons =

English Anglican clergyman (1931–2024)

Kenneth Harry Gibbons (24 December 1931 – 1 August 2024) was an English Anglican clergyman who was the Archdeacon of Lancaster from 1981 to 1997.

== Biography ==
Born on 24 December 1931, Gibbons was educated at Chesterfield Grammar School, the University of Manchester and Ripon College Cuddesdon. After National Service he was ordained in 1956. After a curacy in Fleetwood he was Schools Secretary of the Student Christian Movement from 1960 to 1962. He was Senior Curate of St Martin-in-the-Fields, Westminster and held incumbencies in New Addington and Portsea, Portsmouth before his Archdeacon’s appointment; and St Michael's on Wyre afterwards.

Gibbons died on 1 August 2024, at the age of 92.

Church of England titles
Preceded by Geoffrey Gower-Jones	Archdeacon of Lancaster; 1981–1997	Succeeded by Robert Sidney Ladds
