= John Stalker =

British police chief (1939–2019)

- Born: 14 April 1939; Manchester, England
- Died: 15 February 2019 (aged 79)
- Occupations: Police officer, author, television personality
- Known for: The Stalker Inquiry; Television appearances
- Spouse: Stella Bendon (m. 1961; died 2017)
- Children: 2

John Stalker (14 April 1939 – 15 February 2019) was a British police officer who served as Deputy Chief Constable of Greater Manchester Police. He headed the Stalker Inquiry that investigated the shooting of suspected members of the Provisional Irish Republican Army in 1982. He also had a television and literary career.

== Career ==
Stalker was born in the Miles Platting district of Manchester, attended Chadderton Grammar School, and joined the Manchester City Police as a cadet in 1956. He joined the CID in 1961 and was promoted to the ranks of Detective Sergeant (1964), Detective Inspector (1968) and Detective Chief Inspector (1974). At age 38 he became the youngest Detective Chief Superintendent in Britain (1978). He attended the Senior Command Course at the Police Staff College, Bramshill in 1979. He was appointed Assistant Chief Constable of the Greater Manchester Police in 1980. A graduate of the Royal College of Defence Studies, he travelled around the world studying terrorism and crime from an international perspective. During his career, he served in the Serious Crime Squad, the Bomb Squad and the Drugs Squad. He also spent a short period of time as a consultant to Millwall F.C., advising on methods to curb their well-documented problem with hooliganism.

== The Stalker Inquiry ==
Stalker headed the eponymous Stalker Inquiry, an investigation into the shootings of suspected members of the Provisional Irish Republican Army (IRA) by the Royal Ulster Constabulary in 1983. He was temporarily suspended from duty and removed from the inquiry in 1986, based on false allegations. He was the subject of a British Parliamentary debate held on 27 November 1986, where the following allegations which led to his suspension were given:

"The reasons put forward for Mr Stalker being taken off the inquiry essentially related to four matters. One was that a personal associate of his was under investigation for fraud. I must make it clear that even to this day that individual has not been charged with any criminal offence. It was suggested that Mr Stalker associated with the same individual, and possibly other known criminals and that there was photographic evidence of people in the same room. It was suggested that, while he was on holiday with Kevin Taylor, the yacht on which they were sailing was under observation by the American authorities. The implication was that they were involved in drugs or some other criminal activity... It was also suggested that Kevin Taylor, through his solicitor, had threatened that if he was charged with offences he would, I think it was said, blow Stalker and his associates out........it contains innuendo of the most unpleasant sort, which is unfitting for such a report. The report is simply not up to scratch. At one stage, it talks about an anonymous allegation that the police dropped a criminal action against a person whom Mr Stalker knew. The Sampson report says: No further action was taken…the papers have been destroyed…the matter cannot be taken further nor can any comment be made. There should be further investigation into the claim in The Observer that its inquiries showed that the case was prosecuted in the normal way."
Tony Lloyd MP

The Sampson report made the recommendation to the Greater Manchester Police Committee that Stalker should be the subject of a tribunal. However, the committee voted overwhelmingly in Stalker's favour and decided not to send the matter to tribunal, instead to reinstate Stalker to his post as Deputy Chief Constable of Greater Manchester Police. By the end of the affair, Stalker's legal costs amounted to around £22,000; the Greater Manchester Police Committee refused to contribute to Stalker's legal bills. The Stalker affair had generated a huge groundswell of public emotion and many members of the public and officers from the ranks of Greater Manchester Police force offered cash contributions to Stalker to assist in covering his legal costs. After much wrangling between the Greater Manchester Police Committee, the Home Office and the Association of Chief Police Officers a fund was established, administered by the Manchester Evening News.

== Retirement ==
After his retirement, Stalker was active in developing new careers, in both the media and industry. He was a director of a large national security company and ran his own consultancy and advisory group. He delivered seminars on motivational issues, and was active on the after dinner lecture circuit. He wrote frequently for The Daily Telegraph and The Sunday Times newspapers, among others.

== Dangerous Dogs Act 1991 ==
Following an incident in which Stalker had to fend off two rottweilers attacking his wife, Stella, in June 2006, he publicly supported an overhaul of the Dangerous Dogs Act 1991. It took at least sixty stitches to mend her wounds and the injury required treatment for many weeks.

== Television and acting career ==
For six years he was the host of the Central Television TV programme, Crime Stalker, and later hosted Inside Crime on Carlton TV. He presented the Carlton TV programme The Verdict, which ran for 26 episodes. He was also a member of a BBC Governors advisory panel.

He appeared in the following TV programmes:

- Cluedo (1990) as a contestant, facing off against Anna Carteret.
- Question Time, (7 March 1991) as a guest
- Frank Sidebottom's Fantastic Shed Show, (1992) as a guest
- Harry Enfield and Chums (episode 1.3, 1994), as the Crimesearch presenter on a sketch depicting The Scousers
- Have I Got News for You, (episode 7.5, 1994) as a guest
- Millennium: Fact & Fiction (1997)
- GMTV, 25 January 2005 (one episode, 2005) as himself
- The Tuesday Special: Cromwell Street (Central TV, 1994) presenter

== Personal life and death ==
Stalker died on 15 February 2019, aged 79. His wife, Stella, predeceased her husband by fourteen months. He was survived by his two daughters, six grandchildren and two great-grandchildren.

Stalker gave the peroration at the funeral of the footballer Len Carney who had been his headmaster at Chadderton Grammar School.

== Publications ==
- Stalker (autobiography), 1988 ISBN 978-0670822621

== See also ==
- Shoot to Kill (1990 film), a drama reconstruction of the Stalker Inquiry and the events behind it.
