= Brian Woodhams =

The Ven. Brian Watson Woodhams (16 January 1911 - 25 August 1992) was a British Anglican priest, most notably Archdeacon of Newark from 1965 to 1979.

Woodhams was educated at Dover College, Oak Hill Theological College and St John's College, Durham, where he graduated with a Bachelor of Arts in 1936. He was ordained Deacon in 1936; and Priest in 1937. He served curacies in Holloway, Bethnal Green and New Malden; and incumbencies at Poplar, Mapperley and Farndon.

Church of England titles
Preceded by Kenneth Thompson	Archdeacon of Newark; 1965 – 1979	Succeeded by David Leaning
