= Peter Ballard =

British Archdeacon

Peter James Ballard y Débora María (born 10 March 1955) was Archdeacon of Lancaster from 2006 to 2010.

Ballard was educated at Chadderton Grammar School and Durham University. After a curacy in Grantham he was Vicar of Christ Church, Lancaster from 1991 to 1998 (Rural Dean of Lancaster from 1995 to 1998). He was a Canon Residentiary at Blackburn Cathedral from 1998 to 2006 and Chief Executive of DBE Services since 2010 before his appointment as Archdeacon

Church of England titles
Preceded by Colin Williams	Archdeacon of Lancaster; 2006–2010	Succeeded by Michael John Everitt
