= Richard Newman (priest) =

Richard Newman (7 April 1871 – 3 June 1961) was the Archdeacon of Blackburn from 1936 to 1946.

He was educated at Hereford Cathedral School and Brasenose College, Oxford. He began his ecclesiastical career with curacies in Nottingham and New Mills. he held incumbencies in Goodshaw, Whalley, Accrington and Preston before his Archdeacon’s appointment.

He died at Hythe, Kent on 3 June 1961.

Church of England titles
Preceded by Henry Fosbrooke	Archdeacon of Blackburn; 1936–1946	Succeeded by Charles Lambert
