= Geoffrey Gower-Jones =

Geoffrey Gower-Jones(30 April 1910 – 5 November 1982) was Archdeacon of Lancaster from 1966 to 1980.

He was born into an ecclesiastical family educated at Brasenose College, Oxford and ordained in 1934. After curacies in Royton and Prestwich he became Vicar of Belfield in 1943; and then of St Stephen-on-the-Cliffs, Blackpool before his archdeacon’s appointment.

Church of England titles
Preceded by Charles Lambert	Archdeacon of Lancaster; 1966–1980	Succeeded by Ken Gibbons
