= David Picken =

British Anglican priest

David Anthony Picken (born 5 June 1963) is a British Anglican priest. Since 2020, he has served as the Archdeacon of Lancaster; he previously served as Archdeacon of Newark since 2012.

== Biography ==
Picken was born in Hednesford, Staffordshire on 5 June 1963. He was educated at Kingsmead School, Hednesford and the University of London. He was firstly a teacher of Religious Studies; then ordained deacon in 1990, and priest in 1991. After a curacy in Worth, West Sussex he was Team Vicar and Hospital Chaplain in Wordsley then Team Rector of High Wycombe

Church of England titles
Preceded by Nigel Peyton	Archdeacon of Newark; 2012–2020	Succeeded by Tors Ramsey
Preceded by Michael Everitt	Archdeacon of Lancaster; 2020–present	Incumbent
