= Charles Lambert (Archdeacon of Lancaster) =

Charles Henry Lambert (13 January 1894 – 12 July 1983) was an Anglican priest in the 20th century.

He was educated at Leeds University and Ripon College Cuddesdon and ordained in 1918. After curacies in Redcar and Guisborough he held incumbencies in York and Royston. He was Warden of Whalley Abbey from 1934 to 1945; Archdeacon of Blackburn from 1946 to 1959, and then of Lancaster from that year to 1966.

Church of England titles
Preceded by Richard Newman	Archdeacon of Blackburn; 1946–1959	Succeeded by Arnold Picton
Preceded by Gordon Fallows	Archdeacon of Lancaster; 1959–1966	Succeeded by Geoffrey Gower-Jones
