= Hubert Burge =

British bishop (1862–1925)

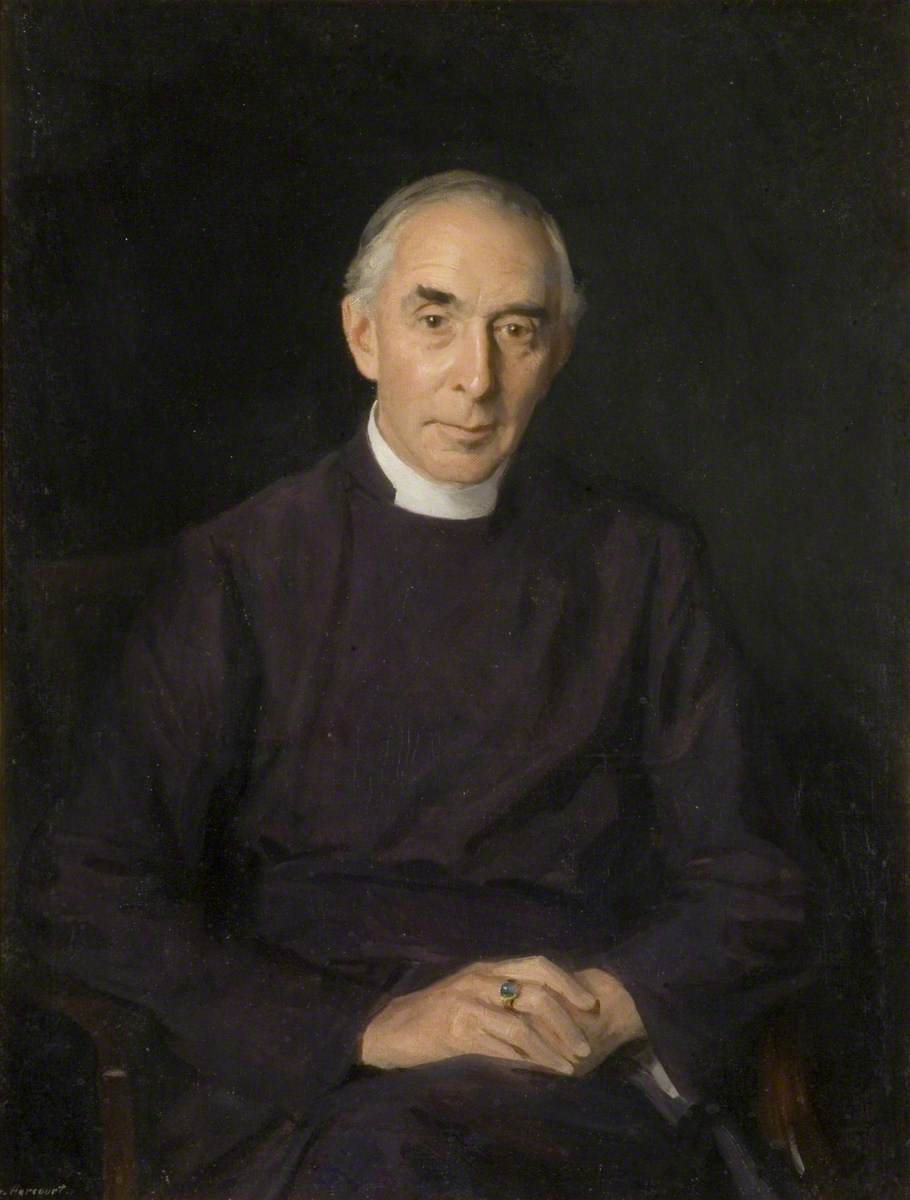
Hubert Burge by George Harcourt

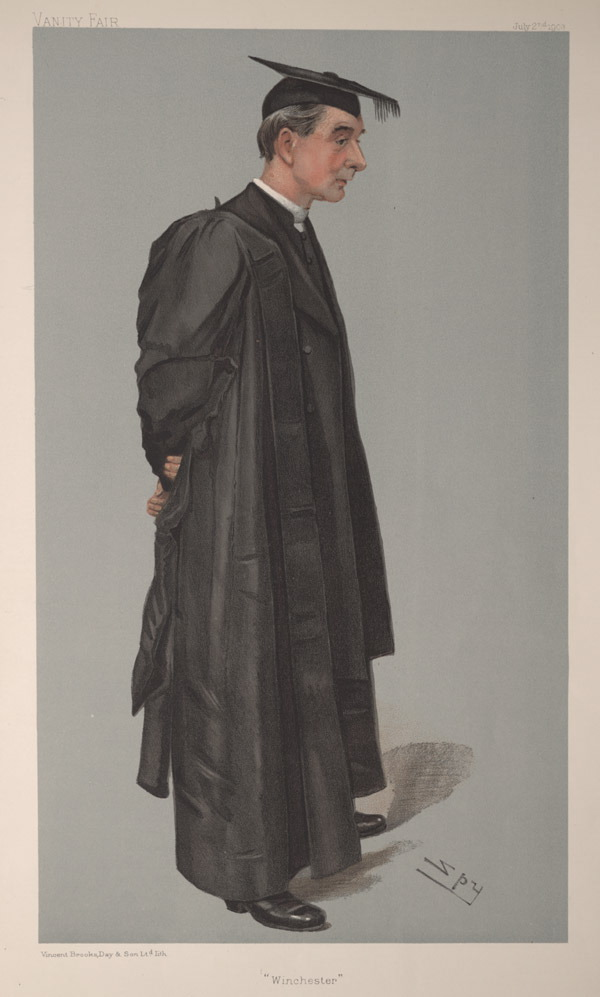
Caricature by Spy in Vanity Fair

Hubert Murray Burge KCVO (9 August 1862 – 11 June 1925) was an Anglican clergyman, headmaster of Winchester College, Bishop of Southwark, and Bishop of Oxford.

== Life ==
He was the son of the Rev. Milward Rodon Burge, son of William Burge, and his wife Mary Louisa Raffaella, daughter of Matthew Guerrin Price of Guernsey, and sister of Edward Henry Price; he was born in Meerut. He was educated at Bedford School and Marlborough College. He matriculated at University College, Oxford in 1882, graduating B.A. in 1886.

Burge's first post after graduation was as a schoolmaster at Wellington College after which he was Fellow and Dean of his old college. In March 1902 he graduated as a Bachelor of Divinity (BD) and at the same time was given a Doctorate of Divinity (DD).

Burge was Headmaster of Repton School from 1900 to 1901 and then of Winchester from 1901 to 1911, before his elevation to the episcopate as Bishop of Southwark in 1911. It was a surprise appointment because Burge had had no parochial experience and his health was fragile, and the Southwark diocese was regarded as very demanding for a diocesan Bishop.

During the First World War, Burge emphasised the importance of Christian principles underpinning British involvement. ‘The thing for which England is to stand to her children and before the bar of history is not simply political liberty and justice and constitutional government and international conscience, but the ‘Mind of Christ’ informing the life of her people, and giving political and moral ideals their true sanction. For that Force in the world, we are to stand or not stand at all’.

In 1917, he wrote ‘We shall not do much to promote the Great Cause of lofty principles and high ideals in the struggle with materialism, if in any way we encourage the belief that making shells or growing potatoes is national service while the ministrations of the Church and promoting moral welfare are not’.

Translated to Oxford in 1919,ex officio Chancellor of the Order of the Garter and appointed Clerk of the Closet, he was later also a Sub-Prelate of the Order of St John of Jerusalem and Chancellor of the Most Noble Order of the Garter.

He was a keen cricketer.

Burge was made a Knight Commander of the Royal Victorian Order in the 1925 Birthday Honours, days before he died in office on 11 June 1925.

== Family ==
Burge married in 1898 Evelyn Isabel Franck Bright, daughter of James Franck Bright. He was survived by a son and a daughter of the marriage.

== Notes ==
Church of England titles
Preceded by Edward Talbot	Bishop of Southwark; 1911–1919	Succeeded by Cyril Garbett
Preceded by Charles Gore	Bishop of Oxford; 1919–1925	Succeeded by Thomas Strong
Preceded by William Boyd Carpenter	Clerk of the Closet; 1919–1925	Succeeded by Thomas Strong
Academic offices
Preceded by William Furneaux	Headmaster of Repton School; 1900–1901	Succeeded by Lionel Ford
Preceded by William Andrewes Fearon	Headmaster of Winchester College; 1901–1911	Succeeded by Montague Rendall
