= John Challen =

Welsh sportsman (1863–1937)

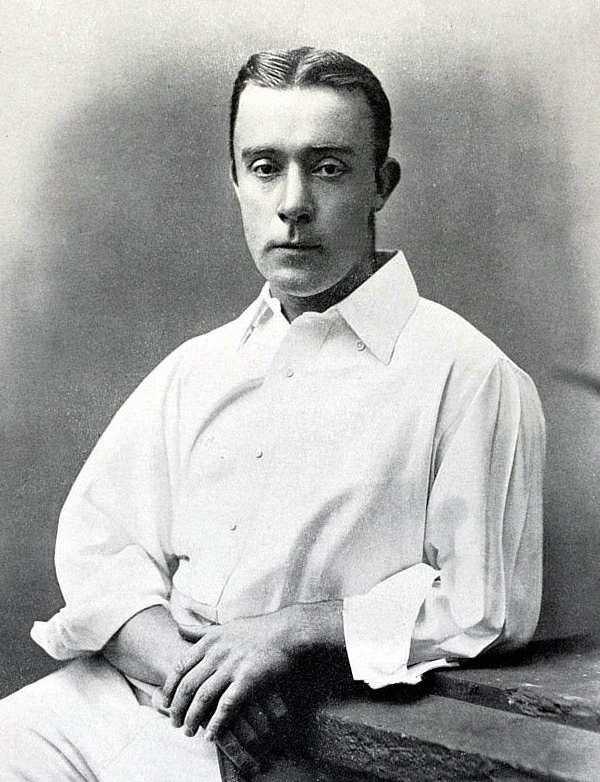

Personal information
- Full name: John Bonamy Challen
- Born: 23 March 1863; Ruthin, Denbighshire, Wales
- Died: 5 June 1937 (aged 74); Eastbourne, Sussex, England
- Height: 5 ft 6.5 in (1.69 m)
- Batting: Right-handed
- Bowling: Right-arm fast-medium

Domestic team information
- Years: Team
- 1880–99: Somerset

Career statistics
Competition	First-class
Matches	52
Runs scored	1656
Batting average	19.71
100s/50s	1/6
Top score	108
Balls bowled	1029
Wickets	16
Bowling average	35.75
5 wickets in innings	0
10 wickets in match	0
Best bowling	4/43
Catches/stumpings	32/–
- Source: CricketArchive, 12 January 2010
Association football career
- Position: Right wing
International career
Years	Team	Apps	(Gls)
1887–1890	Wales	4	(0)

John Bonamy Challen (23 March 1863 – 5 June 1937) was a Welsh amateur sportsman who played first-class cricket and association football during the late 19th century. He played football for Corinthian F.C., and was selected to play for Wales four times between 1887 and 1890. As a cricketer, he made over 50 first-class appearances, all for Somerset County Cricket Club. His availability in both sports was limited by his career in education; he was headmaster at a number of schools across southern England.

Challen was considered one of Somerset's principal amateur batsmen during the late 1880s and early 1890s, when he frequently finished near the top of their batting averages. His style was more defensive than many of his fellow amateurs, and he was often praised for playing vital innings to keep Somerset's batting together. He scored the only first-class century of his career in 1893 against Sussex, but began to appear less often after 1894, finally bowing out of county cricket after the 1899 season. In all, he scored 1,656 first-class runs at an average of 19.71.

== Early life and background ==
John Bonamy Challen was born in Ruthin, Denbighshire, Wales, on 26 March 1863. He was the son of a school master based at Ruthin Grammar School; the family home was later in Nunney, near Frome in east Somerset. He was educated at Honiton Grammar School, Philberds School and then Marlborough College. He gained a competitive scholarship to Marlborough in 1877, in which year his father John Louis Challen, who had been ordained priest in 1870 from the Salisbury Diocesan Theological College, became rector of Nunney. By 1882 his father was involved in bankruptcy proceedings. His younger brother Louis Bonamy (born 1868) went to Derby School on a choral award, and then Durham University. He also became a schoolmaster, teaching in Crediton as John had.

At Marlborough, Challen played for the school's cricket team in 1879, and played at Lord's in their annual fixture against Rugby School, in which he scored 15 and 4 runs, and took one wicket, though Marlborough lost the match by 97 runs.

== Teaching career ==
Challen left Marlborough College at the end of 1879. He went directly into teaching, at age about 17. He taught at Thornton Heath in Surrey from 1880 until 1882, and then Wellingborough Grammar School until 1892. He was then appointed as headmaster of Queen Elizabeth's Grammar School, Crediton for three years.

Later, Challen moved to the Devon County School in West Buckland for four years. He then was headmaster at Philberds School, in the Maidstone area, from 1905 to 1910; and Aldro in Eastbourne until 1918. After that he became a partner at the Christopher's school in the same town.

Challen died in a nursing home in Eastbourne on 5 June 1937, aged 74.

== Sporting career ==
=== Cricket ===
In 1875, while still a teenager, Challen was among the youngest of those to donate half a guinea to help establish Somerset County Cricket Club. Five years later, in 1880, Challen began playing for Somerset; he appeared for the county in a match against sixteen players from Ashton Court in July, and in three county matches the following month. Though he played primarily as an attacking, free-hitting batsman, and an occasional fast-medium paced bowler, he also kept wicket for Somerset against Leicestershire in 1880, taking a stumping in the first innings. His teaching career meant that his availability for Somerset was limited, and the vast majority of his appearances were made during the summer holidays, typically in August. In 1883, while teaching at Wellingborough, he played a match for Northamptonshire, but the following season he was playing for Somerset again. In June 1884, Challen scored 205 runs for Wellingborough Grammar School against an Oxford team put together by R.T. Hughes.

Challen's appearances for Somerset in 1880, and Northamptonshire in 1883, had all been in "second-class" cricket, as neither team had first-class status at the time. As such, Challen's debut in first-class cricket came in August 1884, when he played for Somerset against Hampshire. Somerset lost the match by a large margin, but after scoring 11 runs in the first innings, Challen made his team's highest score in the second, finishing with 93 runs. Challen, along with Stephen Newton, played a similar role in the next match; Somerset were trailing after both teams had batted their first innings, and after following-on, Challen and Newton resisted the Lancashire bowling. When Challen was dismissed for 42 runs, the Western Daily Press said that "it was felt that the chances of Somerset were very poor." They went on to lose by eight wickets. It was as a bowler that Challen was most effective in the following match against second-class Devon. In a spell described in the Exeter and Plymouth Gazette Daily Telegram as "destructive", Challen took four wickets in the first innings against a weak Devon side, helping Somerset earn victory by an innings. Challen completed the season with two further first-class appearances, return matches against Hampshire and Lancashire, in which he did not score many runs. In his four first-class matches in 1884, he scored 176 runs at an average of 25.14, and took seven wickets at 22.71. He also made six appearances for the East Somerset Cricket Club, where he was one of their top batsmen, scoring 155 runs at an average of just over 30.

The next season, Somerset struggled once again; they won just one of their six first-class fixtures. Challen was available for five of the six matches, and though he scored less prolifically than in the previous season, he ranked amongst the county's top batsmen; his 163 runs at 16.3 placed him fifth in the batting averages, and third by total number of runs. Of Challen's runs for Somerset that year, almost half came in one match, against Gloucestershire. In the first innings of that match, in which he scored 39 runs, Challen's batting was described by the Gloucester Citizen as "vigorous but rather lucky", while he was the final wicket to fall in the second innings, for 40.

Somerset were stripped of their first-class status in 1886; they had not played enough cricket the previous year, and when they did their performances had been below that expected of a top-level county side. Challen only played four county matches during the season; appearing three times for Somerset, and once for Northamptonshire. His scores between 1886 and 1889 were generally reasonably low, though he did score 91 runs against the MCC to help Somerset to victory at Lord's in 1888. He topped Somerset's batting averages in 1888, scoring 219 runs at 31.2. As a batsman, Somerset cricket historian Stephen Hill describes Challen as "a beautiful timer of the ball capable of taking the fight to the bowlers." However, Hill also notes that he often had to temper his game and play more steadily to accommodate some of the more reckless amateur batsmen in the Somerset team of the time. In 1889, Challen batted in seven innings for the county, averaging 21 runs, though his top-score was a relatively modest 28 not out.

The subsequent 1890 season was a successful one for Somerset; they were unbeaten in their thirteen county matches, winning twelve and tying the other. Challen was fourth in Somerset's batting averages, achieving his highest score of the season, 67, against Leicestershire. Later in the season, he also scored 49 of the 107 runs that Somerset managed during their tied match against Middlesex; his innings was described as "far and away the best innings of the side." Somerset's strong performance in 1890 saw them readmitted to first-class cricket in 1891, whereupon they joined the County Championship, a competition which had only been instituted the previous year. Challen, playing in a first-class match for the first time in over five years, only managed six runs against Middlesex in May that season, though Cricket magazine described the wicket as "not in favour of the batsmen" due to heavy rain. In Somerset's first win of 1891, Challen made modest scores of 41 and 18 not out, but he was praised for his steady play, both in a partnership with Lionel Palairet on the first day, and with his brother Richard Palairet towards the end of the game. Challen was praised later in the season for his resilient batting in difficult conditions against Lancashire's spin bowling duo of Johnny Briggs and Arthur Mold, though he could not prevent his side from losing. He scored his highest total of the season in mid-August against Surrey, playing "sound cricket with plenty of hit tempered by excellent defence" to score 89 runs in the second innings and help Somerset to victory. In the next match, he took advantage of difficult bowling conditions to score 79 runs against Gloucestershire during another win for Somerset. Challen finished the season top of the Somerset batting averages, and eleventh in the national averages, with 394 runs scored at 26.26.

In 1892, Challen played an "excellent innings" to score 45 runs against a strong Middlesex team, but could not offer any resistance in the second innings as Middlesex won by 112 runs. He played well again to give Somerset victory over Kent, when he scored 48 not out in the second innings, and a string of good results for the county led Cricket magazine to suggest that they "must not be overlooked" in the county championship race. In early August, Challen made a pair of centuries for the Old Wellingburians, scoring 166 against the Old Bedford Modernians, and 104 against Rolvenden. During a victory over Middlesex, Challen scored his highest total of the season, 72 runs scored in an hour and a half. Challen was fourth in the county batting averages, and 33rd nationally, scoring 835 runs at 22.33. Challen was missing for much of the early part of 1893, but performed well in both matches against Sussex that year. He scored 57 of Somerset's 137 runs in the first innings of their match in Brighton, while he played "free and attractive cricket without a mistake" to score 108 in two hours at Taunton. That score was both his highest score, and his only century in first-class cricket. He once again finished the season fourth in the county averages, with 311 runs at 25.91.

Though Challen was able to play six times for Somerset in 1894, he only managed to score 92 runs at an average of 7.66. His appearances became less frequent over the following years; he played for Somerset just once in 1895, five times in 1896, and then not again until 1899. He did score a half-century on his first match in 1896, but struggled in his later appearances. During two matches against the Nondescripts in 1899, Challen scored centuries in non-first-class matches, scoring 102 for a team he put together, and 100 exactly for North Devon Cricket Club. His final first-class appearance was against Gloucestershire from 28 to 30 August 1899, when he scored six runs in the first innings, and was not needed in the second as Somerset won by five wickets. He completed his career with 1,656 first-class runs at an average of 19.71, and sixteen wickets at 35.75.

=== Football ===
Challen made his first appearance for the Wales national football team in February 1887, playing against England in the 1886–87 British Home Championship. Wales lost the match 4–0. Challen appeared again the following month against Scotland, in a 2–0 loss for Wales. In each of these appearances, Challen is listed by The Times as representing Ruthin, but it is unclear if this refers to a football team, or just the place of his birth. He played his third match for Wales in February 1888, when they lost 5–1 to England, though Challen was praised for his play on the right-wing. His fourth and final international appearance came in March 1890, and was once again in a match against England. Though the Welsh lost 3–1, Challen was again praised for his play, and had two openings at goal, though he did not manage to score either.

Challen played football for Corinthian F.C., an amateur team which "[cherry-picked] the best players from leading sides". The club had been formed to provide the England national football team with players that were used to playing together, and during the late-1880s and early-1890s, the majority of England players also played for the Corinthians. As the club was strictly amateur, it did not compete in the FA Cup, and players could continue to represent other teams in professional competitions. Challen supplemented his matches for the Corinthians with appearances for Swifts F.C., based in Slough, Berkshire.

=== Rugby Union ===
Challen also played rugby union for Crediton RFC, between 1892 and 1895.

== Family ==
On 5 September 1893, Challen married Amy Price, in Willey, Warwickshire. She was the daughter of the Rev. Edward Henry Price, rector of Willey, and formerly Master of Philberds School, and his wife Annie Price, sister of Bonamy Price. They had one son, John Bonamy Rhys Challen (1895–1966), wounded at Cambrai with the Middlesex Regiment in 1917 and awarded the Military Cross.
