= Gordon Bates =

Bishop of Whitby

The Right Reverend Gordon Bates
- Bishop of Whitby
- Church: Church of England
- Diocese: Diocese of York
- In office: 1983 – 1999 (retired)
- Predecessor: Clifford Barker
- Successor: Robert Ladds
- Other posts: Honorary assistant bishop in York (2010–present); in Carlisle and in Blackburn (1999–2010)

Orders
- Ordination: 1958 (deacon); 1959 (priest)
- Consecration: 1983

Personal details
- Born: 16 March 1934 (age 92)
- Denomination: Anglican
- Parents: Ernest & Kathleen
- Spouse: Betty Vaux (m. 1960)
- Children: 2 daughters
- Profession: Youth chaplain
- Education: Kelham Theological College

Gordon Bates (born 16 March 1934) is a retired British Anglican bishop who was the eighth Bishop of Whitby.

== Ordained ministry ==
Bates received his ecclesiastical education at Kelham Theological College, being ordained deacon in 1958 and priest in 1959. After a curacy at Eltham he served as an Assistant Youth Chaplain in the Diocese of Gloucester, and then as Youth Chaplain in the Liverpool Diocese.

From 1965 he began a long association with Liverpool Cathedral, serving for four years as cathedral Chaplain. He served briefly as a parish priest at Huyton in Liverpool, before returning to the cathedral again as a Canon Residentiary and Precentor from 1973 to 1983.

Whilst serving as cathedral Precentor, Bates was concurrently the Diocesan Director of Ordinands for Liverpool Diocese.

From 1983 he was the Suffragan Bishop of Whitby, a post he held for 16 years.

He retired to Carnforth and is now an honorary assistant bishop within the Carlisle diocese. Towards the end of his episcopate he stated:

The Church has got to realise its missionary responsibilities. We live in a society, whether that be urban or rural, which is now basically second- or even third-generation pagan once again; and we cannot simply work on the premise that all we have to do to bring people to Christ is to ask them to remember their long-held, but dormant faith … in so many instances we have to go back to basics; we are in a critical missionary situation.

— CA News, April 1998

== Views ==
On 11 February 2017, fourteen retired bishops signed an open letter to the then-serving bishops of the Church of England. In an unprecedented move, they expressed their opposition to the House of Bishops' report to General Synod on sexuality, which recommended no change to the Church's canons or practices around sexuality. By 13 February, a serving bishop (Alan Wilson, Bishop of Buckingham) and nine further retired bishops — including Bates — had added their signatures; on 15 February, the report was rejected by synod.

Church of England titles
Preceded by Clifford Barker	Bishop of Whitby; 1983–1999	Succeeded by Robert Ladds
