= Kingston upon Hull College of Education =

Coordinates: 53.744°N 0.332°W

Kingston upon Hull College of Education was founded in 1913 as the "Hull Municipal Training College". The college had numerous name changes until September 1976 when it merged with the Hull College of Higher Education, which ultimately formed part of the University of Lincoln. The stimulus for the formation of the college was in response to a shortage of certified teachers in the city's schools. The college-trained teachers and educationalists for the city and beyond followed an ethos which was primarily set by Cyril Bibby, principal between 1959 and 1977. The college's first principal was Helen Todd.

== Principals ==
- 1913–1959: Miss Helen Todd
- 1959–1977: Cyril Bibby

== Alumni ==
- Elliot Morley (born 1952), disgraced Labour member of Parliament for Glanford and Scunthorpe from 1987 to 1997 and then Scunthorpe from 1997 to 2010 who was found guilty of fraud in the Parliamentary Expenses Scandal
- Theresa Tomlinson (born 1946), writer for children and young adults
