= Archdeacon of Newark =

Senior ecclesiastical officer in the Church of England

The Archdeacon of Newark is a senior ecclesiastical officer in the Church of England Diocese of Southwell and Nottingham.

== History ==
The archdeaconry of Newark was created by Order in Council on 11 June 1912 and comprises the northern and eastern parts of Southwell diocese. It is now one of two archdeaconries in that diocese, the other being the Archdeacon of Nottingham.

== List of archdeacons ==
- 1913–1936 (ret.): Egbert Hacking (afterwards archdeacon emeritus)
- 1936–1946 (ret.): John Hales
- 1947–1962 (res.): Francis West
- 1962–1965 (res.): Kenneth Thompson
- 1965–1979 (ret.): Brian Woodhams (afterwards archdeacon emeritus)
- 1980–1991 (res.): David Leaning
- 1992–1999 (res.): David Hawtin
- 1999–2011 (res.): Nigel Peyton
- 25 July 2011 – 19 February 2012 (Acting): Peter Hill, Archdeacon of Nottingham
- 19 February 2012 – 4 February 2020 (res.): David Picken
- 8 June 2021 – present: Tors Ramsey
