= Francis West (bishop) =

British Anglican bishop

Francis Horner West (9 January 1909 – 2 January 1999) was a British Anglican bishop. He was the Bishop of Taunton in the Church of England from 1962 until 1977.

West was educated at Berkhamsted School and Magdalene College, Cambridge. He was ordained as a deacon on 11 June 1933 (Trinity Sunday) at Leeds Parish Church and priest the next Trinity Sunday, 27 May 1934, at Christ Church, Harrogate — both times by Edward Burroughs, Bishop of Ripon. He was a curate at St Agnes Leeds and then chaplain of Ridley Hall, Cambridge. After wartime service as a Chaplain to the Forces he was vicar of Upton then Archdeacon of Newark before his ordination to the episcopate. He was consecrated a bishop on 2 February 1962 by Michael Ramsey, Archbishop of Canterbury, at Westminster Abbey. He was also an author – among others he wrote "Sparrows of the Spirit", 1957; "The Country Parish Today and Tomorrow", 1960; “F. R. B.: a portrait of Bishop F. R. Barry”, 1980; and "The Story of a Wiltshire Country Church", 1987.

Church of England titles
Preceded by Mark Hodson	Bishop of Taunton; 1962–1977	Succeeded by Peter Nott
