= Barry Dugmore =

Barry Dugmore (born 1961) is an Anglican priest who has served as Archdeacon Missioner in the Diocese of Coventry since October 2019.

Dugmore trained through the Southern Theological Education and Training Scheme and was ordained in 2002. His first post was a curacy in Cowplain. He was the incumbent at Tiverton from 2007 to 2015; and Mission Enabler for the Diocese of Exeter from 2015 until his appointment as an archdeacon.

Church of England titles
Preceded by Morris Rodham	Archdeacon Missioner; Diocese of Coventry	Succeeded by Incumbent
