= Michael Everitt =

British Anglican priest

The Venerable Michael Everitt
- Archdeacon of Lancaster
- Church: Church of England
- Diocese: Diocese of Blackburn
- In office: 2011 to 2019
- Predecessor: Peter Ballard
- Successor: David Picken

Personal details
- Born: August 26, 1968 (age 57)
- Denomination: Anglicanism
- Education: Warriner School, Banbury School
- Alma mater: King's College London; Queen's College, Edgbaston; Venerable English College, Rome

Michael John Everitt (born 26 August 1968, in Banbury) is a British Anglican priest.

== Early life and education ==
Everitt was born on 26 August 1968 in Banbury, Oxfordshire, England. He was educated at Warriner School, Bloxham and Banbury School. He studied at King's College, London, graduating with a Bachelor of Divinity (BD) degree and the Associate of King's College (AKC) award in 1990. That year, he entered the Queen's College, Birmingham to train for ordination. He spent 1991 at the Venerable English College, Rome, a Roman Catholic seminary in Rome, before returning to Birmingham to complete a Diploma in Theology (DipTh) in 1992.

== Ordained ministry ==
Ordained in 1992, his first post was as a curate at St Andrew's Cleveleys. After this he was succentor and then precentor of Bloemfontein Cathedral. From 1998 to 2002 he was chaplain at St Martin's College, Lancaster then rector of St Wilfrid's Standish until his archdeacon’s appointment.

From 2011 to 2019, Everitt was Archdeacon of Lancaster in the Diocese of Blackburn; he became archdeacon emeritus upon stepping down. In April 2019, it was announced that he would be the next canon pastor of Durham Cathedral in the Diocese of Durham: he was installed as a canon residentiary at Durham Cathedral on 22 September 2019. In July 2025, it was announced that he had been appointed interim Dean of Carlisle, to take up the post in August 2025.
