= Robert Waring Darwin of Elston =

English botanist

Robert Waring Darwin
- Born: 17 October 1724; Nottinghamshire, England
- Died: 4 November 1816 (aged 92); Nottinghamshire, England
- Education: Chesterfield Grammar School
- Parents: Robert Darwin (father); Elizabeth Hill (mother)
- Relatives: See Darwin–Wedgwood family
- Scientific career
- Fields: Botany
- Author abbrev. (botany): R.W.Darwin

Robert Waring Darwin (17 October 1724 – 4 November 1816) of Elston Hall was an English botanist and the great-uncle of naturalist Charles Robert Darwin.

== Biography ==
He was the eldest son of Robert Darwin of Elston (1682–1754), a lawyer, and his wife Elizabeth Hill (1702–1797). His brothers were William Alvey Darwin (1726–1783), Erasmus Darwin (1731–1802), the poet, philosopher, physician, etc., and Rev. John Darwin (1730–1805), rector of Elston. He was baptized as a Christian. He never married and had no children, but his nephew Dr Robert Waring Darwin, son of Erasmus and father of Charles Darwin, took his name.

He was educated at Chesterfield Grammar School, and St John's College, Cambridge although he apparently did not take a degree, but became a lawyer of Lincoln's Inn and Gray's Inn. He inherited Elston Hall on the death of his father in 1754.

He was a Linnean, fully adopting the classification system developed by Carl von Linné, based on binomial nomenclature and in 1787 he published Principia Botanica (full title: Principia Botanica or, a Concise and Easy Introduction to the Sexual Botany of Linnaeus), an introduction to the Linnean system of taxonomy. His famous great-nephew Charles notes, in his autobiography:

The eldest son of Robert, christened Robert Waring, succeeded to the estate of Elston, and died there at the age of ninety-two, a bachelor. He had a strong taste for poetry, like his youngest brother Erasmus, as I infer from the later having dedicated an MS. volume of juvenile poems to him, with the words, "By whose example and encouragement my mind was directed to the study of poetry in my very early years". The two brothers also corresponded together in verse. Robert also cultivated botany, and, when an oldish man, he published his Principia Botanica. This book in MS. was beautifully written, and my father [Dr. R.W. Darwin] declared that he believed it was published because his old uncle could not endure that such fine calligraphy should be wasted. But this was hardly just, as the work contains many curious notes on biology — a subject wholly neglected in England in the last century. The public, moreover, appreciated the book, as the copy in my possession is the third edition.
