= Robert Darwin of Elston =

English lawyer and physician (1682–1754)

- Born: 12 August 1682; England
- Died: 20 November 1754 (aged 72)
- Occupation(s): Lawyer and physician
- Spouse: Elizabeth Hill
- Children: 7, including Robert Waring Darwin of Elston and Erasmus Darwin
- Father: William Darwin
- Relatives: Charles Darwin (great-grandson)

Robert Darwin of Elston (12 August 1682 — 20 November 1754) was an English lawyer, scientist and physician. He was the father of English physician Erasmus Darwin, and a great-grandfather of the famous English naturalist and geologist Charles Darwin, best known for his contributions to evolution. It is with Robert Darwin of Elston, Nottinghamshire that many biographies of his great-grandson begin.

In 1719, Darwin was instrumental in bringing the attention of the Royal Society to the first remains of a Jurassic reptile to be found: a fossilised plesiosaur, that would originally have been about three metres (9.8 ft) long. The stone came from a quarry at Fulbeck and had been used, with the fossil on its underside, to reinforce the edge of a well in Elston. After the strange bones it contained had been discovered, it was displayed in the garden of the local parsonage by the rector, the Rev. John South, as a curiosity. Darwin communicated with William Stukeley who obtained the fossil for the Royal Society and described it in a paper in the Philosophical Transactions of the Royal Society, calling it "a Rarity, the like whereof has not been observ'd before in this Island". Stukeley speculated on the reasons for the fossil's presence in rock, mentioning the Biblical flood: he said that it was not human, but was probably a crocodile or porpoise. The specimen is today on display in the Natural History Museum as Plesiosaurus dolichodeirus, with the original registration number NHMUK R.1330. It is the earliest discovered more or less complete fossil reptile skeleton in a museum collection.

== Family ==
Darwin married Elizabeth Hill (1702–1797) on 1 January 1724 at Balderton, Nottinghamshire. They had four sons and three daughters:

- Robert Waring Darwin of Elston (1724–1816), lawyer and botanist
- Elizabeth Darwin (15 September 1725 – 8 April 1800)
- William Alvey Darwin (1726–1783)
- Anne Darwin (12 November 1727 – 3 August 1813)
- Susannah Darwin (10 April 1729 – 29 September 1789)
- Rev. John Darwin (1730–1805), rector of Elston
- Erasmus Darwin (1731–1802), the poet, philosopher, physician, etc.
