= The Philberds =

Former school in Berkshire, England

The Philberds was a preparatory school based in a house in Holyport, near Maidenhead, Berkshire, on the site of one which Charles II had given to Nell Gwyn. The name derives from a family that owned land in the area in medieval times.

== School founder Edward Henry Price ==
Edward Henry Price (1822–1898) was educated at Rugby School under Thomas Arnold, arriving in May 1835 at aged 13. He matriculated at St John's College, Cambridge, in 1841and graduating B.A. in 1845, M.A. in 1863.

Ordained deacon in 1845 and priest in 1846, Price spent the years 1845 to 1853 at Lutterworth as a curate. He founded The Philberds in 1862, having previously founded a school at Tarvin in Cheshire, which he moved to become Mostyn House School in Cheshire in 1855. In 1862 he sold Mostyn House School to Algernon Sydney Grenfell.

Price was headmaster of The Philberds from 1862 until 1879. The initial school fee was 80 guineas per annum. He succeeded in building the reputation of Philberds as a preparatory school. He then took the living of Kimbolton.

== Later history ==
Frederick William Stephen Price, one of the sons, took over the school. He later was head of Ovingdean Hall School. In 1885, the partnership he had with his brother Edward Matthew Price as schoolmasters at The Philberds was dissolved. He left the school in the charge of his brother Edward and another brother, Herbert Johnson Price.

In 1898 Frank Watkinson took over the school—an Oxford B.A. in 1892, he had been an assistant master at Mostyn House School. In 1904 Charles R. Lupton moved his school from Farnborough, Hampshire, to The Philberds.

The school survived until the start of World War I. During the war, the manor building was used as an internment camp for German prisoners of war, and in 1919 it was demolished.

== Notable individuals associated with the school ==
Pupils:

- John Challen, cricketer for Somerset and football international for Wales (played at least two games for the Old Philberdians in 1877)
- Major Alexis Charles Doxat VC
- William Pasteur, discoverer of atelectasis
- Vice-Admiral Cecil Vivian Usborne, Director of Naval Intelligence

Teachers:

- Charles Henry Major, chief justice of British Guiana (schoolmaster and goalkeeper for the Old Philberdians)
- Graham Wallas, political scientist (Latin teacher)

== See also ==
- Old Philberdians F.C.
