= Stephen Pullin =

- Archdeacon of Berkshire
- Diocese: Diocese of Oxford
- In office: 2020-
- Predecessor: Olivia Graham

Orders
- Ordination: 2004 (deacon); 2005 (priest)

Personal details
- Born: 1966 (age 59–60)
- Denomination: Anglicanism
- Education: South Bank University

Stephen James Pullin is an Anglican priest.

Pullin was educated at South Bank University. After two curacies in Bristol he was Bishop's Advisor for Deliverance Ministry from 2010 to 2014. He was in charge at Reading Minster and area dean until his appointment as Archdeacon of Berkshire in 2020.
