= Robert Ladds =

English Anglican bishop (born 1941)

The Right Reverend Robert Ladds SSC
- Bishop of Whitby
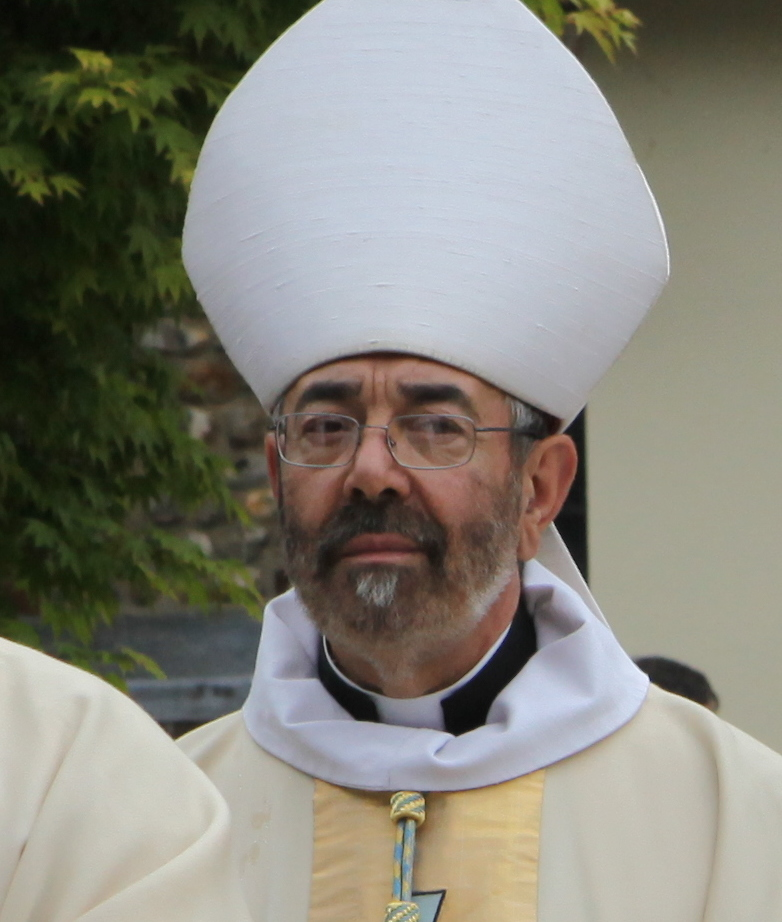
- Ladds in 2009
- Church: Church of England
- Province: York
- Diocese: York
- See: Whitby
- In office: 1999–2008
- Predecessor: Gordon Bates
- Successor: Martin Warner
- Other posts: Honorary assistant bishop in London (2009–present); Archdeacon of Lancaster (1997–1999); Currently Superior general of The Society of Mary (Anglican)

Orders
- Ordination: 1980 (deacon); 1981 (priest)
- Consecration: 29 September 1999 by David Hope

Personal details
- Born: 15 November 1941 (age 84)
- Denomination: Anglican
- Parents: Sidney and Joan Cant
- Spouse: Roberta Sparkes (m. 1964)
- Children: 3 sons
- Profession: Bishop (former chemist and schoolmaster)
- Education: Christ Church College Canterbury

Robert Sidney Ladds SSC (born 15 November 1941) is an English Anglican bishop. From 1999 to 2008, he served as the Bishop of Whitby, a suffragan bishop in the Diocese of York.

== Early life and education ==
Ladds was born on 15 November 1941. After school, he worked as an industrial research chemist from 1959 to 1968. He then attended Christ Church College, Canterbury to train as a teacher. He completed a Certificate in Education (CertEd) in 1970 and a Bachelor of Education (BEd Hons) degree in 1971: these qualifications were validated by the University of London. He was awarded the Licentiate of the Royal Society of Chemistry (LRSC) in 1972. He was a chemistry teacher at Borden Grammar School, an all-boys school in Sittingbourne, before being ordained.

== Ordained ministry ==
Having trained on a part-time basis with the Canterbury School of Ministry, Ladds was ordained in the Church of England as a deacon in 1980 and as a priest in 1981. He began his ordained ministry as a curate in Hythe, Kent. From 1983 to 1991, he was Rector of St John the Baptist's Church, Bretherton in the Diocese of Blackburn. He was additionally school chaplain of Bishop Rawstorne Church of England Academy from 1983 to 1987 and Bishop of Blackburn's chaplain for ministry from 1986 to 1990. From 1991 to 1997, he served successively as priest in charge and then rector of Preston. He was made an honorary canon of Blackburn Cathedral in 1993. He then served as Archdeacon of Lancaster from 1997 to 1999.

=== Episcopal ministry ===
Ladds was consecrated a bishop on 29 September 1999 during a service at York Minster. He served as Bishop of Whitby, a suffragan bishop in the Diocese of York from 1999 to 2008.

Ladds retired from full-time ministry in 2009 at the age of 68. He has maintained an active retirement. He has been an honorary assistant bishop in the Diocese of London since 2009. He was house-for-duty priest of St Mary and Christ Church, Hendon from 2009 to 2015. He was then an honorary curate of St Peter's, London Docks from 2015 to 2021.

He has been the current Superior-General of the Society of Mary since 2000.

=== Views ===
Ladds rejects the ordination of women as priests and bishops. He is a retired bishop of The Society, a traditional Anglo-Catholic association of Church of England.

Church of England titles
Preceded by Gordon Bates	Bishop of Whitby; 1999–2008	Succeeded by Martin Warner
