= Mostyn House School =

Former school in Cheshire, England

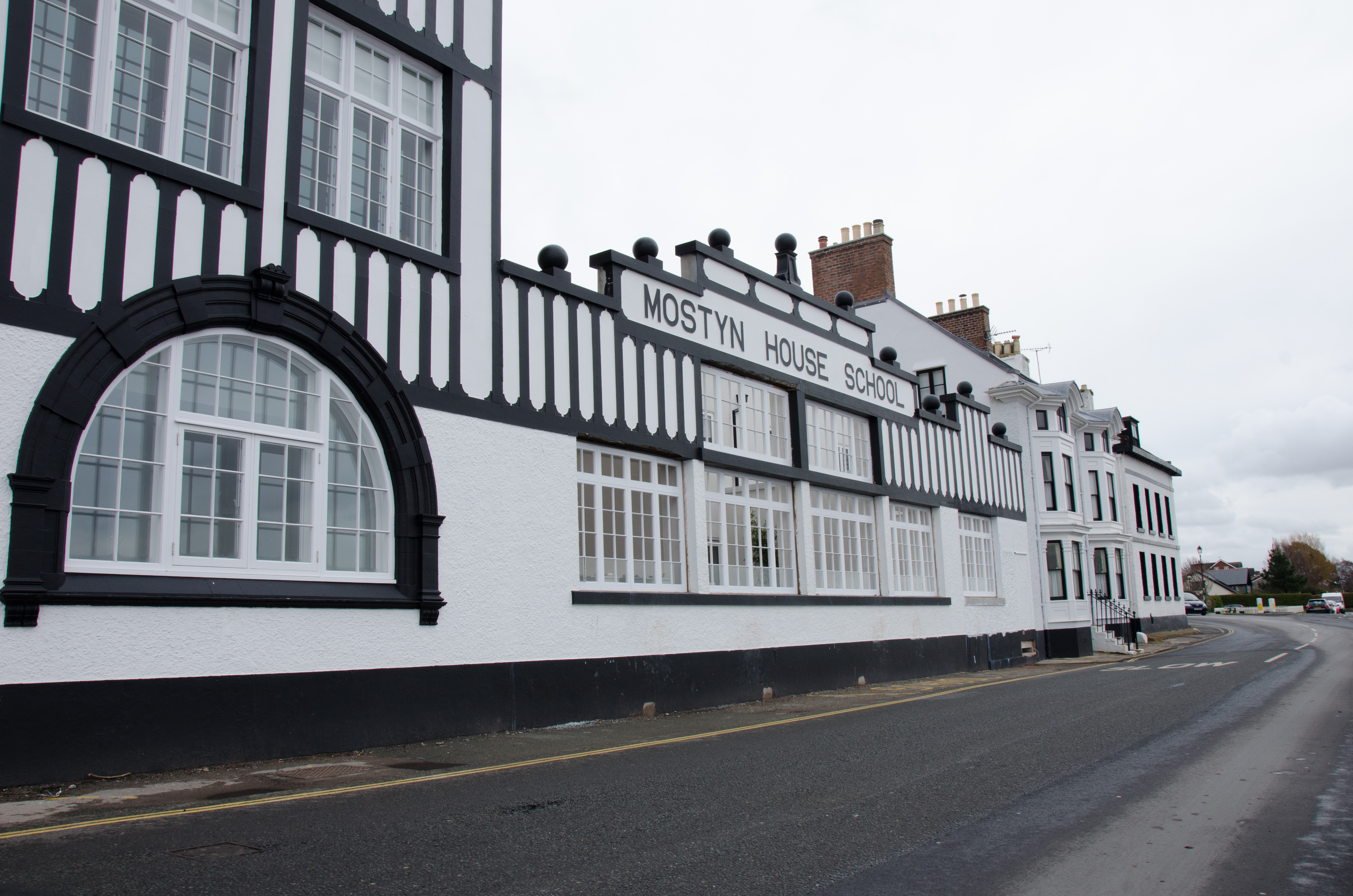
The school pictured in 2015

Mostyn House School was a school that was originally opened in Tarvin by Edward Henry Price, and moved to Parkgate, Cheshire, in 1855. From 1862 until it closed in 2010, it was run by the Grenfell family, originally as a boys' boarding school, and from 1985 as a co-educational day school.

== Design ==
The school's chapel, now a Grade II* listed building, was designed by Frederick Fraser and Warburton, with input by the headmaster of the school, A. G. Grenfell. Construction work began in 1895 and continued for two years. It is built in red Ruabon brick with terracotta dressings, and has a red-tiled roof with a finial at the east end. The chapel consists of a nave and chancel in a single range, an apsidal east end, and a west bellcote. The furnishings are in collegiate style, designed by Frederick Fraser. In the windows is painted glass made by Morton and Company of Liverpool. The school and its chapel are Grade II listed buildings.

Extensive building work to expand the school's facilities was carried out between 1890 and 1893; this included construction of a dining room, dormitories, bathrooms, a swimming pool and a covered playground. The frontage of the school on The Parade, Parkgate, was buttressed and decorated with its distinctive black and white appearance in 1932.

== Carillon ==
The school's carillon was commissioned in 1918 to commemorate old boys who had died in the war. Upon the closure of the school in 2010 the bells were transported and reinstalled at Charterhouse School in line with the wishes of A.G. Grenfell who wished that if ever Mostyn House ceased to be a school the carillon would be offered to Charterhouse so "that they may go on speaking to English boys as long as England lasts".

== Notable alumni ==
Sir Wilfred Grenfell (1865–1940), medical missionary to Newfoundland and Labrador, was born in Parkgate and was a pupil at the school. The 6th Duke of Westminster's children attended Mostyn House, including Hugh Grosvenor, 7th Duke of Westminster.

Other notable alumni include:

- George Ward Gunn
- Leonard Monk Isitt
- David Partridge
- Gershom Stewart
- James Ward

== Gallery ==
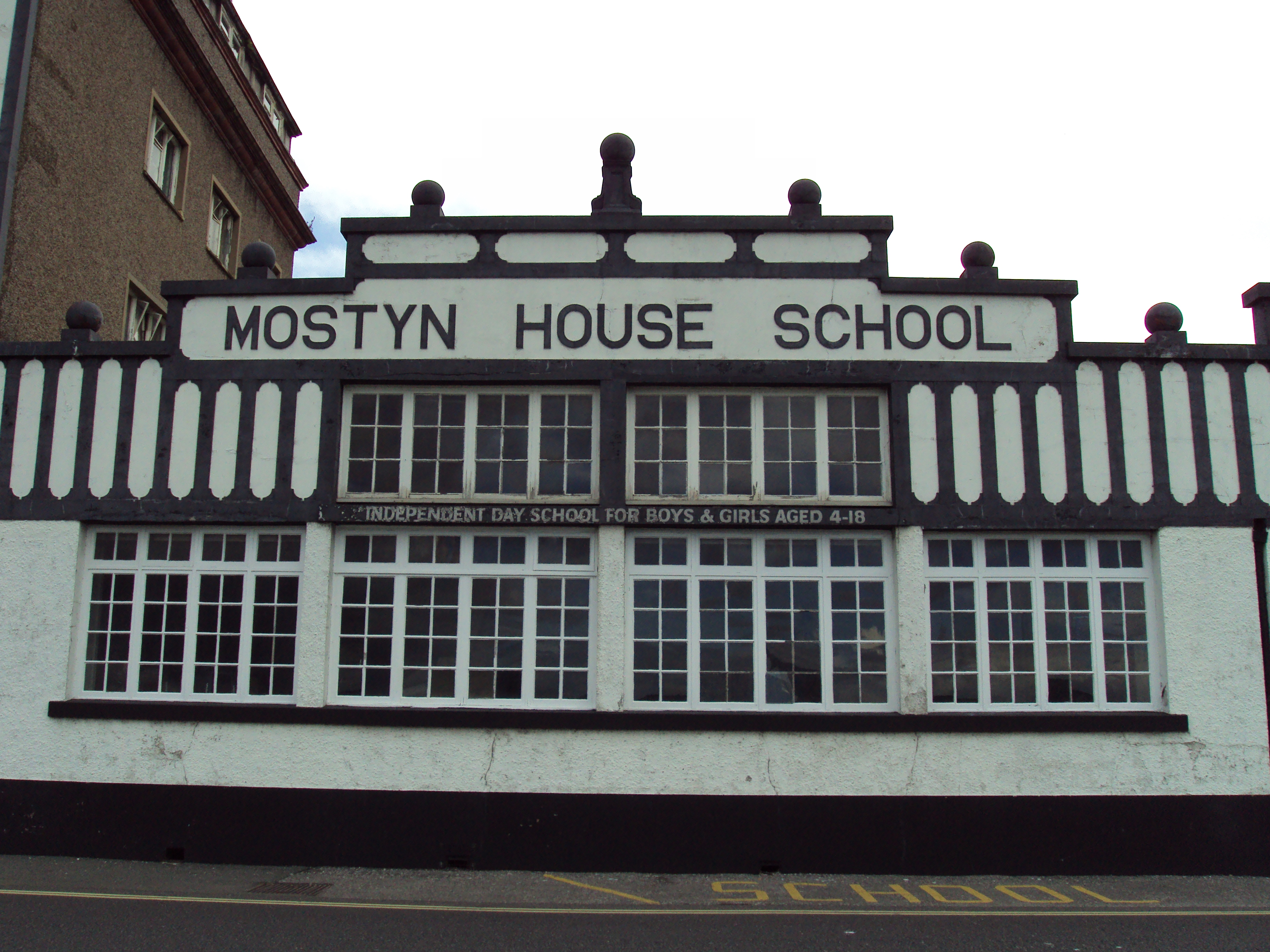

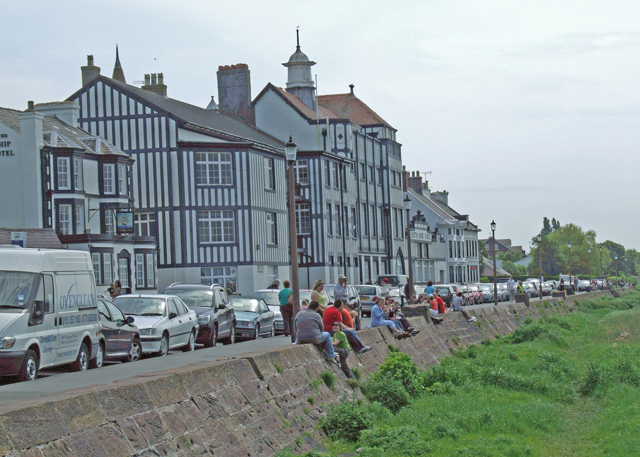

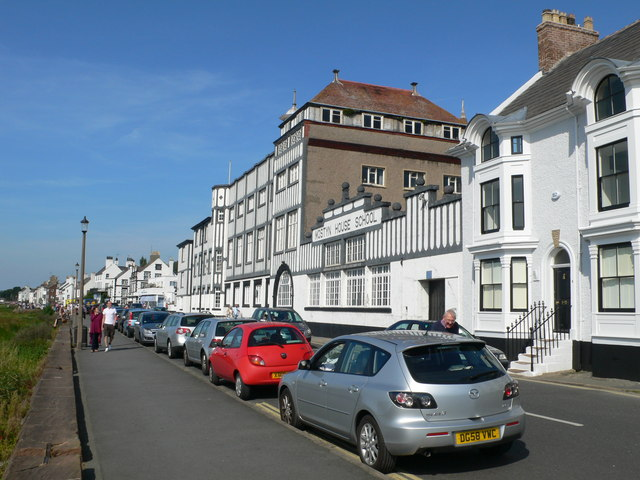

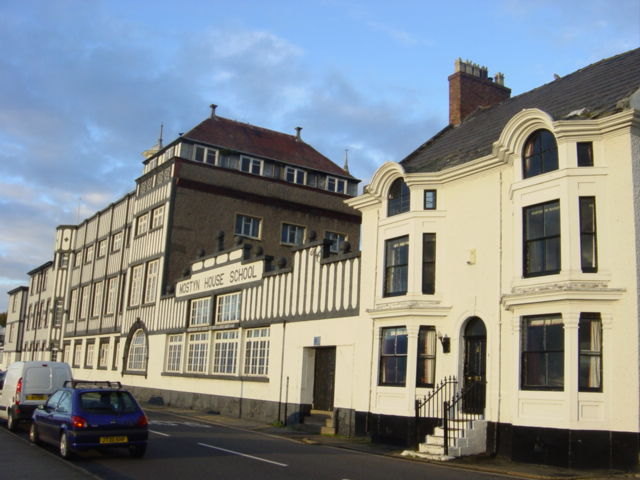

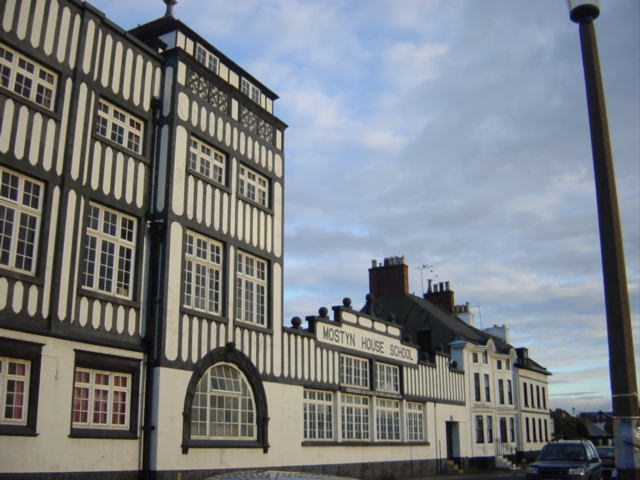
