= Henry Fosbrooke =

British Archdeacon (1876–1950)

Henry Leonard Fosbrooke (11 September 1876 – 10 March 1950) was an Anglican priest in the 20th century.

He was educated at Clare College, Cambridge and ordained in 1900. After curacies in Carlinghow and West Didsbury he held incumbencies in Pendleton, North Somercotes, St Michael's on Wyre before his appointment as Archdeacon of Blackburn; and Lytham St Annes afterwards when he was Archdeacon of Lancaster

Church of England titles
Preceded by Atherton Gwillym Rawstorne	Archdeacon of Blackburn; 1935–1936	Succeeded by Richard Newman
Preceded by Phipps John Hornby	Archdeacon of Lancaster; 1936–1950	Succeeded by Benjamin Pollard
