= William Bonsey =

William Bonsey (13 December 1845 – 13 January 1909) was Archdeacon of Lancaster from 1905 to 1909.

== Life ==
He was the son of William Bonsey of Belle Vue, Slough. He was educated at St John's College, Cambridge and ordained deacon in 1868 and priest in 1869. He held incumbencies in Corfe, Northaw and Lancaster.

Later Bonsey was Proctor in Convocation for the Archdeaconry of Lancaster; Chaplain at Lancaster Castle; Chaplain to the Forces at Bowerham Barracks, Lancaster; Chaplain to the 2nd battalion of the King's Own Royal Lancaster Regiment; and Rural Dean of Lancaster. He was made an Honorary Canon of Manchester Cathedral in 1898.

== Family ==
Bonsey married in 1872 Susan Edith Yerburgh, daughter of the Rev. Richard Yerburgh. They had seven sons and one daughter.

Church of England titles
Preceded by Arthur Clarke	Archdeacon of Lancaster; 1905–1909	Succeeded by Phipps Hornby
