= Len Carney =

English footballer

Personal information
- Full name: Leonard Francis Carney
- Date of birth: 30 May 1915
- Place of birth: Liverpool, England
- Date of death: March 1996 (aged 80)
- Position: Inside forward

Senior career*
Years	Team	Apps	(Gls)
- Liverpool University
- Northern Nomads
- Marine
- Collegiate Old Boys
1939–1946	Liverpool (wartime)	33	(15)
1946–1948	Liverpool	6	(1)
Total		39	(16)
- * Club domestic league appearances and goals

Leonard Francis Carney DSO (30 May 1915 – March 1996) was an English professional footballer who played as an inside forward.

== Career ==
Born in Liverpool, Carney was a University graduate who became a history teacher, eventually becoming headmaster at Chadderton Grammar School. He played amateur football for Liverpool University, Northern Nomads, Marine and Collegiate Old Boys, before signing for Liverpool in 1939. After making 33 wartime appearances, Carney made his debut in the Football League on 31 August 1946, the opening day of the 1946–47 season. He made a further five league appearances for Liverpool before leaving the club in 1948.

== Personal life ==
Carney served in the British Armed Forces during the Second World War. He was awarded the Distinguished Service Order for service in Italy.
