= Tors Ramsey =

Welsh Anglican priest

Victoria Claire "Tors" Ramsey (born 1971) is a Welsh Anglican priest. Since June 2021, she has been Archdeacon of Newark in the Diocese of Southwell and Nottingham.

Ramsey grew up in South Wales, and her first career was as a speech and language therapist in the National Health Service. She was ordained in the Church of England as a deacon in 2011 and as a priest in 2012. She was a curate in Diocese of Exeter from 2011 to 2018, and then a church growth and planting enabler for the Diocese of Southwell and Nottingham.
