= Archdeacon of Lancaster =

Church of England ecclesiastical office

The Archdeacon of Lancaster is a senior ecclesiastical officer within the Diocese of Blackburn. Originally created in the Diocese of Manchester it became part of the new Diocese of Blackburn in 1926.

As Archdeacon, they are responsible for the disciplinary supervision of the clergy within the seven area deaneries: Blackpool, Garstang, Kirkham, Lancaster & Morecambe, Poulton, Preston and Tunstall.

The post was created, simultaneously with Manchester diocese, from the Archdeaconry of Chester on 31 August 1847 but remained unfilled until 1870; and is currently vacant.

== List of archdeacons ==
- 1847–1870: Post vacant
- 1870–1895 (ret.): William Hornby (1810–1899)
- 1896–1905 (res.): Arthur Clarke
- 1905–1909 (d.): William Bonsey (1845–1909)
- 1909–1936 (d.): Phipps Hornby (1853–1936; son of William)

The archdeaconry was transferred from the diocese of Manchester to the newly created diocese of Blackburn by Order-in-Council on 12 November 1926.

- 1936–1950 (d.): Henry Fosbrooke
- 1950–1954 (res.): Benjamin Pollard, Bishop suffragan of Lancaster
- 1955–1959 (res.): Gordon Fallows
- 1959–1966 (ret.): Charles Lambert (afterwards archdeacon emeritus)
- 1966–1980 (ret.): Geoffrey Gower-Jones (afterwards archdeacon emeritus)
- 1981–1997 (ret.): Ken Gibbons (afterwards archdeacon emeritus)
- 1997–1999 (res.): Robert Ladds (afterward Bishop suffragan of Whitby)
- 1999–2005 (res.): Colin Williams (afterwards archdeacon emeritus; born 1952)
- 2005–2010 (res.): Peter Ballard (born 1955)
- March 2011 – 22 September 2019 (res.): Michael Everitt
  - 13 April 2017 – present: Simon Cox, Temporary Assistant Archdeacon
- 4 February 2020 – present: David Picken
