= Bishop Rawstorne Church of England Academy =

Location
- Highfield Road; Croston; Lancashire, PR26 9HH; England
- 53.6635°N 2.7701°W

Information
- Type: Academy
- Motto: Fortiter et fideliter (Bravely and faithfully)
- Religious affiliation: Church of England
- Established: 1960
- Department for Education URN: 137296 Tables
- Ofsted: Reports
- Headmaster: Paul Cowley
- Gender: Coeducational
- Age: 11 to 16
- Colour: Navy
- Website: http://www.bishopr.co.uk

Bishop Rawstorne Church of England Academy (formerly Bishop Rawstorne CofE Language College) is a coeducational secondary school with academy status situated in the village of Croston, Lancashire, England.

== About the school ==
Pupils are drawn from a wide area and the school is over-subscribed, catering from ages 11 to 16. The school was awarded a DfES Teacher Training rating in late 2000 by the then Secretary of State for Education, David Blunkett MP.

The school is a small campus containing several blocks housing various faculties. An extension of the music department (opened by Paul McKenna, then-captain of Preston North End) allowed the opening of a music school.

== History ==
Plans for a secondary school in Croston date to the 1930s, when enthusiasm for a church secondary school in the area was spurred on by Atherton Rawstorne, better known as Bishop Rawstorne, who served as Croston's rector during 1894–1932. Towards the end of his life, Rawstorne was planning for the founding of a church secondary school in Croston and funds were raised towards the cause following his death in 1936. Rawstorne also served as Archdeacon of Blackburn from 1922 to 1936 and the Bishop of Whalley from 1909 to 1936. The future school would later be named in his memory, while the school badge would include the arms of the Rawstorne family.

Proposals for the school first appeared on the list for Major Building Programmes in 1956-57, where it was placed on the reserve list over several years. The first draft plans were submitted in November 1955 and formally approved in August 1956 following various revisions. A report in December 1958 indicated an estimated construction cost of just under £80,000, although estimates had risen closer to £100,000 by the time of construction, with the cost split between the nearby parishes. It was deemed necessary to have a secondary school accessible to the nearby villages, such as Croston, Eccleston and Mawdesley, which all had moderately sized populations. Tenders for construction were considered in April 1959, with construction anticipated to start that summer and completed by the end of 1960. Funding for the school became available following delays in other projects around the country from commencing.

Bishop Rawstorne Church of England Secondary School school was officially opened in September 1960 by Wilfred Askwith, Bishop of Gloucester and could educate 300 pupils. Upon opening, Lancashire's Chief Education Officer, Percy Lord, remarked that had construction started a little later, the church authority would have had the opportunity to request a larger school, which was becoming more common at the turn of the decade. In June 1961, the school raised £650 through a fete on the school playground to help towards operating costs, of which £2,000 was immediately needed to meet existing commitments. The school expanded its capacity in 1970, moving from a two-form to six-form cohort, with provisions also considered for a sixth form college.

=== Later history ===
The schools' specialist language status was awarded in 1996. Language exchanges have taken place between Bishop Rawstorne and foreign schools, since twinning with Collège Honoré de Balzac, Azay-le-Rideau, France, in 1982 and a foreign exchange in 1985. The school taught compulsory French and German to year 11, and Spanish starting in year 7 (2009-) with an option to continue to GCSE level. Other languages such as Japanese, Italian, Chinese, Russian, Swedish, Magyar and Polish were available as extra-curricular activities. The school undertakes various trips abroad to Europe each year for years 7, 9 and 10. The school has won awards for its language status, including the International School Award in 2004, awarded by the Department for Education and Skills and the British Council. In 2006 the school successfully applied to participate in the Connecting Classrooms project, which involves linking UK schools with schools in Mozambique and Uganda.

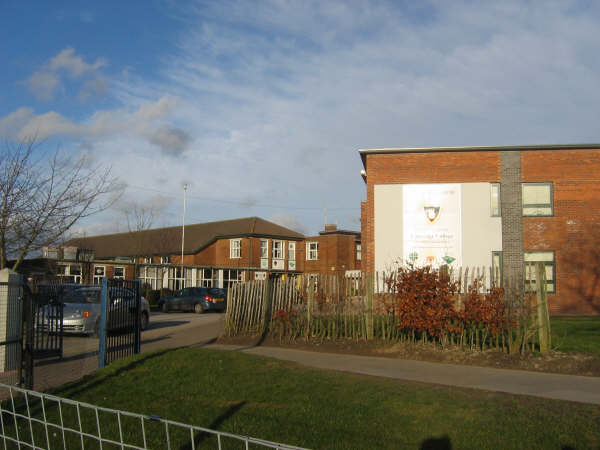
Front of the academy in 2005

Since the school became an academy in 2011, it decreased the number of languages on offer as they no longer had language college status. Since 2017, the school has taught only German as a foreign language.

In March 2012, Bishop Rawstorne was one of only about 100 schools in England to be granted Teaching School status in the second cohort of applications.

In July 2020 the head teacher, Paul Cowley, sent a circular letter to parents accusing their children of not engaging or working hard enough during the lockdown imposed in the UK as the result of the COVID-19 pandemic. Parents complained to the press that the school had failed to provide adequate online teaching and that the letter accused them for not engaging their children.

== Religious ethos ==
The school, which is in the Diocese of Blackburn, has a strong Church of England religious emphasis. In 2007 the school was rated highly in a denominational report. The school has a chaplaincy team made up of priests from the Church of England. It is a Christian school with Christian values.

== Performance ==
According to a 2021 OFSTED report, the school's' performance was rated as 'good' a downgrading from the previous 2007 rating of 'outstanding'. In 2008 the school had 29% A* to A grades earning a rank of 35, down on the previous year of 34% with a rank of 11. However, 2009 saw an increase to 42.5% A*/A grades, improving rank to 8. Scores are usually above average in the country and in local league tables. The school has increasingly high GCSE grades, where in 2007 the school attained 84% A*-C grades, compared to 58% in 2001, making it within the top 10% of UK schools. The school's performance continued upwards and by 2010, it attained 90.1% A*-C grades (85% A*-C inc. English & Maths). In 2018 the school achieved a 91% standard pass in English Language and Maths (9-4 grades), an improvement of 4.5% on the scores from 2017. In addition 72% of students achieved a strong pass in both subjects (9-5 grades). Furthermore in English Language and Maths respectively, 47.5% and 30.7% of students achieved a 7-9 grade, equivalent to an A* or A grade previously.
