= Rawstorne =

Rawstorne is a surname. Notable people with the surname include:

- Atherton Rawstorne (1855–1936), British bishop, son of Robert
- George Rawstorne (1895–1962), British soldier and cricketer
- Robert Rawstorne (1824–1902), British archdeacon

== See also ==
- Rawsthorne
