= Christ Church, Pitsmoor =

Church in Sheffield, South Yorkshire, England

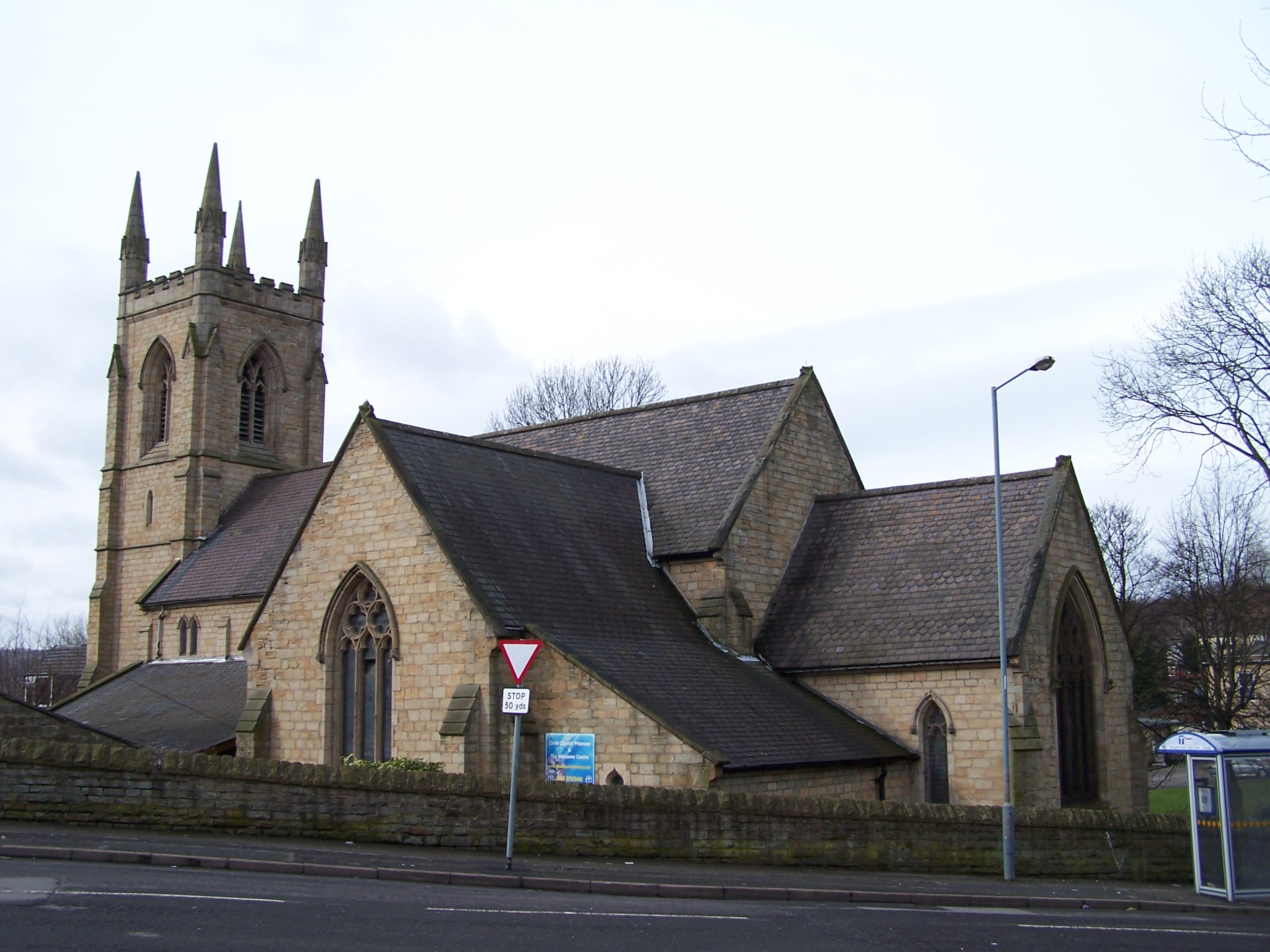
- Christ Church, seen from the south

- Location within Sheffield
- 53.3972°N 1.4646°W
- OS grid reference: SK 35514 89018
- Location: Pitsmoor, Sheffield, South Yorkshire
- Country: England
- Denomination: Church of England
- Website: christchurchpitsmoor.com

Architecture
- Functional status: Active
- Heritage designation: Grade II
- Architect: Flockton & Son
- Style: Gothic revival
- Completed: 1850
- Construction cost: £2,707 (equivalent to £320,000 in 2025)

Administration
- Diocese: Diocese of Sheffield
- Archdeaconry: Sheffield and Rotherham
- Deanery: Ecclesfield Deanery
- Benefice: Pitsmoor Christ Church

Christ Church is an Anglican church in the Pitsmoor district, north of Sheffield City Centre in South Yorkshire, England. It is a Grade II listed building.

== History ==
By the mid-19th century, rapid population growth in the north of Sheffield led the Church of England to construct new churches in the area. Formerly covered by the Brightside area of Sheffield parish, the Ecclesiastical Commissioners created three new parishes, of Brightside, Pitsmoor, and Wicker, and arranged for the construction of a new church in each parish.

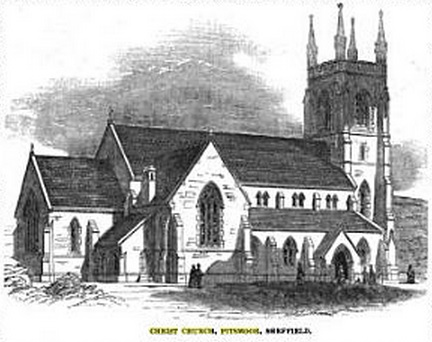
Christ Church on completion in 1850.

The Ecclesiastical Commissioners gave £507 towards the construction of the church, with £2200 being raised in private donations; the Commissioners also gave an endowment of £150 per year. The building was designed by local architects Flockton & Son and constructed from 1849 to 1850. It was consecrated on 15 August 1850. The Pevsner Guide describes the church as "large and handsome, built to cater for an affluent congregation". Returns of 1851 state that the church was attracting around 200 people to each of three sittings.

The church was restored in 1907, while most of the fixtures and fittings were replaced in 1913, including the font and pulpit, and the floor of the chancel and baptistery, which is a mosaic. Several stained glass windows were added over the years. To the east is one of the Crucifixion and Ascension, featuring Saint Wilfred and Saint Helena, dating from 1903. To the north are two dating from 1915: one of Christ Blessing Little Children, and one designed by Kayll and Reed of Works of Charity. In the 1980s, a church hall, designed by Ken Murta and Austin Peter Fawcett, was added to the south of the church.

Christ Church is a member of Inclusive Church.

== Notable people ==
Notable people associated with the church include Martyn Snow, Bishop of Leicester, who served as vicar from 2001 until 2010, and John Marsh, former Archdeacon of Blackburn, who was curate in the 1980s.

== See also ==
- Listed buildings in Sheffield
- List of Commissioners' churches in Yorkshire
