= Mark Ireland (priest) =

British Anglican priest (born 1960)

Mark Campbell Ireland (born 5 April 1960) is a British retired Anglican priest who served as Archdeacon of Blackburn from 2016 until his 2025 retirement.

Ireland was educated at University of St Andrews and Wycliffe Hall Oxford; and ordained in 1985. He was a director of Saltmine Trust (company 02930528) from 2005 to 2008. After curacies in Blackburn and Lancaster he held incumbencies in Baxenden, Walsall and Wellington with Eyton before his archdeacon's appointment.

He is a member of the General Synod of the Church of England. In relation to same-sex marriage, Ireland has stated: "I want to maintain the church's traditional doctrine of marriage, but also to belong to a church that truly welcomes and includes gay and lesbian people."

Ireland retired April 2025.

Church of England titles
Preceded by John Hawley	Archdeacon of Blackburn; 2016–2025	TBA
