= Acting rank =

Military designation

An acting rank is a designation that allows military personnel to assume a higher military rank, which is usually temporary. They may assume that rank either with or without the pay and allowances appropriate to that grade, depending on the nature of the acting promotion. An acting officer may be ordered back to the previous grade. This situation may arise when a lower-ranking officer is called upon to replace a senior officer or fill a position higher than the incumbent rank.

== United States Navy usage ==
In the United States Navy, acting appointments were common during the 19th century. The number of commissioned naval officers at each rank in the Navy was fixed by Congress, so filling vacancies was difficult if the number of officers needed to man ships exceeded that fixed number of officers allowed by Congress. Acting appointments were also common with warrant officers and ratings, although they were subject to congressional approval and were simply temporary assignments. The regulations stated that in the United States, acting appointments were not allowed unless specifically authorized by the Department of the Navy. In most other cases, only the commander-in-chief of a fleet or squadron would be authorized to appoint an officer to fill a vacancy, and this order would be subject to approval of the Department of the Navy. In this way, the department was able to fill vacancies while the Navy grew before Congress took action to permanently increase the number of officers. Outside of the United States and not part of a fleet or squadron, the commanding officer of the ship was allowed to appoint officers to a higher rank in the case of death on board the ship.

The officer was temporarily appointed to the higher rank, appended "acting" to his new rank, wore the uniform of the higher rank, and was addressed and paid at the higher rank. When the ship returned to the United States or joined a fleet or squadron, the appointment was subject to review by the commander-in-chief of the fleet or squadron or the Department of the Navy.

Another type of temporary appointment was an "order to perform", which was issued in a similar manner to an acting appointment for lower-grade officers to perform the duties of a higher-grade officer, except that their pay, rank, and uniform remained at the lower grade.

Similar to the many brevet ranks in the Union Army, acting appointments were extremely common during the American Civil War. Congress authorized the Department of the Navy to purchase vessels and appoint acting or volunteer officers to man them until the end of the conflict. By the end of the war, most officers were appointed to a higher acting rank, and their appointments lasted until the end of the war, when many were discharged from the Navy.

== See also ==
- Frocking
- Battlefield promotion
- Rising from the ranks
