= John Horsford =

Major-General Sir John Horsford KCB (13 May 1751 – 20 April 1817) was a British soldier who rose through the ranks to become a general in the East India Company's Bengal Army.

== Biography ==
=== Early life ===
He was born at St George in the East, Middlesex, the son of John Horsford. He was educated at the Merchant Taylors' School, and matriculated at St. John's College, Oxford, 30 June 1768, and was a fellow from 1768 to 1771, but never took a degree.

=== India ===
In 1772, to avoid entering the church, and without the knowledge of his father, he enlisted for service with the East India Company under the assumed name of John Rover. He travelled to India on the East Indiaman, the Duke of Grafton. He spent his first six years in India in the ranks of the Bengal Artillery, until he caught the attention of its commander Colonel Pearse. It is recorded that one day Horsford pointed out an error in a Greek quotation in some papers he was copying for Pearse. It is said that Pearse suddenly called him by his right name as he was leaving the room and subsequently an order, dated Fort William, 9 March 1778, addressed to ‘Captain Watkin Thelwall, commanding No. 1 company, notifies that Sergeant John Rover, of the company under your command, is this day appointed a cadet of artillery in the Bengal Army under the name of "John Horsford."’

He was made a lieutenant-fireworker on 31 March 1778, and a first lieutenant in October that same year. In 1786 he was promoted to captain. During the Third Anglo-Mysore War, he commanded a company of Bengal artillery detached to Madras. He served at the Siege of Bangalore, Battle of Arakere, and Siege of Seringapatam. In March 1801, at Cawnpore, Horsford addressed a paper to Lord Lake setting forth the defects in organisation of the artillery branch and that same year was advanced to major. He commanded the artillery under Lord Lake during the Second Anglo-Maratha War in 1803–5, including the siege of Aligarh, the Battle of Delhi, and the sieges of Agra, Deeg and Bhurtpore. In 1804 he was made lieutenant-colonel. He commanded a brigade and also directed the artillery at the siege of Komanur, August–November 1807. On the resignation of Colonel Nicholas Carnegie in 1808 Horsford succeeded to the command of the Bengal artillery, of which he remained virtually the head until his death.

Horsford became a full colonel in July 1810. In June 1811 he was promoted to major-general. He was not engaged in the Anglo-Nepalese War but the artillery arrangements for those operations and for the grand army during the Third Anglo-Maratha War were directed by him. He was appointed Knight Commander of the Order of the Bath on 7 April 1815, and 28 June 1816 was appointed an extra major-general on the staff of the grand army. In June 1816 he addressed a memorial to the Marquis of Hastings, which showed that the lessons taught by the great continental wars in Europe had not escaped him. His high reputation secured attention to his representations, and although he did not live to see the results, the reorganisation of the Bengal artillery that followed in 1817–18 added largely to the efficiency of that famous corps. His last military operation was the direction of the artillery at the siege of Hathras in March 1817.

=== Death ===
He died at Cawnpore of heart disease, on 20 April, just ten days after his return from Hathras. He was 66 at the time of his death and had served in the military for 45 years, during which it is said he never had a day's leave from his duties. He was buried at the Christian cemetery in Cawnpore.

== Personal life ==
Whilst in India, Horsford entered into a long term relationship with an Indian women called Sahib Juan, with whom he had several children. His anxiety towards his daughters led him to condemn discrimination against "Eurasians" or "East Indians" as mixed-race individuals were referred to at the time. He published a number of poems defending such inter-racial relationships. He also lent support to James Kirkpatrick's Bengal Orphan Institute, and in a poem called the "Art of Living in India" he praised the biracial "auburn beauties" in the Howrah orphanage and encouraged young British men in India to marry them.

== Legacy ==
A historian of the Bengal artillery wrote of him:

"A sound constitution and strict temperance enabled him to endure what our modern nervous temperaments would shrink from. Intellectually, in scientific attainments and habits of order and system he stood confessedly unrivalled"

Along with Litellus Burrell, Horsford was a rare example of a man rising from the ranks to a high military position in the East India Company's army.
