= Edward Richardson (priest) =

Edward Shaw Richardson (1862 – 15 November 1921) was Archdeacon of Blackburn from 1920 to 1921.

He was educated at Rossall School and Trinity College, Cambridge and ordained in 1867. He began his ecclesiastical career with curacies in Poulton-le-Fylde, Corbridge, Kersal and Ancoats. He was then successively Rector of St Paul's, Hulme; Vicar of St Matthew's, Bolton; Rector of St George's, Hulme; and a Canon Residentiary of Manchesterbefore his Archdeacon’s appointment.

He died on 15 November 1921.

Church of England titles
Preceded by Willoughby Charles Allen	Archdeacon of Blackburn; 1920–1921	Succeeded by Atherton Gwillym Rawstorne
