= Desmond Carroll =

British Archdeacon (1938–2012)

Charles William Desmond Carroll (27 January 1919 – 14 February 2012) was the Archdeacon of Blackburn from 1983 to 1985.

Carroll was educated at St Columba's College, Dublin and Trinity College, Dublin. After an earlier career as a school teacher he was Vicar of Stanwix from 1950 to 1959; Director of Religious Education for the Diocese of Blackburn from 1959 to 1964; and a canon residentiary of Blackburn Cathedral from 1964 until his appointment as an archdeacon.

Church of England titles
Preceded by Henry Norman Hodd	Archdeacon of Blackburn; 1973–1986	Succeeded by William David Robinson
