= Francis Cramer-Roberts =

Anglican priest and bishop

Francis Alexander Randal Cranmer Cramer-Roberts (né Roberts; 3 December 1840 – 9 February 1901) was an Anglican priest and colonial bishop in the 19th century.

== Early life ==
Cramer-Roberts was born in Dublin in 1841, the son of Lieut-Col. John Cramer-Roberts and Marian Gall. His father was appointed Inspector-General of the Royal Irish Constabulary. He was educated at Rugby and Trinity College, Cambridge, where he graduated BA in 1864 and was ordained deacon by Ashurst Gilbert, Bishop of Chichester.

== Ecclesiastical career ==
In the following year, 1865, he was ordained priest and became Curate of Frant, Sussex. In 1868 he became Curate at Hawley, Kent, and in 1870 he was nominated to the Rectory of Llandinabo in Herefordshire. Three years later, he became Vicar of Blindley Heath, where he stayed until he in 1878 was appointed to the episcopate as Bishop of Nassau, serving for seven years. He was consecrated a bishop by Archibald Campbell Tait, Archbishop of Canterbury, on the Feast of the Nativity of Saint John the Baptist 1878 (24 June) at St Paul's Cathedral.

On his return to England in 1885 he became Vicar of Milford on Sea, and occasionally acted as assistant bishop to Harold Browne, Bishop of Winchester (see Assistant Bishop of Winchester). In 1887 he moved to Blackburn and became assistant bishop to James Moorhouse, Bishop of Manchester (see Assistant Bishop of Manchester). He was Proctor in Convocation for the clergy of the diocese from 1892, and finally Archdeacon of Blackburn 1900–1901.

Cramer-Roberts died on 9 February 1901.

Religious titles
Preceded by Addington Venables	Bishop of Nassau; 1878–1885	Succeeded by Edward Churton
Preceded by Robert Rawstorne	Archdeacon of Blackburn; 1900–1901	Succeeded by Robert Fletcher
