= David Robinson (priest) =

William David Robinson (15 March 1931 – 12 June 2003) was Archdeacon of Blackburn from 1986 to 1996.

He was educated at Queen Elizabeth's Grammar School, Blackburn and Durham University and ordained in 1958. Standish and Lancaster Priory. He was Vicar of St James, Blackburn from 1963 to 1973; and priest in charge of St James, Shireshead from 1973 to his appointment as an Archdeacon.

Church of England titles
Preceded by Charles William Desmond Carroll	Archdeacon of Blackburn; 1986–1996	Succeeded by Francis John Marsh
