= Litellus Burrell =

Litellus Burrell (1753 – 13 September 1827) was a British major-general in the East India Company's service.

== Biography ==
He was born in 1753, and entered the Bengal Army early in 1770 as a volunteer in Captain Rawstorne's company of the second battalion 2nd Bengal Europeans, in which he became a corporal in 1771, and sergeant in 1772. In 1774, on the recommendation of his captain, he was transferred to the 18th sepoys, with which he fought at the Battle of Cutra or St. George on 23 April 1774 and in the subsequent campaign in Rohilcund. He became sergeant-major of the corps in 1775, and remained with it until 1779, when he was nominated to a Bengal cadetship by Warren Hastings. In October of the same year he obtained a commission as ensign, and served against the Mahrattas with a detachment of sepoys under Captain Popham, distinguishing himself at the storming of Lotah and the capture of Gwalior by escalade. The 1st battalion of sepoy drafts, to which he belonged, became the 40th, and eventually the 33rd native infantry. When it was reduced at the peace, Burrell, who, as adjutant, had seen much rough service with it in Malwa under Colonels Camac and Muir, was appointed adjutant 2nd native infantry, with which he served until 1797. In that year, at his own request, he was transferred to the 3rd native infantry, then in the field in anticipation of an expected invasion by Zemaun Shah, king of Cabul.

He became brevet-captain in 1796, captain-lieutenant in 1797, and substantive captain in 1798, in which year he was transferred to the second battalion 5th native infantry at Lucknow. At this time the government called for three thousand sepoy volunteers from the Bengal infantry to proceed by sea to the coast of Coromandel to reinforce the Madras troops, and Burrell, who had come down the Ganges to Calcutta in charge of the volunteers of his regiment, was appointed to the command of the third battalion thus formed. The three battalions of Bengal volunteers proceeded to Madras, and joined General Harris's army, in which, as the 4th native brigade, under command of Colonel John Gardiner, they fought at Mallavelly and at the storming and capture of Seringapatam. They were next employed under Colonel Arthur Wellesley in subjugating the refractory chieftains of the Mysore, when the 3rd Bengal volunteers, under Burrell, garrisoned Chitteldroog. Subsequently, the volunteers were sent home overland, and on their arrival in their own presidency, after putting down some disturbances at Palavoram by the way, the supreme government notified in a general order 'its appreciation of the distinguished services of the European and native officers and soldiers of these gallant and meritorious corps during the late arduous crisis in public affairs.'

Meanwhile, Burrell had been appointed to the 15th native infantry, which had been added to the Bengal army in 1798. This corps he joined in Oude in 1801, and served with it in the campaign of 1803, under Lord Lake, at Delhi, Agra, and Laswarree, on which latter occasion he was in command of the advanced picquets of the army. With its battalions he likewise made the campaigns of 1804–5, and fought at Deeg, and in the desperate but unsuccessful attempts on Bhurtpore, in which his health suffered severely from the privations endured. In 1807 he became lieutenant-colonel of the 1st battalion, and in November of the year following 'standards of honour,’ inscribed among other devices with the name 'Lake,’ similar to those awarded to other native corps which had served through Lord Lake's campaigns, were presented to the 15th native infantry, under command of Burrell, at Barrackpore by Lord Minto, the governor-general, in person.

Burrell became brevet-colonel in 1814, and in 1817 was appointed to the command of the 3rd brigade of the grand army under Lord Hastings, then in the field against the Pindarrees. At the end of the campaign he rejoined his regiment, and was appointed to the command-in-chief of all the East India Company's forces in the territory of the Nawab Vizier of Oude. In 1819 he succeeded to a regiment on the Bengal establishment, and in 1821 was promoted to the rank of major-general on the occasion of the coronation of George IV. He remained in Oude until 1820, when severe illness sent him down to the presidency. Having benefited by the change, he was appointed to a command at Cuttack in 1821. Failing health, however, compelled him to relinquish further employment and to seek his native climate. He died at Notting Hill on 13 September 1827, aged 75.

Of a placid disposition, kindly, even-tempered, and possessed of an intimate acquaintance with the habits, feelings, and prejudices of the natives, Burrell had the gift of winning the confidence and esteem of all with whom he came in contact. Under his rule, his regiment is said to have been a model of good order in the field and in cantonments, and whenever volunteers were called for, as in the cases of the expeditions to Mauritius and Java and the proposed occupation of Macao, the 15th native infantry was always ready with double or treble its quota.
