= Robert Fletcher (priest) =

Robert Crompton Fletcher, MA (9 December 1850 – 27 February 1917) was Archdeacon of Blackburn from 1901 to 1916.

He was born in Fremantle, Western Australia and educated at Heath Grammar School, Halifax where he was admitted in 1861, and at Rossall School and Sidney Sussex College, Cambridge and ordained in 1874. He was an Assistant Master at King William's College, Isle of Man then Curate of Tarleton. He became the Rector and Vicar of that parish in 1875 and was in post until 1908. From then he was Rector of Chorley.

He married firstly Nina Rawcliffe in 1878, with whom he had eight children; and in 1909 Jessie Tyas née Knowles. He was an Alderman of Lancashire County Council from 1889; and Surrogate of the Diocese of Manchester from 1888.

On his death he was buried in the churchyard of St Mary, Tarleton.

== Arms ==
Coat of arms of Robert Fletcher
Notes Confirmed by Sir Arthur Vicars, Ulster King of Arms, 10 March 1903. Crest On a wreath of the colours a demi-talbot rampant Azure ducally gorged and pierced by two arrows in saltire Or. Escutcheon Sable a cross florettee engrailed between four escallops Argent. Motto Dominus Non Sagitta Tatamen

Church of England titles
Preceded by Francis Alexander Randal Cramer-Roberts	Archdeacon of Blackburn; 1901–1916	Succeeded by Willoughby Charles Allen
