= Edward Birch =

Edward Birch (17 May 1809 – 9 August 1886) was the inaugural Archdeacon of Blackburn.

He was educated at Eton and St John's College, Cambridge. He was ordained in 1832 and began his career as a curate at All Saints, Manchester. He was Rector of St Saviour, Manchester from 1836 to 1868 when he was appointed Vicar of Blackburn. He was also Rural Dean of Blackburn from then until his Archdeacon’s appointment.

Church of England titles
Preceded by Inaugural appointment	Archdeacon of Blackburn; 1877–1885	Succeeded by Robert Atherstone Rawstorne
