= Willoughby Allen =

British Archdeacon

Willoughby Charles Allen (7 October 1867 – 10 February 1953) was an Anglican priest in the early 20th century.

He was educated at the Clergy Orphan School in Canterbury and Exeter College, Oxford. He was ordained in 1894 and began his ecclesiastical career as a curate in South Hinksey. He was a Fellow of His old college until 1908 when he became Principal of Egerton Hall, Manchester. He was Archdeacon of Manchester from 1909 to 1916; Archdeacon of Blackburn from 1916 to 1920; and Rector of Saham Toney from 1922 to 1932.

Church of England titles
Preceded by John Charles Wright	Archdeacon of Manchester; 1909–1916	Succeeded by Noel Lake Aspinall
Preceded by Robert Crompton Fletcher	Archdeacon of Blackburn; 1916–1920	Succeeded by Edward Shaw Richardson
