= John Marsh (priest) =

British Anglican clergyman (born 1947)

Francis John Marsh (born 3 July 1947) is a British Anglican clergyman. He was Archdeacon of Blackburn in the Church of England from 1996 until 2001.

== Biography ==
He was educated at the University of York and ordained in 1976 After curacies at St Matthew's, Cambridge and Christ Church, Pitsmoor he was the Director of Pastoral Training for the Diocese of Sheffield. His last post before his Archdeacon's appointment was Vicar of Christ Church, Wakefield.

In 2011, Marsh returned to ministry after a ten-year break. He is Priest in Charge of St Michael the Archangel, Emley and St James the Great, Flockton in the Anglican Diocese of Leeds. He is also an honorary Diocesan Training Officer.

=== Abuse allegations ===
In May 2001, it was announced that Marsh had been arrested in relation to child pornography. His computer had been taken into a computer shop for repairs: the staff contacted the police claiming they had "discovered evidence of visits to child pornography sites on the computer's hard drive". He was released on bail and suspended from his ministries by the Church. In October 2001, he was cleared of the allegations but still resigned as archdeacon.

Church of England titles
| Preceded by William David Robinson | Archdeacon of Blackburn; 1996–2001 | Succeeded by John Andrew Hawley |
