= Rising from the ranks =

Enlisted soldiers being commissioned as officers

Rising from the ranks, through the ranks or commissioned from the ranks refers to enlisted soldiers being commissioned as officers. In class-conscious societies of the past, such as Britain during the Victorian era, for example, this was a relatively rare occurrence.

== Revolutionary and Napoleonic France ==
Despite the nickname "the little corporal", Napoleon did not rise from the ranks. (He was commissioned a second lieutenant after graduating from military school.) However, he did famously state, "Tout soldat français porte dans sa giberne le bâton de maréchal de France." ("Every French soldier carries the baton of a marshal of France in his knapsack.") That is, any soldier could attain such a lofty rank. And indeed, many seized the opportunities opened to them by the French Revolution and the Napoleonic Wars to serve as such under his command, including:

- Jean Bernadotte, later king of Sweden
- Jean-Baptiste Bessières
- Jean Lannes
- François Joseph Lefebvre
- André Masséna
- Michel Ney
- Nicolas Oudinot
- Claude-Victor Perrin
- Jean-de-Dieu Soult

== Post-Napoleonic France ==
François Achille Bazaine (1811–1888), over the course of four decades of service, rose from private to Marshal of France in 1863.

== United Kingdom ==
An 1857 report stated the following numbers of non-commissioned officers received commissions in the British Army:

- 23 for 1853–4
- 101 for 1854–5
- 100 for 1855–6
- 147 for 1856–7

British soldiers promoted from the ranks during the two World Wars were sometimes known as temporary gentlemen.

Generals	Enlisted	Rank attained	Date attained	Notes
John Horsford (1751–1817)	1772, East India Company	Major general	June 1811	Major-general in the East India Company's Bengal Army.
Sir John Elley (1764–1839)	1789, Royal Regiment of Horse Guards	Major general	August 1819	Fought in the Napoleonic Wars.
Sir John Elley (1764–1839)	1789, Royal Regiment of Horse Guards	Lieutenant general	10 January 1837	Fought in the Napoleonic Wars.
Sir William Robertson, 1st Baronet (1860–1933)	1877, trooper, 16th (The Queen's) Lancers	Brigadier	29 November 1907	Chief of the Imperial General Staff (CIGS) (1916-1918). Only soldier in the history of the British Army to rise from an enlisted rank to its highest rank.
Sir William Robertson, 1st Baronet (1860–1933)	1877, trooper, 16th (The Queen's) Lancers	Major general	26 December 1910	Chief of the Imperial General Staff (CIGS) (1916-1918). Only soldier in the history of the British Army to rise from an enlisted rank to its highest rank.
Sir William Robertson, 1st Baronet (1860–1933)	1877, trooper, 16th (The Queen's) Lancers	Lieutenant general	13 September 1914	Chief of the Imperial General Staff (CIGS) (1916-1918). Only soldier in the history of the British Army to rise from an enlisted rank to its highest rank.
Sir William Robertson, 1st Baronet (1860–1933)	1877, trooper, 16th (The Queen's) Lancers	General	23 December 1915	Chief of the Imperial General Staff (CIGS) (1916-1918). Only soldier in the history of the British Army to rise from an enlisted rank to its highest rank.
Sir William Robertson, 1st Baronet (1860–1933)	1877, trooper, 16th (The Queen's) Lancers	Field marshal	29 March 1920	Chief of the Imperial General Staff (CIGS) (1916-1918). Only soldier in the history of the British Army to rise from an enlisted rank to its highest rank.
Hector MacDonald (1853–1903)	1870, Inverness-shire Highland Rifle Volunteers	Brigadier	October 1899	
Hector MacDonald (1853–1903)	1870, Inverness-shire Highland Rifle Volunteers	Major general	26 March 1902	
Sir Fitzroy Maclean, 1st Baronet (1911–1996)	1939, Queen's Own Cameron Highlanders	Brigadier	11 April 1944	Rose to the rank of brigadier during the Second World War.
Sir Fitzroy Maclean, 1st Baronet (1911–1996)	1939, Queen's Own Cameron Highlanders	Major general	16 June 1947	Rose to the rank of brigadier during the Second World War.
Enoch Powell (1912–1998)	1939, Royal Warwickshire Regiment	Brigadier	3 May 1945	Rose to the rank of brigadier during the Second World War.

== United States ==
"Mustang" is American military slang for soldiers who rise from the ranks. Notable mustangs include:

- Nathan Bedford Forrest (1821–1877). The famed cavalry leader started as a private in the Confederate States Army and rose to lieutenant general.
- William McKinley (1843–1901). The future president of the United States enlisted as a private in the Union Army in 1861 and received a battlefield commission. His highest rank was brevet major.
- Galusha Pennypacker (1841/1844–1916). Initially an American Civil War quartermaster sergeant in 1861, he was promoted to major general in 1865.
- Winfield Scott (1786–1865). He enlisted in 1807 as a militia cavalry corporal, and was eventually promoted to major general and brevet lieutenant general.
- Chuck Yeager (1923–2020). Yeager enlisted in the United States Army Air Forces as a private in 1941 and rose to brigadier general.

== Fiction ==
In military fiction, this is a not uncommon trope, Richard Sharpe being a prime example.

In Robert Heinlein's Starship Troopers, the main character Juan "Johnny" Rico enlists in the Mobile Infantry as a private, and later receives a direct appointment to lieutenant.

== See also ==
- Military rank
- Promotion (rank)
- Battlefield promotion
- Acting rank
- Brevet (military)
