= Arnold Picton =

Arnold Stanley Picton (28 June 1899 – 8 June 1962) was the Archdeacon of Blackburn from 1959 until his death.

He was educated at King's College London, Christ Church, Oxford and Ripon College Cuddesdon and ordained in 1918. After curacies in Warrington and Millom he held incumbencies in Barrow-in-Furness and Preston before his archdeacon's appointment.

Church of England titles
Preceded by Charles Lambert	Archdeacon of Blackburn; 1959–1962	Succeeded by Norman Hodd
