= Brevet =

Military rank title as a reward or courtesy

In military terminology, a brevet (/brəˈvɛt/ or /ˈbrɛvɪt/) is a warrant which gives commissioned officers a higher military rank as a reward without necessarily conferring the authority and privileges granted by that rank. The promotion would be noted in the officer's title (for example, "Bvt. Maj. Gen. Joshua L. Chamberlain" or "Bvt. Col. Arthur MacArthur"). It is not a Brevet d'état-major in Francophone European military circles, where it is an award, nor is it a temporary commission.

== France ==
In France, brevet is a word with a very broad meaning, which includes every document giving a capacity to a person. For instance, the various military speciality courses, such as military parachutism, are ended by the award of a brevet.

The more important brevet in the French military is that of the École de guerre (lit. "school of war"), the French Staff College. Between 1870 and 1940, an officier breveté was a graduate of the École supérieure de guerre. Nowadays, while many officers still attend the école de guerre, they do not use the term officier breveté.

The French military does not use brevets to give officers a higher standing, employing temporary commissions instead. As an example, Charles de Gaulle was promoted "provisional brigadier general" (général de brigade à titre provisoire) in 1940 when he was commander of an armoured division.

== Germany ==
In the Prussian and German army and navy, it was possible to bestow a Charakter rank on officers that was in many respects similar to a brevet rank. For example, an Oberst could receive the Charakter als Generalmajor. Very often, German officers would be promoted to the next higher Charakter rank on the day of their retirement.

== Spain ==
It was not uncommon during the 19th century to distinguish between empleo ("employed"), the permanent rank and graduación ("grade") the honorary, brevet rank. In the 1884 rank regulations (which with minor modifications were in force during the Spanish–American War), stars marked the rank whilst the actual post was reflected in gold lace on the cuffs.

As in practice both situations coincided, the system was dropped in 1908 leaving only the starred system of denoting rank. Nevertheless, during the Spanish Civil War of 1936–39 the system was revived on the Nationalist side due to the lack of trained officers because of the enlargement of the army. The breveted officers (known as habilitados or estampillados) wore their actual rank on the cuffs but their brevetted one in a rectangular black patch on the left breast of their coats or shirts.

== United Kingdom ==
In the United Kingdom the brevet commission was only by courtesy. Officially, both titles were used, as: "Major and Brevet Lieutenant Colonel Cornwallis". Originally the term designated a promotion given on such occasions as a coronation, or the termination of a great war, and had its origin during the reign of King James II (1685–1688); but it was abused so frequently and used to such an extent by the general award of brevet commissions that from 1854, during the Crimean War of 1853–1856 and subsequently, its bestowal was limited by the government strictly to cases of very distinguished service in the field and on the principle of seniority. The British Army confined brevet commissions to ranks from captain to lieutenant-colonel.

The brevet conferred rank in the British Army overall, but importantly, not in the regiment. Advancement in the regiment could take place generally only by purchase until 1871 or by seniority, with the exception of the Royal Regiment of Artillery and the Royal Engineers where it has never been possible to buy commissions and promotion was based on merit, and when there was a suitable vacancy caused by the death, retirement or promotion of a more senior officer. For an officer on duty with his regiment, only regimental rank counted. If the regiment formed part of a larger formation then brevet rank could be used to determine command of temporary units formed for special purposes.

In particular brigadier did not become a permanent rank until 1947, so command of brigades was determined by seniority, including by the date of promotion to any brevet rank. Thus it was possible for a regimental major to hold a brevet lieutenant-colonelcy with seniority over the commission of his own commanding officer as lieutenant-colonel and be given command of a brigade, potentially including his own regiment. Similarly, while the officer served in a staff position or as an aide-de-camp, then he could use his brevet rank. Appointment to a brevet also counted towards the requirement to have served for a sufficient time in a lower rank to be eligible for promotion (by purchase) to a more senior one.

== United States ==
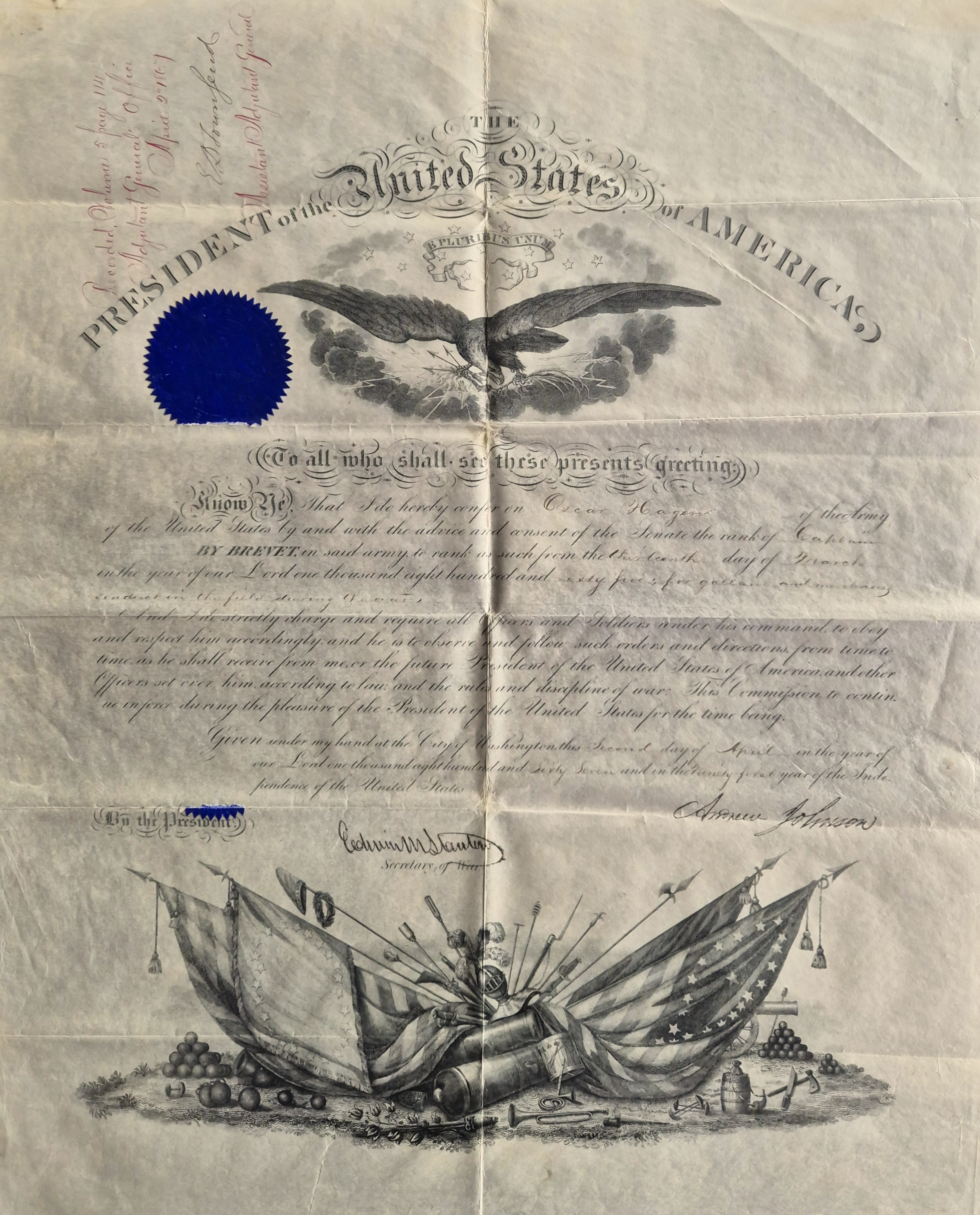
Brevet document of President Andrew Johnson, issued 2. April 1867

The Articles of War adopted by the United States Army in 1776 and slightly revised in 1806 established the use and significance of brevet ranks or awards in the U.S. Army. When first used, a brevet commission in the U.S. Army entitled the officer to be identified by a higher rank, but the award had limited effect on the right to higher command or pay. A brevet rank had no effect within the officer's current unit. When assigned duty at the brevet rank by the U.S. President, such an officer would command with the brevet rank and be paid at the higher rank.

This higher command and pay would last only for the duration of that assignment. The brevet promotion would not affect the officer's seniority and actual permanent rank in the army. Beginning on April 16, 1818, brevet commissions also required confirmation by the United States Senate, just as all other varieties of officer commissions did.

=== Early use ===
Brevets were first used in the U.S. Army during the American Revolutionary War. Often, the nation's Continental Congress could not find suitable positions for foreign officers—mostly from France—who sought commissions. The first U.S. brevet was given to Jacques Antoine de Franchessin on July 20, 1776, allowing him to hold the rank of lieutenant colonel within the Continental Army. Franchessin and another 35 men of foreign birth would hold brevet commissions in the Army by the end of the war. By 1784, an additional 50 officers would receive brevets for "meritorious services" during the conflict.

In the 19th-century U.S. Army, brevet promotions were quite common because the Army had many frontier forts to garrison and other missions to perform but could not always appoint appropriately ranked officers to command these forts or missions. The U.S. Congress permitted only a limited number of officers of each rank. Thus, an officer of lower rank might receive a brevet commission to a rank more appropriate for his assignment. Also, newly commissioned officers often received brevet rank until authorized positions became available.

For example, an officer might graduate from West Point and be appointed a brevet second lieutenant until a permanent second lieutenant posting opened up. In early 1861, some recent graduates of West Point temporarily were named brevet second lieutenants because not enough Regular Army officer vacancies were available to give them commissions as regular second lieutenants. In addition to officers being appointed to a brevet rank to temporarily serve in positions designated for higher-ranked officers (i.e., in lieu of promotion to permanent rank), officers might be awarded brevet rank as recognition for gallantry or meritorious service.

=== American Civil War ===
During the American Civil War, almost all senior Union officers received some form of brevet award, mainly during the final months of the war. But these awards were made for gallantry or meritorious service, rather than for command. In addition to the authorization in a previous law for awards of brevet ranks to Regular Army officers, an act of Congress of March 3, 1863, authorized the award of brevet rank to officers of the United States Volunteers. Thus, brevet awards became increasingly common later in the war.

Some officers even received more than one award. Because of the existence of both Regular Army and United States Volunteers ranks, and the possibility that an officer could hold actual and brevet ranks in both services, some general and other officers could hold as many as four different ranks simultaneously. For example, by the end of the war, Ranald S. Mackenzie was a brevet major general of volunteers, an actual, full-rank brigadier general of volunteers, a brevet brigadier general in the United States Regular Army, and an actual Regular Army captain.

Brevet rank in the Union Army, whether in the Regular Army or the United States Volunteers, during and at the conclusion of the American Civil War, may be regarded as an honorary title which conferred none of the authority, precedence, nor pay of real or full rank. The vast majority of the Union Army brevet ranks were awarded posthumously or on or as of March 13, 1865, as the war was coming to a close. U.S. Army regulations concerning brevet rank provided that brevet rank could be claimed "in courts-martial and on detachments, when composed of different corps" and when the officer served with provisional formations made up of different regiments or companies, or "on other occasions". These regulations were vague enough to support the positions of some brevet generals who caused controversies by claiming supposed priorities or privileges of brevet ranks that had been awarded to them at earlier dates during the war.

Some full-rank brigadier generals in the United States Volunteers (USV) in the American Civil War had been awarded brevet brigadier general rank in the USV before receiving full-rank promotions to brigadier general of United States Volunteers. Some full-rank brigadier generals in the USV were awarded the rank of brevet major general in the USV, but were not promoted to full-rank major generals in the USV. Some United States Regular Army officers who served with the USV in ranks below general officer were awarded brevet general officer rank in the USV, but were not promoted to full-rank general officers in the USV.

On the other hand, at least a few USV general officers also were awarded brevet general officer rank in the Regular Army in addition to their full-rank appointments or brevet general officer awards in the United States Volunteers. Many of the Regular Army officers of lower rank who became full-rank USV generals, however, received neither actual promotions to a general officer rank nor brevet general officer awards in the Regular Army in addition to their USV ranks or awards. Some of them who stayed in the United States Regular Army after the war did achieve general officer rank in later years.

In addition to the brevet awards to current (or future) full-rank United States Volunteers (USV) generals during the American Civil War, 1,367 other USV officers of lower ranks were awarded the rank of brevet brigadier general, brevet major general, or both, in the United States Volunteers, but not promoted to full-rank USV generals. At least one enlisted man, Private Frederick W. Stowe, was brevetted as a second lieutenant in the Union Army during the Civil War.

The Confederate States of America had legislation and regulations for the use of brevets in their armed forces, provided by Article 61 of the nation's Articles of War, and by their 1861 Army Regulations, which were based on the U.S. Army's 1857 version of their regulations. Stephen Dodson Ramseur assumed command of Jubal A. Early's division when that general took over from Ewell after Spotsylvania. He received a temporary promotion to major general on June 1, 1864, becoming at 27 the youngest West Point graduate to ever be promoted to major general in the Confederate Army.

The United States Marine Corps also issued brevets. After officers became eligible for the Medal of Honor, a rare Marine Corps Brevet Medal was issued to living officers who had been brevetted between 1861 and 1915.

=== Modern usage ===
The practice of brevetting disappeared from the (regular) U.S. military at the end of the 19th century; honors were bestowed instead with a series of medals. Brevetting was declared obsolete in 1922. However, the similar practice of frocking continues in four of the six branches of the U.S. armed forces. The U.S. Air Force does not allow the regular practice of frocking before a promotion date, except in rare circumstances, such as when an officer selected for promotion is assigned to a billet (typically a senior joint duty assignment) that requires them to hold/wear the higher rank to which they are expected to be promoted. Frocking typically requires special approval to be obtained from the service headquarters.

The services differ in how they deal with officers who have been selected for promotion, but not yet promoted, as happens with a promotion list. An Army lieutenant colonel who has been selected for promotion to colonel uses lieutenant colonel (promotable), while in the Air Force, that officer would use colonel (select).

The promotion of an enlisted person or non-commissioned officer to commissioned officer rank as a reward for displaying leadership and bravery is referred to as a direct appointment rather than a brevet. It temporarily grants up to the rank of first lieutenant. The holder must then attend Officer Candidate School in order to keep the commission. They must also have or acquire a four-year college degree if they wish to be promoted to the rank of captain or above.

Prior to the suspension of the draft in 1973, the US Army also utilized the administrative distinction between the Regular Army and the Army of the United States as a mechanism for rapid, temporary promotion of officers. An officer's rank in the Regular Army was their "permanent rank", with a "theater rank" in the much larger, conscripted Army of the United States.

The U.S. National Guard, which depends on the governor of a state to concede its commissions in the Army National Guard and Air National Guard, may still confer brevets. Many states maintain a clause permitting the governor to confer any rank in its defense forces, including the militia and National Guards. Some states provide that the sitting governor may confer any rank, but this appointment is considered valid only for the duration of the governor's own term in office.

Some states also confer brevets as part of their regular honors system. Georgia confers honorary ranks into its state police force. Kentucky is famous for its colonels, and so too is Tennessee, both of which make the appointment as an honorary member of the governor's staff. Alabama, Kentucky, Texas, and Nebraska also confer flag officer ranks within a symbolic navy. Similar honors have been issued for the Georgia Naval Militia, which has existed only on paper since 1908. In all cases these honorary titles may be considered effective brevets, equal to that of the National Guard, by being conferred by a sitting governor.

The 2019 John S. McCain National Defense Authorization Act (NDAA) provided the Army with 770 brevet positions. The U.S. Army brevet promotion program selects officers for temporary promotion to serve at the next higher rank in a critical billet. A brevet promotion entitles an officer to be temporarily promoted to the next grade and to avail of the pay and benefits of the higher rank. This program is one of the nine new authorities that provide the Army flexibility to determine the characteristics of a talent management system.

== See also ==
- Acting rank
- Tombstone promotion
- Battlefield promotion
- Rising from the ranks
