= Norman Hodd =

Henry Norman Hodd (8 May 1905 – 25 April 1973) was the Archdeacon of Blackburn from 1962 until his death.

He was educated at St Peter's School, York and Keble College, Oxford. He began his ecclesiastical career as a Curate at Leeds Parish Church. After this he was Senior Curate at Christ Church, Harrogate from 1932 to 1935; Vicar of the University Church, Leeds, 1935 to 1942; Chaplain to the Forces 1942 to 1945; Vicar and Rural Dean of Retford from 1945 to 1951; Vicar of Mansfield from 1951 to 1959; and Adviser on Christian Stewardship to the Church of England from 1959 to 1962 before his Archdeacon’s appointment.

Church of England titles
Preceded by Arnold Stanley Picton	Archdeacon of Blackburn; 1962–1973	Succeeded by Desmond Frederick Carroll
