= Frocking =

United States military term

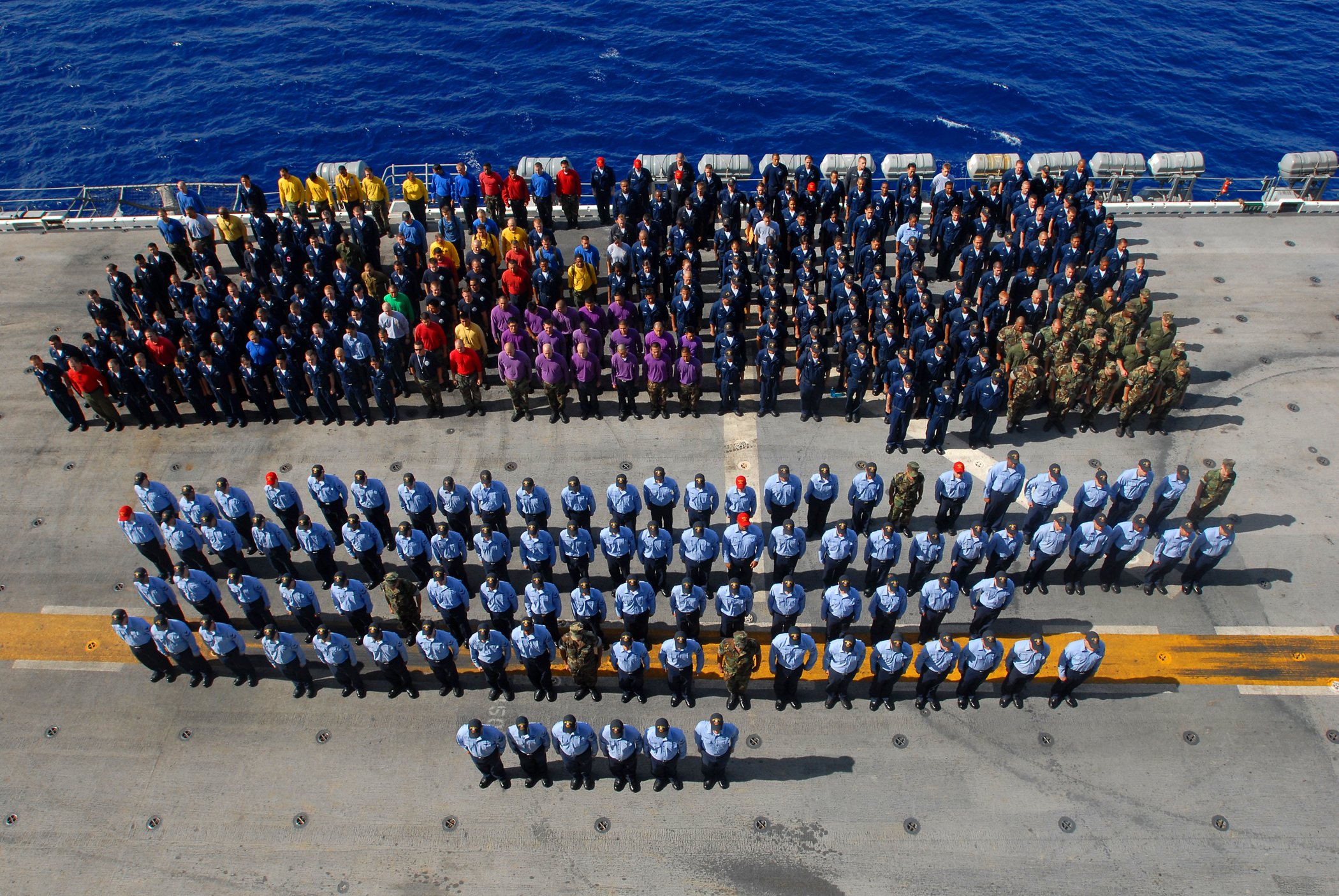
A frocking ceremony on board the USS Peleliu

In the United States military, frocking is the practice of a commissioned or non-commissioned officer selected for promotion wearing the insignia of the higher grade before the official date of promotion (the "date of rank"). An officer who has been selected for promotion may be authorized to "frock" to the next grade.

The need to frock is a result of the fact that, for some ranks, the number of people who may serve in them is restricted by federal law. Thus, even though an individual may have been selected for promotion and, for officers, confirmed by the Senate, they must often wait for a vacancy (headroom) to occur in order to be officially promoted.

Frocking customs and policies vary across military services, particularly for enlisted members. In the United States Army a general officer may request authority to frock soldiers of his command. In the United States Air Force, only senior field grade and general officers are usually frocked. The United States Navy makes use of frocking much more frequently than do the Army and the Air Force. An example of this is when all new chief petty officers of the United States Navy are frocked on 16 September of each year, although their official date of rank will be at different times over the next year.

== History ==
The term frocking dates back to the Age of Sail, when communications between the Department of the Navy and ships at sea could take months. News of the promotion of an officer arrived, usually via letters brought by another ship, and often with orders for the newly promoted officer to report to a new ship or station. The ship that brought the news would often take that officer away to his new post. Since the departing officer created a vacancy on the first ship, the captain would often forward a recommendation for promotion for one of the remaining officers, which was to be carried back to the Department of the Navy.

Since one of the symbols of rank was a frock coat, the newly promoted officer would pass his old frock coat to the officer remaining behind and recommended for promotion. Months could go by until the captain's recommendation made it back to the Department of the Navy, was acted upon, made official, and news sent back. In the intervening time, the officer recommended for promotion would be accorded the privileges and authorities of his "new" rank, but would not receive the pay for it, since it was not yet official. Because it was not yet official, and because he was still wearing the old frock coat of the recently departed and (officially) promoted officer, the officer recommended for promotion was considered "frocked".

According to current Department of Defense policy, there is no limit to the number of two-, three-, and four-star generals (or admirals) who may be frocked at any one time. However, the number of frocked brigadier generals or rear admirals (lower half) is restricted. Three- and four-star generals are generally frocked if headroom is not available to promote them at the time of the assumption of their new assignment. This is due both to the close relationship between these ranks and the position held, and to the fact that these are considered "positions of importance and responsibility" in accordance with 10 USC § 601. For all other officers frocking is normally reserved for joint, international, or other high-visibility positions that require the higher rank for diplomatic, protocol, or command authority reasons.

== Restrictions ==
=== Army and Navy ===
1. An officer must be on an approved and confirmed promotion list.
2. An officer must not be under a suspension of favorable personnel actions.
3. Authority to wear the grade of rank to which frocked will not be recorded in official orders.
4. A frocked officer is not entitled to the pay and allowances commensurate with the grade of rank to which frocked.
5. A frocked officer does not accrue seniority for future promotion consideration.
6. Frocked time does not count as time-in-grade in the grade of rank to which frocked, for retirement purposes.
7. If an officer dies or is injured while in a frocked status, compensation will be based upon the officer's actual grade without regard to the grade or rank to which the officer was frocked.
8. Functions which by law or DoD directive must be performed by an officer who actually holds a particular grade or rank (such as UCMJ actions or signing substantive legal documents) may not be performed by an officer frocked to that grade or rank. However, functions which by regulation require performance by an officer of a particular grade or rank may be performed by an officer frocked to that grade or rank, if specifically permitted by the regulation concerned.
9. An officer may continue to wear the rank to which frocked upon a change of duty or permanent change of station (PCS) unless removed from the promotion list.

=== Air Force ===
Frocking occurs on rare occasions when officers are selected for promotion to a higher rank, but have yet to reach the effective date of promotion. For frocking to occur in the Air Force, an unusual set of circumstances must be present to justify wearing the higher rank before the promotion becomes effective. For example, in 2005, two U.S. Air Force lieutenant colonels selected for promotion to colonel were brevetted (frocked) colonel about six months ahead of their effective dates of promotion because of the high-profile nature of the duties that they were performing.

== Benefits ==
A frocked officer may:

1. wear the insignia and uniform of the higher rank.
2. use the higher rank when signing officer and enlisted evaluation forms, awards and decorations, and documents dealing with protocol, such as military etiquette and precedence.
3. accept general officer housing if assigned based on position, not rank.
4. accrue all the privileges afforded by custom or regulation to this rank.
5. obtain ceremonial (and command) flags.
6. obtain and use protocol ("flag") stationery.
7. obtain parking stickers for the frocked rank.
8. update ID card, official photo and biography reflecting the higher grade.

== See also ==
- Acting (rank)
- Brevet (military)
