= Rawsthorne =

Rawsthorne or Rawsthorn is a surname. Notable people with the surname include:

- Alan Rawsthorne (1905–1971), English composer
- Alice Rawsthorn (b. 1958), English journalist
- John Rawsthorne (b. 1936), English Catholic bishop
- Isabel Rawsthorne (1912–1992), British painter
- Noel Rawsthorne (1929–2019), English organist and composer
