= John Hawley (priest) =

John Andrew Hawley (born 27 April 1950) was the Archdeacon of Blackburn from 2002 until 2015.

He was educated at Ecclesfield Grammar School and King's College London, trained at Wycliffe Hall, Oxford and was ordained in 1976 After curacies in Hull and Bradford he was Vicar of All Saints, Doncaster then Team Rector of Dewsbury until his appointment as Archdeacon of Blackburn.

Church of England titles
| Preceded by John Marsh | Archdeacon of Blackburn; 2002–2015 | Incumbent |
