= Battlefield promotion =

Advancement in military rank that occurs while deployed in combat

A battlefield promotion (or field promotion) is an advancement in military rank that occurs while deployed in combat. A standard field promotion is advancement from current rank to the next higher rank; a "jump-step" promotion allows the recipient to advance by two ranks.

A battlefield commission is a commission granting an enlisted soldier a battlefield promotion to the rank of commissioned officer. The granting of a battlefield commission has its historical precursor in the medieval practice of the knighting or ennoblement of a plebeian combatant on the battleground for demonstration of heroic qualities in an exceptional degree. In the medieval context, this martial achievement was often one of the main restricted pathways into the sword-bearing feudal aristocracy.

== United Kingdom ==
The last person to receive a battlefield promotion in the United Kingdom was Rifleman Gigar Das. Das was given a field promotion to lance corporal in 2014 after serving eight years in the 1st Battalion The Rifles. Das had been deployed on three tours in Afghanistan and one in Iraq. Das was promoted after Chief of the General Staff General Sir Peter Wall witnessed him giving a training session in marksmanship principles. General Wall was astonished that Das was still only a Rifleman, a rank equivalent to a private. He immediately promoted Das after consulting his company commander, Major Sam Cates. The Ministry of Defence confirmed the last previous field promotion was believed to have happened during the Korean War (1950–1953).

During the Burma campaign in March 1944, Havildar (Sergeant) Kulbahadur Gurung of the 3rd Battalion, The 6th Queen Elizabeth's Own Gurkha Rifles was commissioned at the rank of captain in the field for an action wherein he personally killed several enemy Japanese combatants.

== United States ==
A battlefield promotion is awarded to enlisted soldiers who are promoted to a higher enlisted rank during combat or combat conditions. The US Army discontinued this practice after the Vietnam War with the centralized promotion system, but in 2009 decided to again allow such promotions. "Battlefield promotions are predicated on extraordinary performance of duties while serving in combat or under combat conditions." It can be used to promote an individual soldier one grade, to at most staff sergeant, and has a variety of constraints. This promotion does not involve a promotion board and does not require the soldier meet time in service or time in grade requirements. Soldiers given a field promotion from corporal to sergeant must complete the Basic Leader Course or BLC. A sergeant field promoted to staff sergeant must complete the Advanced Leader Course (ALC). In either case, to retain their promotion they must complete the BLC or ALC within 270 days after redeployment to a home station. Extensions can be applied for but failure to complete the required courses will result in an administrative reduction in rank.

Normally, enlisted service members or non-commissioned officers cannot attain commissioned officer rank through regular promotion. Starting in 1917, during World War I, the United States Army started awarding battlefield commissions to soldiers to replace the "Brevet Officer" system (the promotion of an enlisted man to a commissioned officer without an increase in pay). The Marine Corps started awarding battlefield commissions in place of the Brevet Medal, which was second only to the Medal of Honor. From World War I to the Vietnam War, over 31,200 sailors, soldiers, marines, and airmen have been awarded battlefield commissions. Such a commission is usually advancement from non-commissioned officer to commissioned officer, generally O-1 - second lieutenant, or ensign in the Navy and Coast Guard. The most significant aspect of a battlefield commission is that it is granted apart from the regular commission sources: Officer Training School/Officer Candidate School, Reserve Officer Training Corps or a service academy. Battlefield commissions are awarded on the basis of merit and demonstration of leadership, and bypass this step. The most notable recipient of a battlefield commission was Audie Murphy, who was promoted from staff sergeant to second lieutenant during World War II. Once on a peacetime footing, battlefield-commissioned officers are required to meet the normal requirements within a time frame in order to be retained (e.g., a bachelor's degree).

=== History ===
From 1845 through 1918, enlisted men who were commissioned for outstanding leadership on the field of battle were referred to as Brevet Officers. The Marine Corps recognized the value of combat leaders who were commissioned in this manner and created a Brevet Medal which was second only to the Medal of Honor. In the wars following 1918, enlisted men and warrant officers, commissioned for the same reason, were referred to as battlefield commissioned.

- World War I — From 1917 to 1918, approximately 6,000 non-commissioned officers were awarded battlefield commissions.
- World War II — From 1941 to 1945, approximately 25,500 men were awarded battlefield commissions worldwide. The United States Marine Corps also awarded battlefield commissions during the same period but no records were kept of the total. At the conclusion of World War II a board of officers reporting to the Commanding General of the European Theater stated, "The one sure method of determining whether any individual has qualities which make him a successful leader in combat is to observe that man in combat." Battlefield commissions were approved by the War Department.
- Korean War — From 1950 to 1953, a system parallel to that of World War II was adopted. The Department of Defense cannot provide figures on the number promoted. The Marine Corps did not award battlefield commissions during the war.
- Vietnam War — From 1963 to 1973, the Marine Corps Commandant appointed a permanent board with the mission of selecting those enlisted men of the Marine Corps whose performance under fire while serving in Vietnam merited a commission. A list of 62 enlisted men who were commissioned includes one man who was killed before he could accept his.
- Operation Iraqi Freedom; From 2003 to 2011, the United States Army appointed the first female to a battlefield commission from soldier to officer, Michelle (Miller) Cherland.
- The US Army has current regulations allowing battlefield commissions for Operation Enduring Freedom (technically "Battlefield Appointments")

== India ==
Lieutenant Vikram Batra was given a field promotion to captain in 1999, during the Kargil War (Operation Vijay). During the war, the task of capturing Point 5140 was assigned to the "13 JAK RIF" under the command of (then) Lt. Col. Yogesh Kumar Joshi. On 27 June 1999, after the capture of Point 5140, Lt. Batra was promoted to the rank of captain. General Ved Prakash Malik, the then Chief of Army Staff, called to congratulate him.

== See also ==
- Knight banneret
- Military rank
- Promotion (rank)
- Brevet (military)
- Rising from the ranks
