= Archdeacon of Blackburn =

Church of England ecclesiastical office

The Archdeacon of Blackburn is a senior ecclesiastical officer within the Diocese of Blackburn. Originally created on 17 August 1877 within the Diocese of Manchester, the office became a part of the new Diocese of Blackburn upon its creation on 12 November 1926.

As archdeacon she or he is responsible for the disciplinary supervision of the clergy within the seven area deaneries: Accrington, Blackburn with Darwen, Burnley, Chorley, Leyland, Pendle and Whalley.

== List of archdeacons ==
- 1877–1885 (res.): Edward Birch (c. 1814–1886; first Archdeacon)
- 1885–1899 (res.): Robert Rawstorne
- 1900–1901 (d.): Francis Cramer-Roberts, Vicar of Blackburn and assistant bishop
- 1901–1916 (d.): Robert Fletcher
- 1916–1920 (res.): Willoughby Allen
- 1920–1921 (d.): Edward Richardson
- 1922–1936 (d.): Atherton Rawstorne, Bishop suffragan of Whalley

The archdeaconry was transferred from the diocese of Manchester to the newly created diocese of Blackburn by Order-in-Council on 12 November 1926.

- 1936–1936 (res.): Henry Fosbrooke
- 1936–1946 (ret.): Richard Newman
- 1946–1959 (res.): Charles Lambert
- 1959–1962 (d.): Arnold Picton
- 1962–1973 (d.): Norman Hodd
- 1973–1986 (ret.): Desmond Carroll (afterwards archdeacon emeritus)
- 1986–1996 (ret.): David Robinson (afterwards archdeacon emeritus)
- 1996–September 2001 (res.): John Marsh
- 2002–31 July 2015 (ret.): John Hawley
- 31 July–aft. September 2015 (Acting): Roger Smith
- bef. November 2015 – February 2016 (Acting): Timothy Lipscomb
- 14 February 2016 – April 2025: Mark Ireland (retired)
- 23 November 2025 onwards: Jane Atkinson (announced)
