= Bishop of Whalley =

Anglican suffragan bishop in England

The Bishop of Whalley was an episcopal title used by a Church of England suffragan bishop; the See was created by Order in Council on 28 June 1909 (under the Suffragans Nomination Act 1888) and took its name after the large village Whalley in Lancashire.

The suffragan bishop was originally under the jurisdiction of the Diocese of Manchester, but with the creation of the Diocese of Blackburn in 1926, the suffragan bishop and the Whalley area became part of the new diocese. Since 1936, the title has been in abeyance.

== List of bishops ==
Bishops of Whalley
From	Until	Incumbent	Notes
1909	1936	Atherton Rawstorne	Diocese of Manchester until 1926/7; Diocese of Blackburn thereafter.
1936	present	in abeyance	
