= Robert Rawstorne =

Robert Atherton Rawstorne (4 March 1824 – 4 September 1902) was the Archdeacon of Blackburn from 1885 to 1899.

== Ecclesiastical career ==
Rawstorne was born in 1824, the son of Rev. Robert Atherton Rawstorne, who served as rector of Warrington for 24 years. The Rawstorne family hailed from Lancashire, where they owned Penwortham Priory and Hutton Hall. He was educated at Brasenose College, Oxford, where he graduated in 1846, was ordained deacon in 1848 and as a priest in 1849 by James Prince Lee, Bishop of Manchester. Following a nomination by a kinsman, he received a perpetual curacy at Penwortham in 1852, and was appointed Vicar of Balderstone in 1859, a position he held until 1897. He served as a proctor in convocation for the Archdeaconry of Blackburn from 1880 to 1885, as rural dean of Blackburn from 1880 to 1887, and as Archdeacon of Blackburn from 1885 to 1899.

He died at Balderstone Grange on 4 September 1902.

== Family ==
Rawstorne married Cecilia Feilden, daughter of Joseph Feilden of Witton Park, in 1854.

His second son, Henry Fielden Rawstorne (1859–1924) married Mabel Katharina Whalley-Smythe-Gardiner (died 1892), the only child and heir of Sir John Brocas Whalley-Smythe-Gardiner, 4th and last Baronet of Roche Court, in 1887. Their daughter, Mabel Dorothy Rawstorne (1889–1936), was the second wife of Vice-Admiral Sir William Fane De Salis (1858–1939).

Church of England titles
| Preceded by Edward Birch | Archdeacon of Blackburn; 1885–1899 | Succeeded by Francis Cramer-Roberts |
