= Atherton Rawstorne =

- Bishop of Whalley
- Diocese: Diocese of Manchester (until 1927); Diocese of Blackburn (from 1927)
- In office: 1909 – 1936 (death)
- Other posts: Rector of Croston (1894–1932); Archdeacon of Blackburn (1922–1936)

Personal details
- Born: 9 July 1855
- Died: 5 May 1936 (aged 80) Croston, Lancashire, United Kingdom
- Denomination: Anglican
- Parents: Robert Rawstorne
- Spouse: Anne Horton (m. 1888)
- Children: 3 sons, 3 daughters
- Education: Corpus Christi College, Oxford

Atherton Gwillym Rawstorne (9 July 1855 – 5 May 1936) was the Bishop of Whalley (a suffragan bishop in the Diocese of Manchester until 1927, in the Diocese of Blackburn from 1927) from 1909 to 1936; and Archdeacon of Blackburn from 1922 to 1936.

Rawstorne was born the eldest son of Robert Rawstorne, sometime Archdeacon of Blackburn, and was educated at Eton and Corpus Christi College, Oxford. Ordained in 1879, he was appointed Curate of All Saints', Bradford, West Riding of Yorkshire (1879–1882), where the vicar was George Kennion; then when Kennion emigrated to become Bishop of Adelaide, in South Australia, Rawstorne went with him as his Chaplain (1882–1886). He then served as Commissary to the Bishop of Adelaide (Kennion until 1894, then John Harmer) alongside his other appointments (1887–1904): he became Curate of Scarborough in the North Riding (1887–1888) and perpetual curate of Oulton in the West Riding (1889–1994). In 1888, he married Anne (only daughter of G. W. Horton, a vicar); they had three sons and three daughters.

Rawstorne then served Croston, Lancashire as Rector (1894–1932), during which time he was also Rural Dean of Leyland from 1908 until 1922. He was first appointed to the episcopate in 1909, becoming Bishop of Whalley, suffragan to the Bishop of Manchester (Edmund Knox until 1921; William Temple thereafter). He became Archdeacon of Blackburn (1922–1935) and, when the Diocese of Blackburn was erected from the Diocese of Manchester, he kept his See (Whalley) and became suffragan to Percy Herbert, Bishop of Blackburn in 1927. When he died at Croston in 1936, he was still Bishop of Whalley.

Church of England titles
New title	Bishop of Whalley; 1909–1936	abeyance
